= Kamo Aquarium =

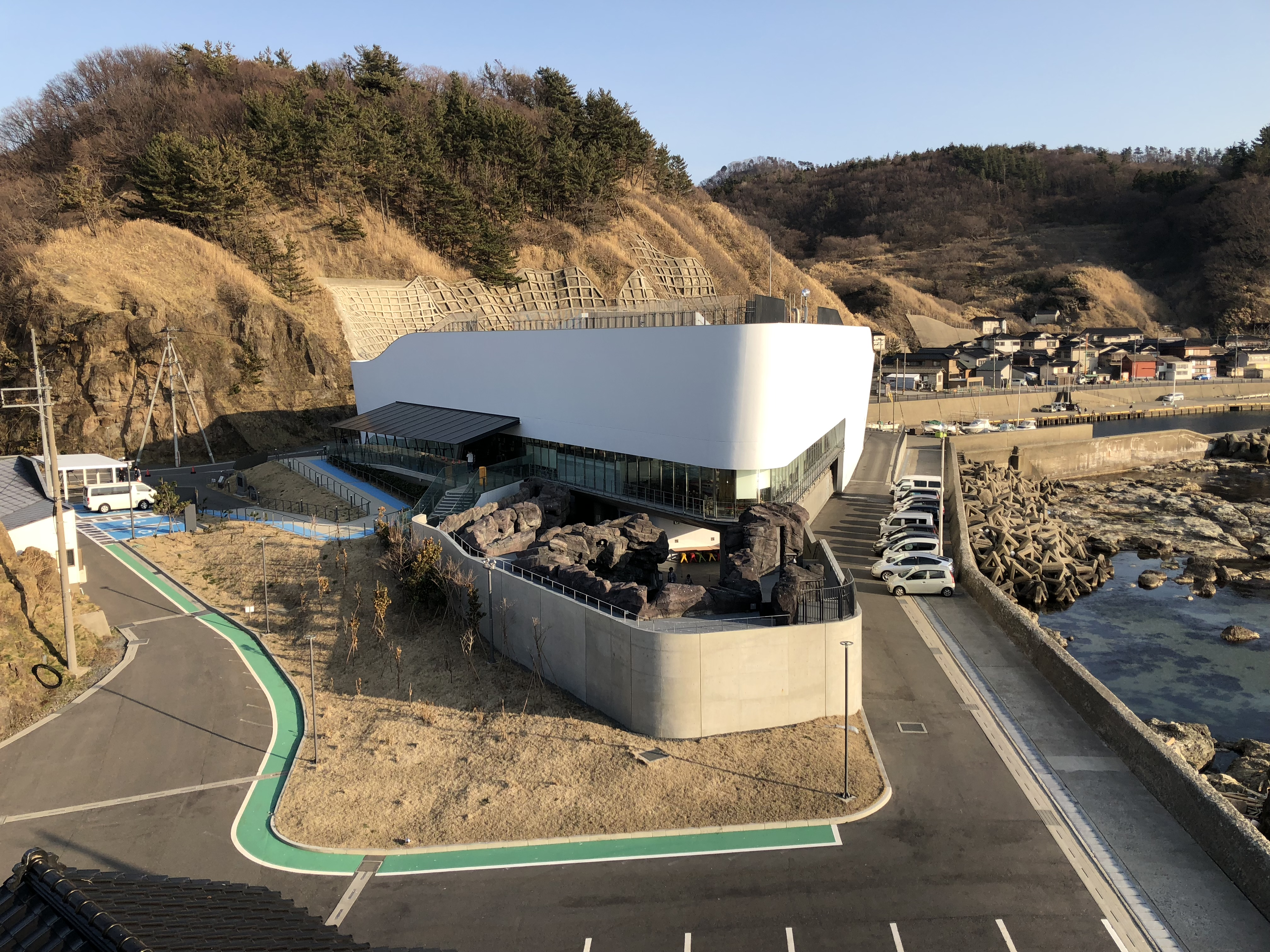
- The aquarium in 2018
- Interactive map of Kamo Aquarium
- 38°45′42″N 139°43′29″E
- Date opened: 1930 (first); 1956 (second); 1972 (third); 1 June 2014 (current)
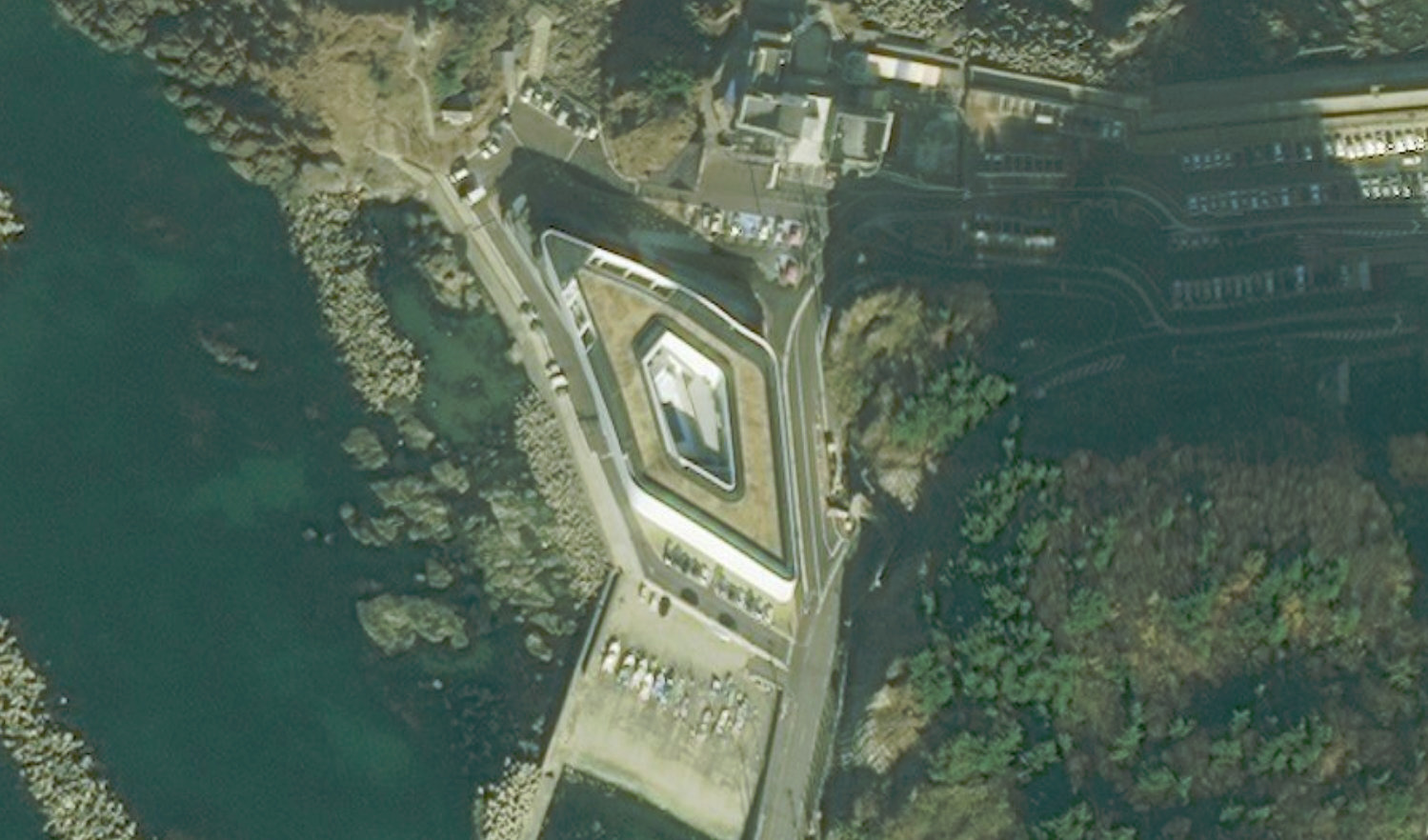
- Location: Okuba 657-1, Imaizumi, Tsuruoka, Yamagata, Japan
- No. of species: 140
- Annual visitors: 92,183 (1997); 716,354 (2014); 497,738 (2018)
- Memberships: JAZA
- Major exhibits: the Worlds' largest 60 jellyfish species
- Website: kamo-kurage.jp

Tsuruoka Municipal Kamo Aquarium (鶴岡市立加茂水族館, Kamo Suizokukan) is a public aquarium located in Tsuruoka, Yamagata Prefecture, Japan. In 2005, it exceeded Monterey Bay Aquarium in California regarding the number of jellyfish display types and holds the Guinness World Record for this exhibition.

== History ==
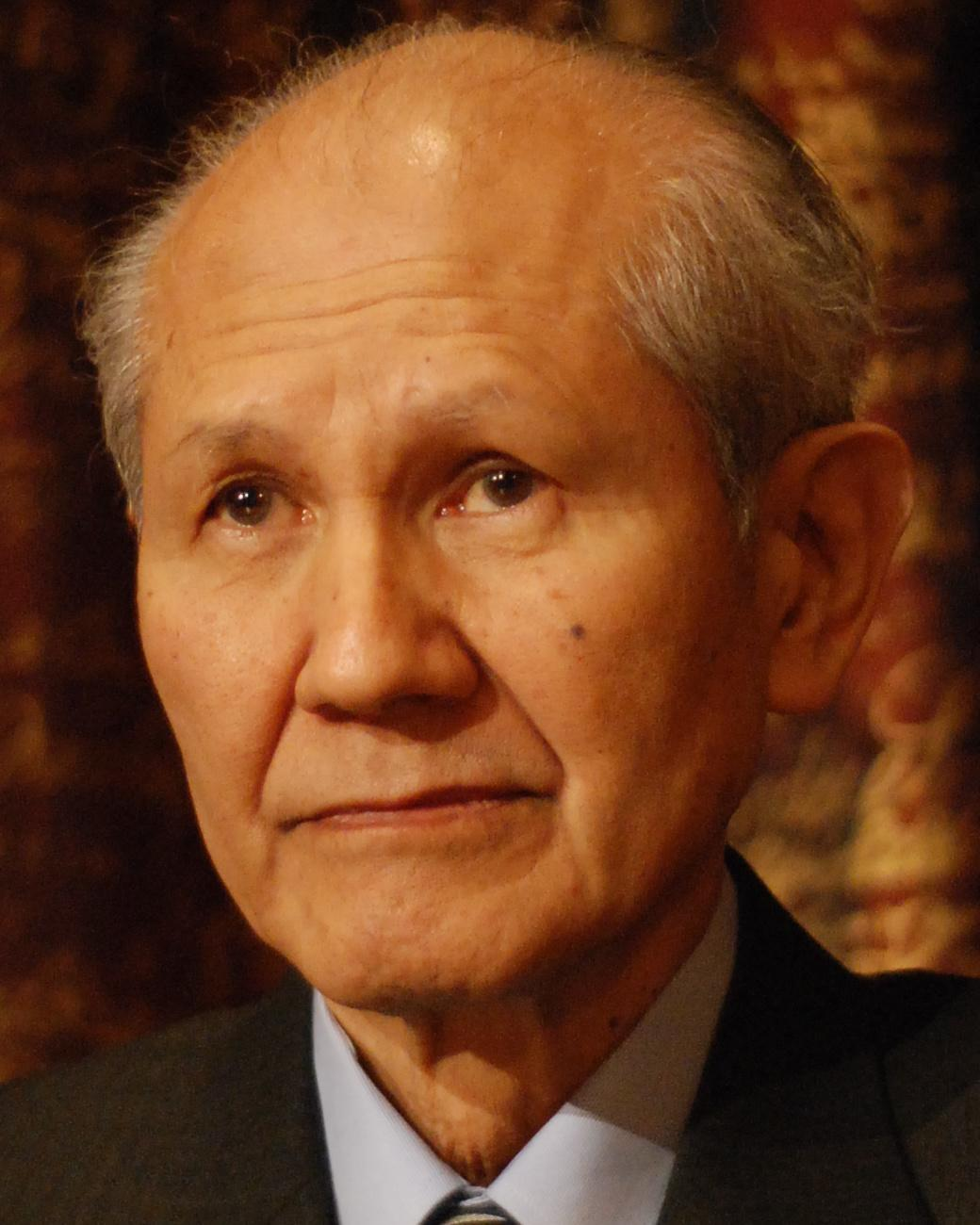
Osamu Shimomura

The aquarium was on the edge of bankruptcy for a second time in the late 1990s. Until then, jellyfish exhibits at aquariums were rare, and there were no breeding methods. In addition, Kamo Aquarium were experiencing financial troubles at the time. In such a situation, the aquarium's director, Tatsuo Murakami, fought to establish methods for breeding jellyfish in captivity. The popularity of the aquarium exploded when Osamu Shimomura received the Nobel Prize in Chemistry in 2008, thanks to the studies he led on the crystal jelly, a jellyfish that contains a green fluorescent protein, with two American scientists, Martin Chalfie at Columbia University and Roger Tsien at the University of California-San Diego. He led his studies in Kamo, since, at the time, it was the one of few aquariums displaying them. Researchers from around the world, including the Paris Aquarium Cineaqua in France, came to learn about these captive breeding methods.

With the light emission of the crystal jelly exhibited at the Kamo Aquarium, Osamu Shimomura won the 2008 Nobel Prize in Chemistry. It was also reported that the green fluorescent protein that was the reason for the award was derived from the crystal jelly. This attracted attention to the aquarium, which breeds crystal jellies, and the number of visitors to the museum increased to 1.5 to 2 times the normal number. The adult jellyfish bred at the aquarium emit light when they are collected from the wild, but they do not emit light when the generations are changed by artificial propagation. Upon hearing this, Shimomura called the aquarium directly on October 24, 2008, and advised, "if you mix coelenterazine with food, it will shine in two weeks." With the introduction of Shimomura, he took over coelenterazine from Katsunori Teranishi, a professor at the Graduate School of Bioresources, Mie University, and worked on a luminescence experiment.

== Northern elephant seal ==
A three-year-old 2.5-meter 273-kilogram female northern elephant seal was found on Sanze beach, Tsuruoka, on 16 October 2017. She was weakened and injured, but recovered after receiving antibiotics at the aquarium, growing to over 400 kilograms in March 2018. She was named Naomi, after tennis player Naomi Osaka, by a public vote and has been exhibited in a pool at Kamo.

== Exhibits ==
=== Jellyfish ===
- Lion's mane jellyfish
- Immortal jellyfish
- Cyanea capillata eschscholtz
- Freshwater jellyfish
- Habu-kurage
- Glassy nautilus
- Lychnorhiza lucerna
- Acromitus maculosus
- Jelly blubber
- Egg-yolk jellyfish
- Purple-striped jelly
- Rhizostoma luteum
- Blue jellyfish
- Spotted jelly
- Mastigias papua etpisoni
- Atlantic sea nettle
- Pacific sea nettle
- Flame jellyfish
- Beroe cucumis
- Cassiopea
- Bolinopsis mikado
- Spirocodon saltator
- Clinging jellyfish
- Thimble jellyfish
- Pelagia (cnidarian)
- South American sea nettle
- Pelagia noctiluca

=== Other marine creatures ===
- Rhinobatos schlegelii
- Asian sheepshead wrasse
- Smooth lumpfish

== Gallery ==
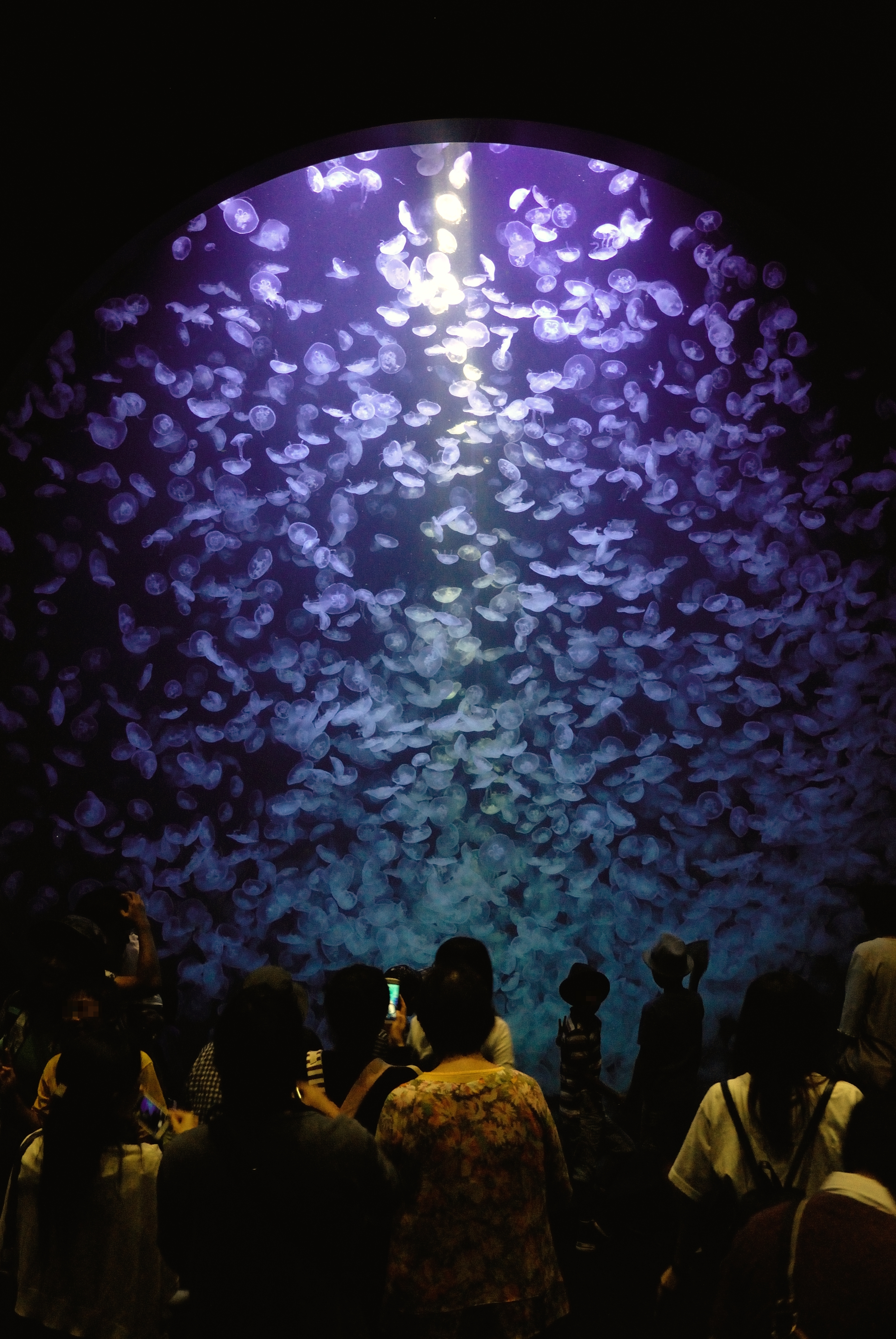
Jellyfish Dream Theater, a five-meter-diameter kreisel tank, also certified by the Guinness Book of World Records as the single largest jellyfish display in the world.

=== Jellyfish ===
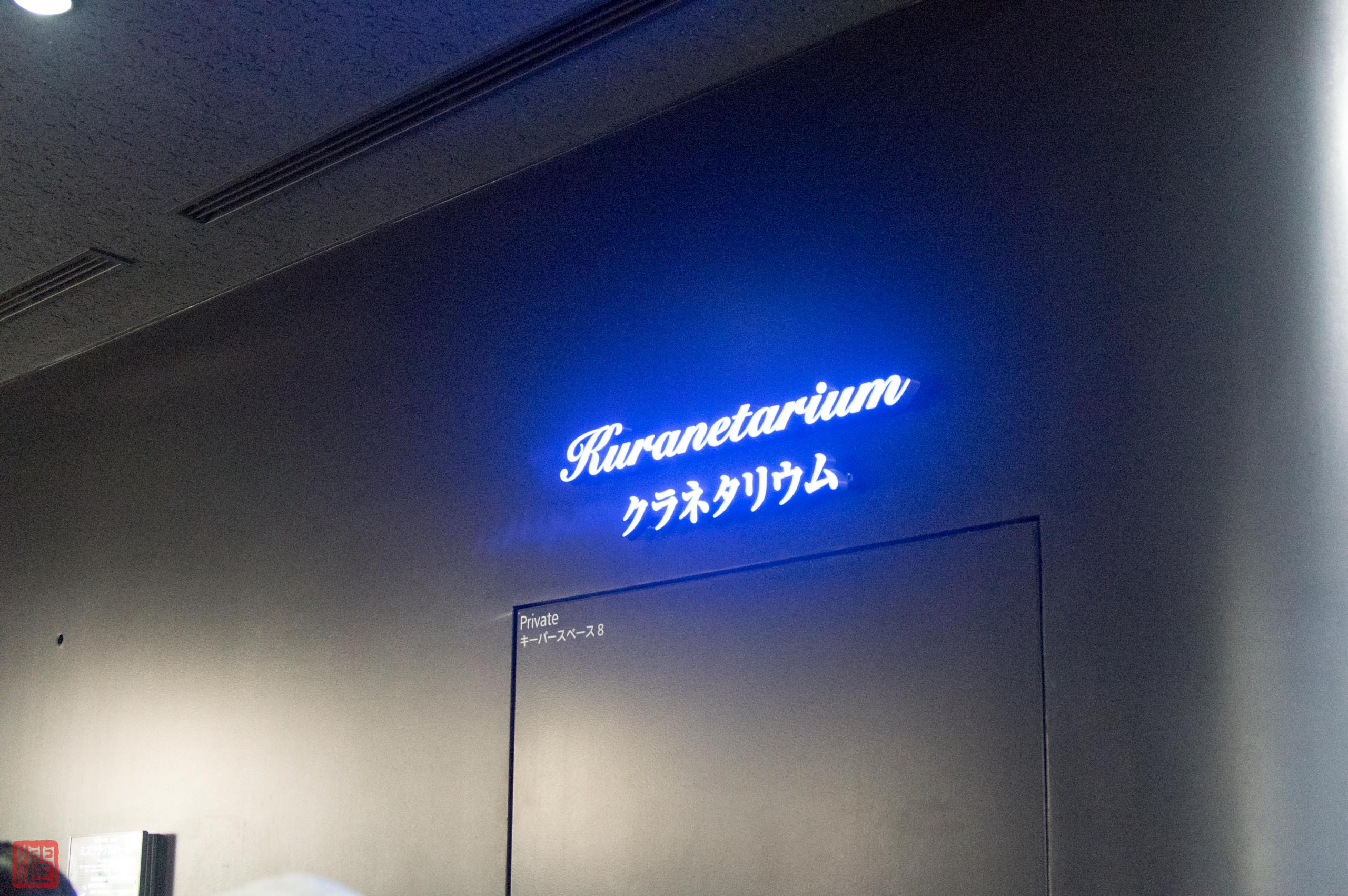
Kuranetarium Sign (a blendword combining kurage and planetarium)

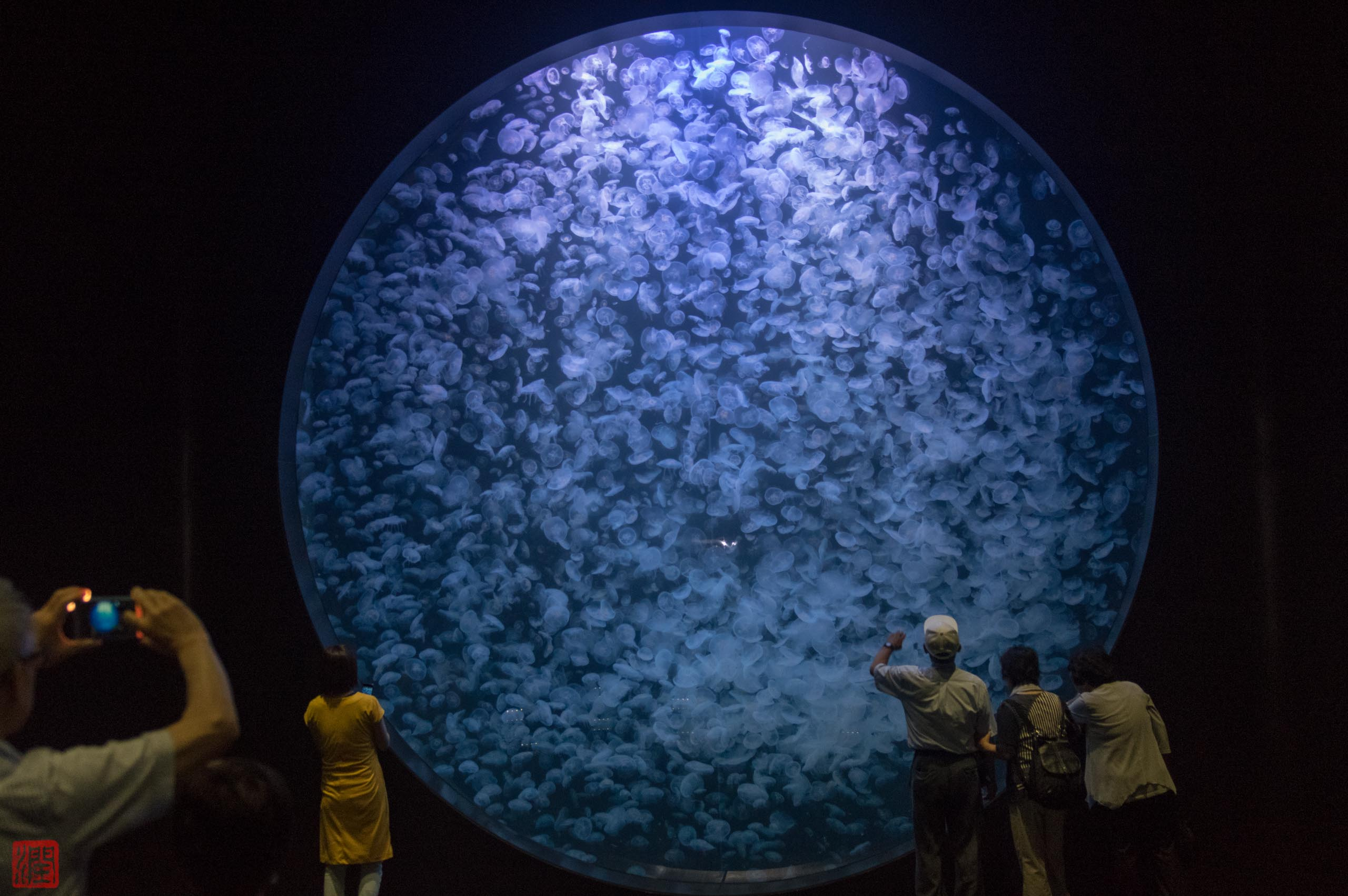
Medusarium

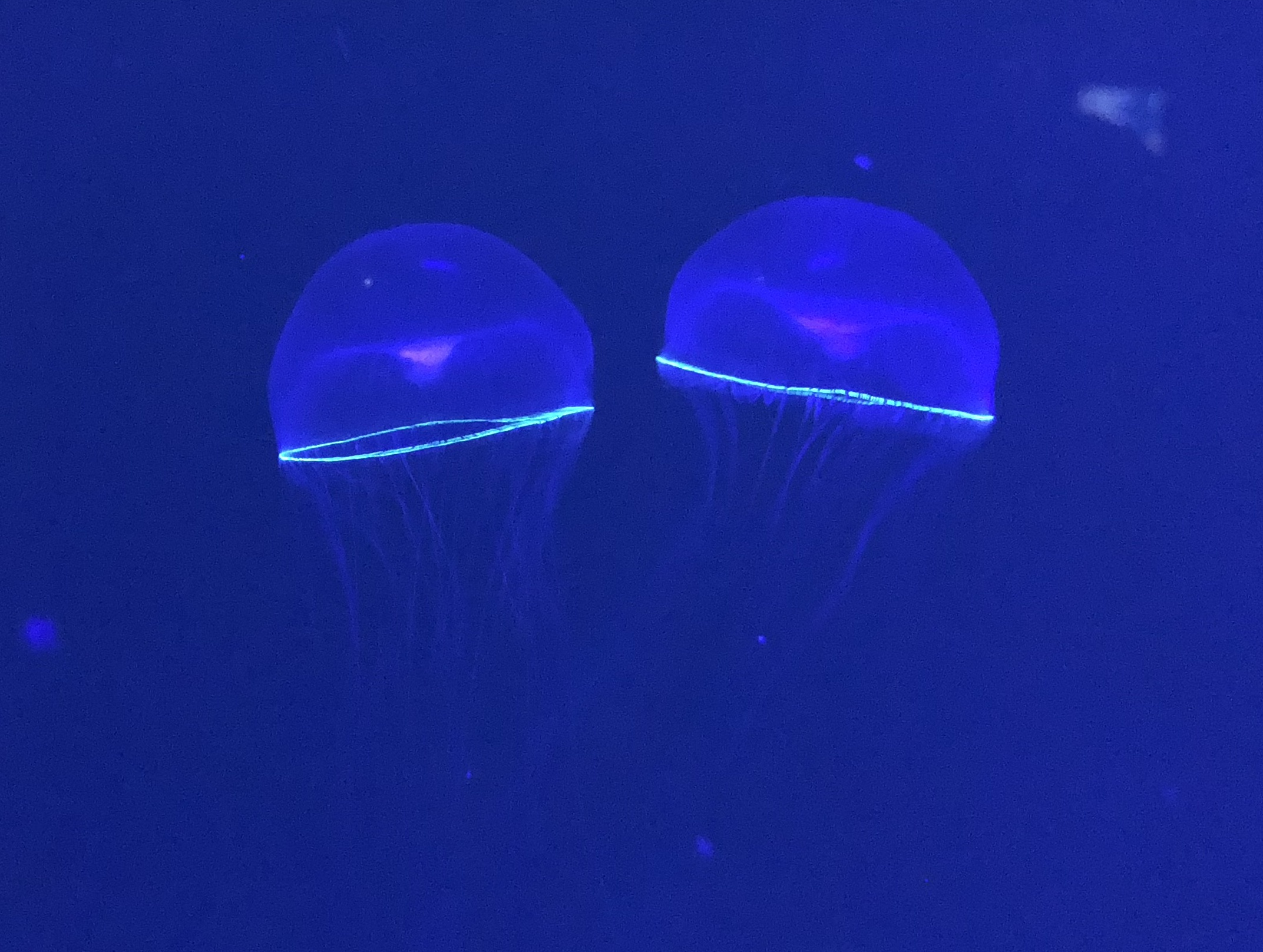
Shimmering crystal jelly

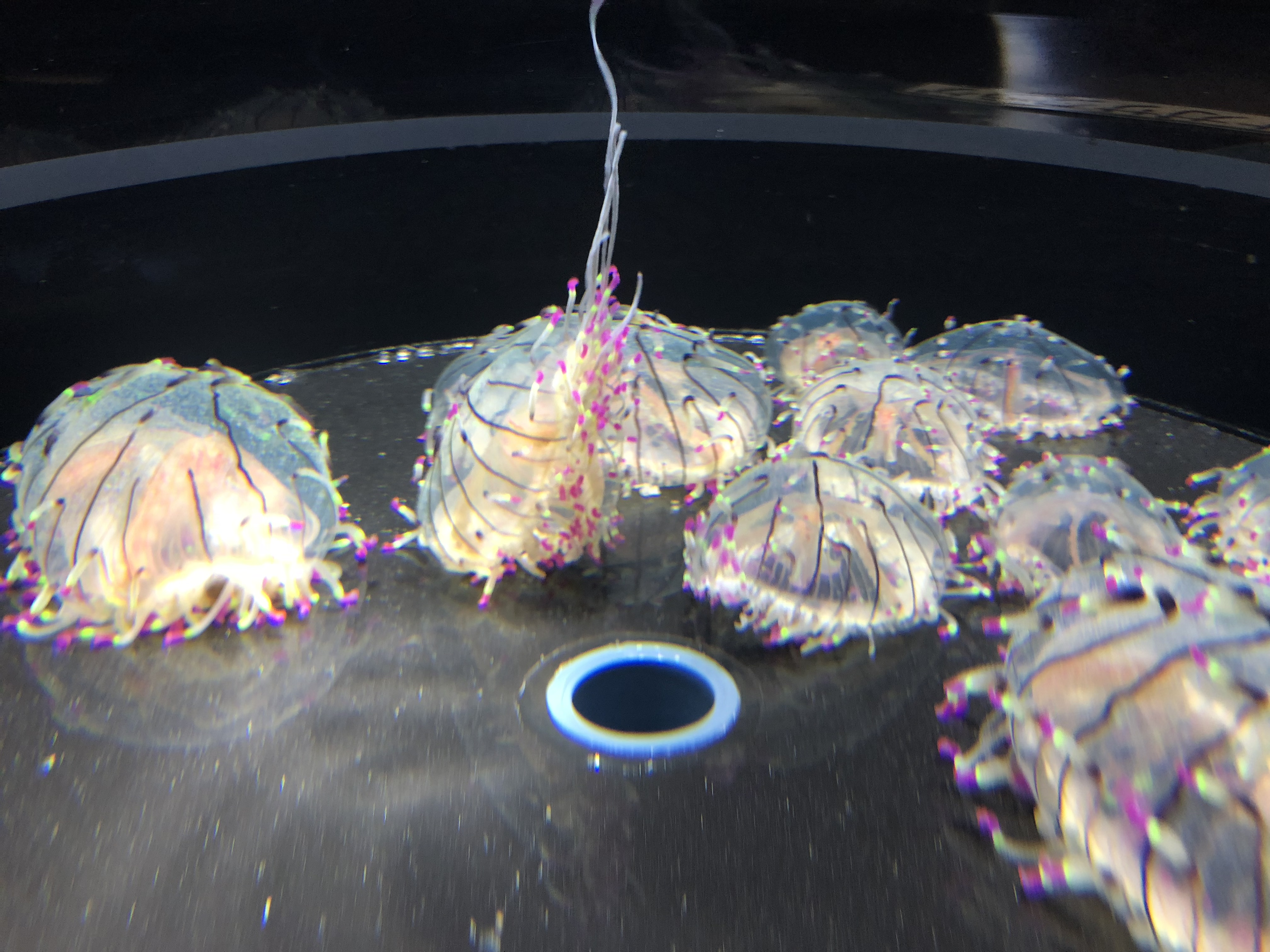
Flower hat jelly with fluorescent yellow and pink tentacles

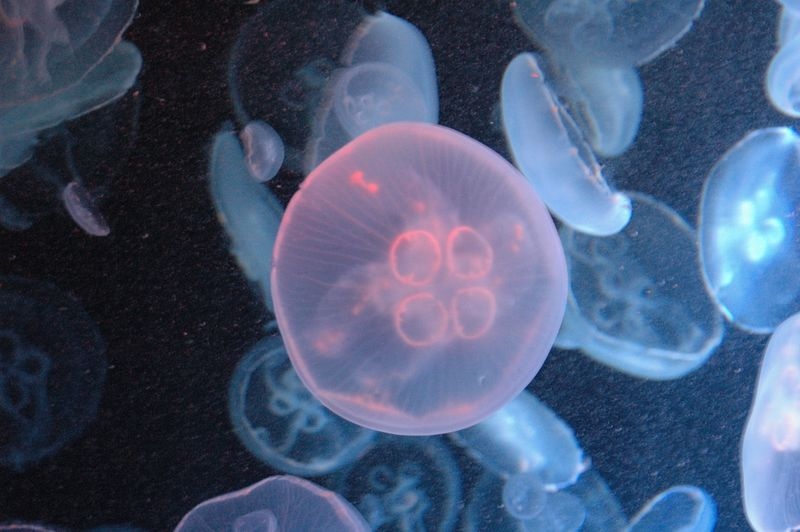
Moon jellyfish

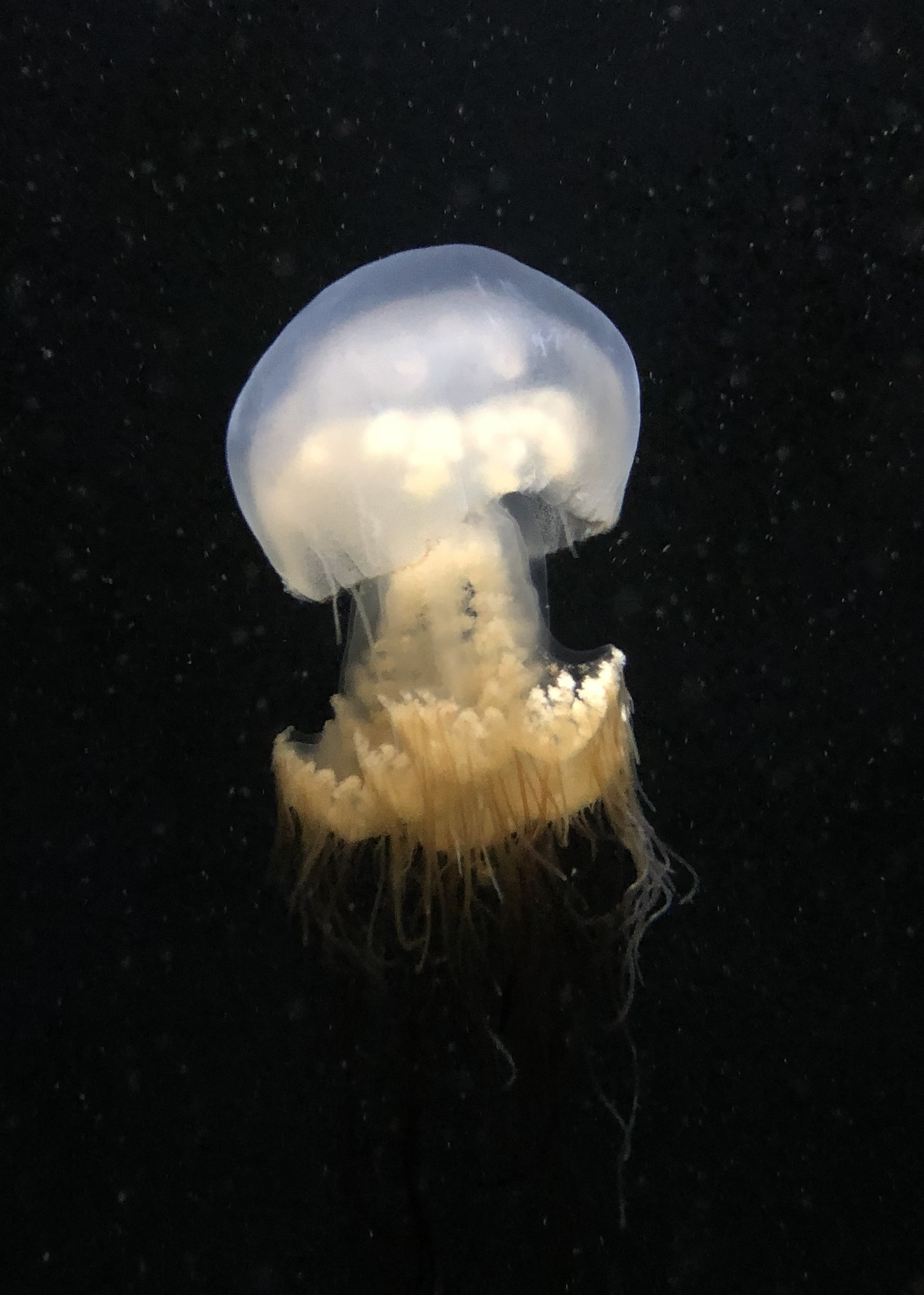
Nomura's jellyfish

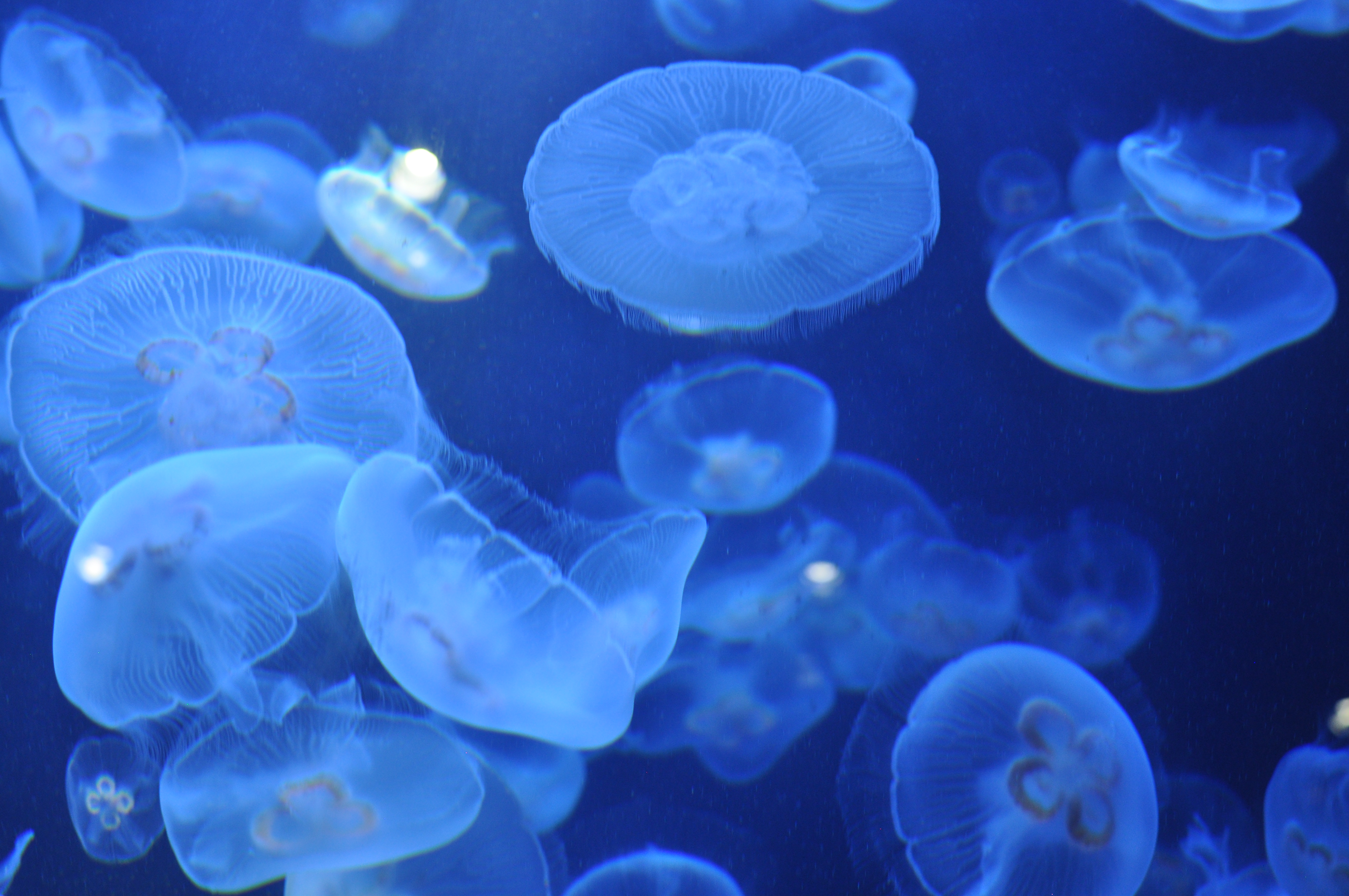

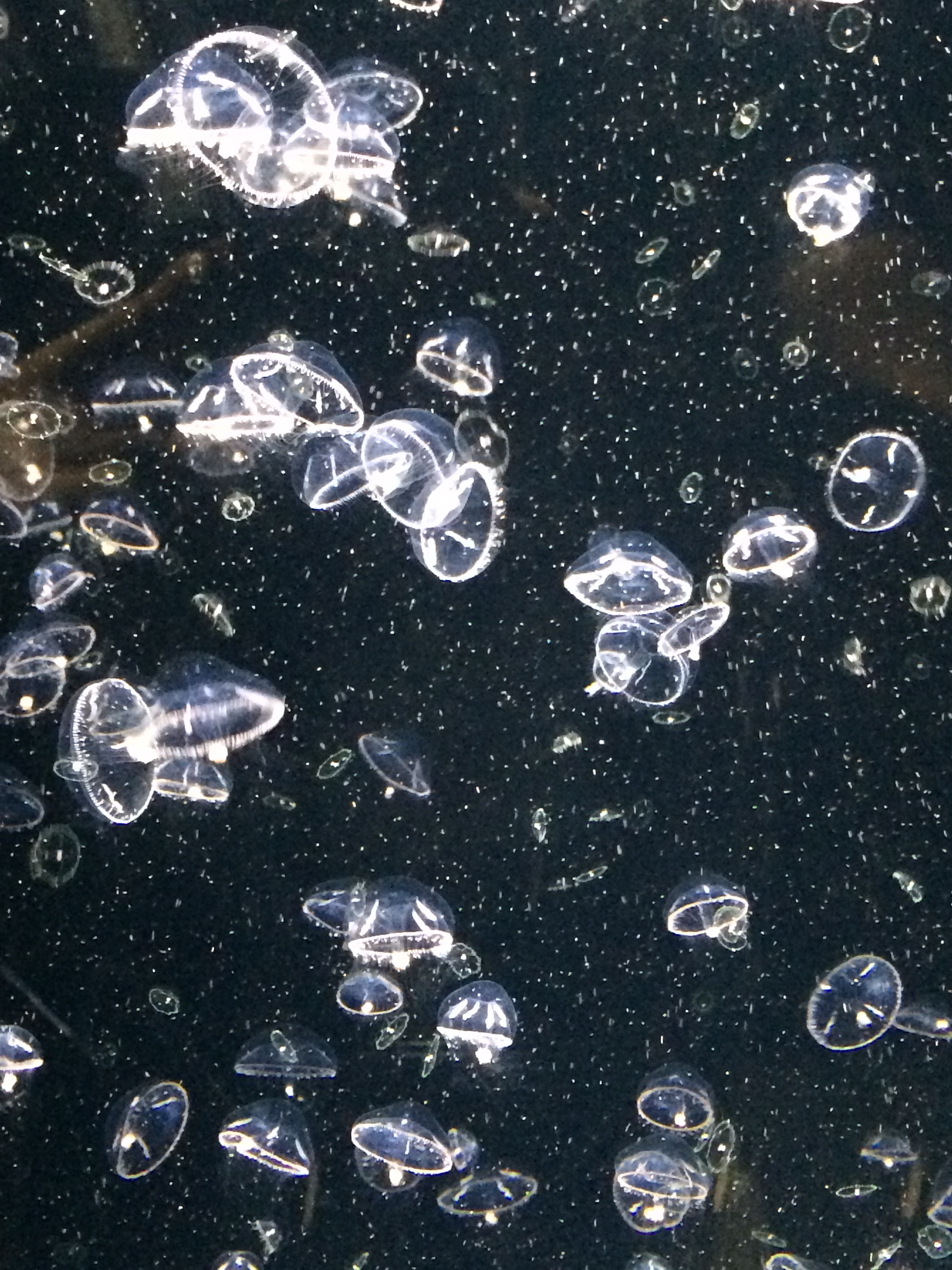

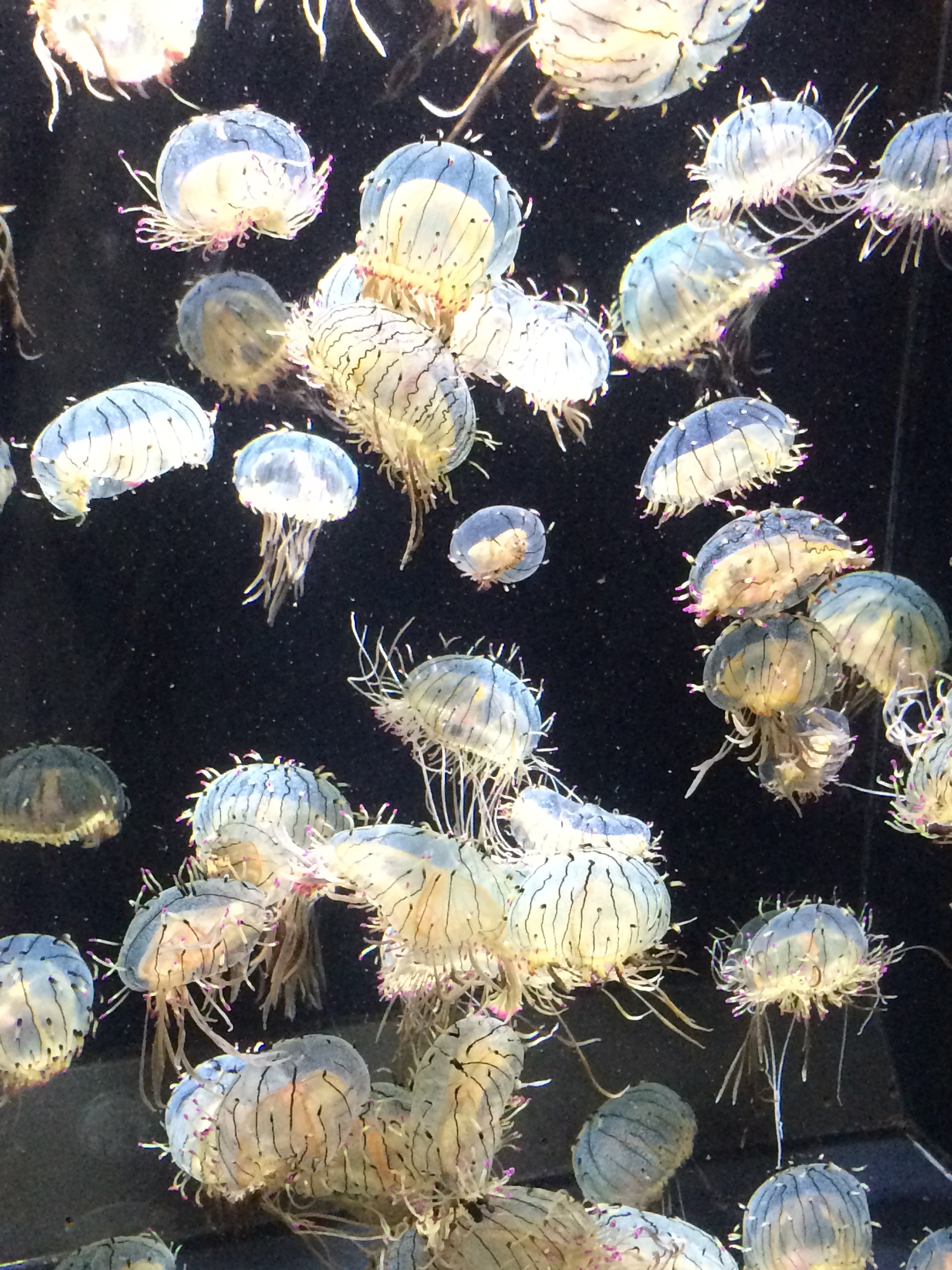

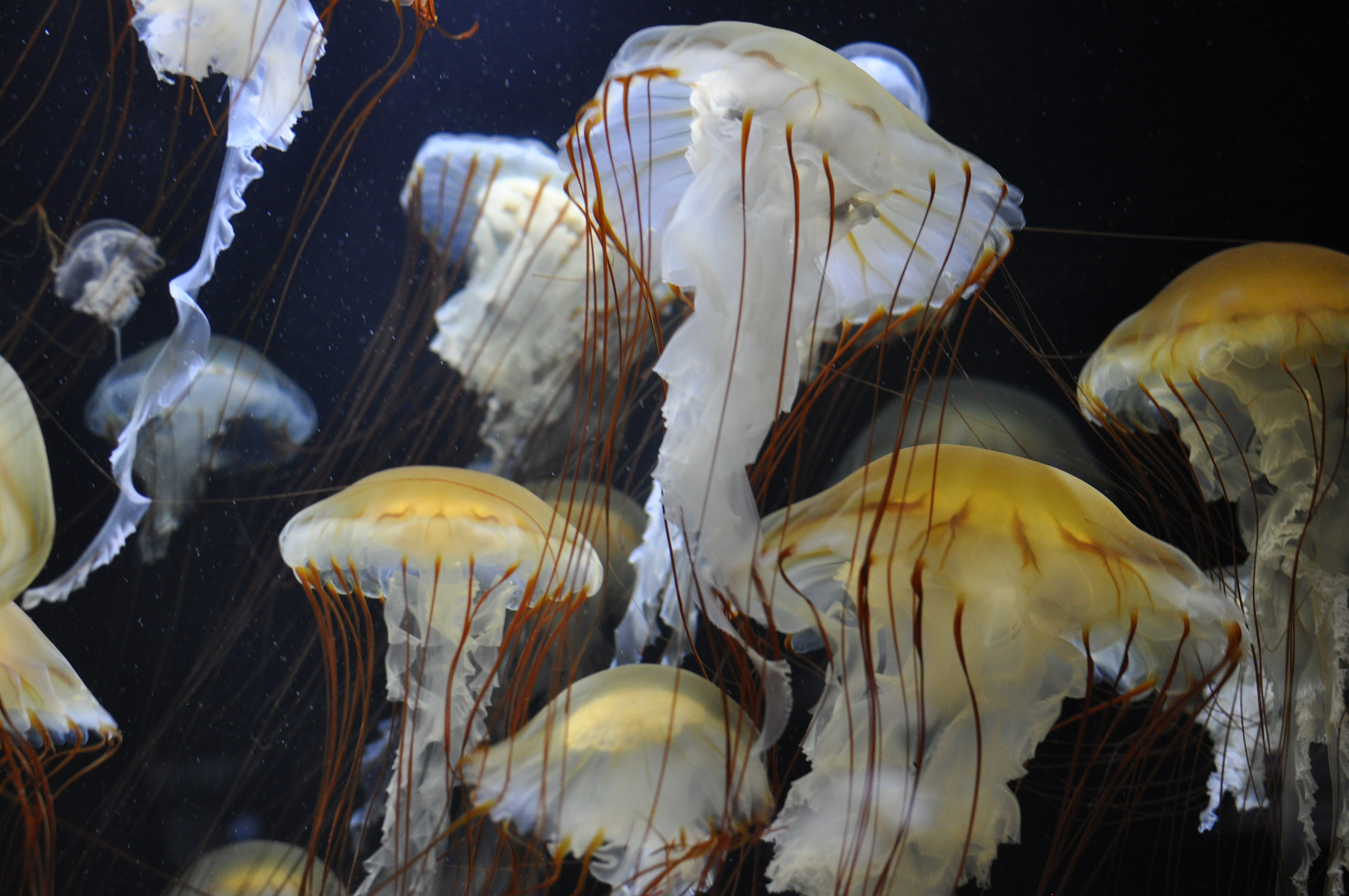

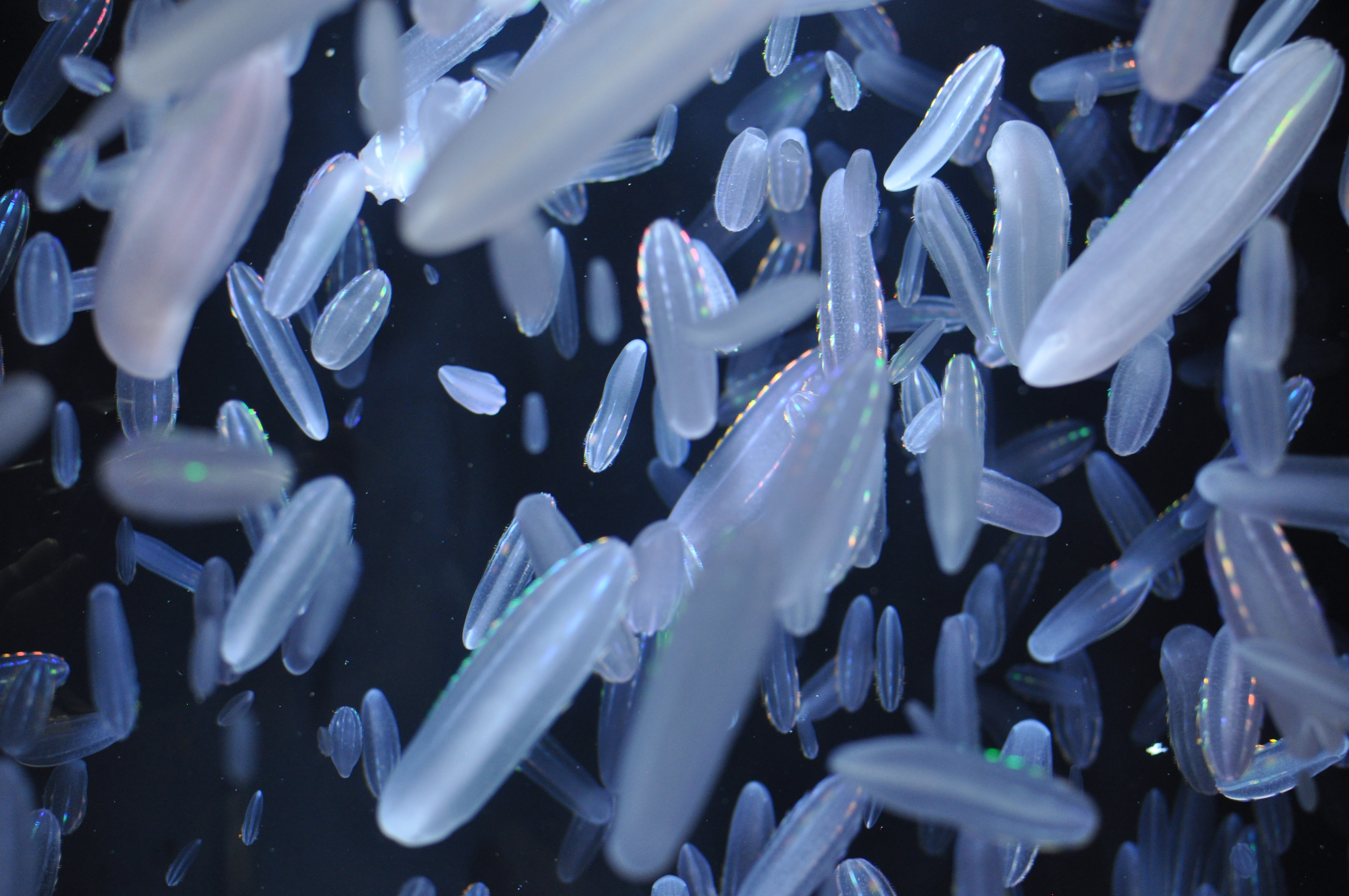
Glowing jellyfish

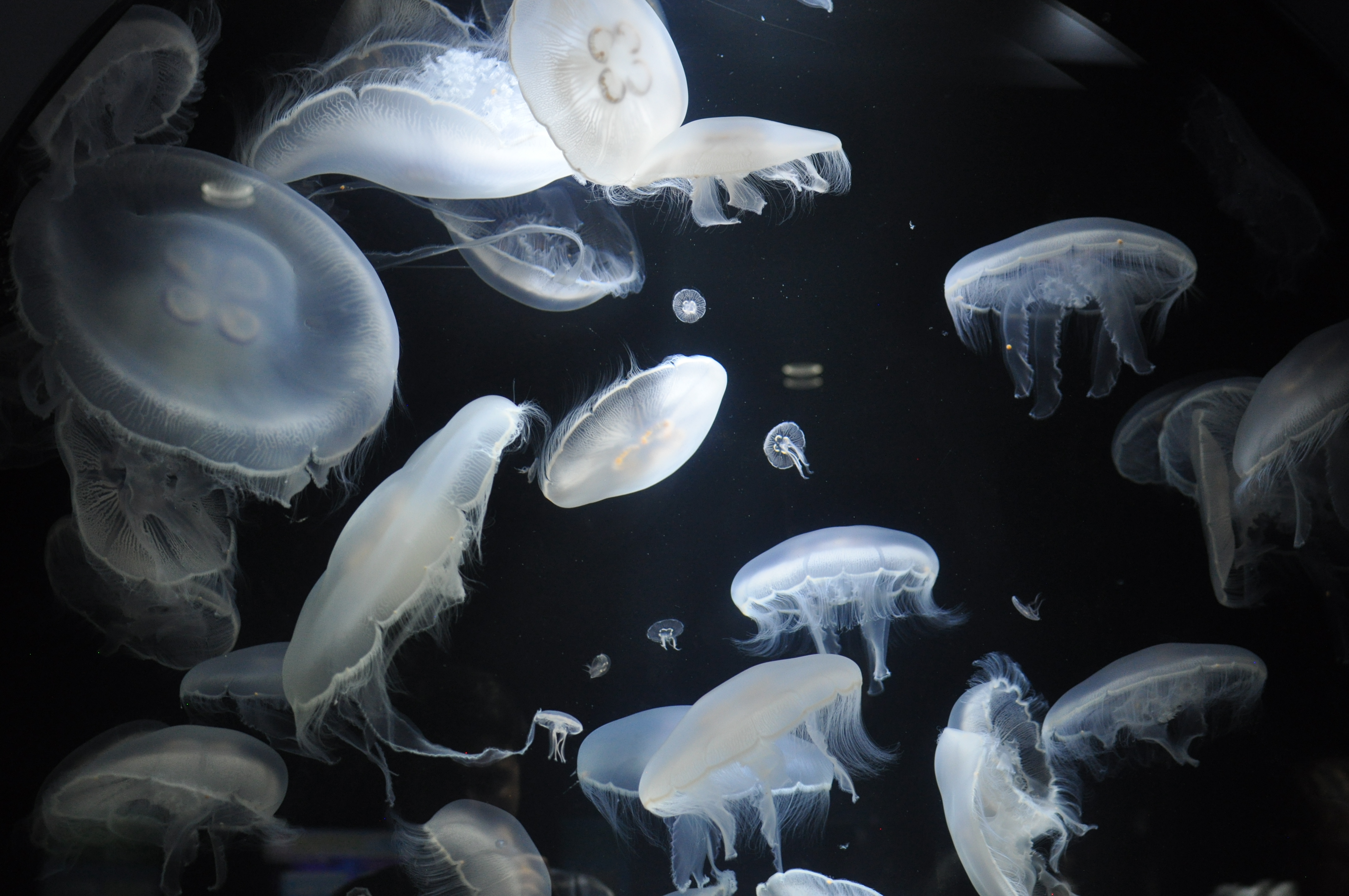

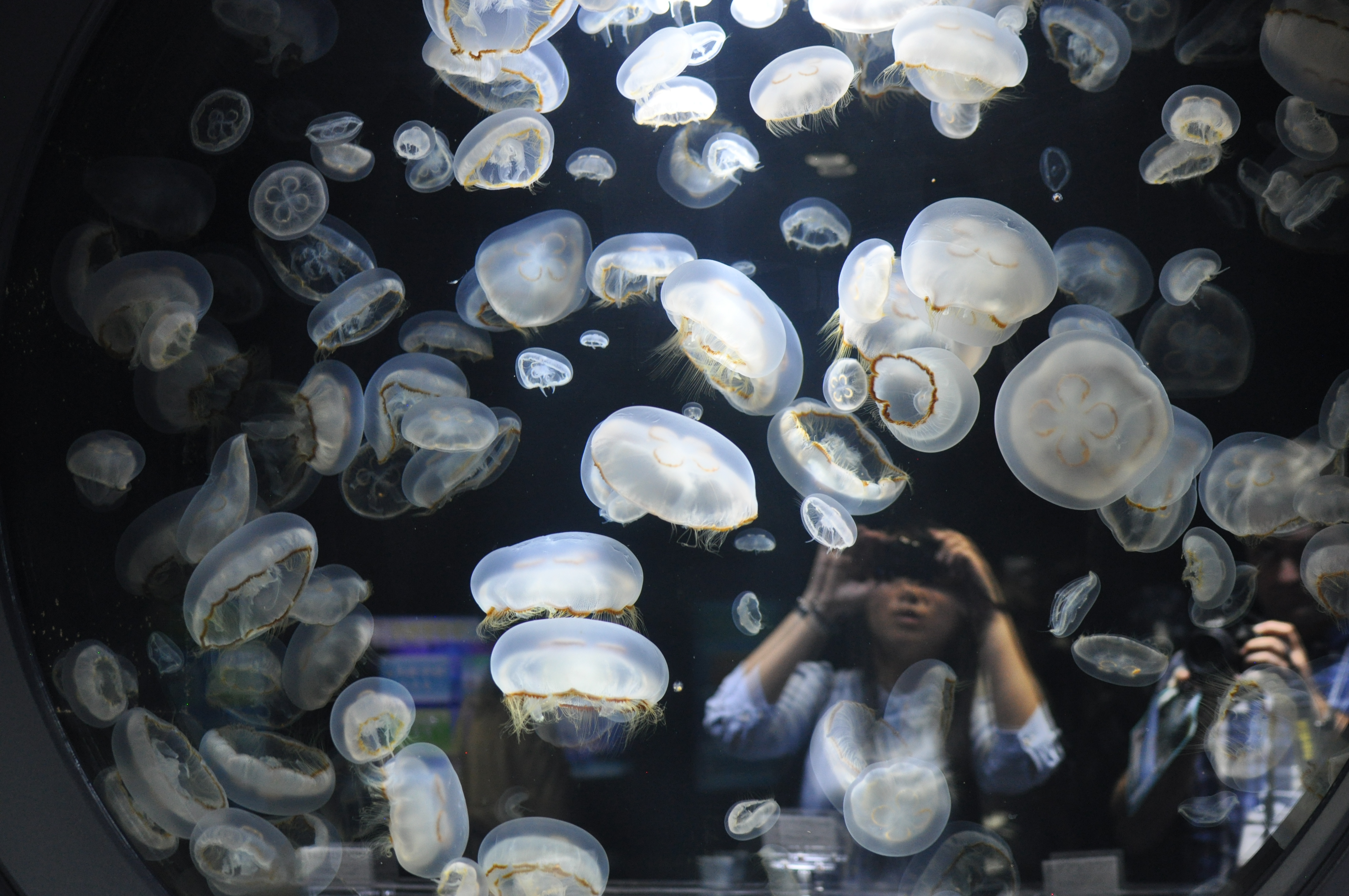

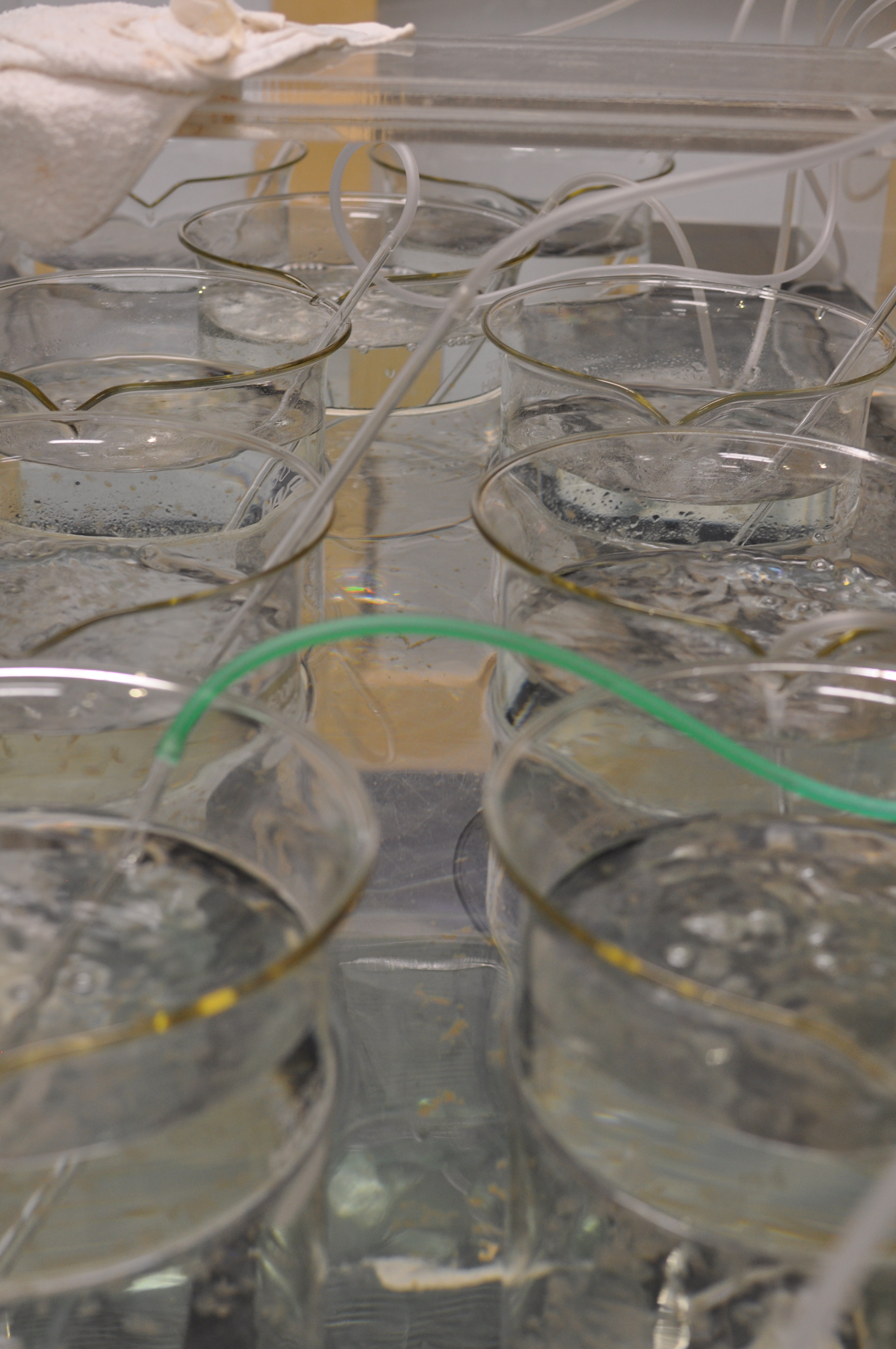
Breeding Jellyfish in captivity

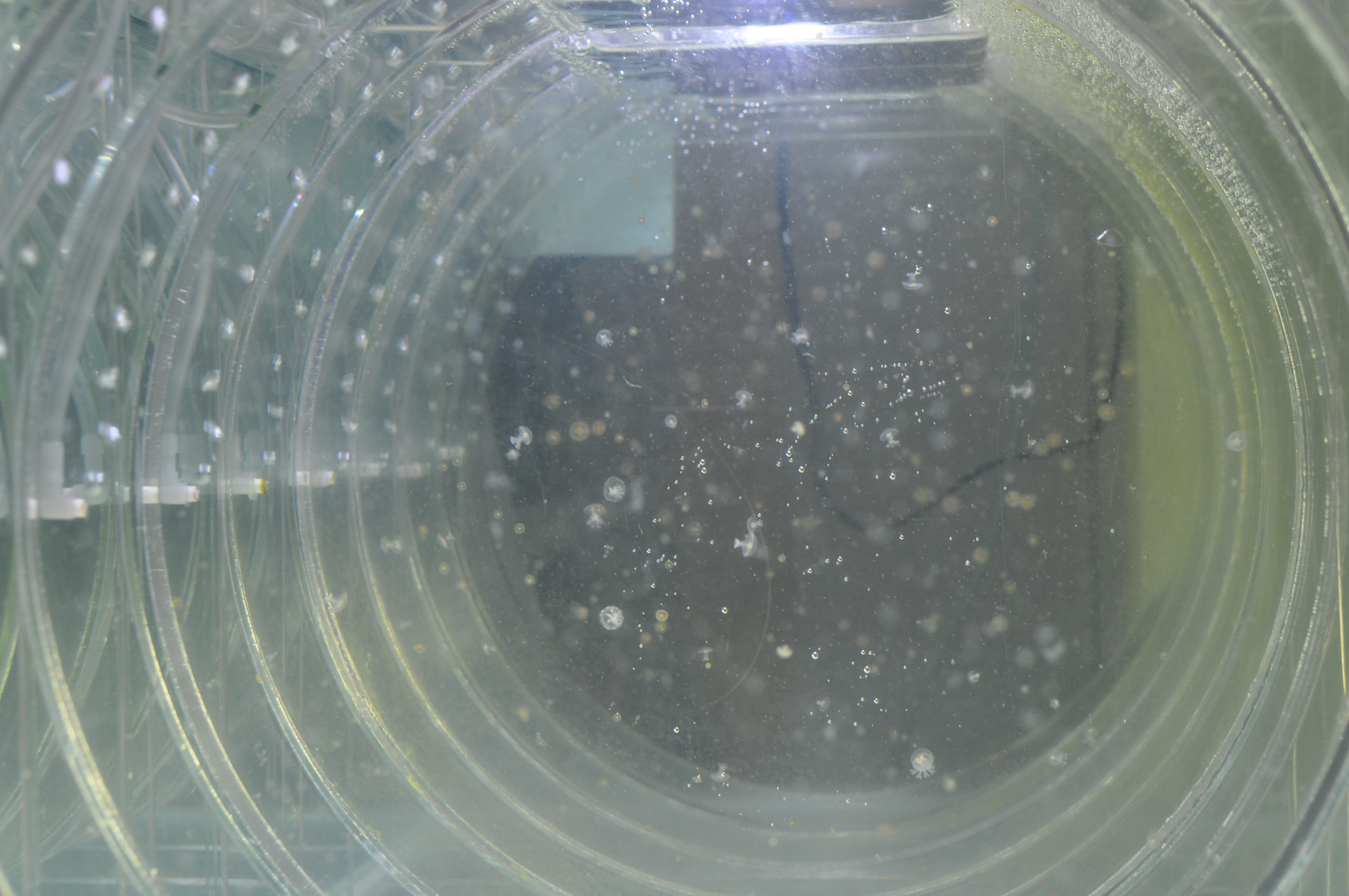
Growing baby jellyfish

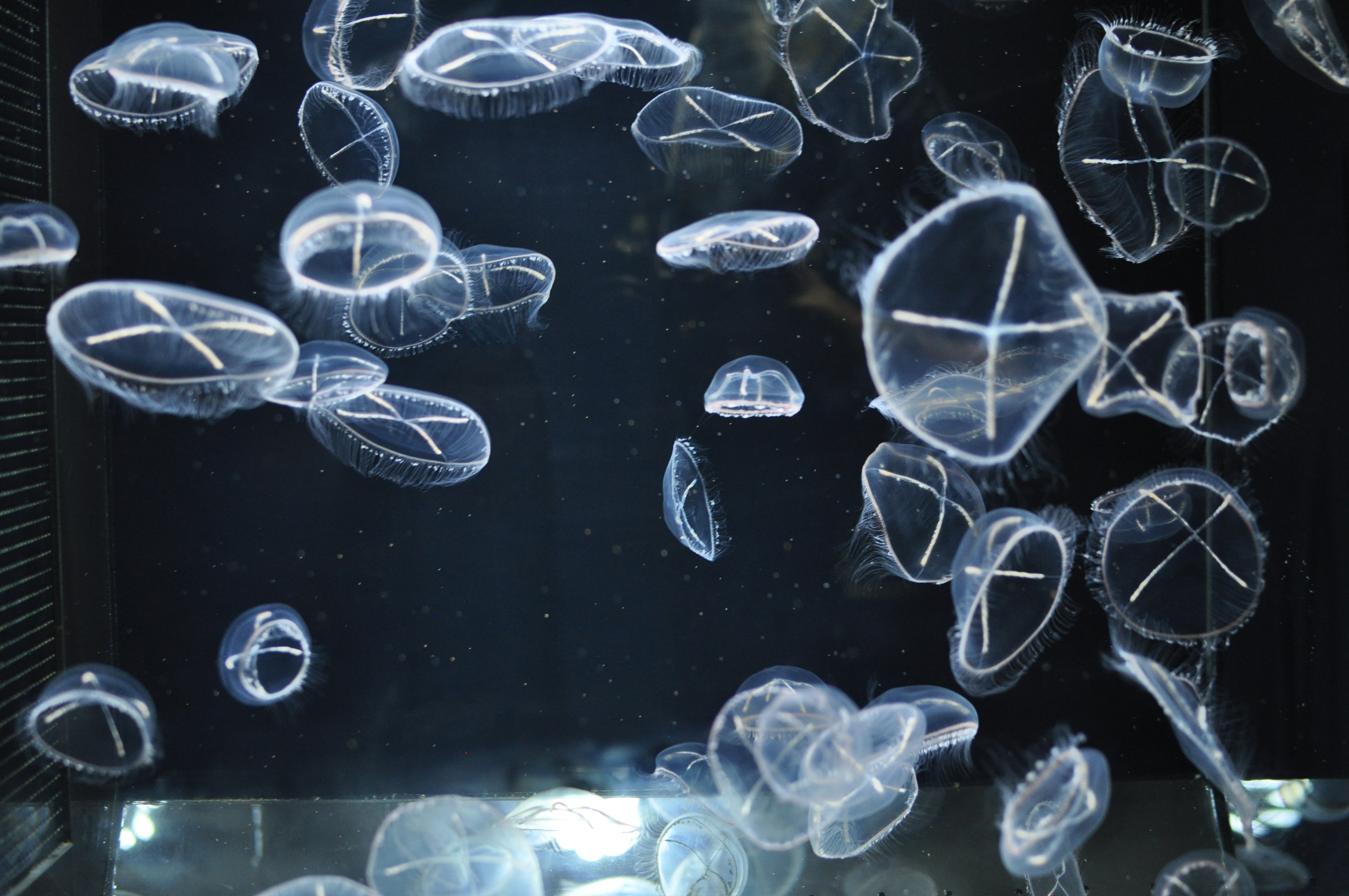

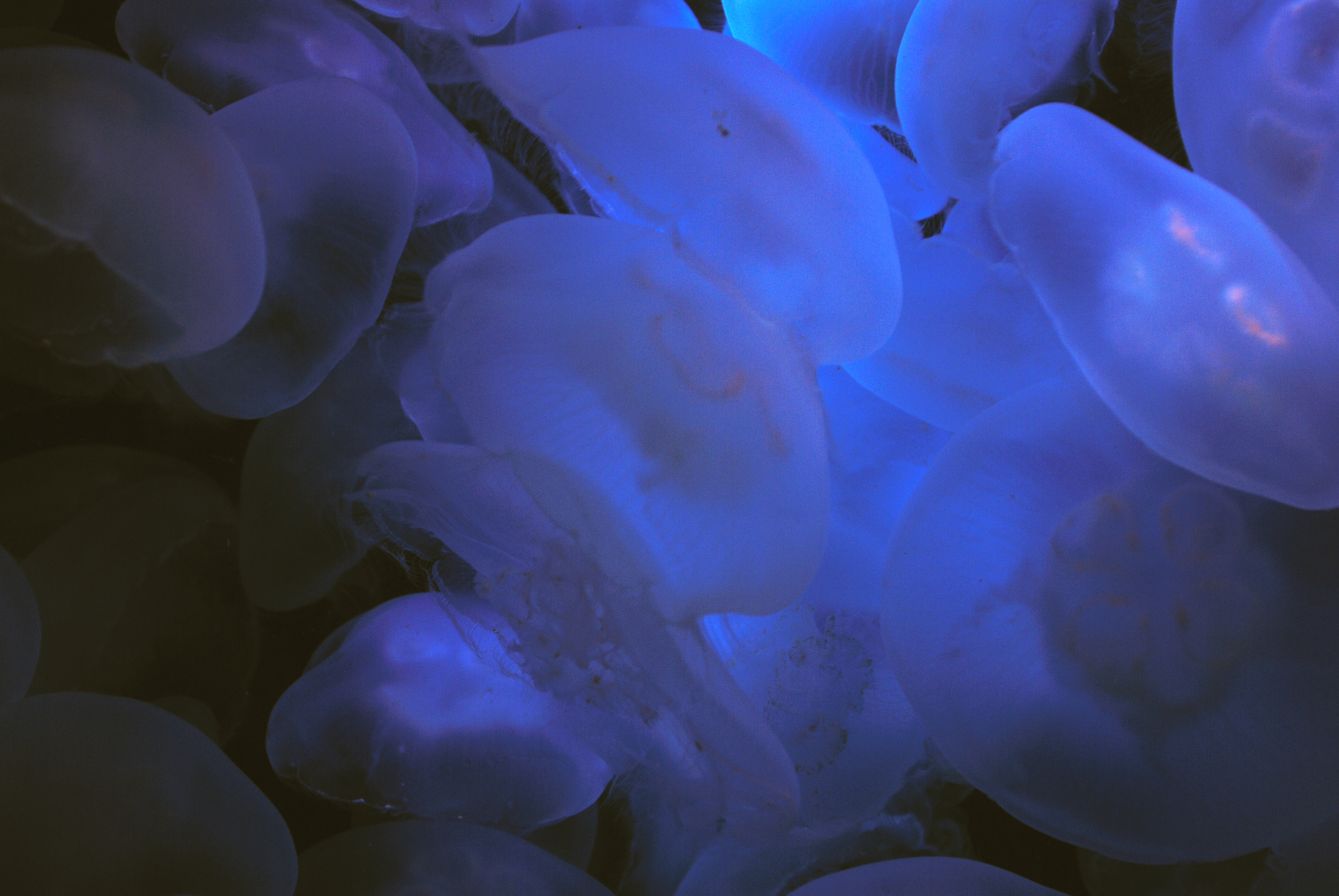

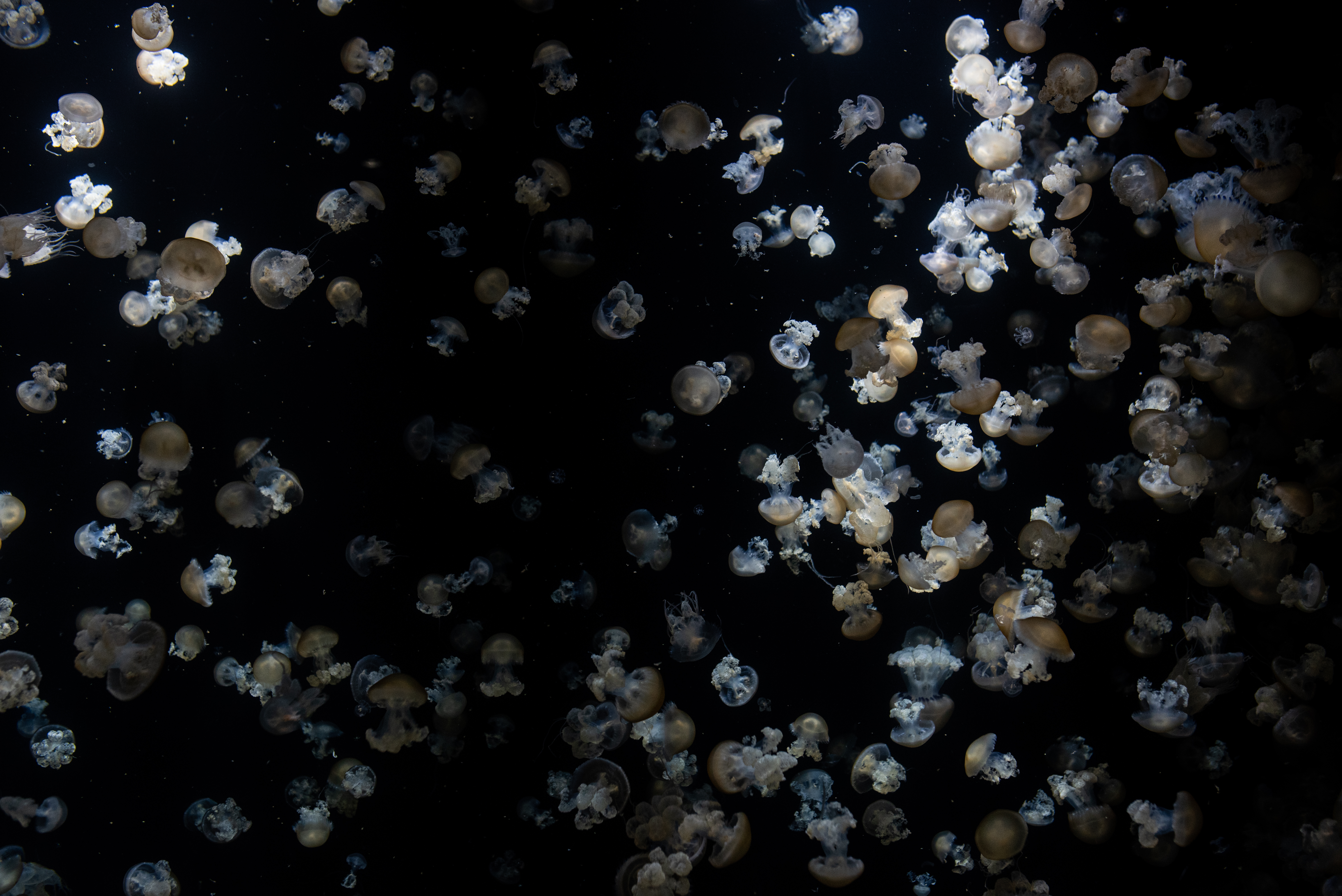

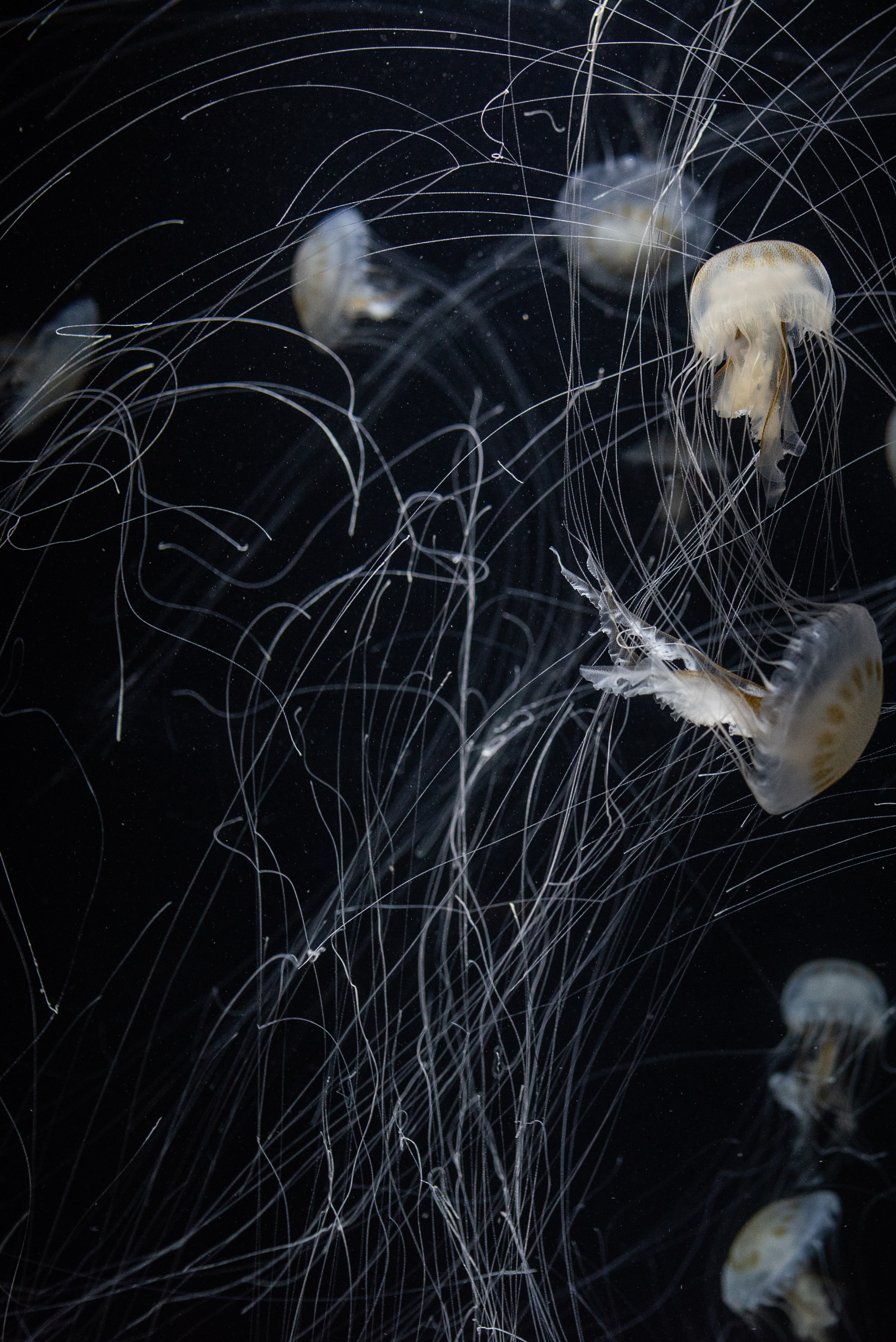

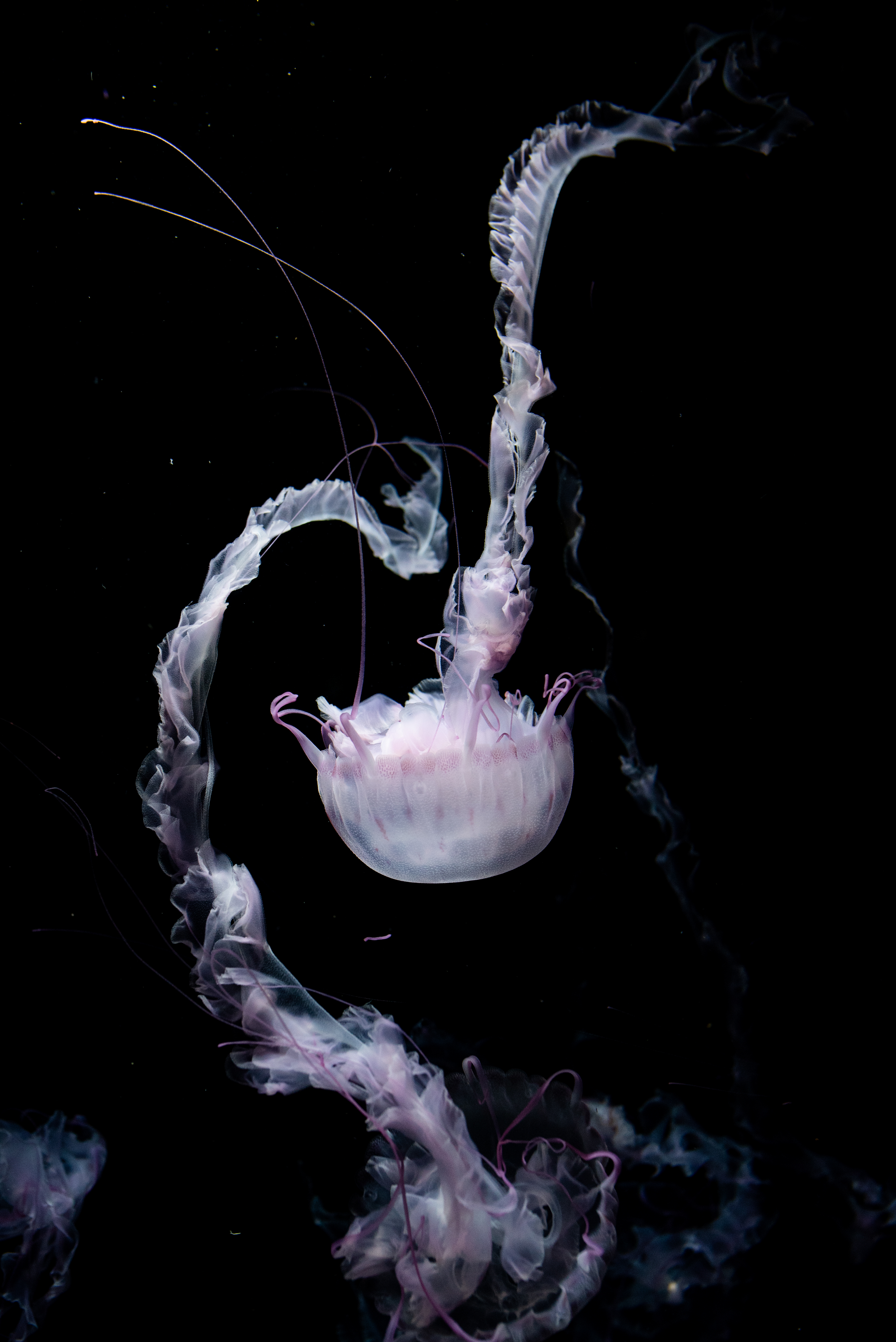

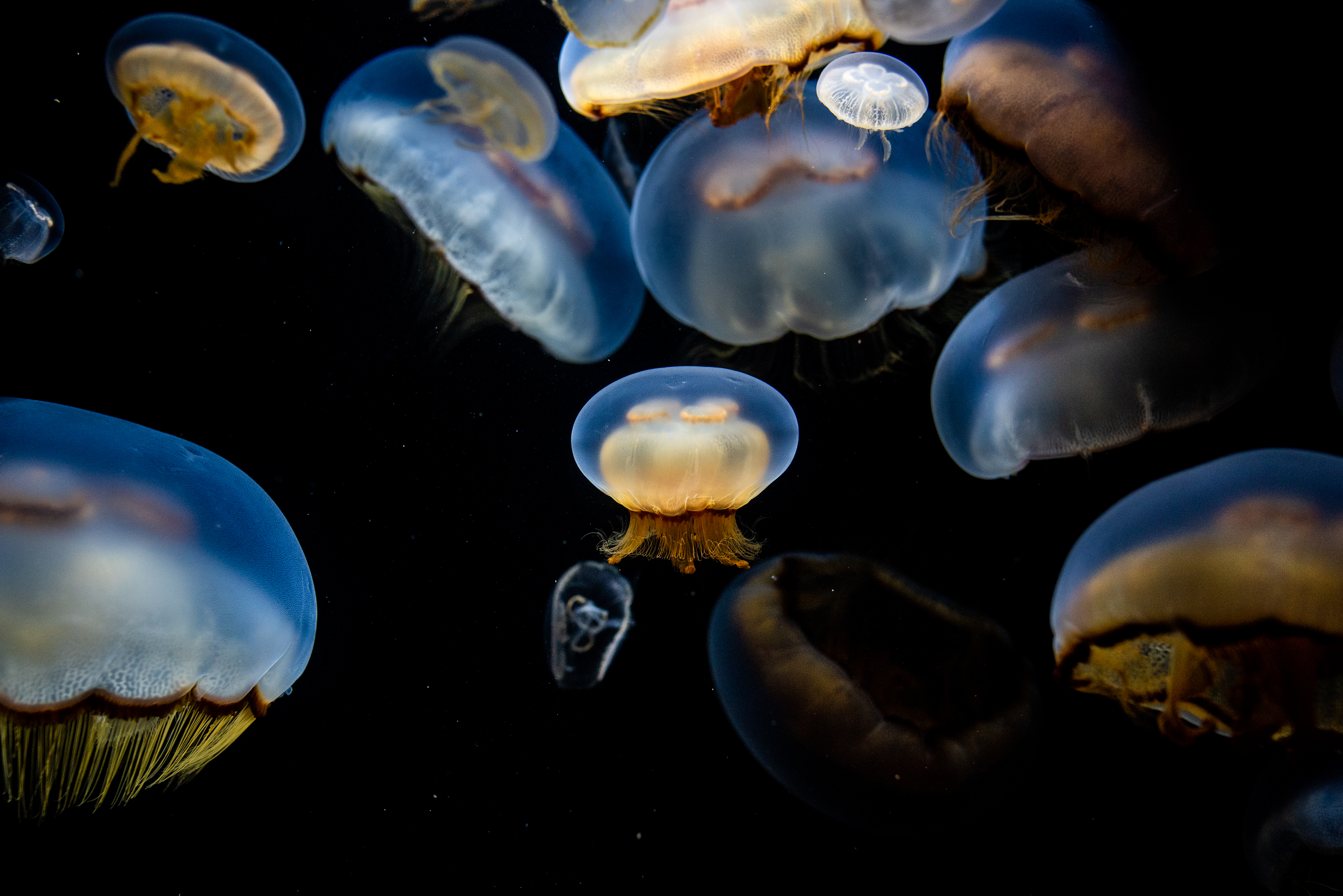

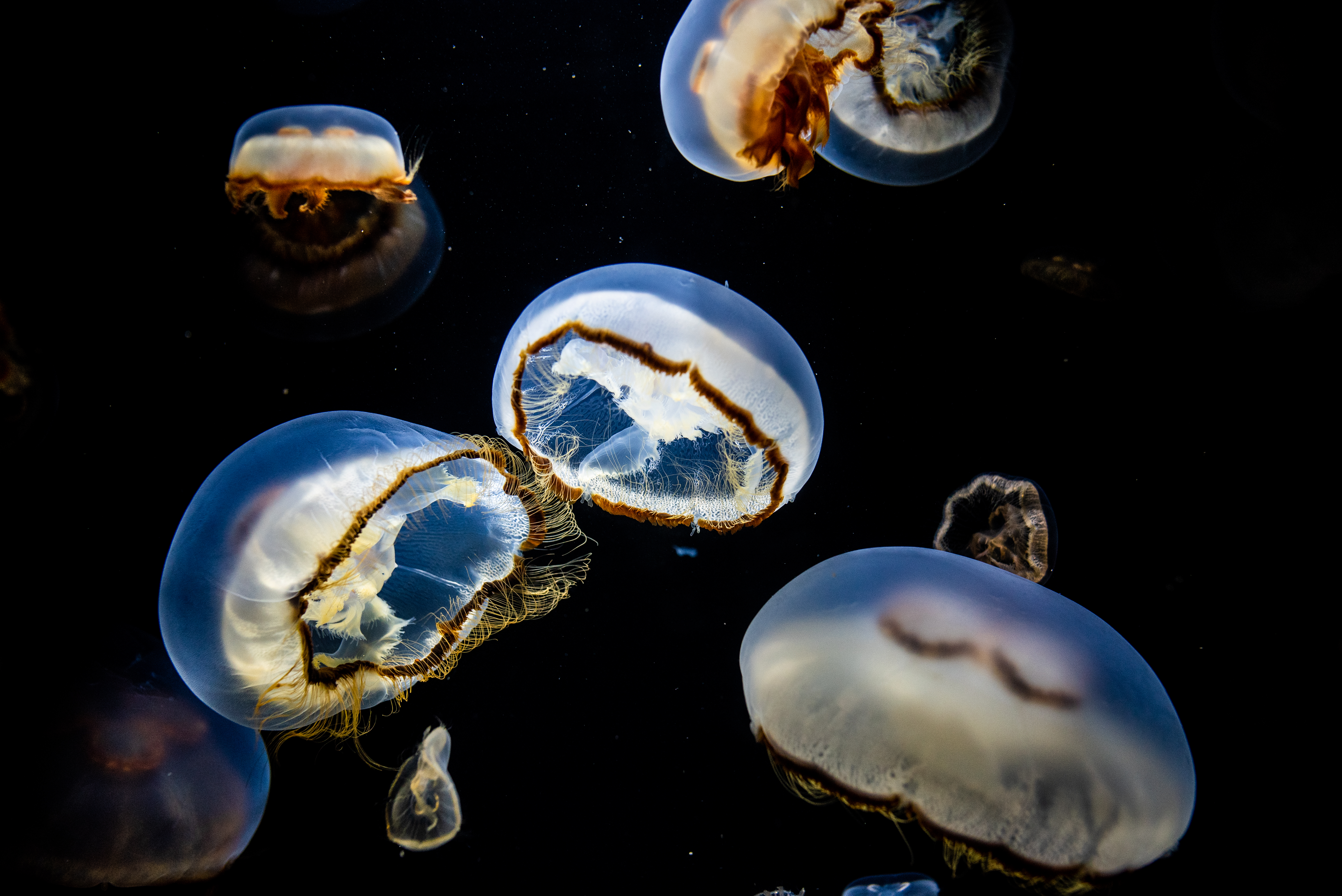

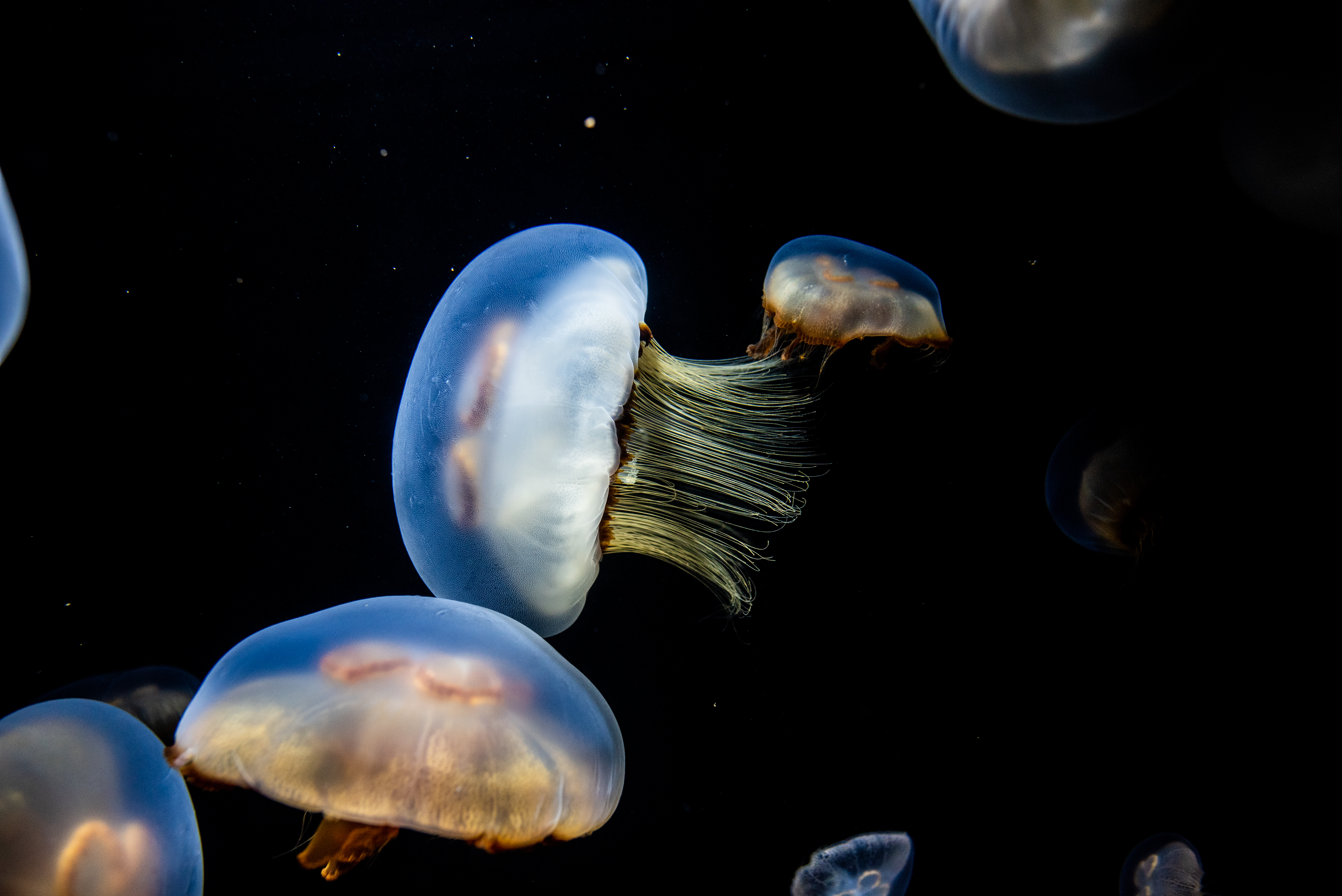

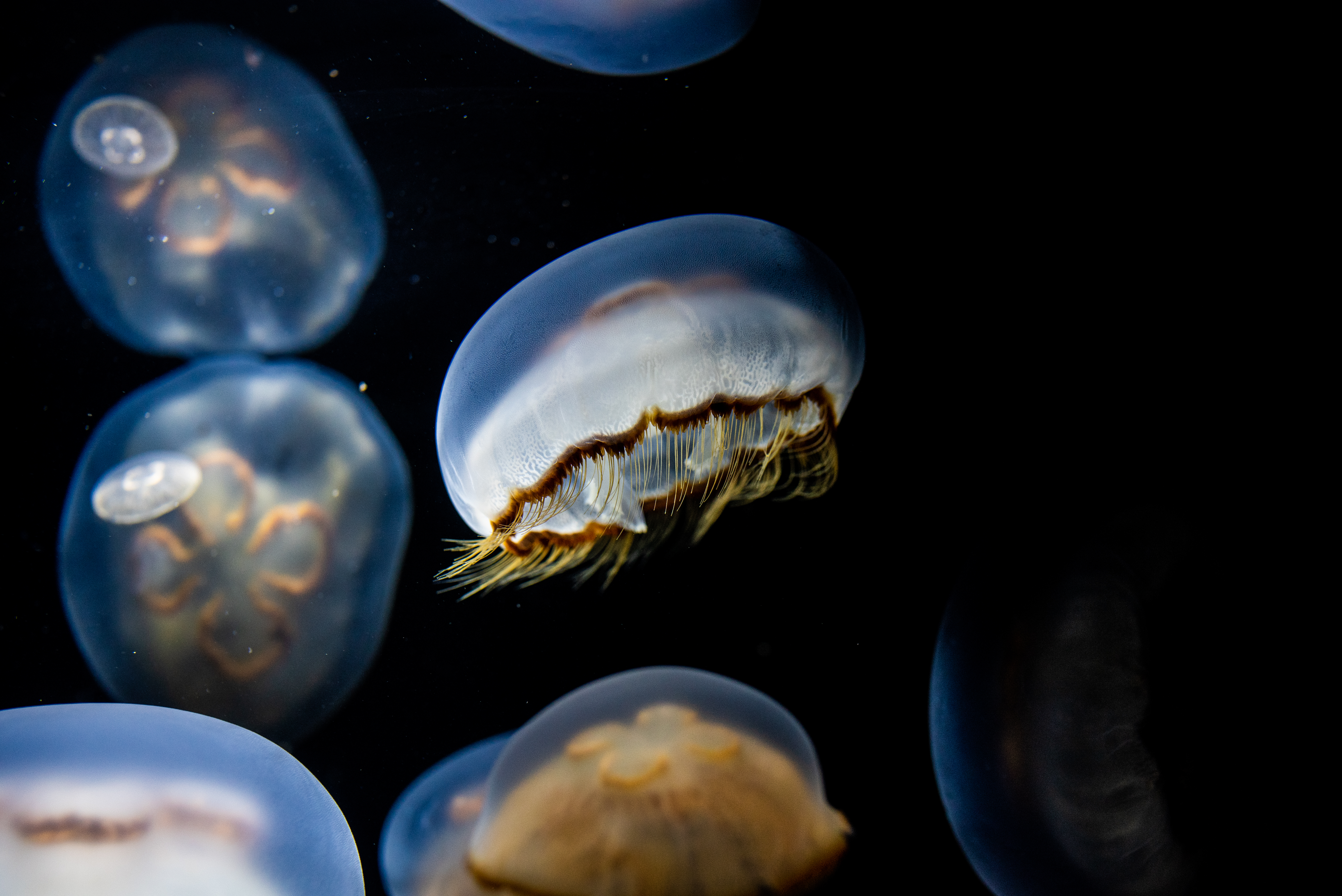

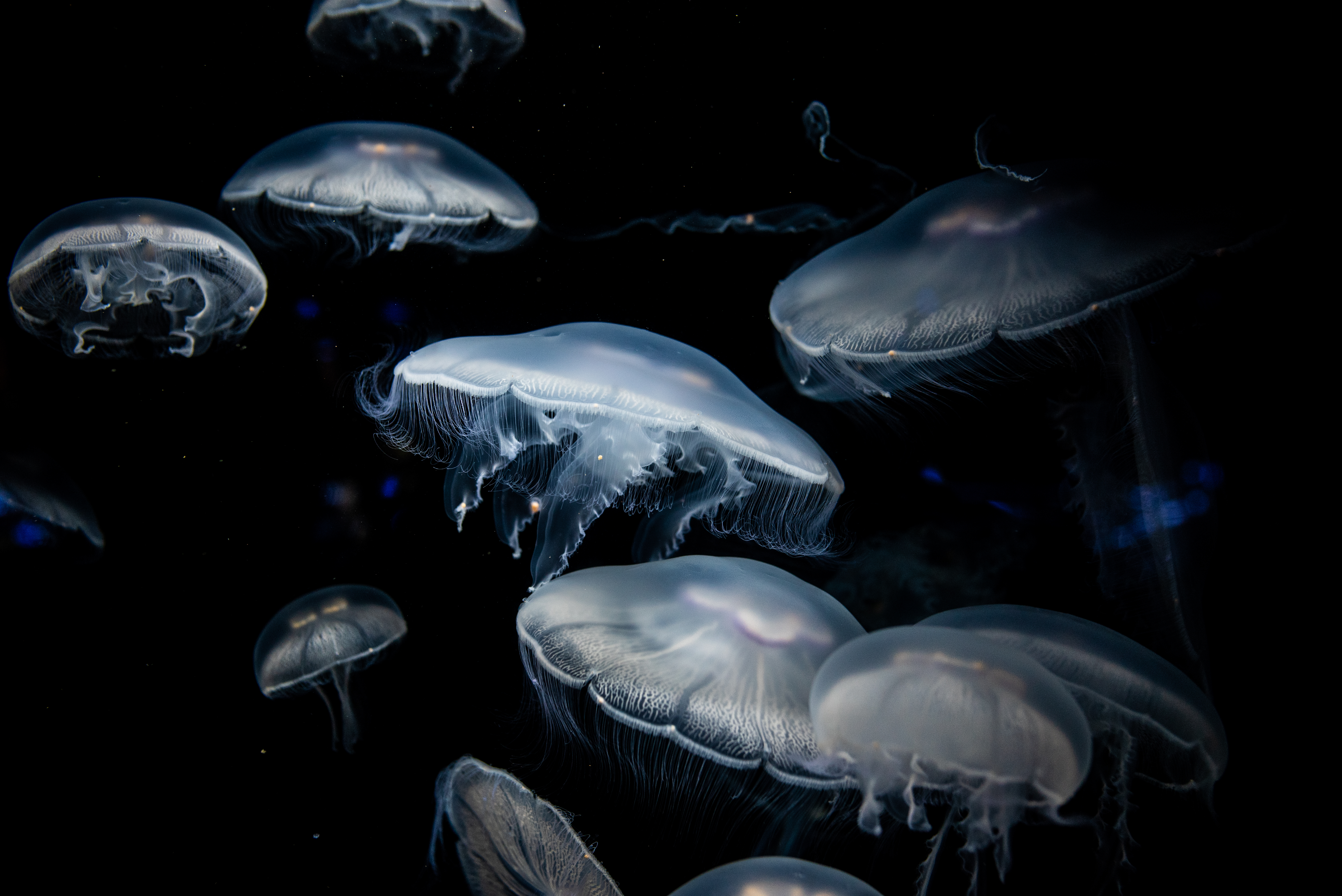

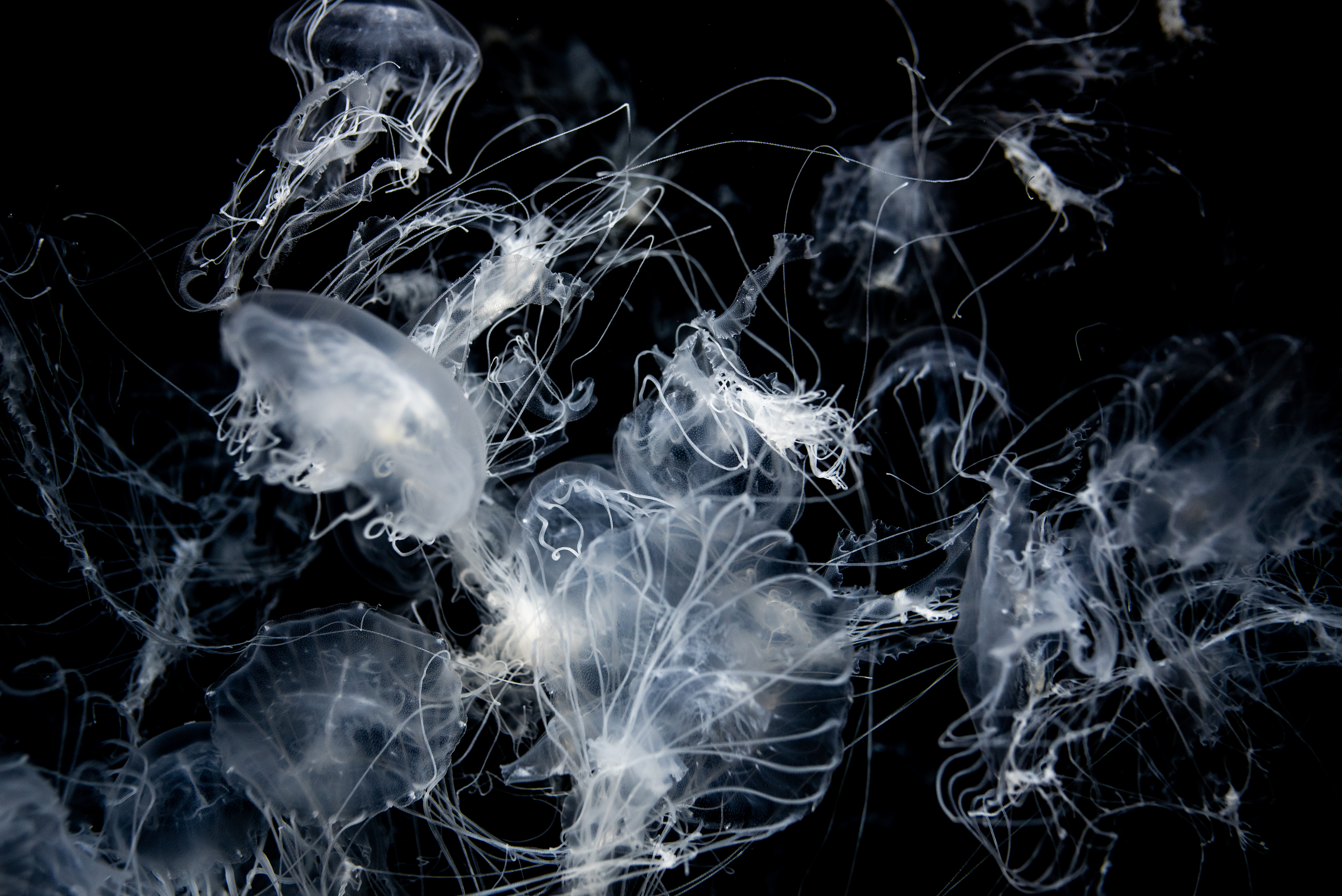

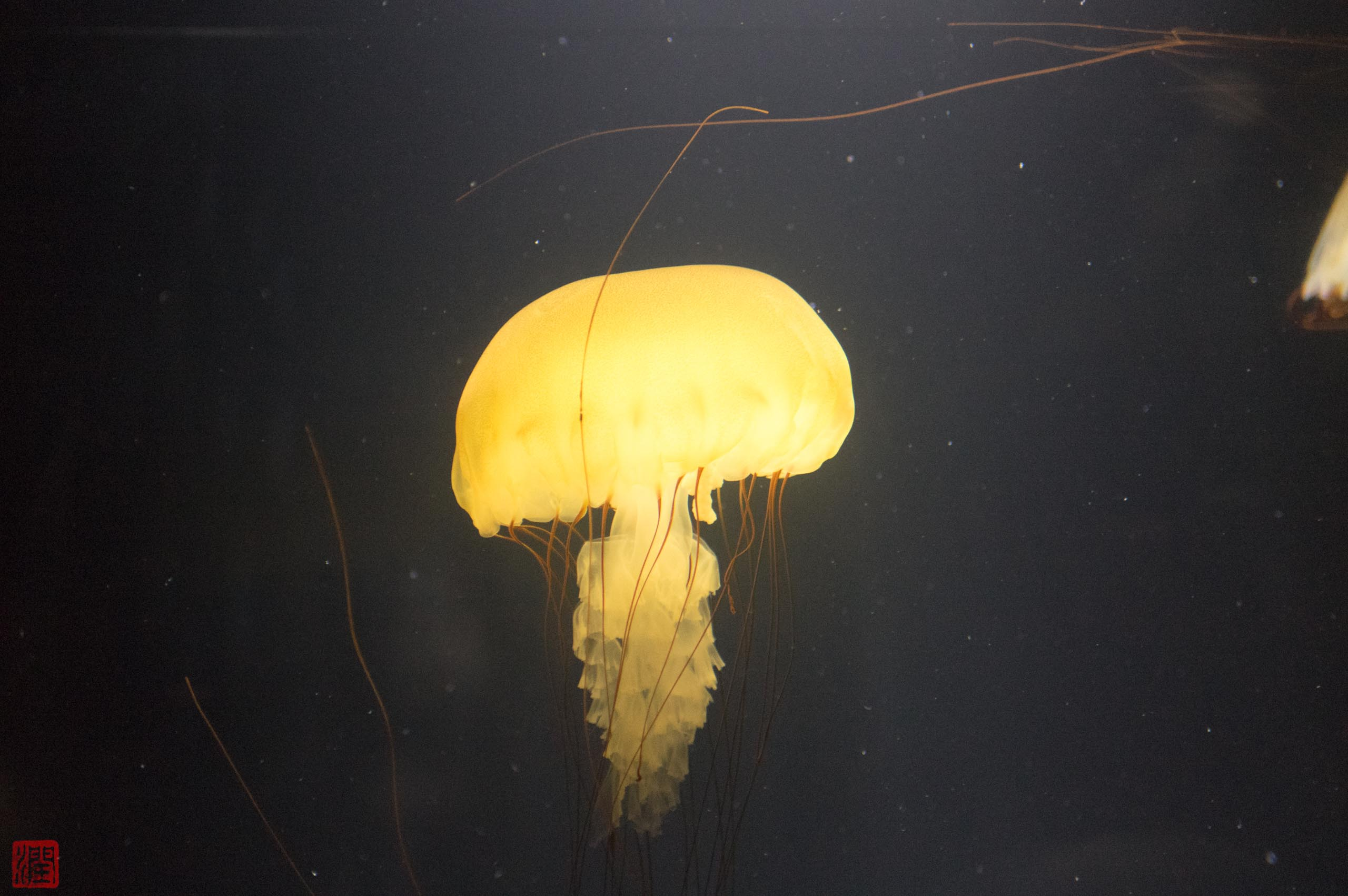

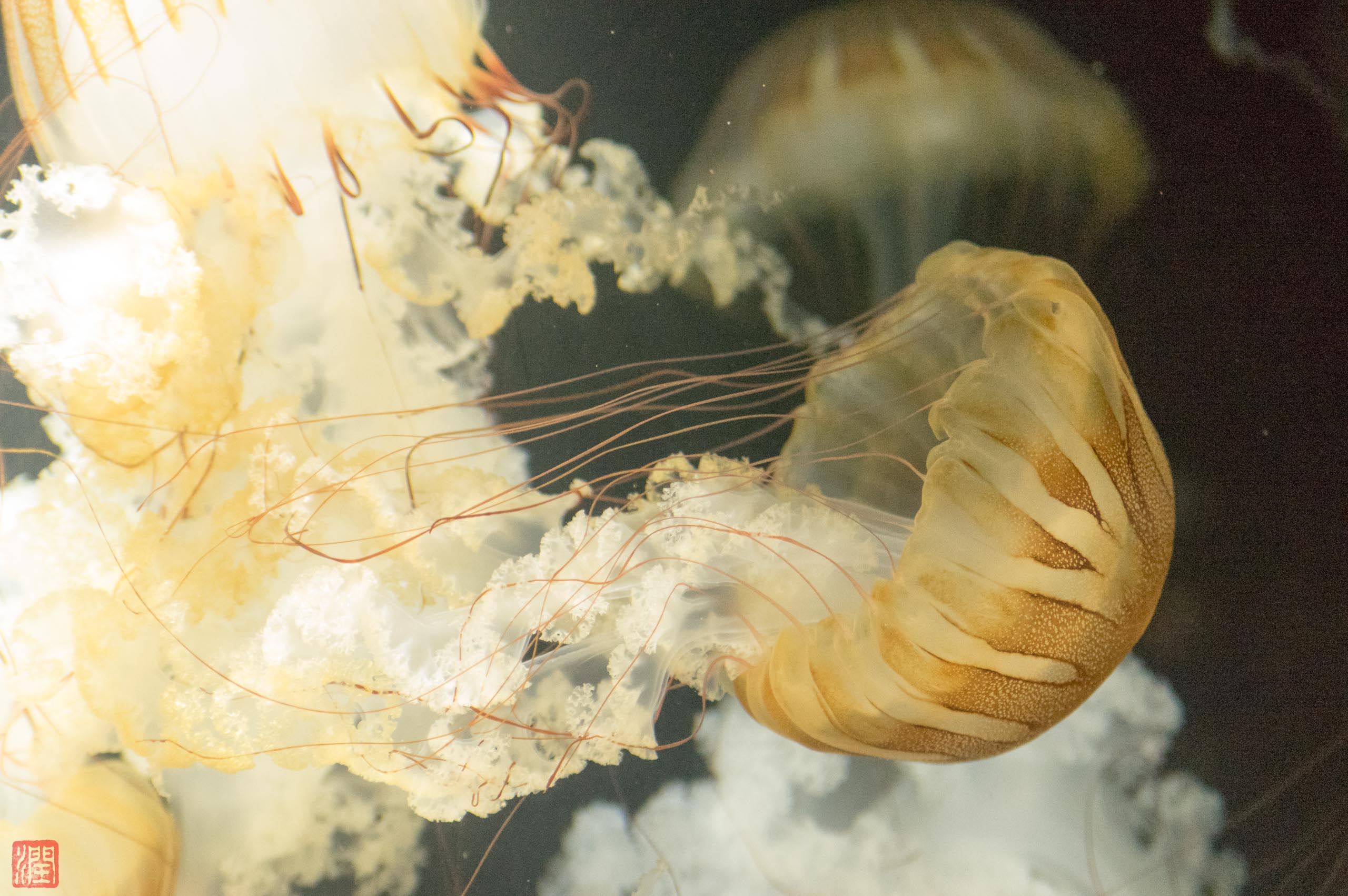

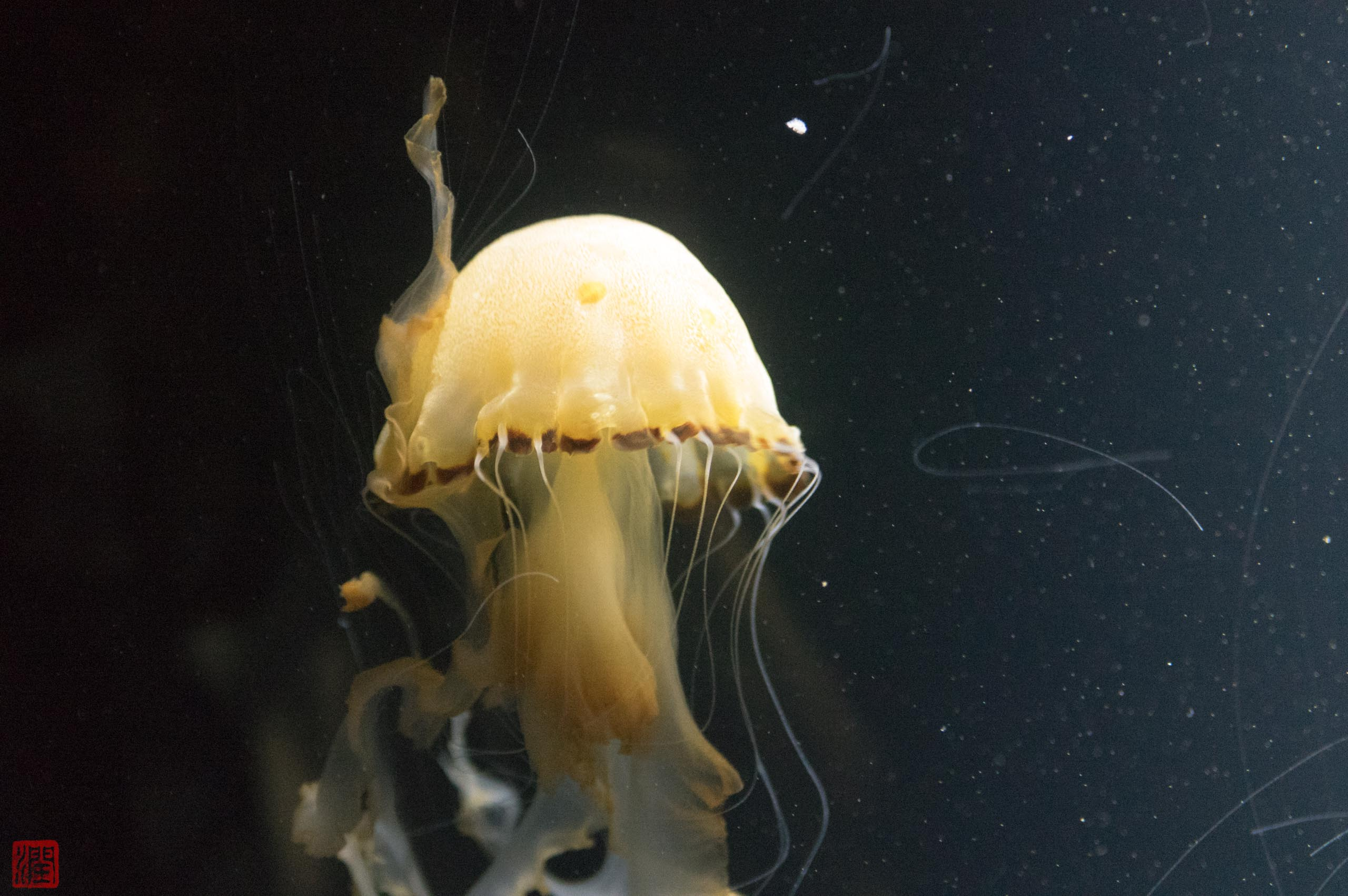

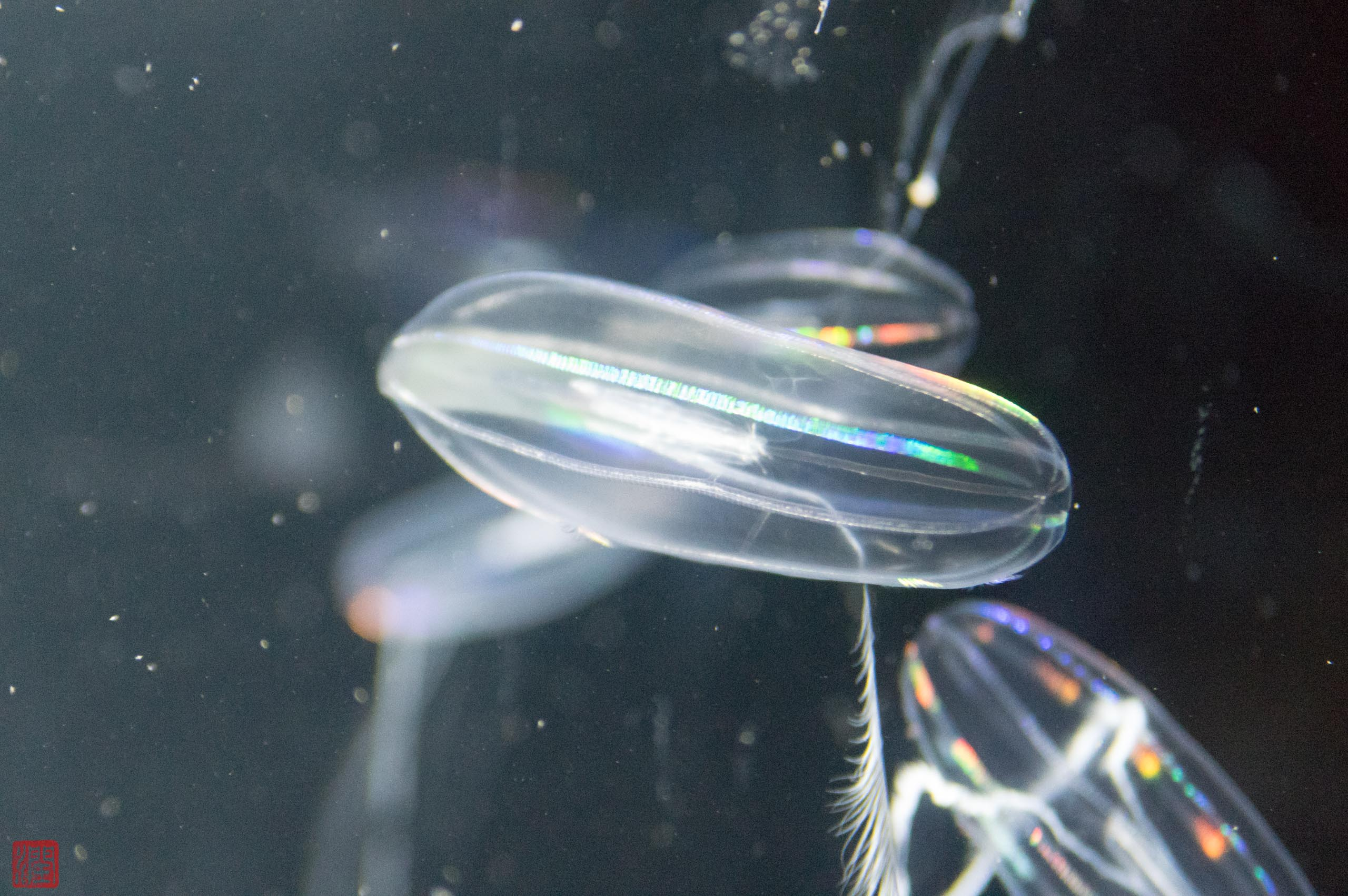

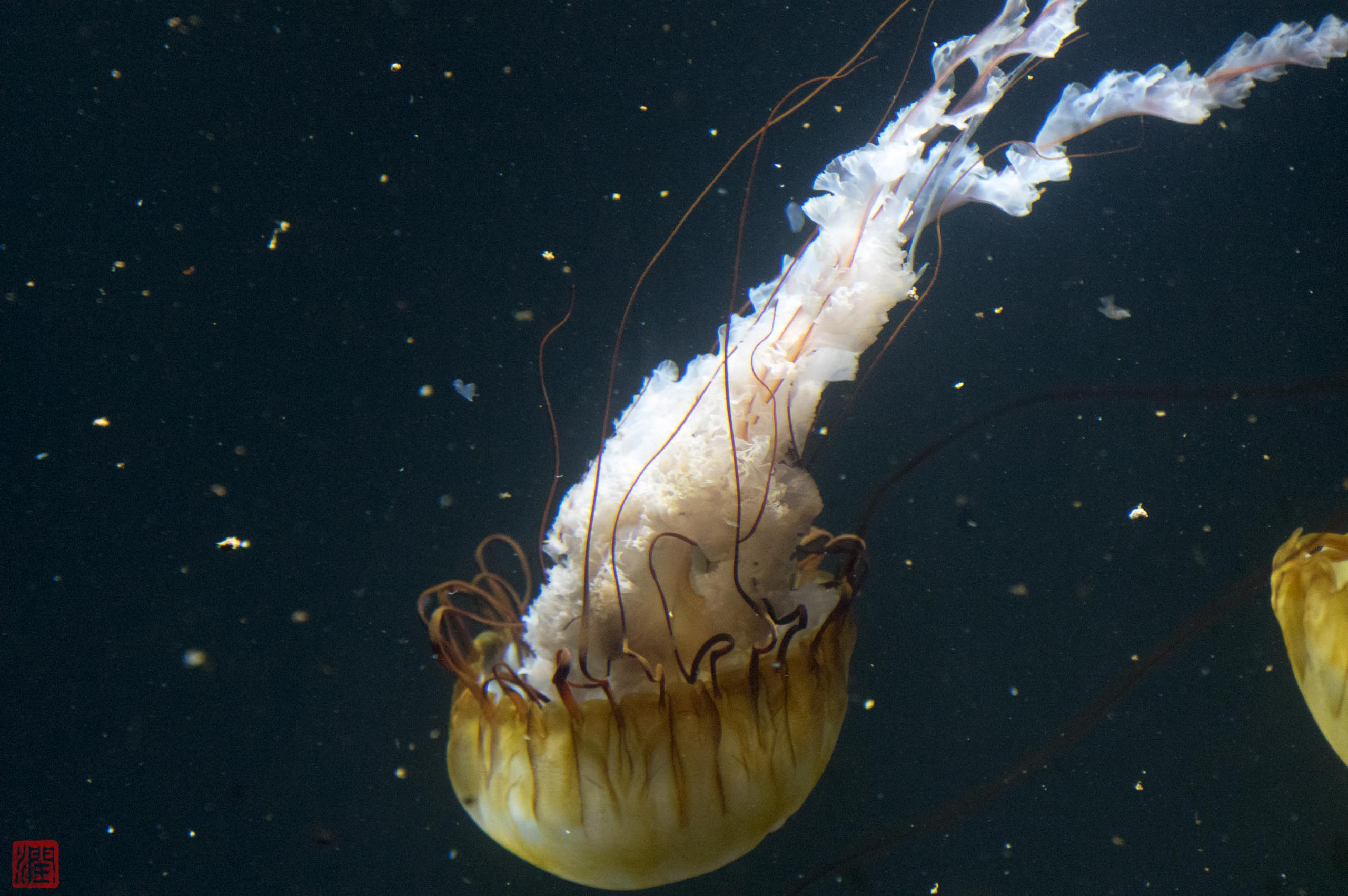

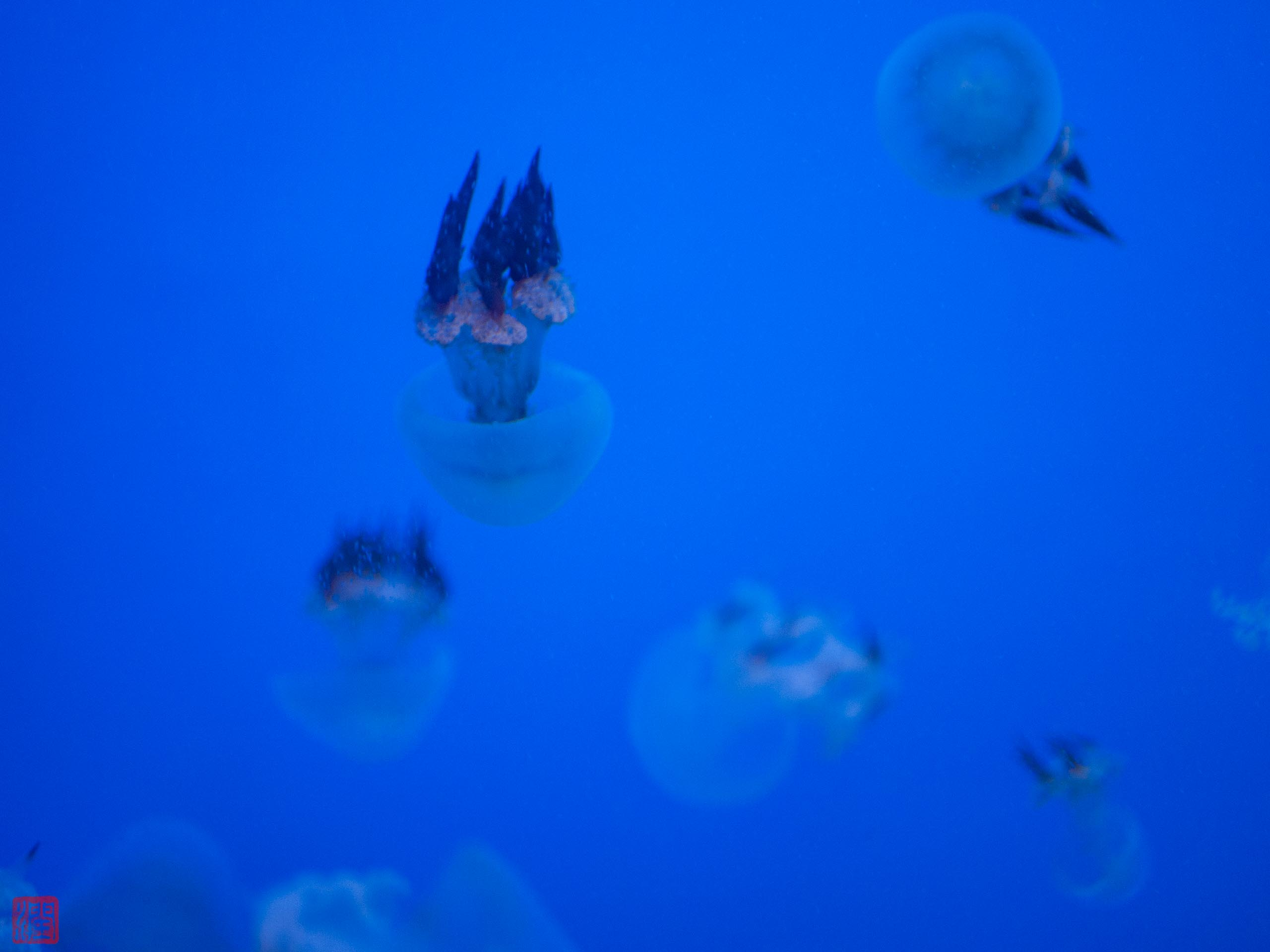

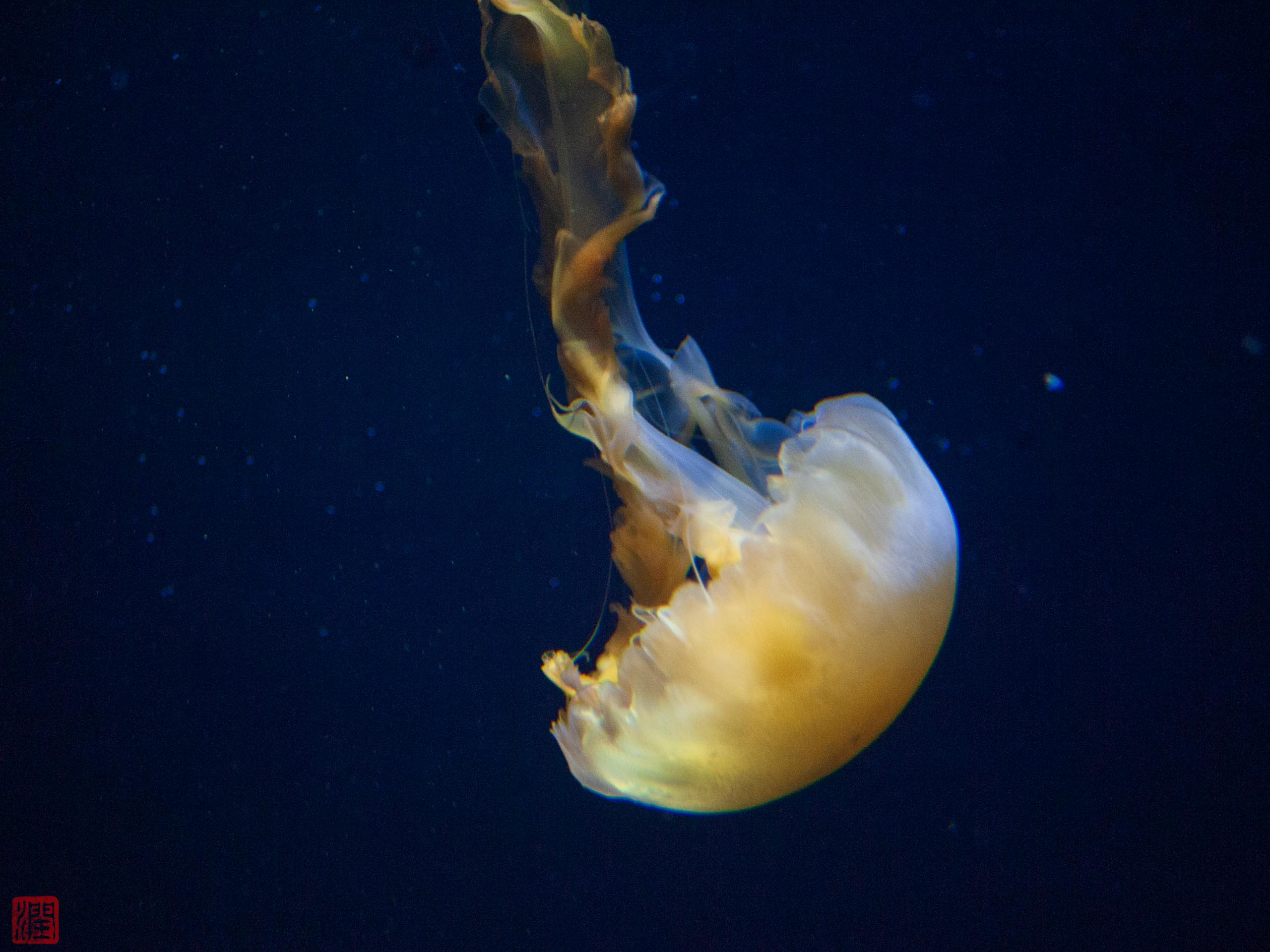

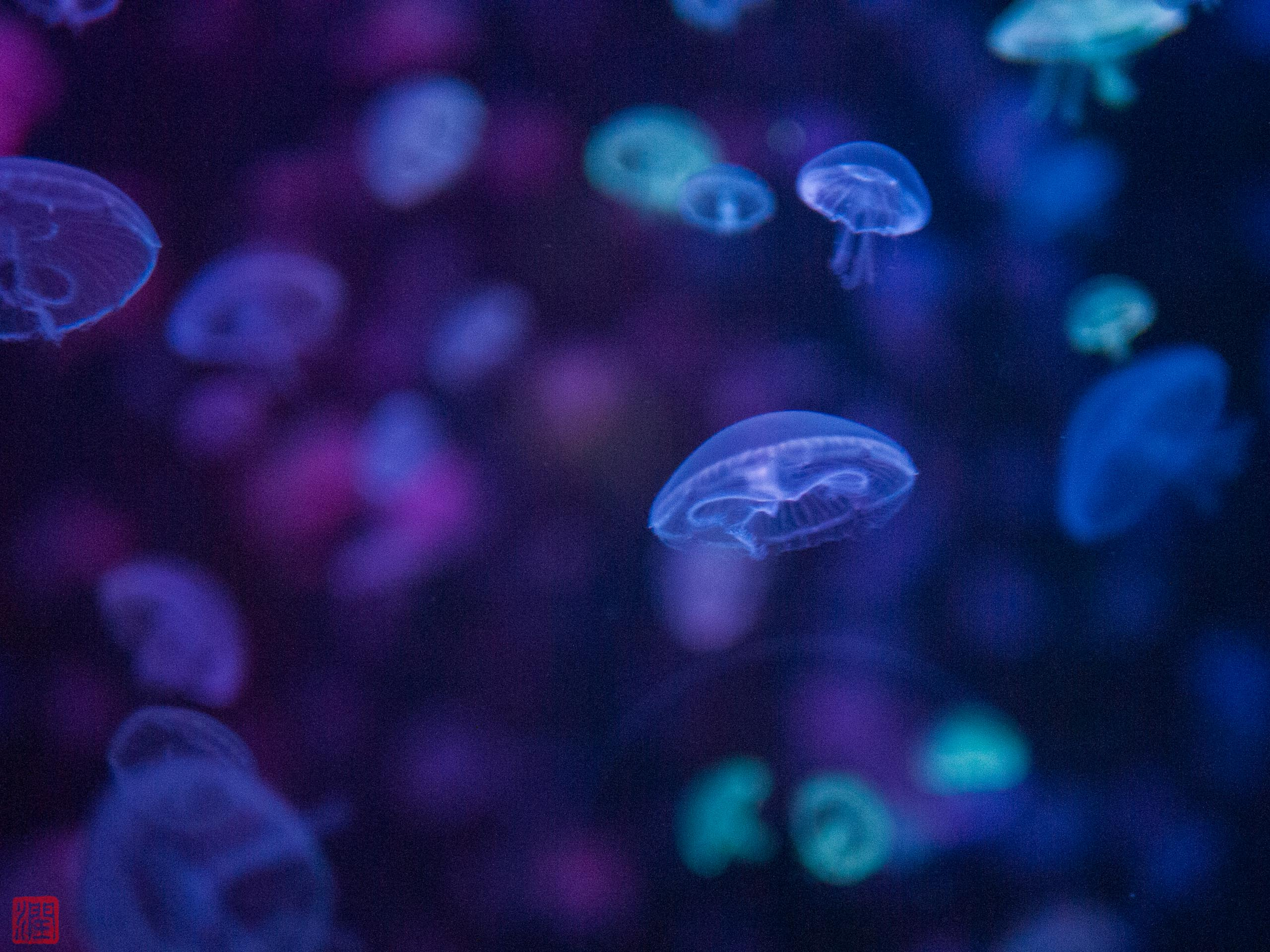

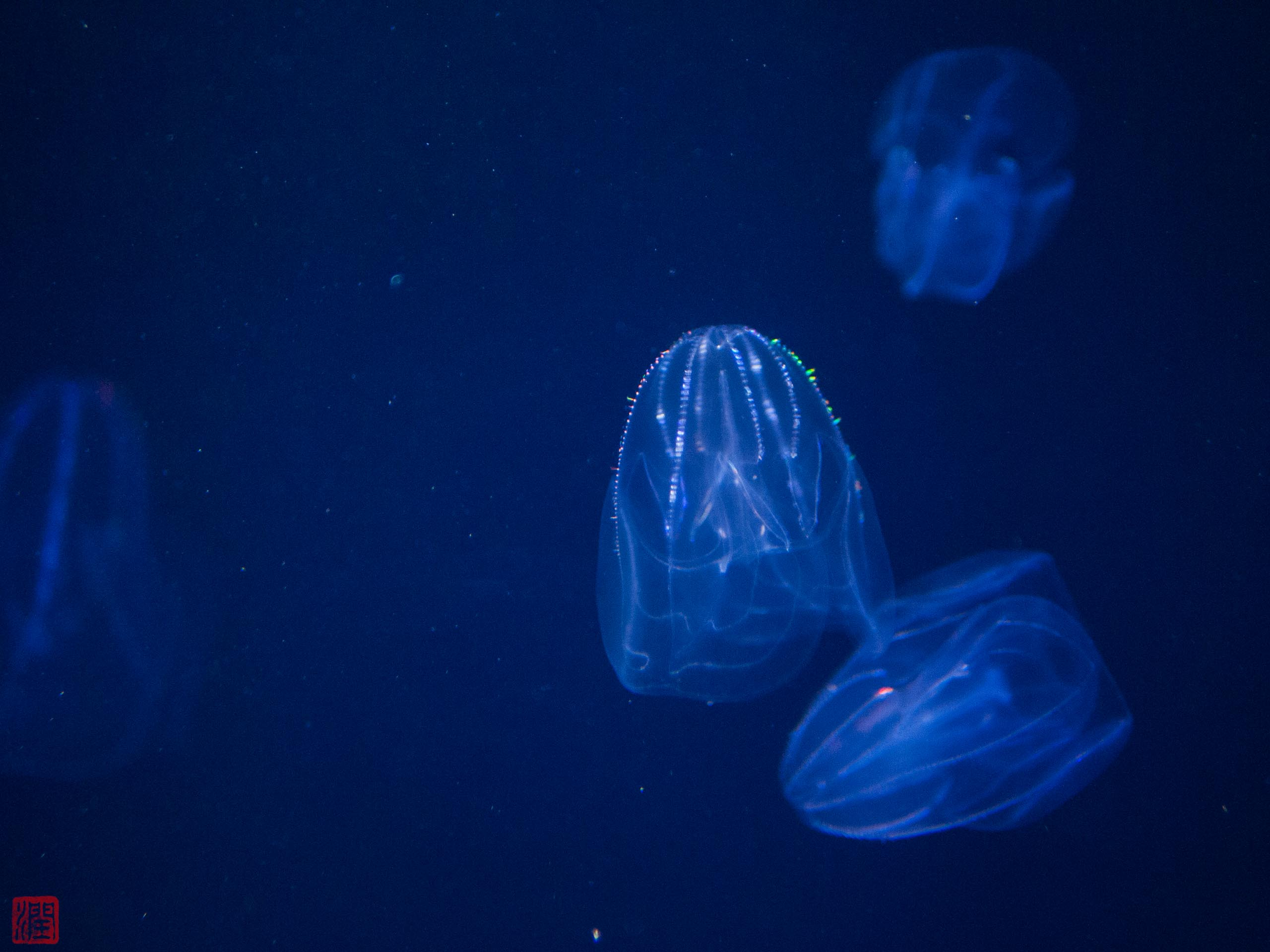

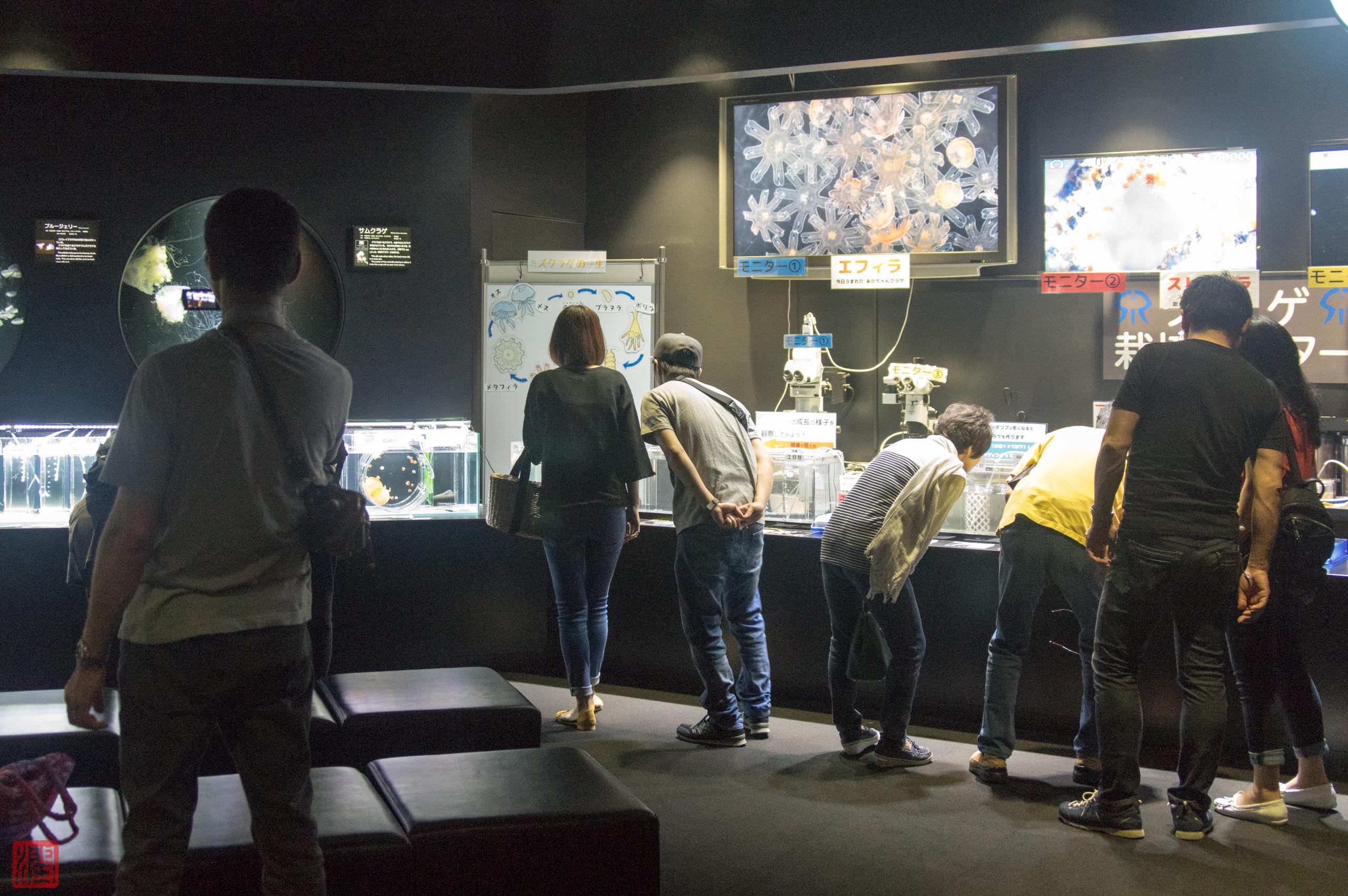
Educational section with a large lecture hall and a special exhibition section describing the growth and development of jellyfish

=== Other marine creatures ===
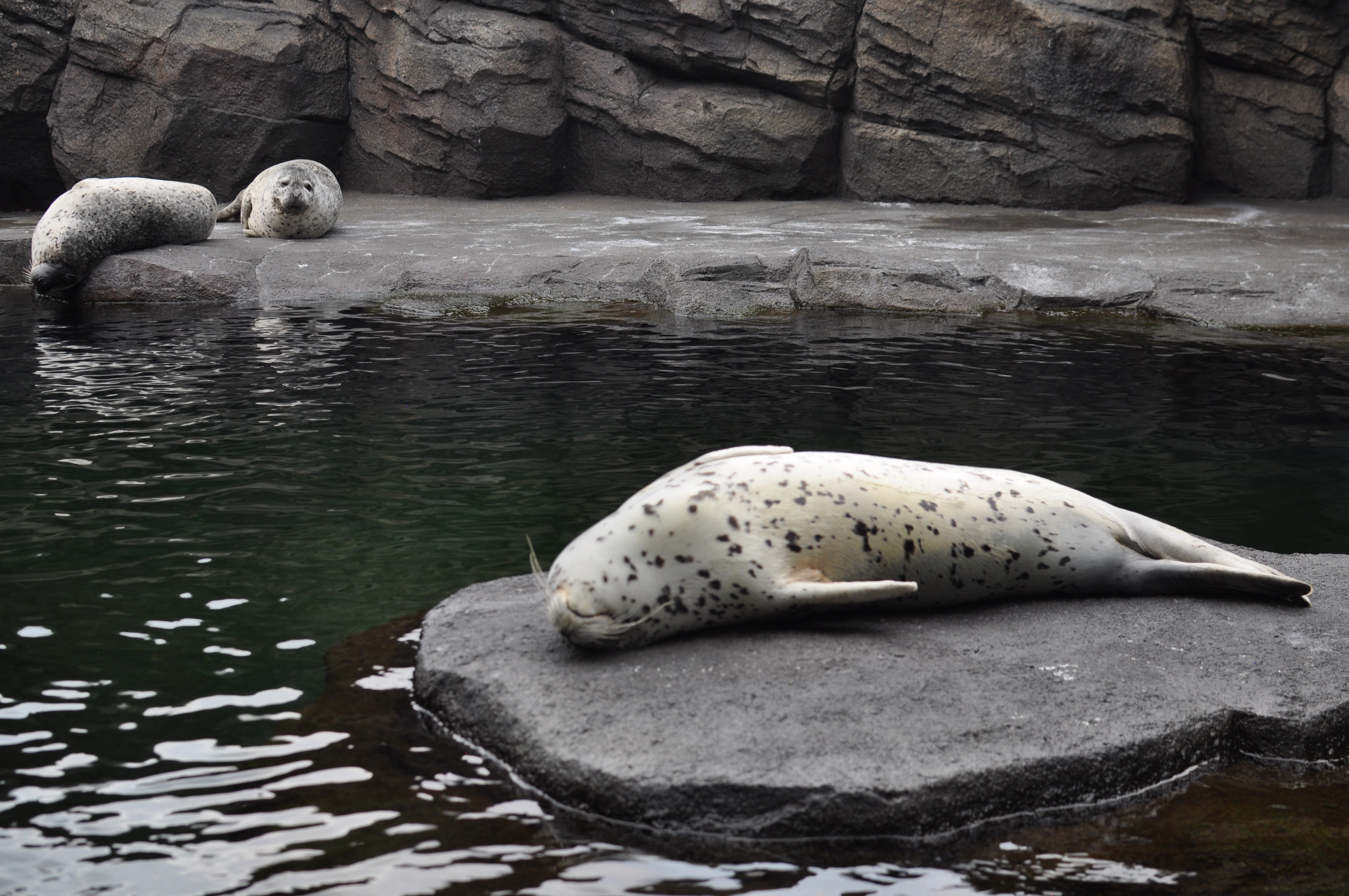
Spotted seals

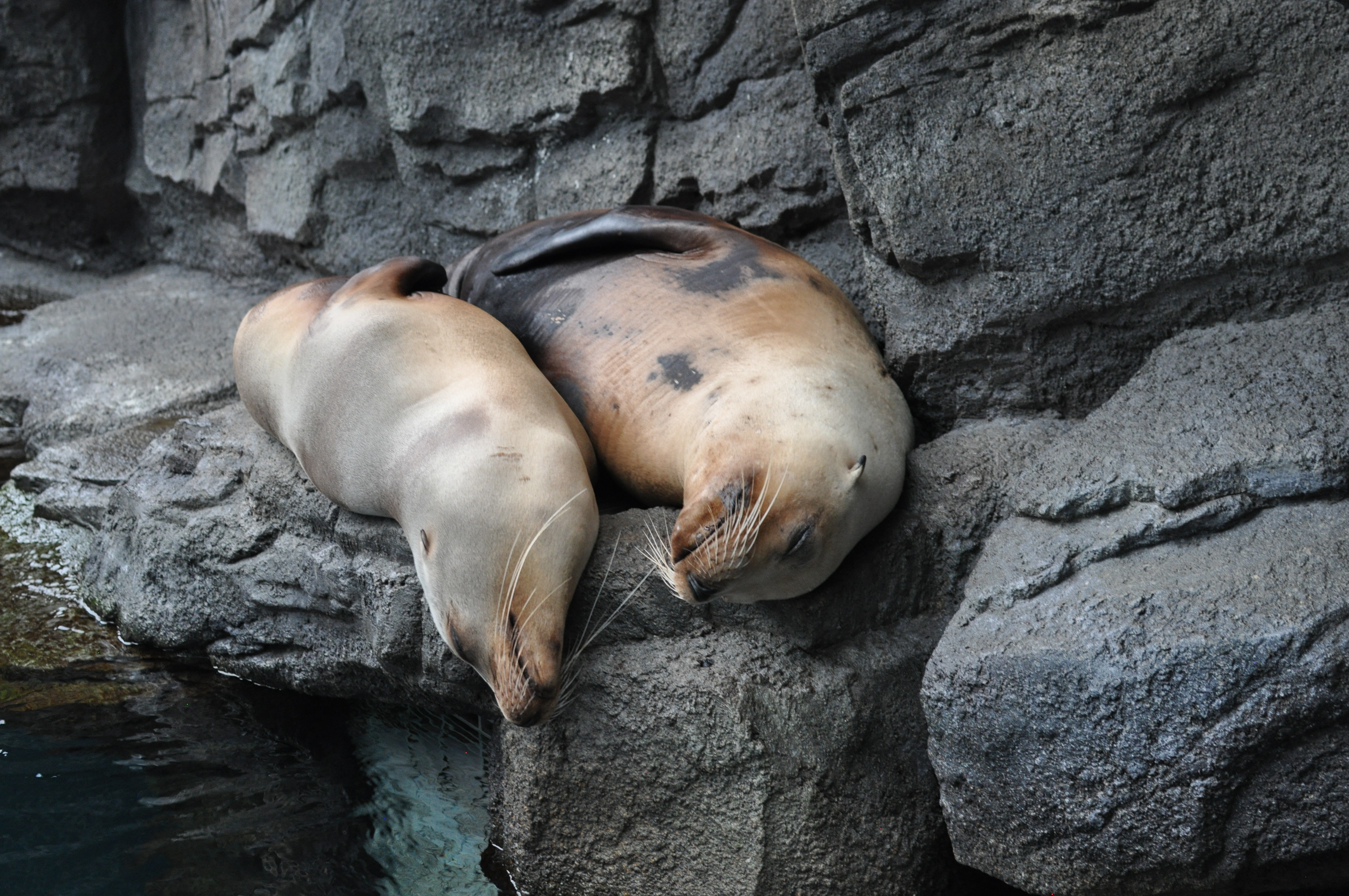

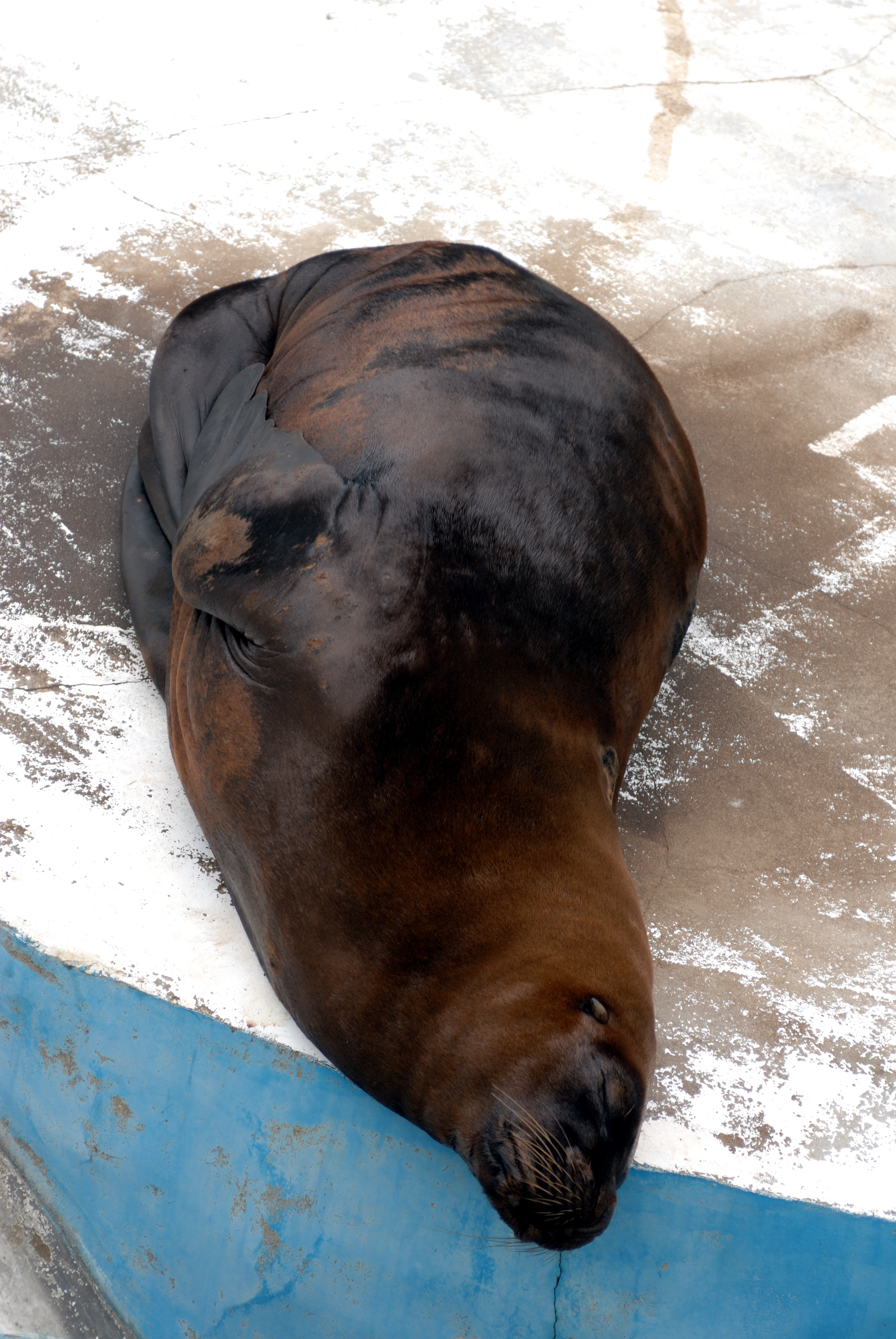

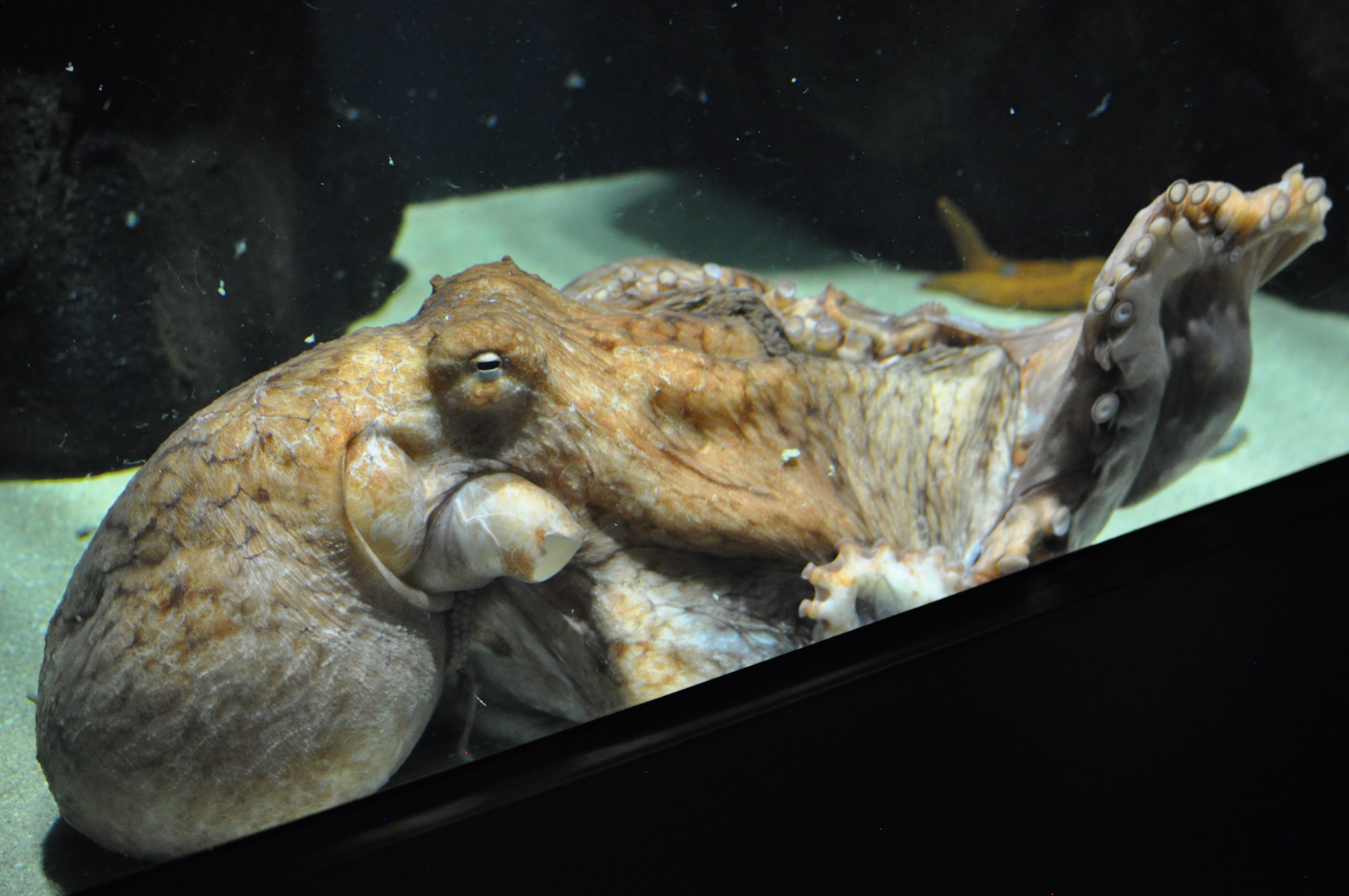
Octopus

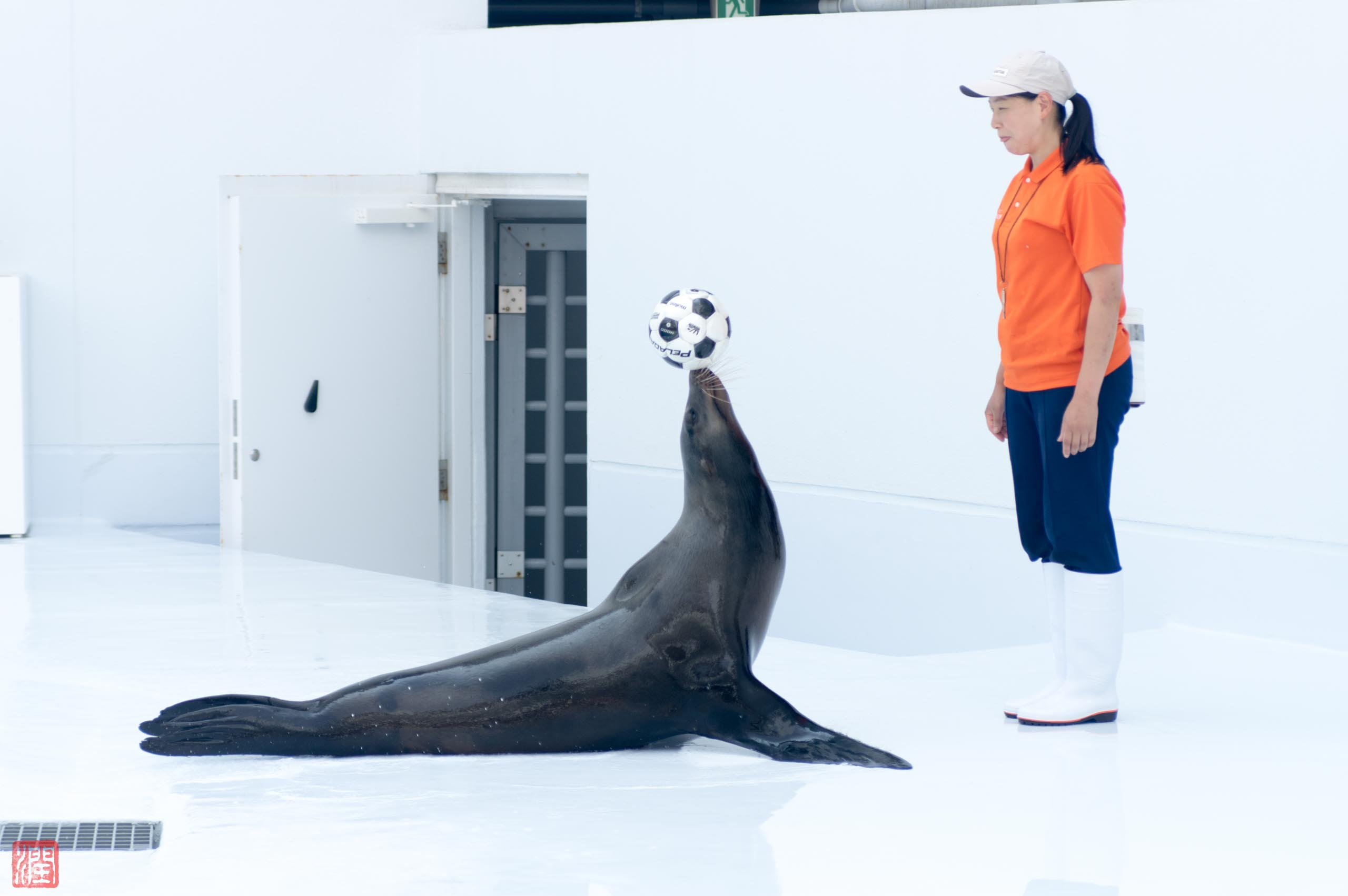
Sea lion show

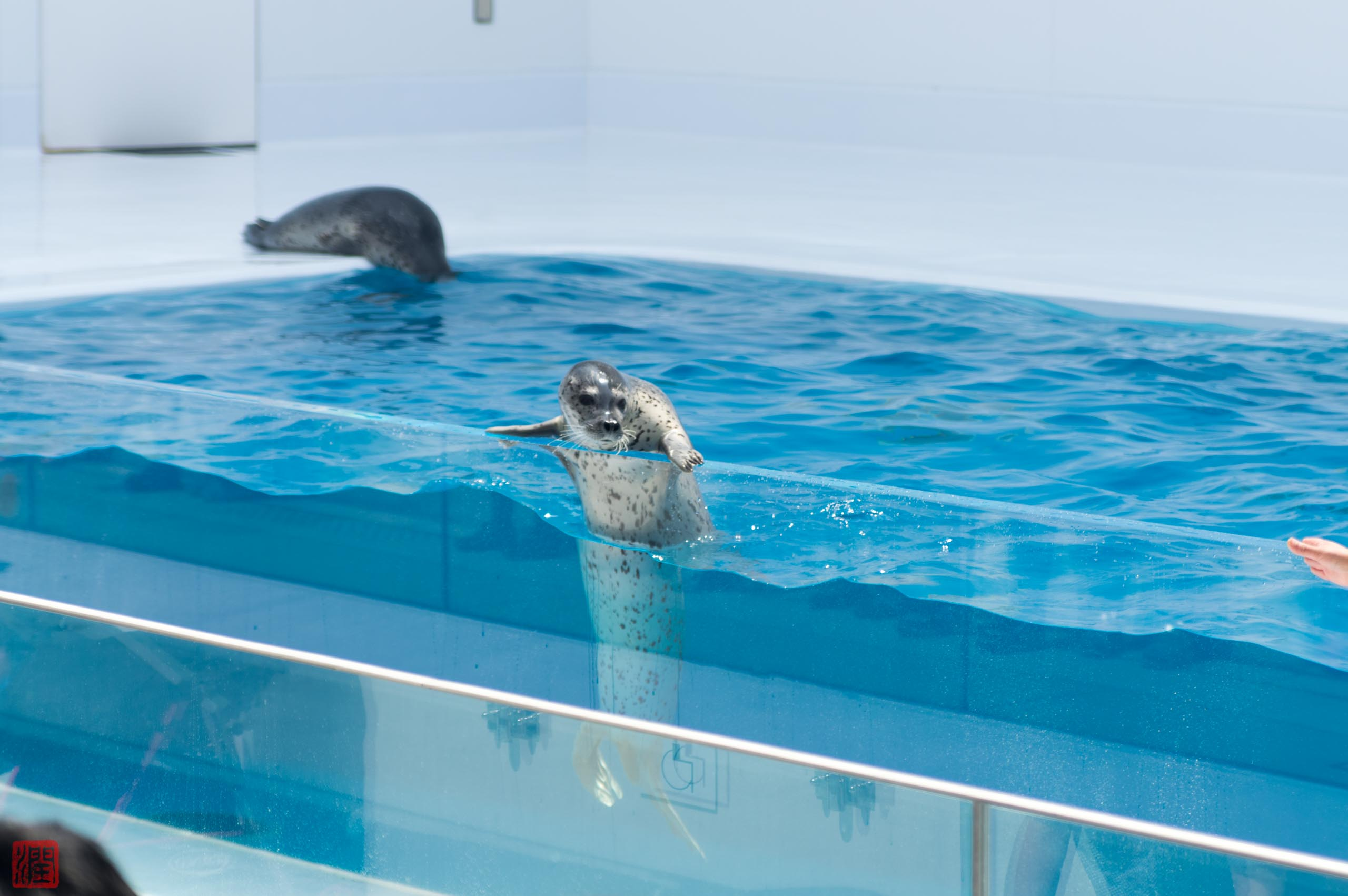

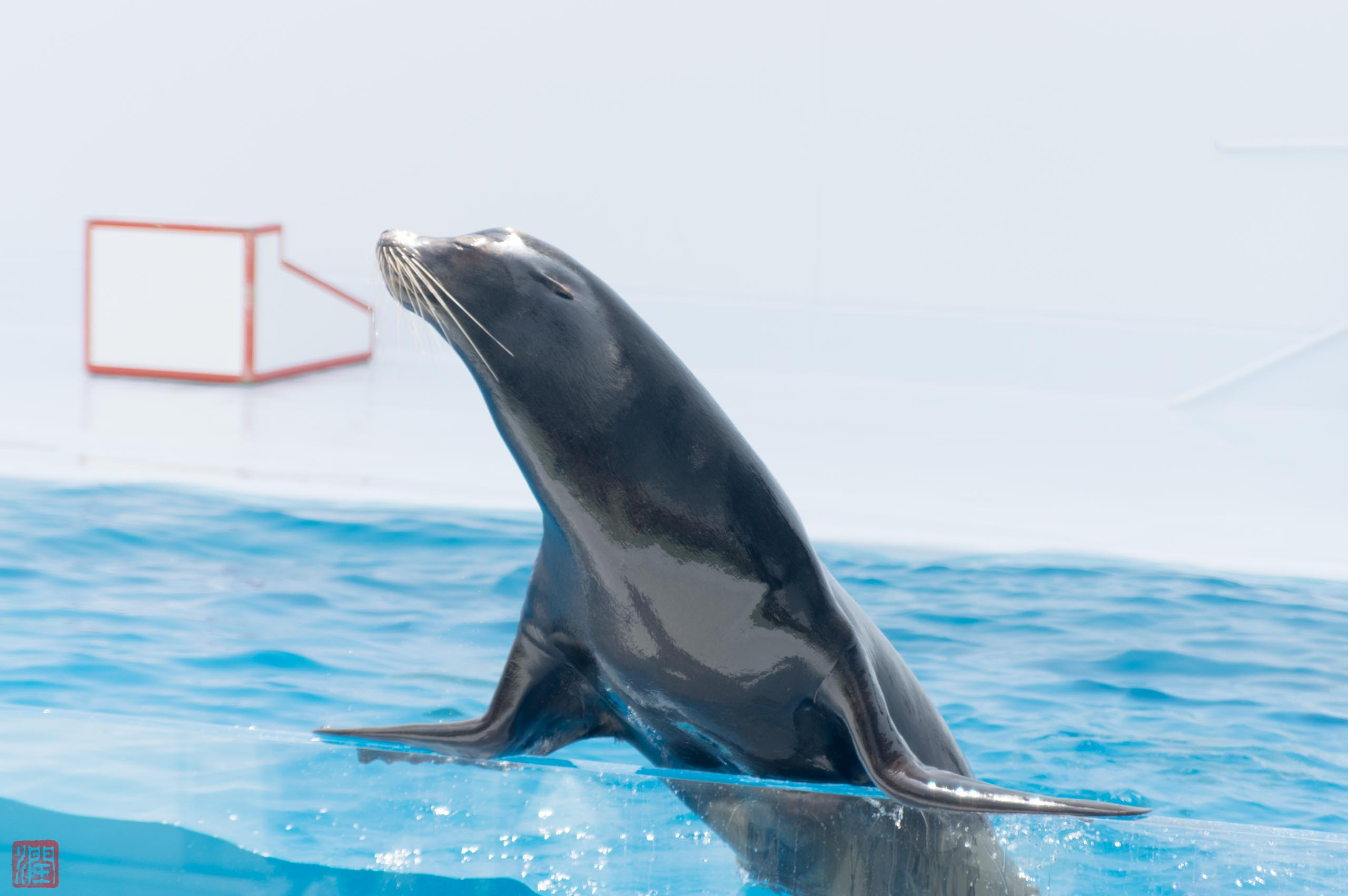

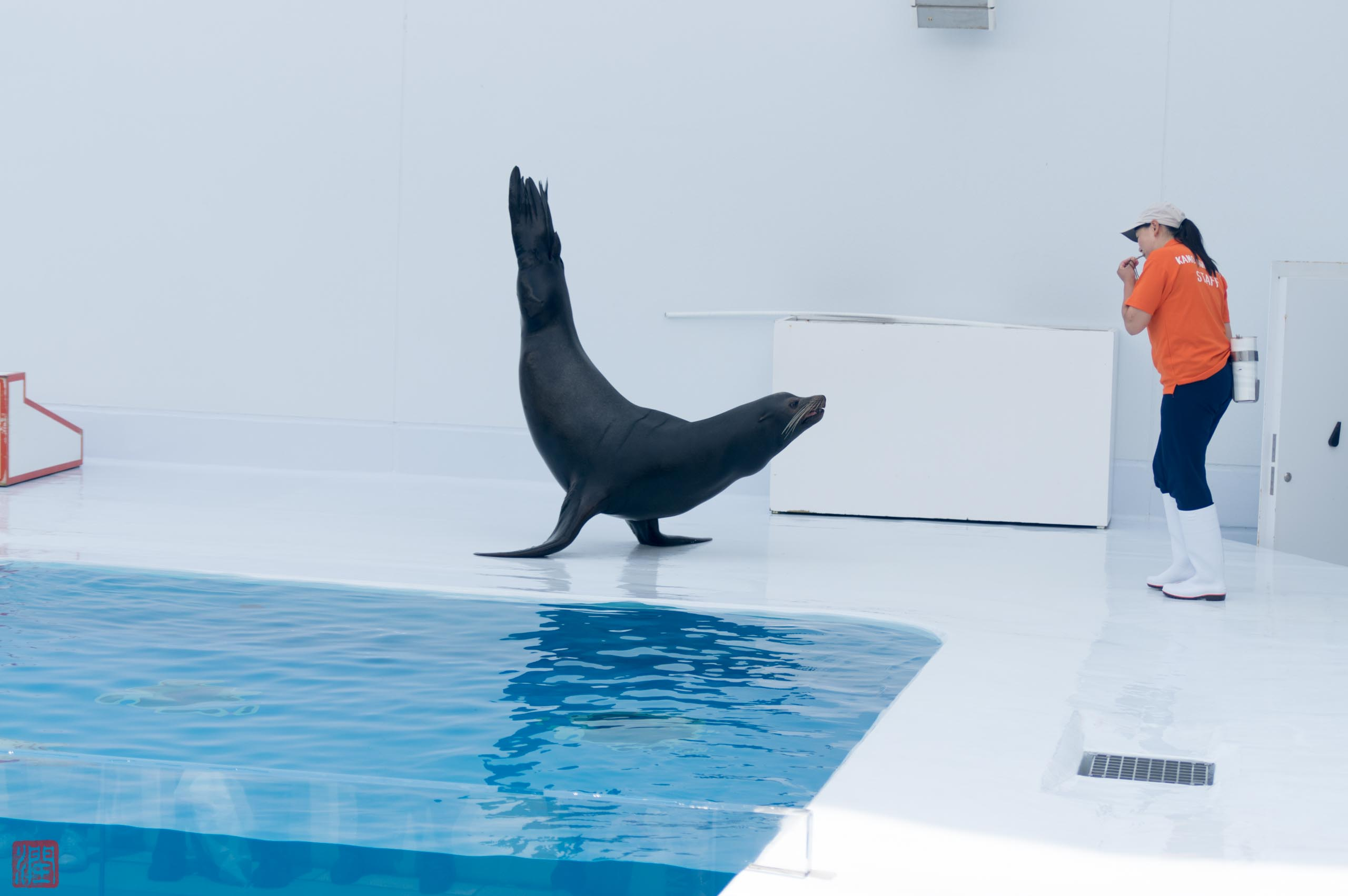

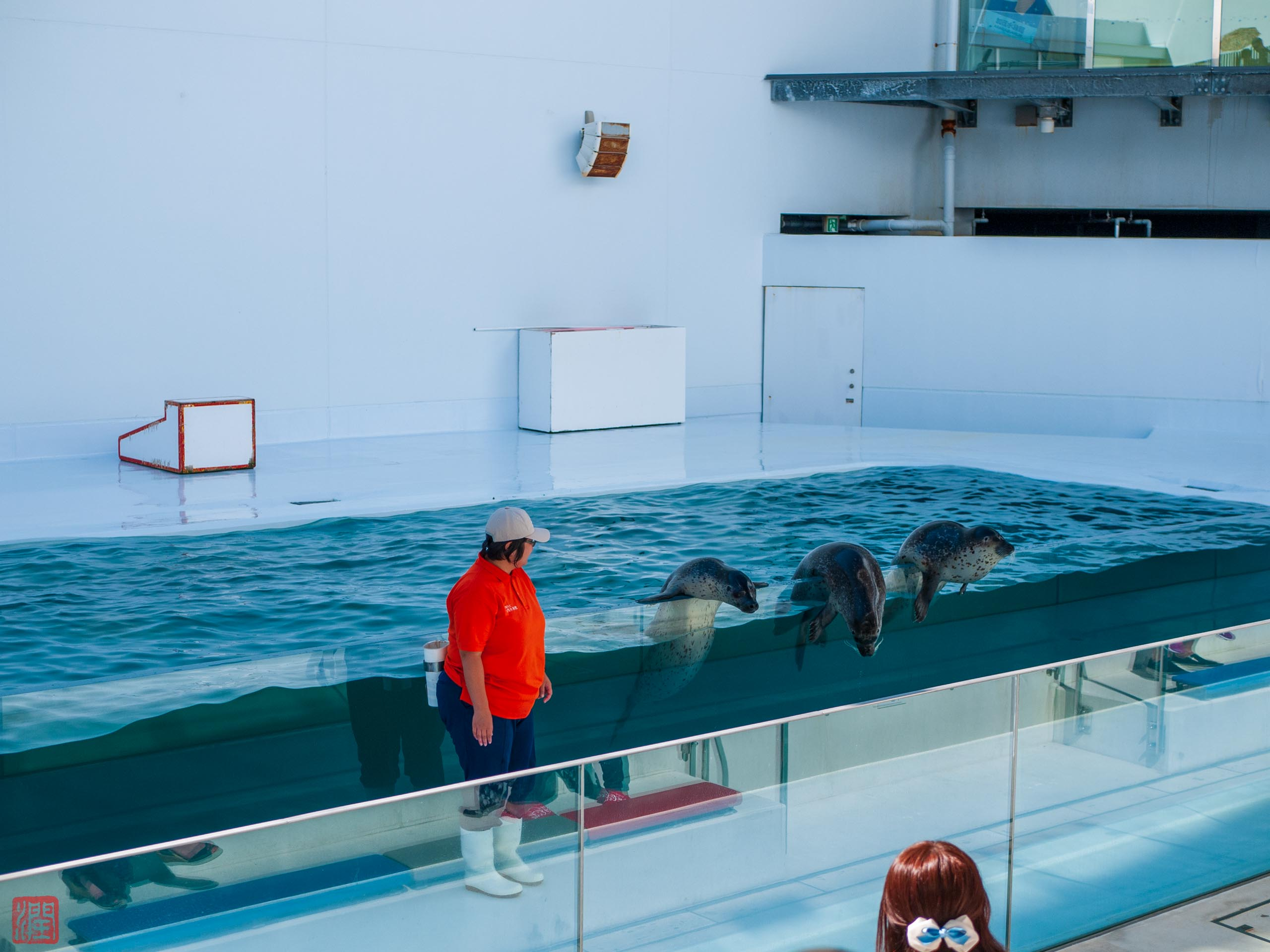

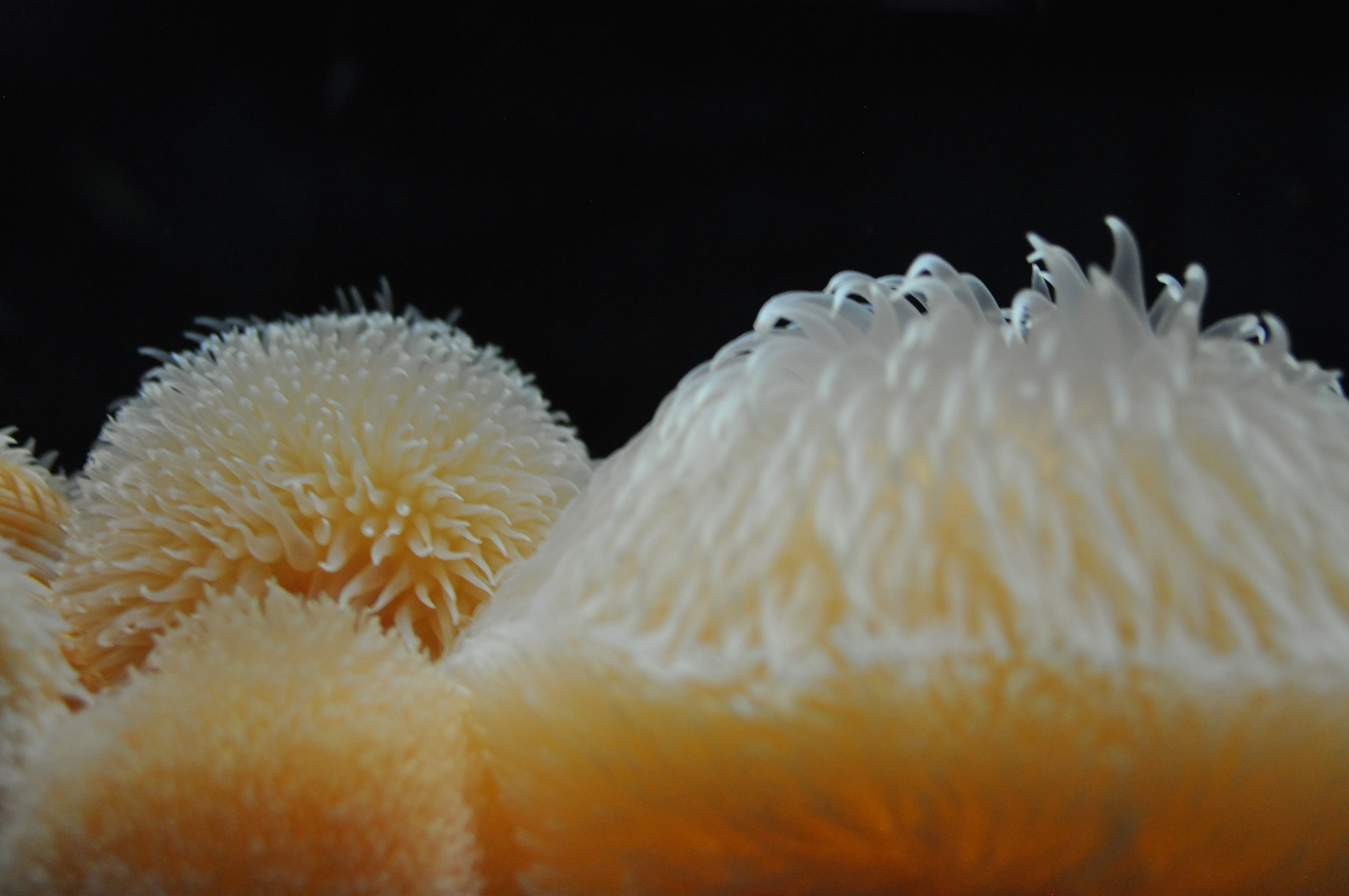
Sea anemone

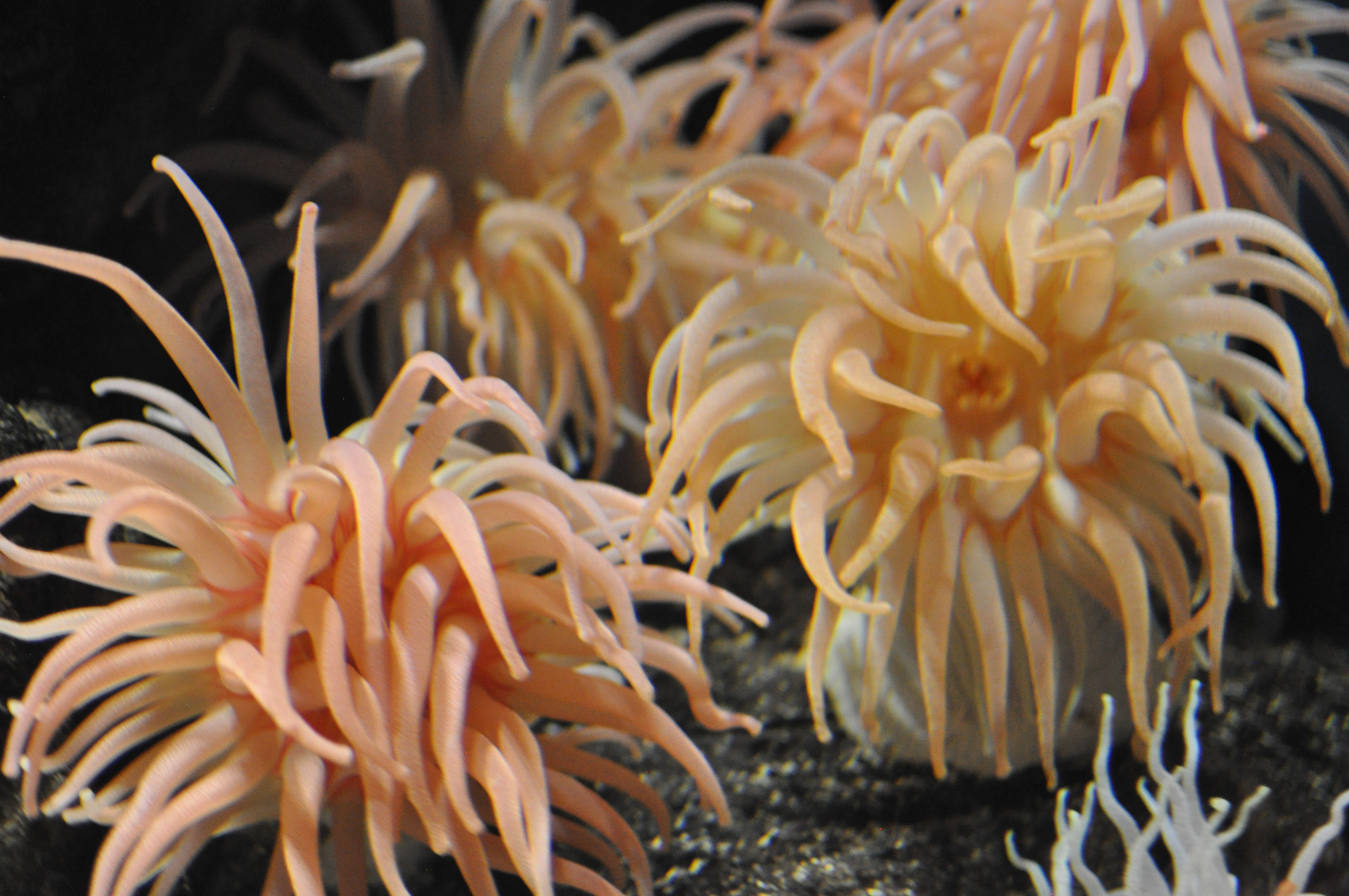

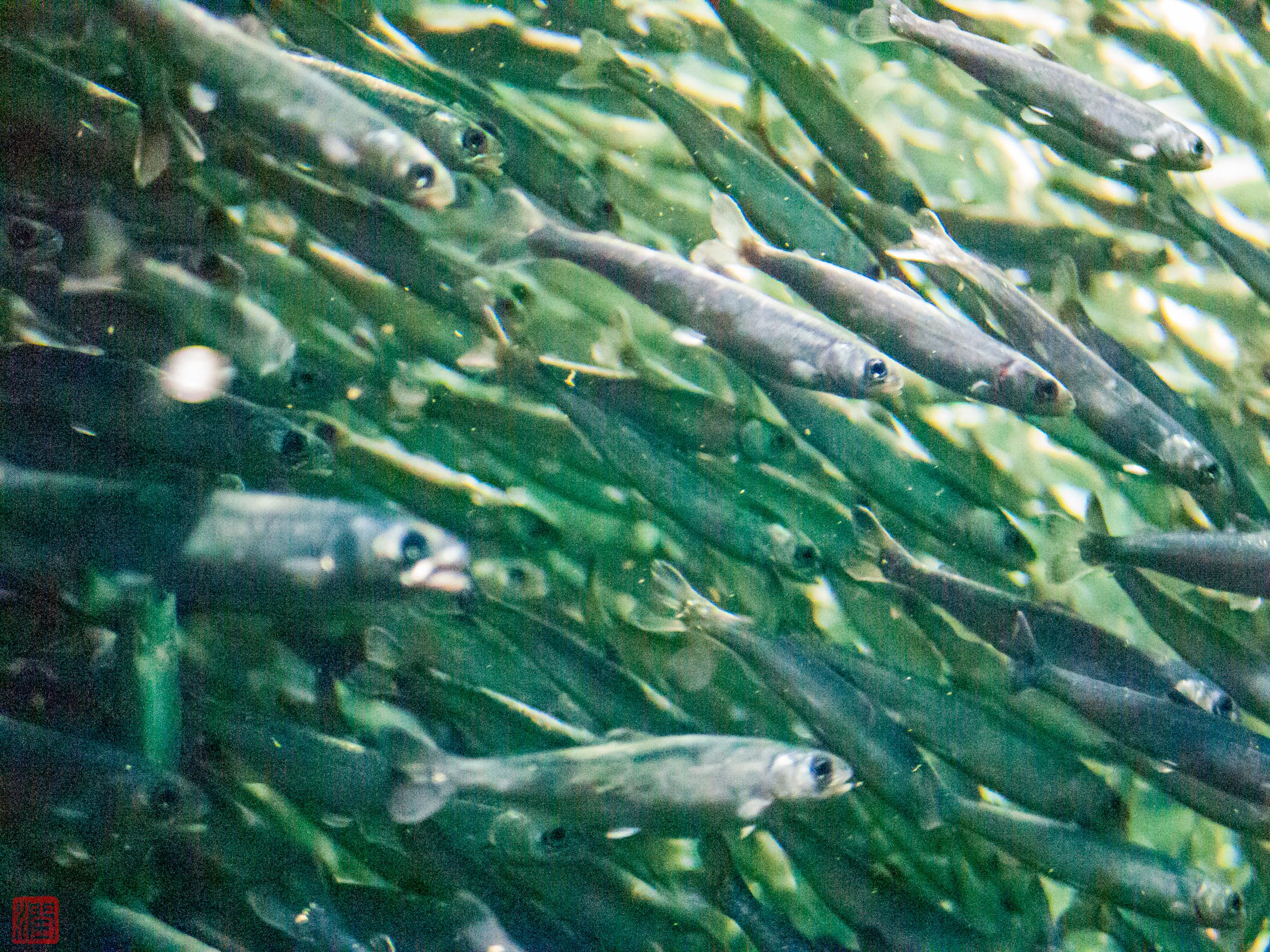

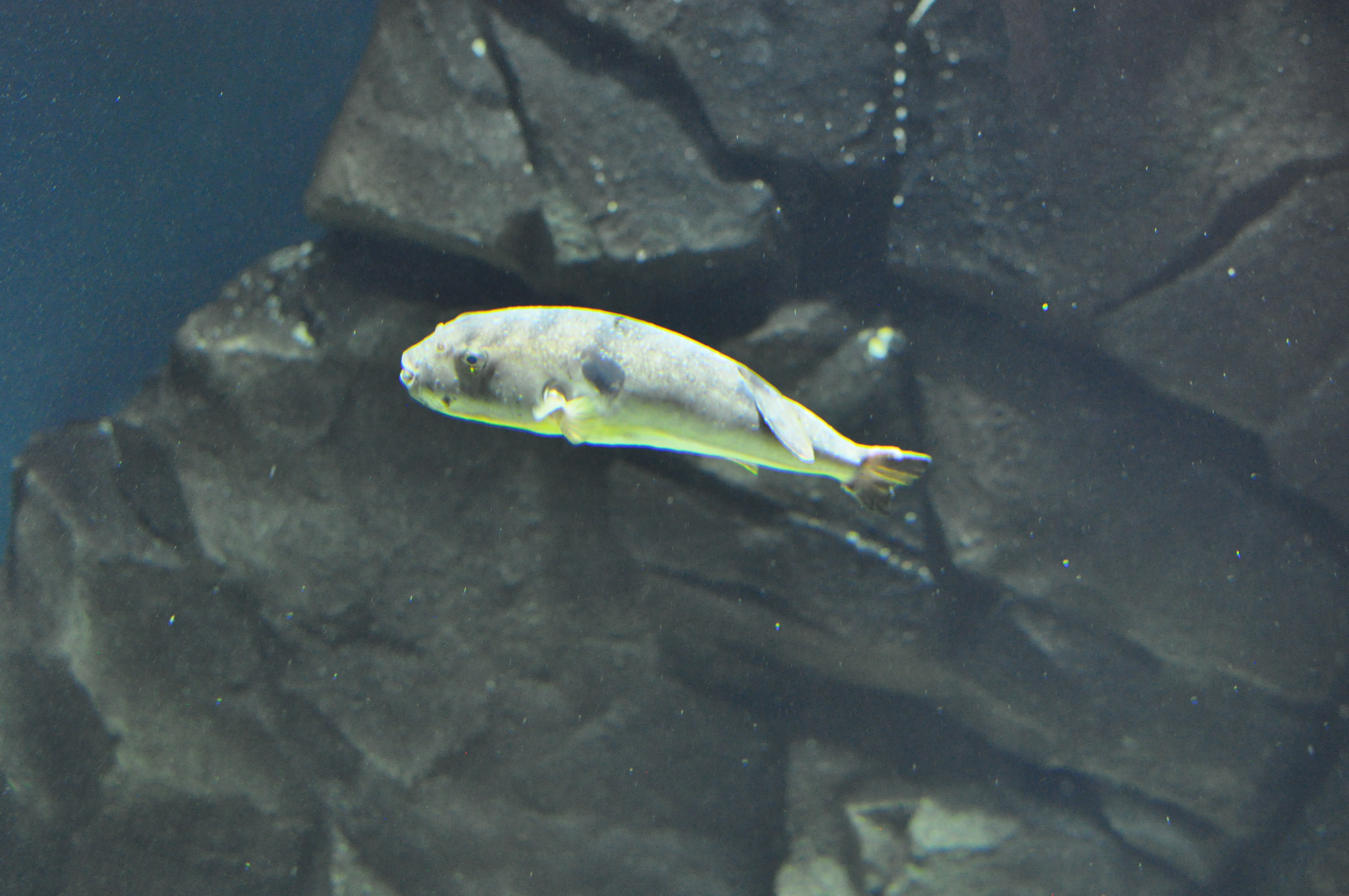

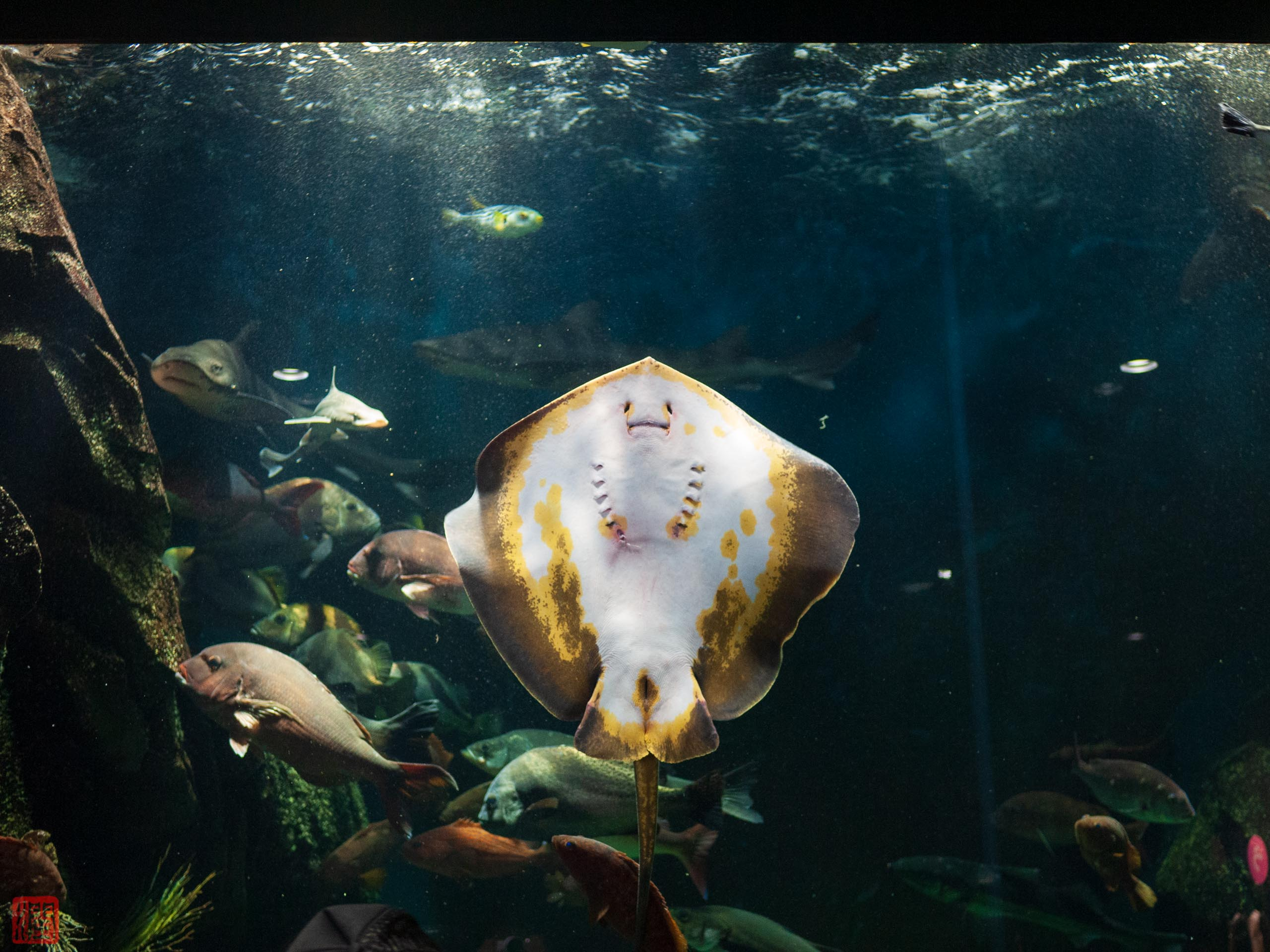

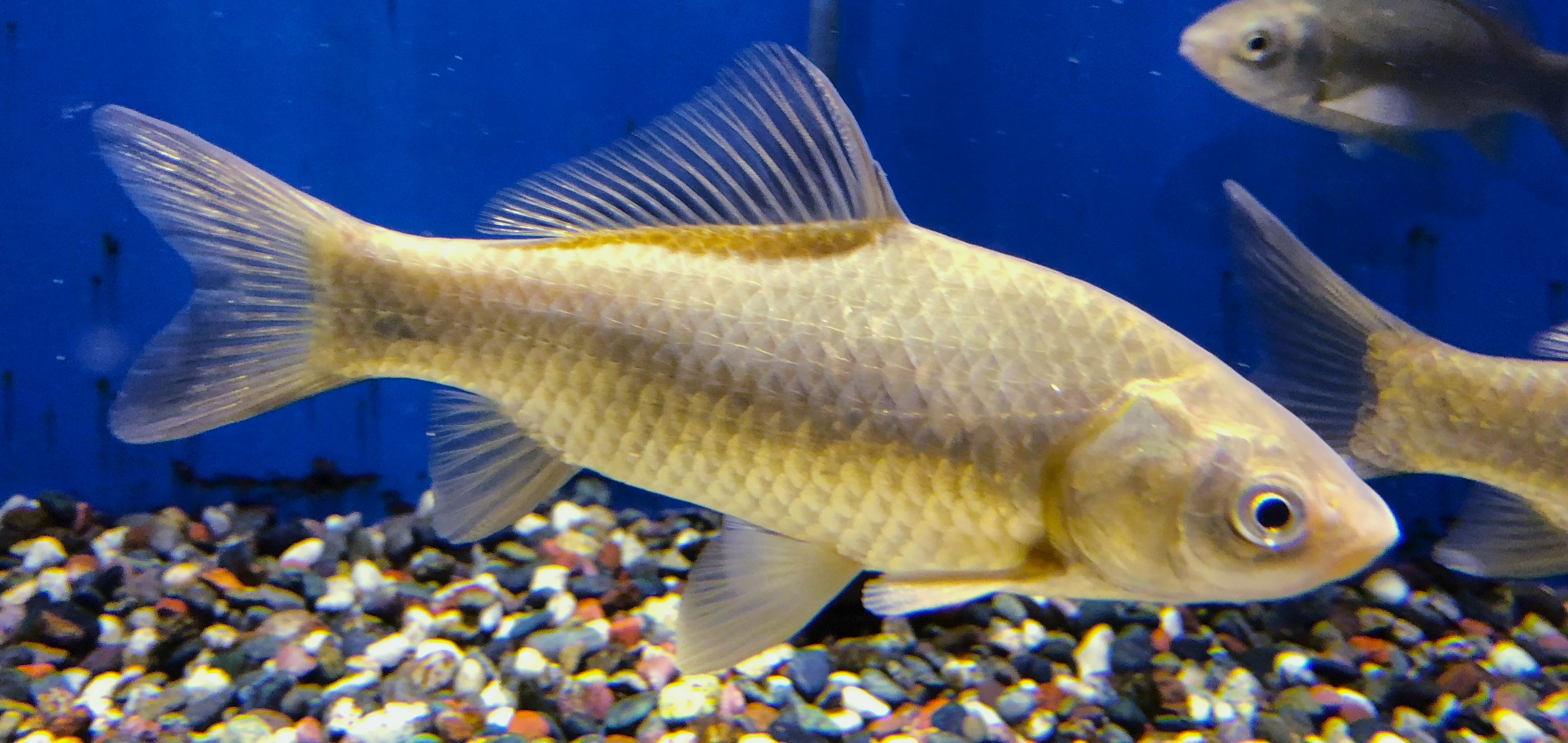
Ginbuna

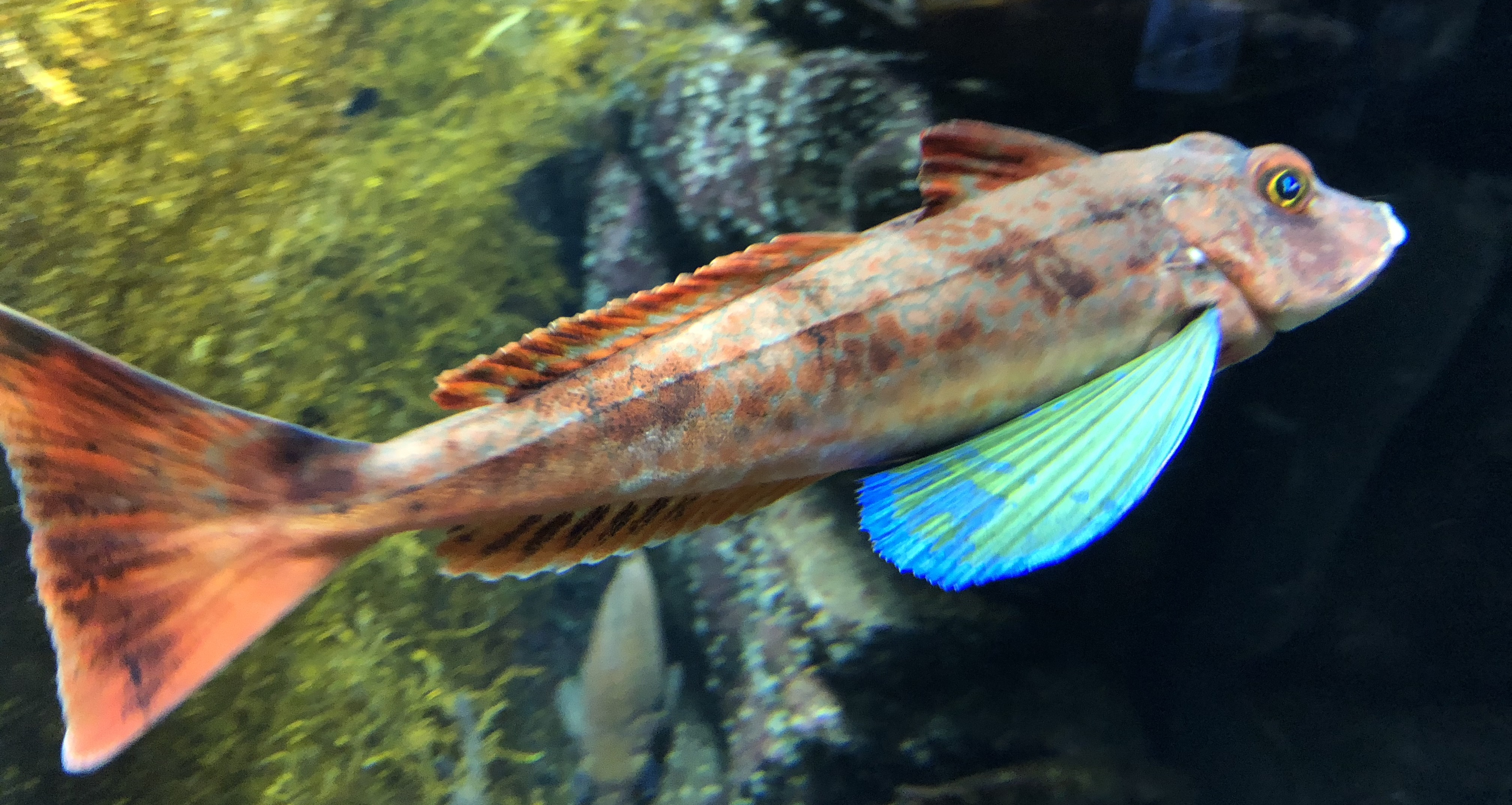
Spiny red gurnard

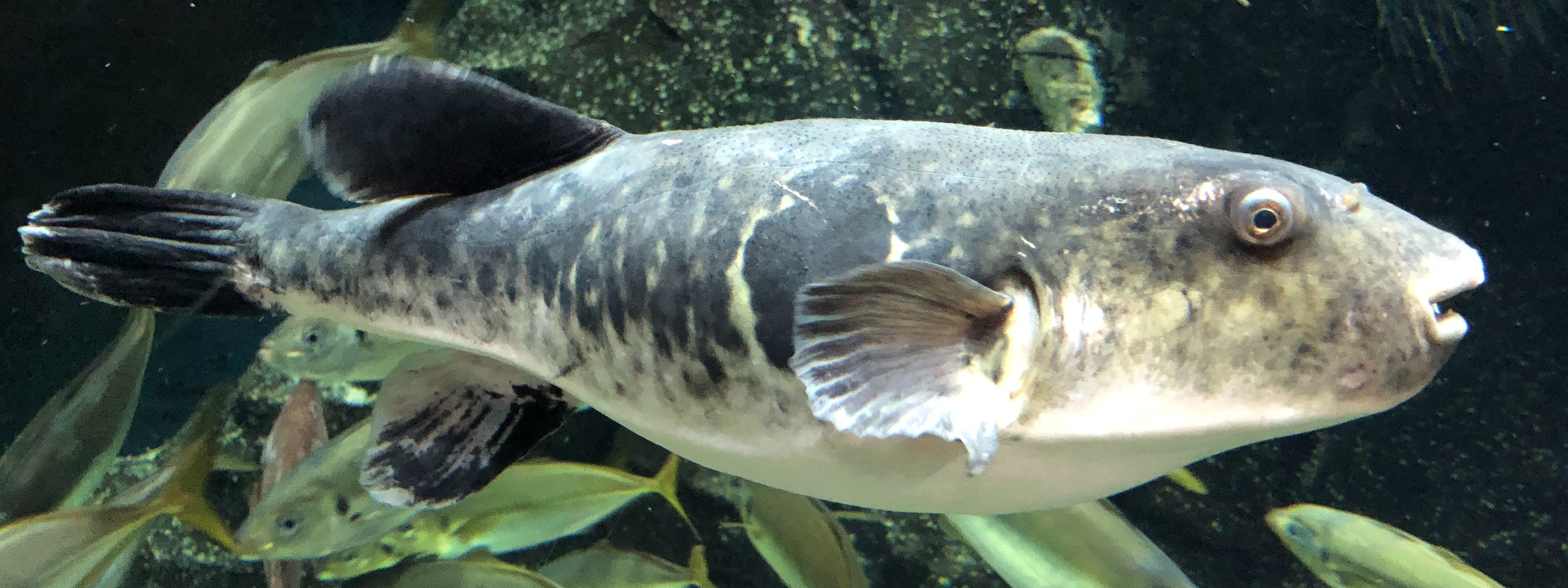
Tiger puffer

== Restaurant menu ==
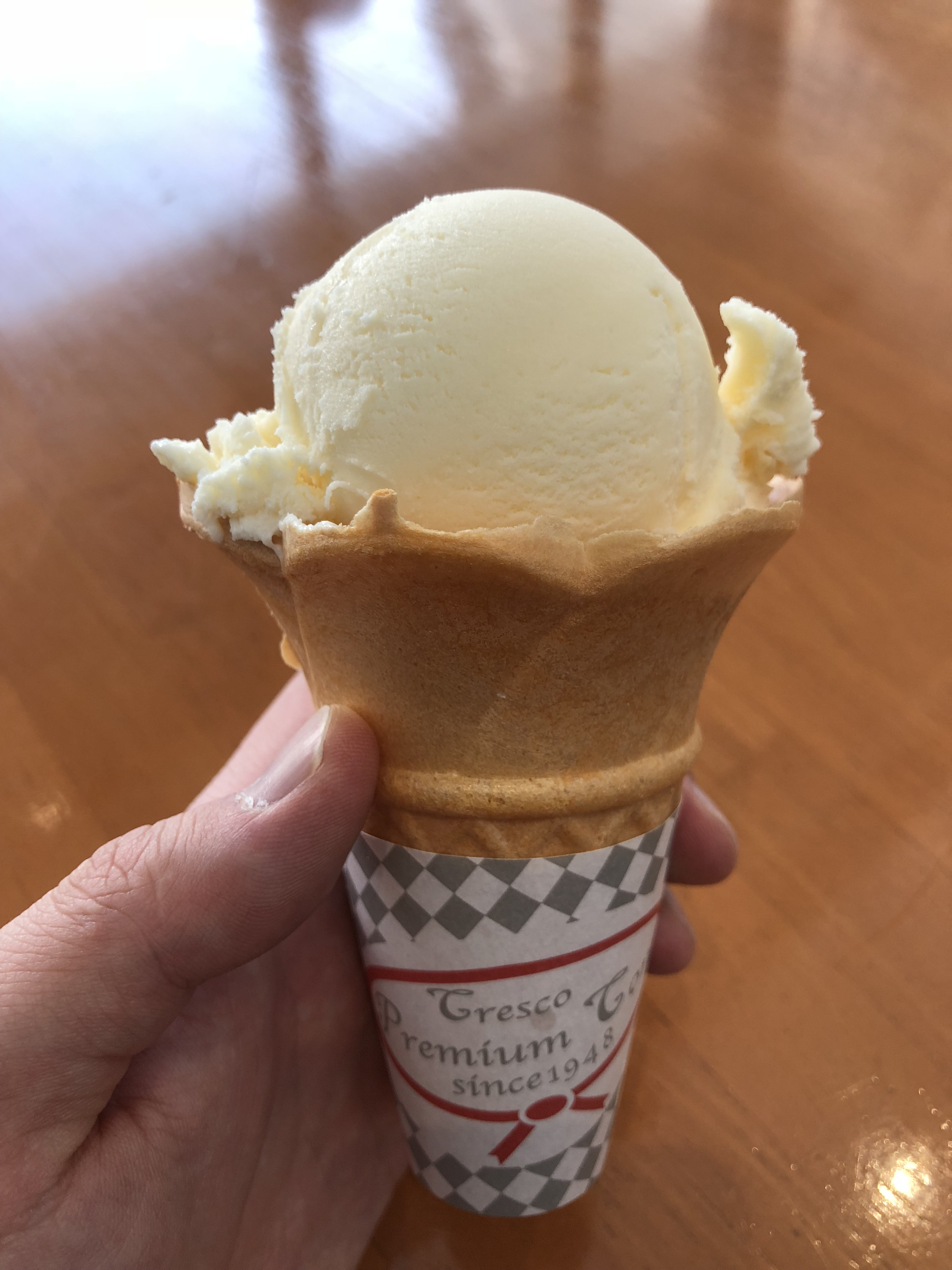
Jellyfish Ice cream

- Jellyfish ramen - Contains ground cannonball jellyfish.
- Jellyfish sashimi
- Jellyfish ice cream

== Access ==
- From JR Tsuruoka Station, 30 minutes by Shōnai Kōtsu bus bound for Yunohama Onsen, adjacent to Kamo Suizokukan stop.
