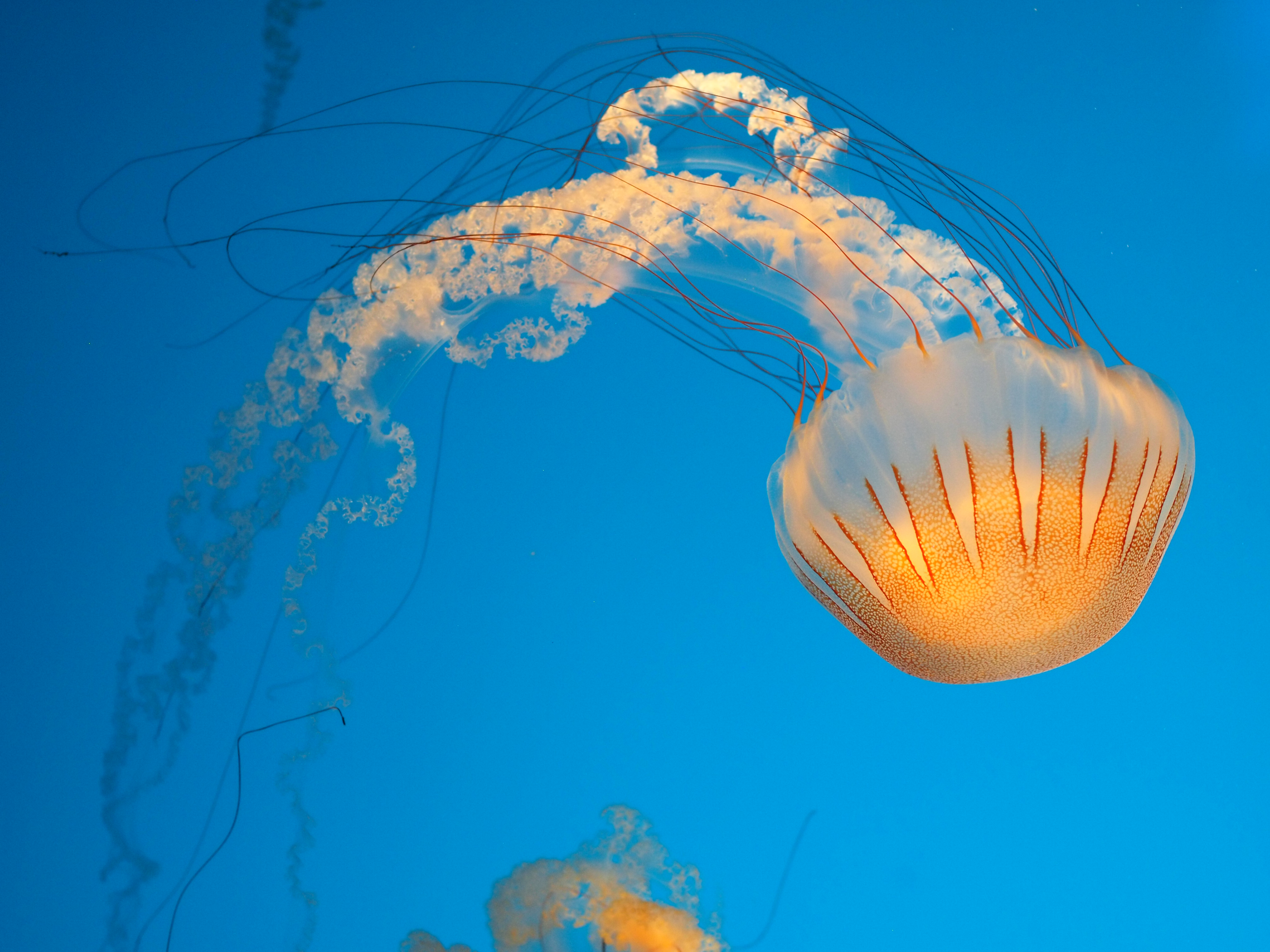
- A South American sea nettle at Monterey Bay Aquarium in 2014

Scientific classification
- Domain: Eukaryota
- Kingdom: Animalia
- Phylum: Cnidaria
- Class: Scyphozoa
- Order: Semaeostomeae
- Family: Pelagiidae
- Genus: Chrysaora
- Species: C. plocamia

Binomial name
- Chrysaora plocamia (Lesson, 1830)

= Chrysaora plocamia =

South American sea nettle

Species of jellyfish

Chrysaora plocamia, the South American sea nettle, is a species of jellyfish from the family Pelagiidae. It is found from the Pacific coast of Peru, south along Chile's coast to Tierra del Fuego, and north along the Atlantic coast of Argentina, with a few records from Uruguay. Despite its common name, it is not the only sea nettle in South America. For example, C. lactea is another type of sea nettle in this region. Historically, C. plocamia was often confused with C. hysoscella, a species now known to be restricted to the northeast Atlantic. C. plocamia is a large jellyfish, up to 1 m (3 ft 3 in) in bell diameter, although most mature individuals only are 25–40 cm (10–16 in).

== Description ==
Chrysaora plocamia, like many other sea nettles or jellyfish in the phylum Cnidaria, gets its name from its sting resembling a bee or nettle bush. The scientific name of these cnidarians comes from the son of Poseidon, Chrysaor. The specific epithet of C. plocamia is derived from the Ancient Greek plókamos, meaning "tress" or "braid of hair". The South American Sea Nettle is known for its red-brown bell, long, spiraling arms, and thin tentacles. These tentacles surround inner tentacles that are often white and fluffy in appearance. The bell can grow to a maximum of nearly 30 inches in diameter while the trailing arms can reach 12 to 15 feet in length. They feed on the common prey of other sea nettles including what they can catch and kill with their stinging nettles. C. plocamia may form a parasitic relationship with crab larvae, which use them for food and shelter. These jellyfish have increased in population in recent years, which may be caused by climate change and the ecosystems being significantly changed.

== Location ==
C. plocamia is a planktonic species, meaning that it floats and travels with the currents. This is where they have the most food and can eat the prey that they consume from the water column. They typically dwell near the ocean surface in the epipelagic zone. Blooms and strandings of Chrysaora plocamia are reported to occur along both Atlantic and Pacific South American coasts. Additionally theses nettles are 15% of all beachings, and cover an area of 13,000 km of coast line.

== Life History and Behavior ==
=== Life Stages ===
Chrysaora plocamia has a life cycle consisting of multiple phases. This species begins as fertilized eggs which are able to drift around the ocean. In C. plocamia, eggs often attach to the arms of adult specimens for safety and further development. They then develop into planula larvae, which can swim using hairs called cilia. In this stage, the larvae are searching for suitable substrate to progress to the next stage.

The benthic polyps are a non-moving stage of cnidarian life cycles. Polyps have a cylindrical body with a mouth surrounded by tentacles at one end and a basal disc which attaches the polyp to a surface on the other end. Polyps are able to catch and consume prey with these tentacles. Polyps perform the essential process of strobilation, a type of asexual reproduction.

Polyps may develop directly into medusa, which are fully developed, adult C. plocamia. Medusa are sexually mature and are pelagic, meaning they live in the open ocean. Polyps may also produce ephyrae, which are younger versions of medusa which then grow into adult specimens.

=== Reproduction ===
During their polyp stage, Scyphozoans reproduce asexually to produce ephyrae, which then develop into adults. This process is called strobilation, which is unique to cnidarians. This occurs on the seafloor, or the benthos, and this type of asexual reproduction is considered to be an important indicator for population blooms. In this species, a single polyp has been seen to produce between 3 and 10 ephyrae, and this process is completed during the course of approximately 7 to 10 days.

C. plocamia also is able to reproduce sexually. Only specimens in the medusae, or adult, stage reproduce sexually. Studies suggest that the South American Sea Nettle reproduces sexually in the same manner as closely related species, such as the Pacific Sea Nettle, C. fuscescens. Sexual reproduction occurs when female medusae catch sperm drifting through the ocean and fertilize eggs that it has released. This produces more genetically diverse offspring than asexual reproduction.

=== Diet ===
The diet of the South American Sea Nettle consists primarily of a wide variety of zooplankton. The quantity of zooplankton consumed by this species causes a substantial impact on the species in the food web, causing top-down ecological forcing, in which the predators such as C. plocamia control the populations of the prey.

=== Predation ===
Chrysaora plocamia is predated on by a range of different species. Many species of fish in the region are known to feed on C. plocamia, including the Seriolella violacea which are frequently fished for by humans using C. plocamia as bait. Also, C. plocamia is part of the diet for species of sea turtles, including the leatherback turtle (Dermochelys coriocea), the green turtle (Chelonia mydas agassizii), and the olive ridley (Lepidochelys olivacea). For the most part, the adult medusae are predated upon by these species.

=== Movement ===
Sea nettles such as the South American Sea Nettle have limited movement abilities. Because jellyfish are a type of zooplankton, they primarily drift in the ocean. However, this species has the ability to move throughout the water column using muscles in their bells. This movement is unable to resist strong currents; however, C. plocamia is adapted to be able to survive without relying on their locomotion.
