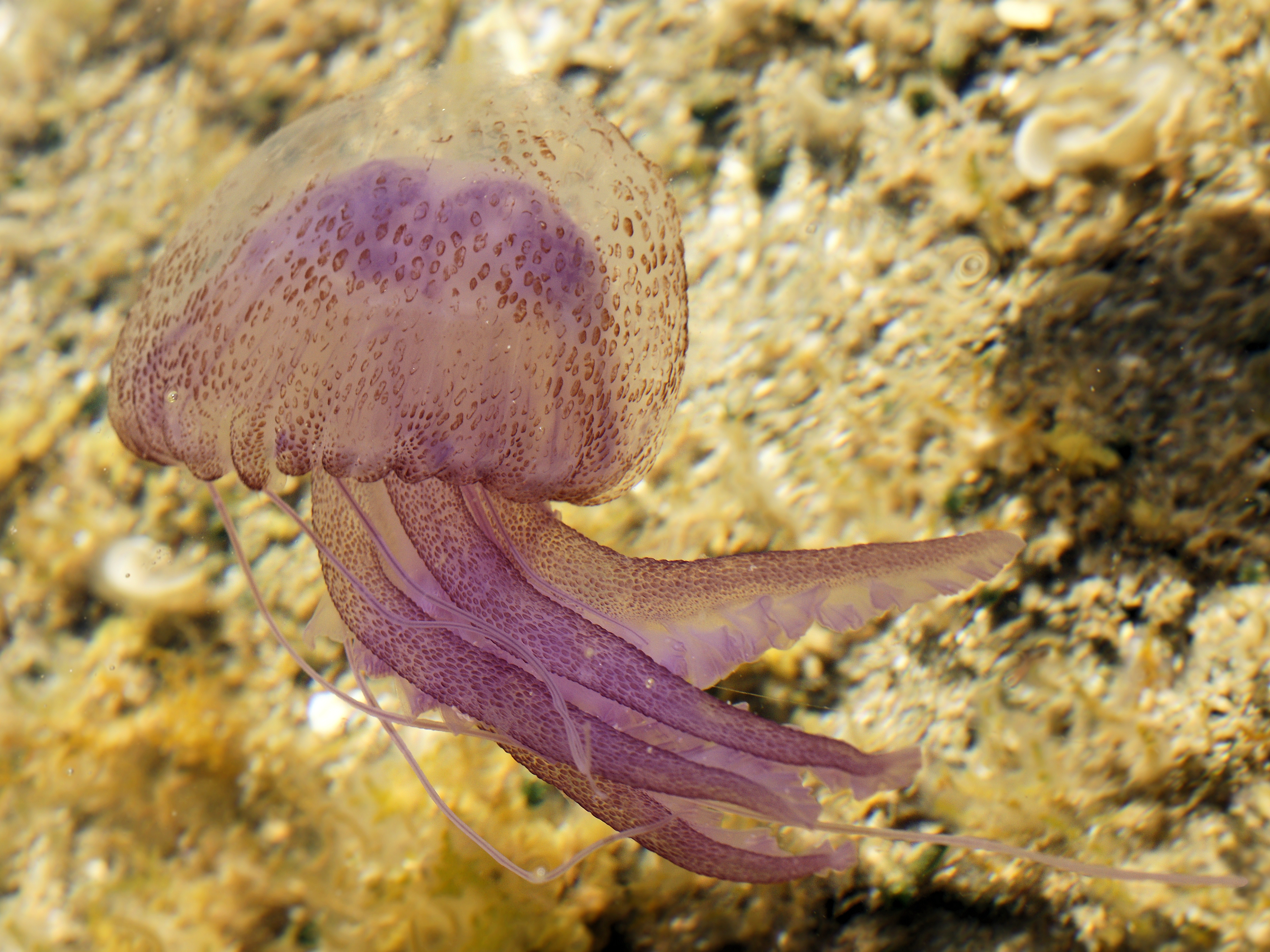

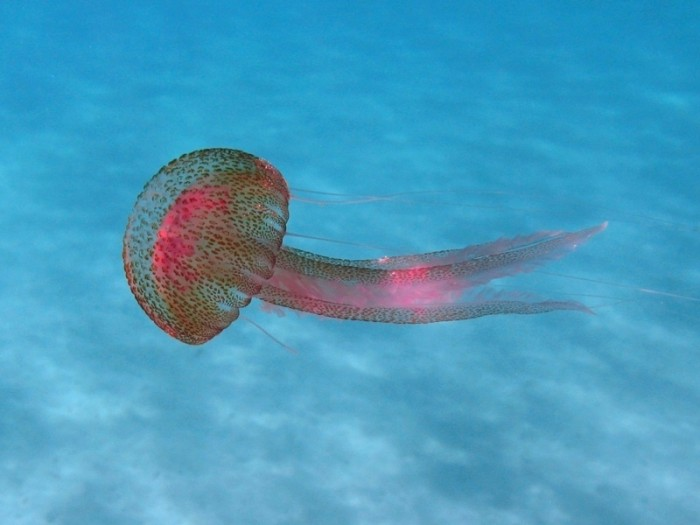
- Mediterranean individuals from Sardinia (above) and Corsica (below)

Scientific classification
- Kingdom: Animalia
- Phylum: Cnidaria
- Class: Scyphozoa
- Order: Semaeostomeae
- Family: Pelagiidae
- Genus: Pelagia; Péron & Lesueur, 1810
- Species: P. noctiluca

Binomial name
- Pelagia noctiluca (Forsskål, 1775)

Synonyms
- Medusa noctiluca Forsskål, 1775; Pelagia neglecta Vanhöffen, 1888; Pelagia parthenopensis Lesson, 1843; Pelagia perla (Slabber, 1781); Pelagia purpuroviolacea Stiasny, 1914; Pelagia rosacea Stiasny, 1914

= Pelagia noctiluca =

Species of cnidarian

Pelagia noctiluca is a jellyfish in the family Pelagiidae and the only currently recognized species in the genus Pelagia. It is typically known in English as the mauve stinger, but other common names are purple-striped jelly (causing potential confusion with Chrysaora colorata), purple stinger, purple people eater, purple jellyfish, luminous jellyfish and night-light jellyfish. In Greek, pelagia means "(she) of the sea", from pelagos "sea, open sea"; in Latin noctiluca is the combining form of nox, "night", and lux, "light"; thus, Pelagia noctiluca can be described as a marine organism with the ability to glow in the dark (bioluminescence). It is found worldwide in tropical and warm temperate seas, although it is suspected that records outside the North Atlantic region, which includes the Mediterranean and Gulf of Mexico, represent closely related but currently unrecognized species.

A fairly small and variably coloured species, both its tentacles and (unusual among jellyfish) bell are covered in stinging cells. Stinging incidents are common, painful and the symptoms may continue for a considerable time after the encounter, but they are generally not dangerous. When large numbers of this oceanic species are washed ashore, the local economy can be affected because tourists avoid the beaches and fishers are stung while trying to retrieve their nets, which can be clogged by the jellyfish. Additionally, swarms of Pelagia noctiluca have been recorded wiping out entire fish farms. Because of this, it has become one of the most studied jellyfish species.

== Distribution, habitat and taxonomy ==
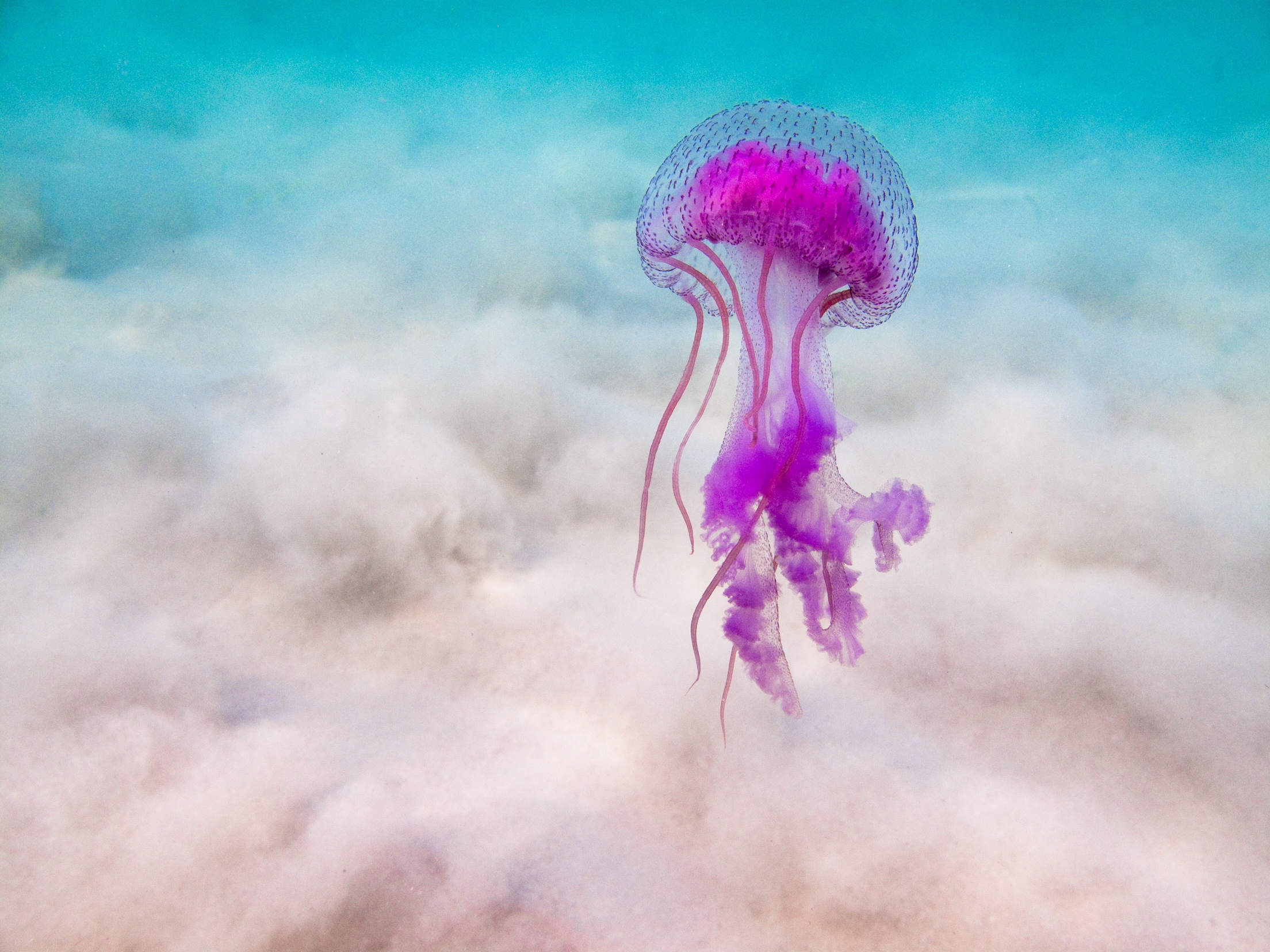
Pelagia noctiluca near Sydney, Australia

This jellyfish is best known from the North Atlantic region, ranging from 4th parallel north (just north of Equator) to the North Sea and Atlantic Canada, including the Mediterranean and Gulf of Mexico.

There are reports from most other tropical or warm temperate seas around the world, including both the Pacific and Indian Oceans, with its apparent southern limit being 42nd parallel south. Some of the locations are California (rare), Hawaii (rare), northern New Zealand and all around Australia (common). However, it is suspected that Pelagia noctiluca—as currently defined—is a species complex with records outside the North Atlantic region involving other closely related species that presently are unrecognized or undescribed. Even North Atlantic and South Atlantic populations show significant genetic differences. A comprehensive taxonomic review is necessary to resolve the situation. In 2014, a second species in the genus Pelagia was described from the Mediterranean, but two years later it was moved to its own genus as Mawia benovici.

The swimming ability of Pelagia noctiluca is limited and as a result large swarms (also known as blooms) of this oceanic species are occasionally carried by the wind or current to inshore areas, sometimes ending up stranded on beaches. This also means that the species sometimes appears in waters outside its normal temperature preference, with records as far north as the Shetland Islands and the Norwegian deep. It generally occurs at water temperatures between 10 and 27 °C (50–81 °F), but below 11 °C (52 °F) it stops pulsating. It mostly ranges from the surface to a depth of 150 m (490 ft), but has been recorded to 1,400 m (4,600 ft). Pelagia noctiluca partakes in the diel vertical migration, occurring near the surface at night and deeper during the day.

Local populations fluctuate greatly and the species may go virtually unrecorded in a region for years, only to suddenly reappear in huge swarms. On occasion, a swarm may cover tens of square kilometers, include millions of Pelagia noctiluca, and reach densities of more than 500 individuals per m^{3} (14 per ft^{3}).

== Description ==
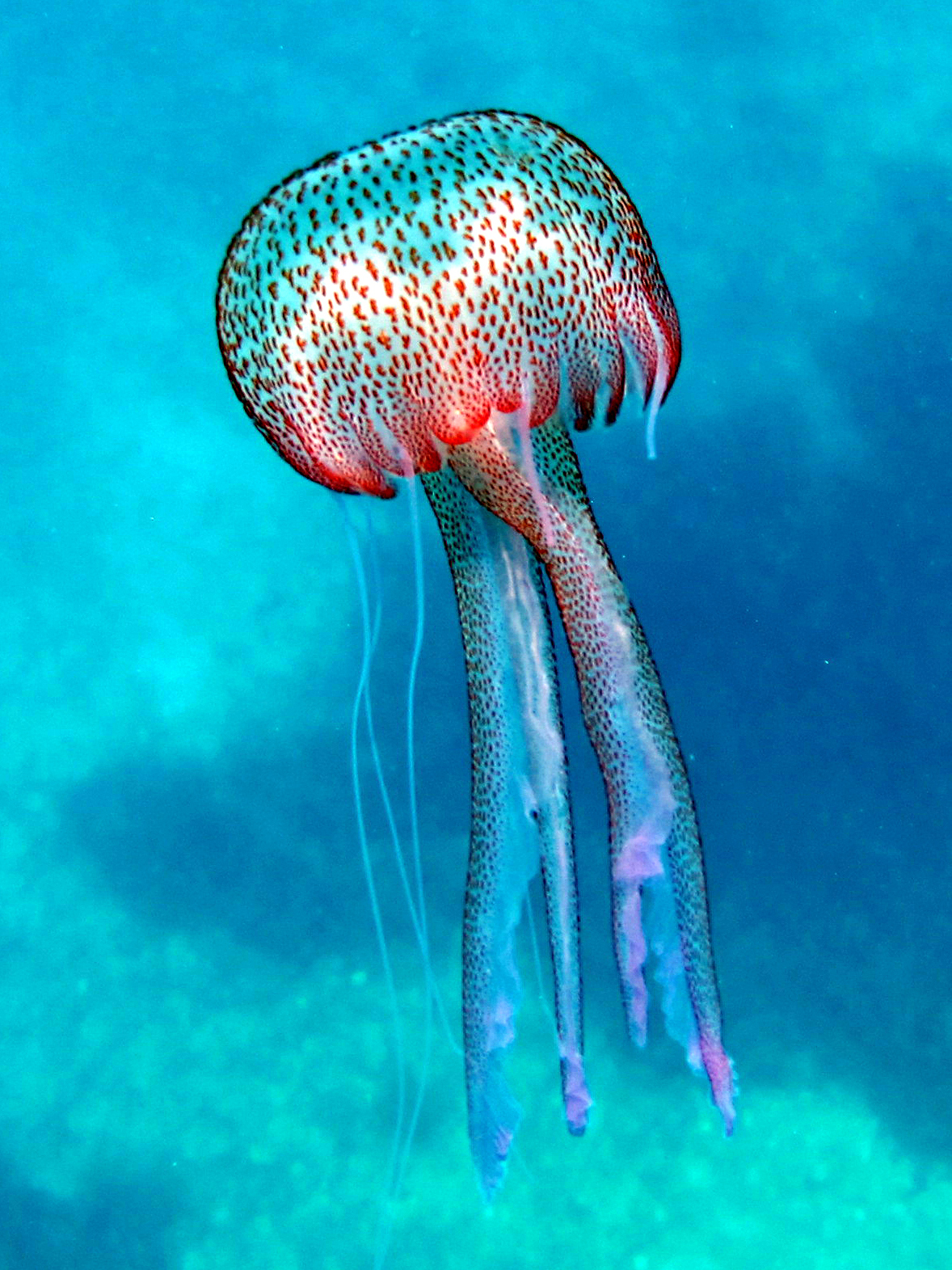
Pelagia noctiluca at Elba in the Mediterranean

Pelagia noctiluca are fairly small jellyfish with adults having a bell diameter of 3–12 cm (1.2–4.7 in). Their colour is variable, ranging from mauve, purple, pink, light brown to yellow. The body is radially symmetrical. There is only one body cavity known as the gastrovascular cavity. This is a primitive gut or digestive cavity with only one opening that is used for ingestion and excretion; there are four long oral arms with crenulated margins that are the primary feeding surface. Each P. noctiluca medusa has eight long tentacles that emerge from the umbrella margin. Being radially symmetrical it has no head and thus no centralized nervous system. The nervous system present is primitive, consisting of a simple net composed of naked and largely non-polar neurons. In addition P. noctiluca also lacks a gaseous exchange, excretory and circulatory system. However cnidaria have evolved cnidae, cells which serve for a variety of functions that include prey capture, defense, locomotion and attachment. When fully formed cnidae are called cnidocytes. When stimulated the cnidae secrete nematocyst toxins that are biological poisons.

These organisms have a well-developed manubrium, a proboscis-like structure bearing the mouth and four long oral arms. Also the mesoglea, or jelly, is relatively thickened and well developed in this species. Sense organs, known as rhopalia in the scyphomedusae, are located around the umbrella margin in notches and alternate between tentacles. Cnidae are present in the epidermis and gastrodermis of the umbrella, as well as on the tentacles.

Pelagia noctiluca has eight marginal tentacles alternating with eight marginal sense organs. Four gonads arise as elongated endodermal proliferations, developing into ribbon-like folds in the interradial sectors of the stomach wall slightly distal to the rows of gastric filaments. Male and female gonads vary only slightly and the main difference is the thickness of the follicle.

=== Bioluminescence ===
Pelagia noctiluca are bioluminescent, i.e. have an ability to produce a low light that is visible to humans during the night. Light is emitted in the form of flashes when the medusa is stimulated by turbulence created by waves or by a ship's motion. This flashing is only of relatively short duration and gradually fades. A very early description of bioluminescence was provided by Pliny the Elder in Historia Naturalis (77 AD), using the name "pulmo marinus", and now considered to refer to P. noctiluca.

== Behavior ==
=== Life cycle and reproduction ===
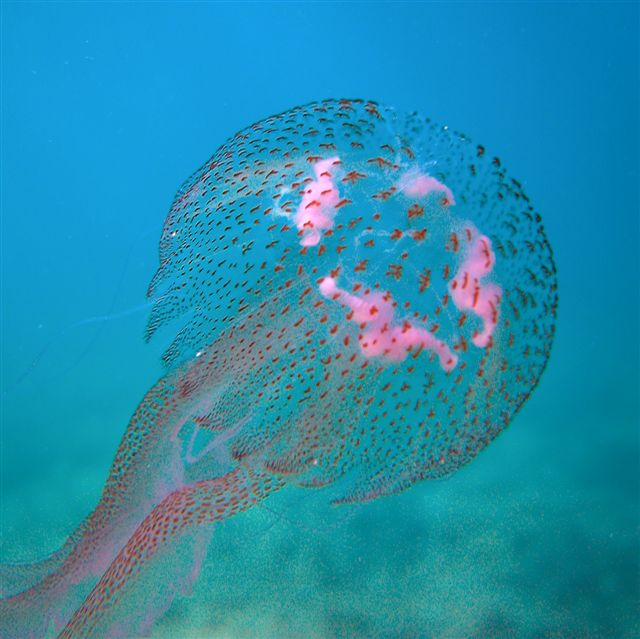
Pelagia noctiluca in the medusa (adult) stage near Sicily in the Mediterranean Sea

Pelagia noctiluca is adapted to a pelagic, open-sea mode of life. Whereas most jellyfish, including the other species in the family Pelagiidae, have a life cycle with both the free-swimming stages (planula, ephyra and medusa) and a bottom-living polyp stage, P. noctiluca has adapted in such a way that the polyp stage is absent. P. noctiluca reproduces sexually with the male and female spawning respectively sperm and eggs into the sea during daylight hours. After 3 days, the fertilized egg develops into a planula; at this stage movement is only done by ciliary action. After a week, planulae develop into tiny ephyrae and a month later they develop into (male or female) medusae. There is little or no ephyra growth at temperatures below 10 °C (50 °F), and fewer survive below 8 °C (46 °F). Ephyrae stages reside in the upper mixed layer above the shallow thermocline. The bottom-living polyp stage of most other jellyfish species is in between the planula and ephyra stages. Initially, the medusa of P. noctiluca only has a bell diameter of about 1 cm (0.4 in). Some already reach maturity at 3.5 cm (1.4 in) in bell diameter and at 6 cm (2.4 in) all are mature. In the Mediterranean Sea, P. noctiluca appear to mostly spawn between the late summer and early winter, but also at lower levels in the spring to early summer. Scientists have found that the abundance and distribution of early life stages of P. noctiluca are related to sea surface chlorophyll concentration. P. noctiluca rely on favorable trophic conditions to spawn, so when their criteria is not met, the medusae will stop reproducing immediately and lose weight when presented with an inadequate amount of food. Large swarms of adults at the ocean surface in certain times of the year possibly are spawning aggregations. This jellyfish typically lives for about 9 months.

=== Feeding ===
Two ephyrae of Pelagia noctiluca competing for eggs of the Atlantic bluefin tuna

Pelagia noctiluca are opportunistic and have been recorded feeding on a wide range of small organisms like planktonic crustaceans (cladocerans, copepods, ostracods and crustacean larvae), mollusk larvae, larvaceans, hydromedusae, siphonophorans, arrow worms, fish eggs and fish larvae, as well as detritus suspended in the open water and microscopic phytoplankton. The phytoplankton can be consumed either directly or indirectly by eating herbivorous crustaceans with stomachs filled with it. The ability to eat phytoplankton is—as far as known—highly unusual among cnidarians. P. noctiluca will eat small warty comb jellies (Mnemiopsis leidyi), potentially helping to control this invasive species. Cannibalism where adults consume young of their own species is also common in P. noctiluca. The stomach contents of P. noctiluca also vary throughout the seasons. Copepods tend to be their largest food source all year round, but fish eggs and pteropods are a close second. During the spring months, P. noctiluca mainly prey on copepods and fish eggs, while pteropods are preyed on more during December and May. The variability in this species' diet suggests that they are generalists, and do not have strong prey selectivity.

Feeding reactions were studied by Bozler (1926), where a piece of food was given to the marginal tentacle, the tentacle contracted quickly. There was a slow contraction of the coronal muscle which brought the tentacle nearer to the mouth. The food was grasped by the lip of one of the oral arm and transported slowly along until it reached the stomach. They were found to feed on the salp Thalia democratica; however, they are found mainly to feed by taking food particle by the amoeboid process of the endoderm cells, thus being suspension feeders.

== Sting ==
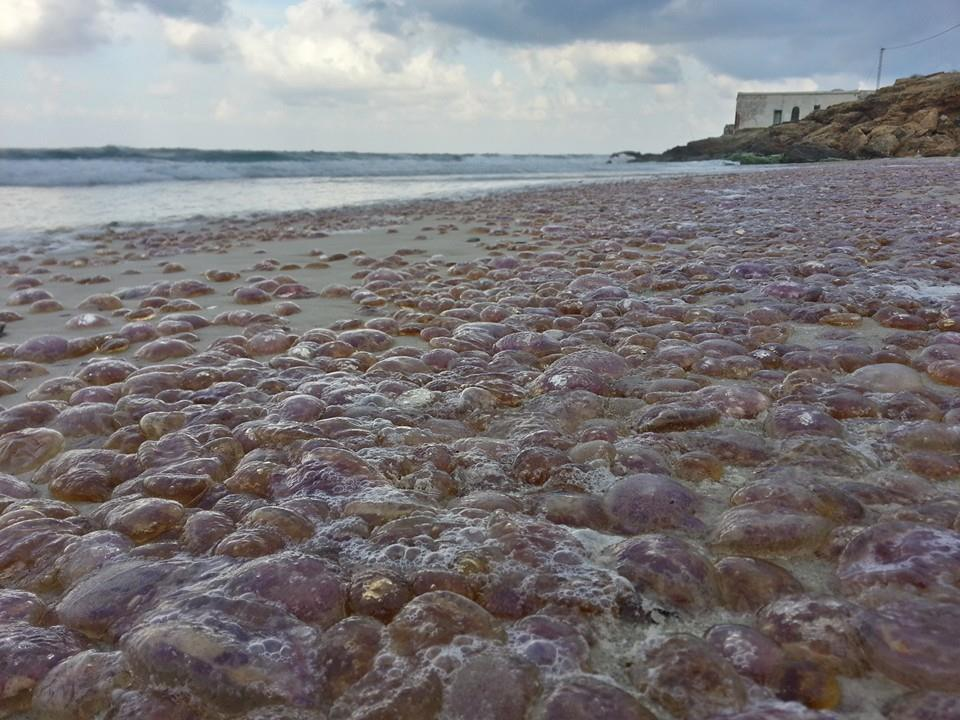
Pelagia noctiluca may strand in large numbers, as shown on this beach in Tunisia

Pelagia noctiluca is considered the most important stinging jellyfish in the Mediterranean Sea. Both its tentacles and—unusual among jellyfish—the bell are covered in cnidocytes (stinging cells), and even recently dead, stranded individuals can sting. P. noctiluca contains four different types of nematocysts, but two are important for stinging, O-isorhiza and eurytele. The sting causes pain that typically lasts 1–2 weeks, local redness, swelling and a rash, but it is generally not dangerous and there are no known fatalities. On occasion, symptoms may be more general and include dizziness, vomiting and diarrhea. Sudden recurrent skin eruptions may occur years later. Rarely, the sting can cause a serious allergic reaction and leave scars or hyperpigmented marks on the skin that can remain for years after the encounter. If stung by P. noctiluca there can be cross-reactivity (an allergic reaction) if later stung by Portuguese man o' war (Physalia physalis) or sea nettles (Chrysaora). There is one known case where a sting by P. noctiluca caused Guillain–Barré syndrome, but all symptoms disappeared within 6 months. Peculiarly, there is a record of a seven-arm octopus "borrowing" the stinging capability of a P. noctiluca. The open-sea octopus grabbed and positioned the jellyfish in such a way that it provided a defense. The sting of P. noctiluca can possibly be relieved with the use of Hydroxyacetophenone and Symsitive® since they are nematocyst inhibitor compounds, meaning they inhibit the discharge of cnidocysts.
