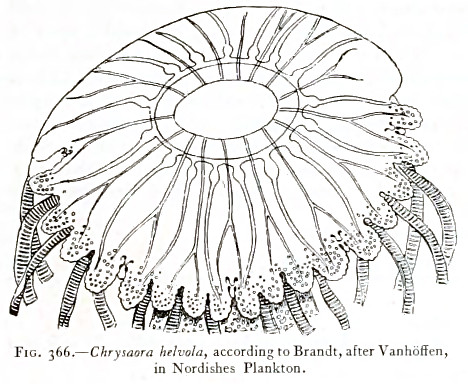

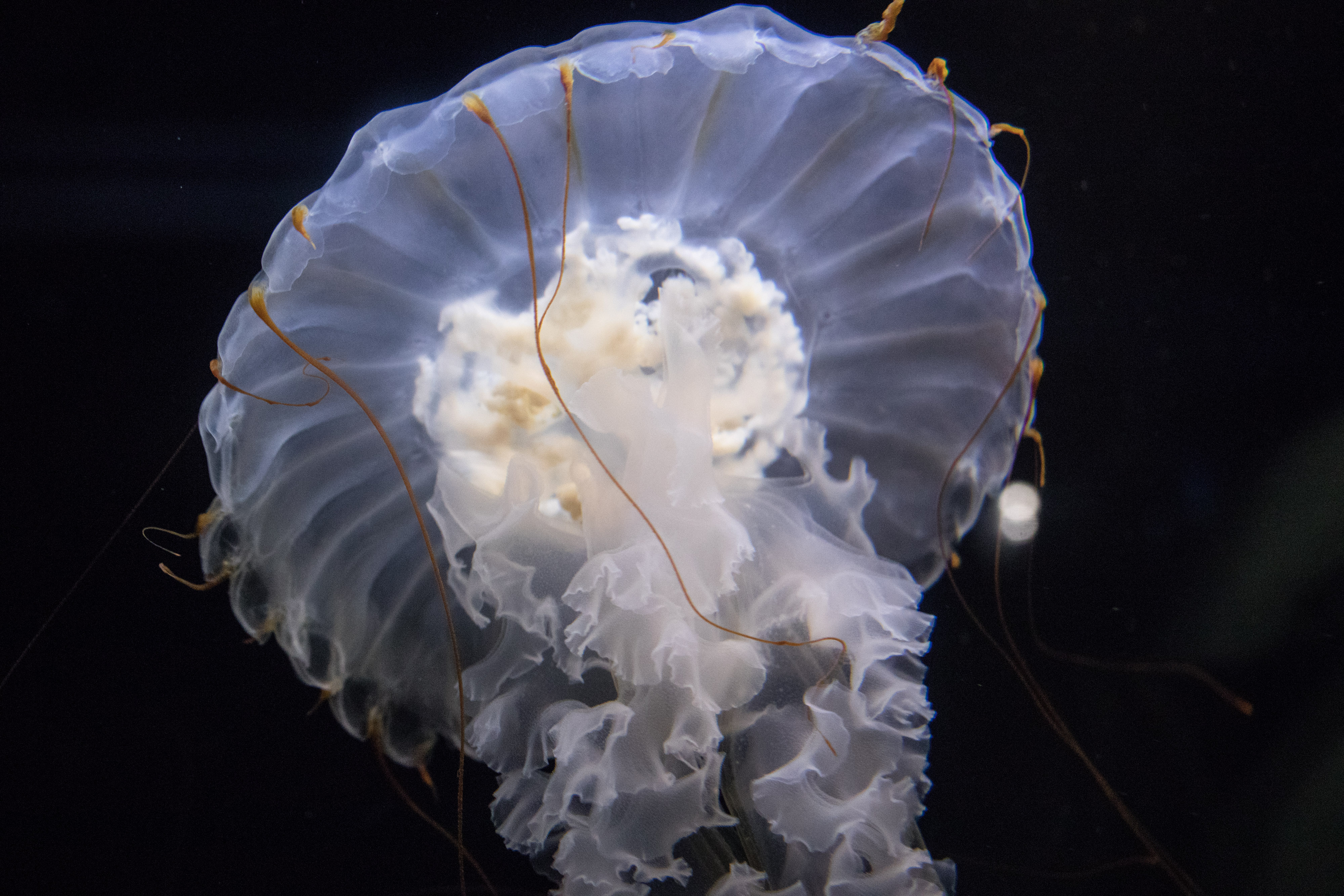

Scientific classification
- Kingdom: Animalia
- Phylum: Cnidaria
- Class: Scyphozoa
- Order: Semaeostomeae
- Family: Pelagiidae
- Genus: Chrysaora
- Species: C. helvola

Binomial name
- Chrysaora helvola (Brandt, 1838)

= Chrysaora helvola =

Species of jellyfish

Chrysaora helvola is a jellyfish in the family Pelagiidae. Although still recognized as a valid species by the World Register of Marine Species, its taxonomic history is confusing and recent reviews of the genus have not recognized it.

== Taxonomy ==
C. fuscescens was described in 1835 by Johann Friedrich von Brandt and three years later he described C. helvola (a name he preferred), noting that C. fuscescens was its synonym. This is contrary to the ICZN Code, which states that the oldest name must be used (the younger becomes a junior synonym), but Brandt's publications resulted in confusion and it was only in the 1980s that C. fuscescens again was recognized as a valid species. Nevertheless, the long history of the name C. helvola means that it still appears, although recent reviews of the genus have not recognized it.

A secondary taxonomic problem related to C. chinensis of the central Indo-Pacific, which formerly was listed as a synonym of C. helvola.
