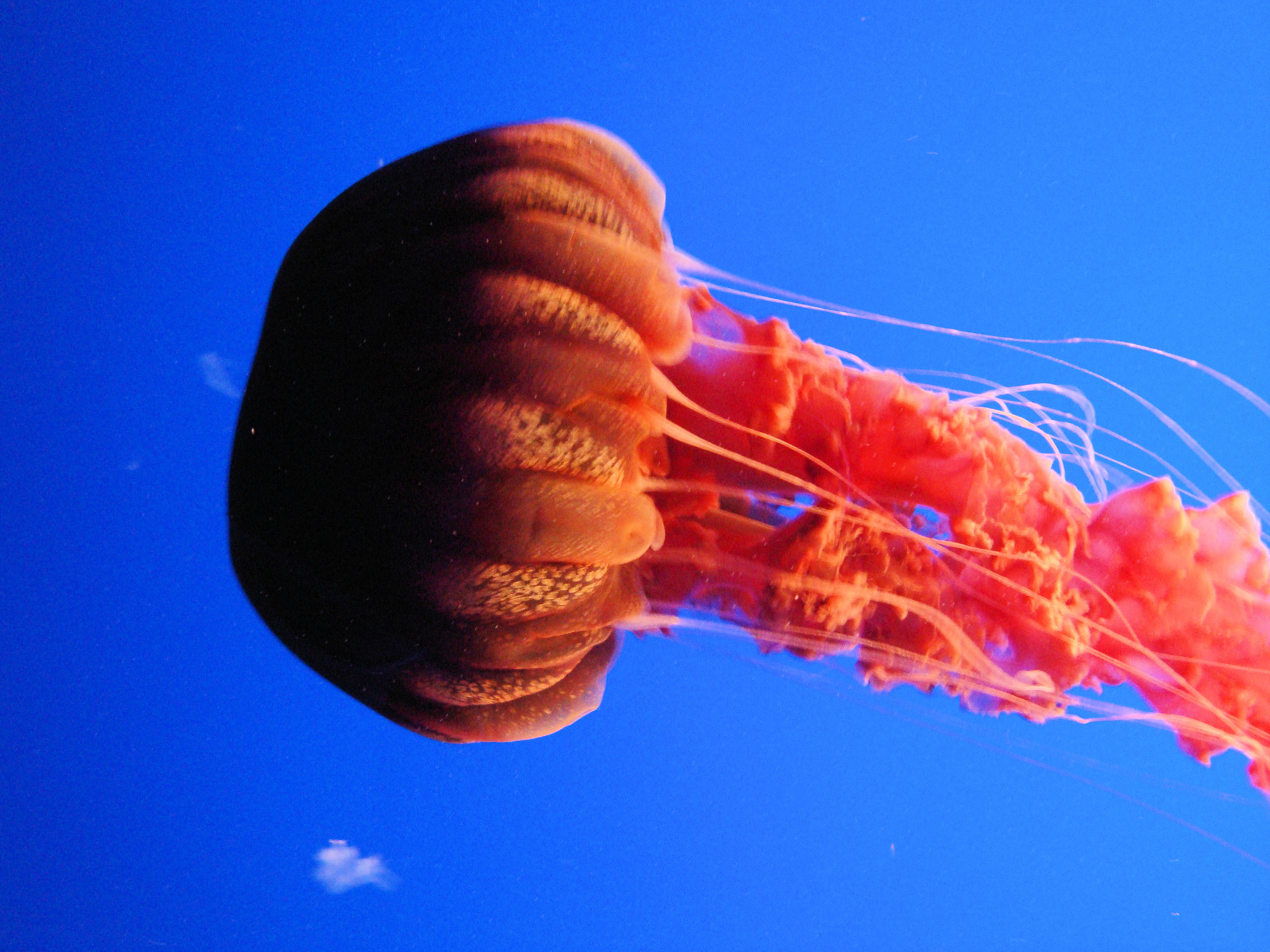

Scientific classification
- Kingdom: Animalia
- Phylum: Cnidaria
- Class: Scyphozoa
- Order: Semaeostomeae
- Family: Pelagiidae
- Genus: Chrysaora
- Species: C. achlyos

Binomial name
- Chrysaora achlyos Martin, Gershwin, Burnett, Cargo, and Bloom 1997

= Chrysaora achlyos =

Black sea nettle

Species of jellyfish

Chrysaora achlyos, the black sea nettle, sometimes informally known as the black jellyfish, is a species of jellyfish that can be found in the waters of the Pacific Ocean off North America. Its range is thought to be from Monterey Bay in the north, down to southern Baja California and Mexico, though there are reports of sightings as far north as British Columbia. The initial acknowledgment of the species occurred in 1997, after large groups were found on the Pacific coast.

== Etymology ==
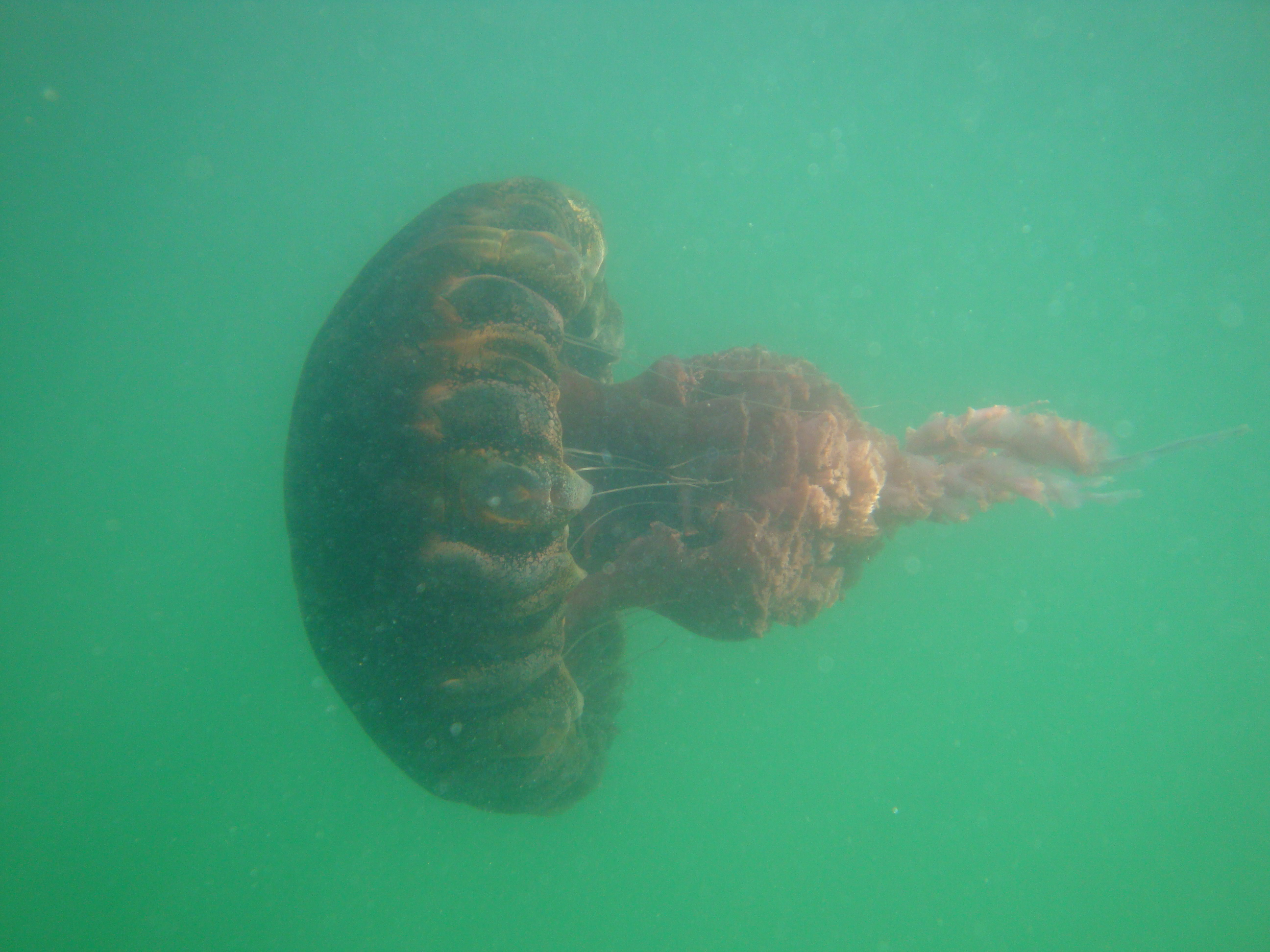
Black sea nettle in San Diego Bay

A black sea nettle swimming in a tank at Monterey Bay Aquarium.

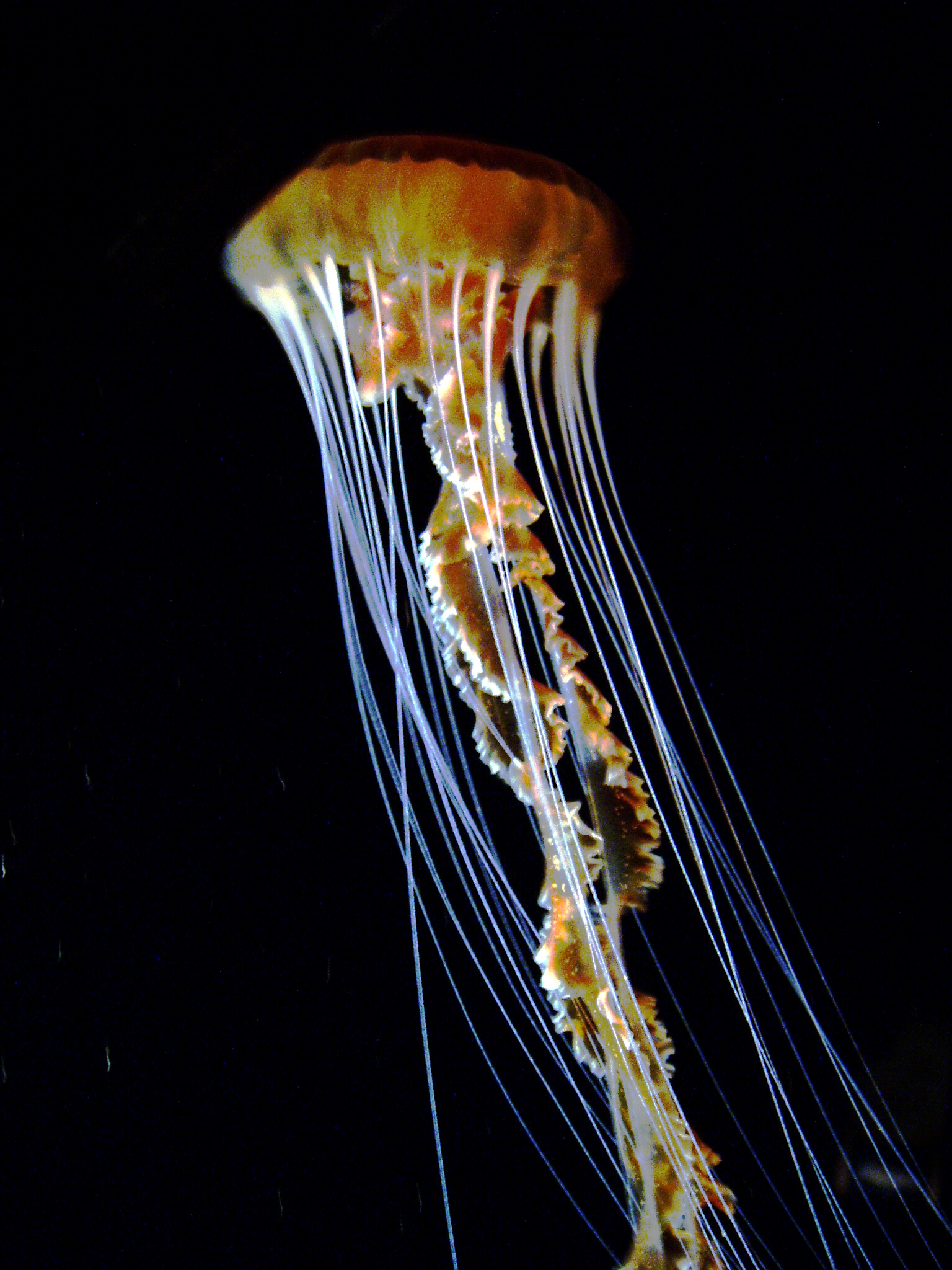

The generic name, Chrysaora, is derived from Chrysaor, the brother of Pegasus in Greek mythology. Translated literally, Chrysaor means "he who has a golden sword". The specific epithet, achylos, is constructed from the Greek achlys or akhlús (ἀχλύς), meaning "mist, darkness, and obscurity", in reference to both the species' coloration and the rarity of its sightings.

== Description ==
The black sea nettle can be quite massive, with a bell diameter potentially up to 1 metre (3 ft) and oral arms extending to 5 or 6 metres (16 or 20 ft). The bell color is a distinctive opaque dark purple to nearly black, with the margin having a lighter brown reticulated pattern. No other West Coast jelly that visits nearshore waters has this dark pigmentation. Four gonads are attached to finger-like projections that extend through subumbrellar openings (the ostia). Marginal sense organs are spaced around the bell margin after every set of 3 tentacles, for a total of 8.

Black sea nettles are occasionally seen in large numbers in surface waters off the coast of Baja California and southern California. Large swarms have occurred most recently in 1989 and 1999. During most years their whereabouts are unknown. Despite the distinctive nature of this species and its abundance when present, it was only recently officially described and is actually the largest invertebrate to have been described in the 20th century.

While sightings have been rare, when they are seen it is often as part of a massive swarm of the creatures, such as those that occurred in surface waters off the coast of Baja California and southern California in 1989, 1999 & 2010. These sightings seem to coincide with incidents of red tides, which consist of the zooplankton that black sea nettles feed upon.

== Feeding habits ==
Black sea nettles are carnivorous. Their mouth is located at the center of one end of the body, which opens to a gastrovascular cavity that is used for digestion. It has tentacles that surround the mouth to capture food. Nettles have no excretory or respiratory organs. They generally feed on zooplankton and other jellyfish. Nettles immobilize and obtain their prey using their stinging tentacles.

== Defense mechanisms ==
Each nettle tentacle is coated with thousands of microscopic nematocysts; in turn, every individual nematocyst has a "trigger" (cnidocil) paired with a capsule containing a coiled stinging filament. Upon contact, the cnidocil will immediately initiate a process that ejects the venom-coated filament from its capsule and into the target. This will inject toxins capable of killing smaller prey or stunning perceived predators. On humans, this will most likely cause a nonlethal, but painful stinging sensation that can last for forty minutes. In addition, the black sea nettle's stomach is lined with a fibrous network of vessels that attach themselves to a swallowed victim and darkmaws for quick digestion or breaking apart large prey, though the maws will close when exposed to bright lights, hence their name.
