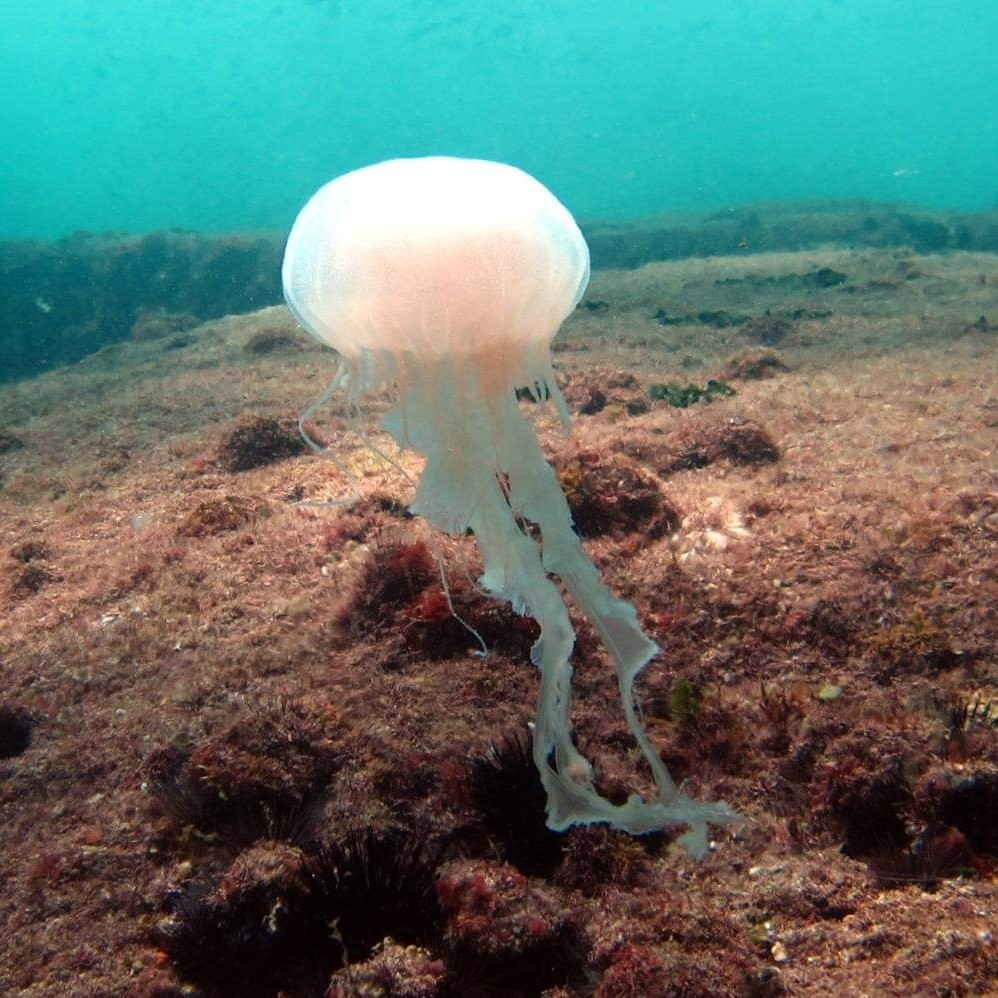

Scientific classification
- Kingdom: Animalia
- Phylum: Cnidaria
- Class: Scyphozoa
- Order: Semaeostomeae
- Family: Pelagiidae
- Genus: Chrysaora
- Species: C. lactea

Binomial name
- Chrysaora lactea Eschscholtz, 1829

= Chrysaora lactea =

Species of jellyfish

Chrysaora lactea or the Milk Sea Nettle is a species of sea nettle in the family Pelagiidae. This jellyfish has a bell diameter of up to 25 cm (10 in), and it is native to the Atlantic coast of South America. They are mainly found near the coast of Brazil, and are commonly discovered near the coast of neighboring countries such as Argentina and Cuba. It has also been reported from the Caribbean region, but genetic studies indicate that this population is closer to C. chesapeakei. A comprehensive taxonomic review is necessary to resolve this matter.

As they are found near the coast, they play a negative affect on the human lifestyle prevalent there. Large groups of C. Lactea are known as blooms and can harm tourism due to their sting and effect on local marine life.
