= Chrysaora pentastoma =

Scientific classification
- Kingdom: Animalia
- Phylum: Cnidaria
- Class: Scyphozoa
- Order: Semaeostomeae
- Family: Pelagiidae
- Genus: Chrysaora
- Species: C. pentastoma

Binomial name
- Chrysaora pentastoma (Péron & Lesueur, 1810)

Synonyms
- Chrysaora southcotti Gershwin & Zeidler 2008

Species of jellyfish

Chrysaora pentastoma or Australian Sea Nettle is a species of jellyfish from the family Pelagiidae. This small sea nettle has a strong sting and it is found in coastal waters of eastern South Australia.

== Taxonomy ==
C. pentastoma was described in 1810. Its original description is limited and in 2008 it was argued that it is insufficient for recognizing it, making the name a nomen dubium. Instead the authors described three Southern Australian species in 2008: C. kynthia, C. southcotti and C. wurlerra. In 2010, this was disputed in a review of all Chrysaora species, which noted that C. pentastoma has a unique colour pattern that is described in its original description from 1810 and this is sufficient for recognizing it, making C. southcotti its junior synonym. C. kynthia from southwestern Australia and C. wurlerra from New South Wales were described in 2008 based mainly on colour, their tentacles and details of their gonad shape, but these can be variable in Chrysaora. As a result, they were tentatively considered as nomina dubia in 2010 (however, Chrysaora of southwestern Australia and New South Wales were not assigned to other species). This view, with C. pentastoma as the only currently recognized species in Australia, is followed by the World Register of Marine Species.
