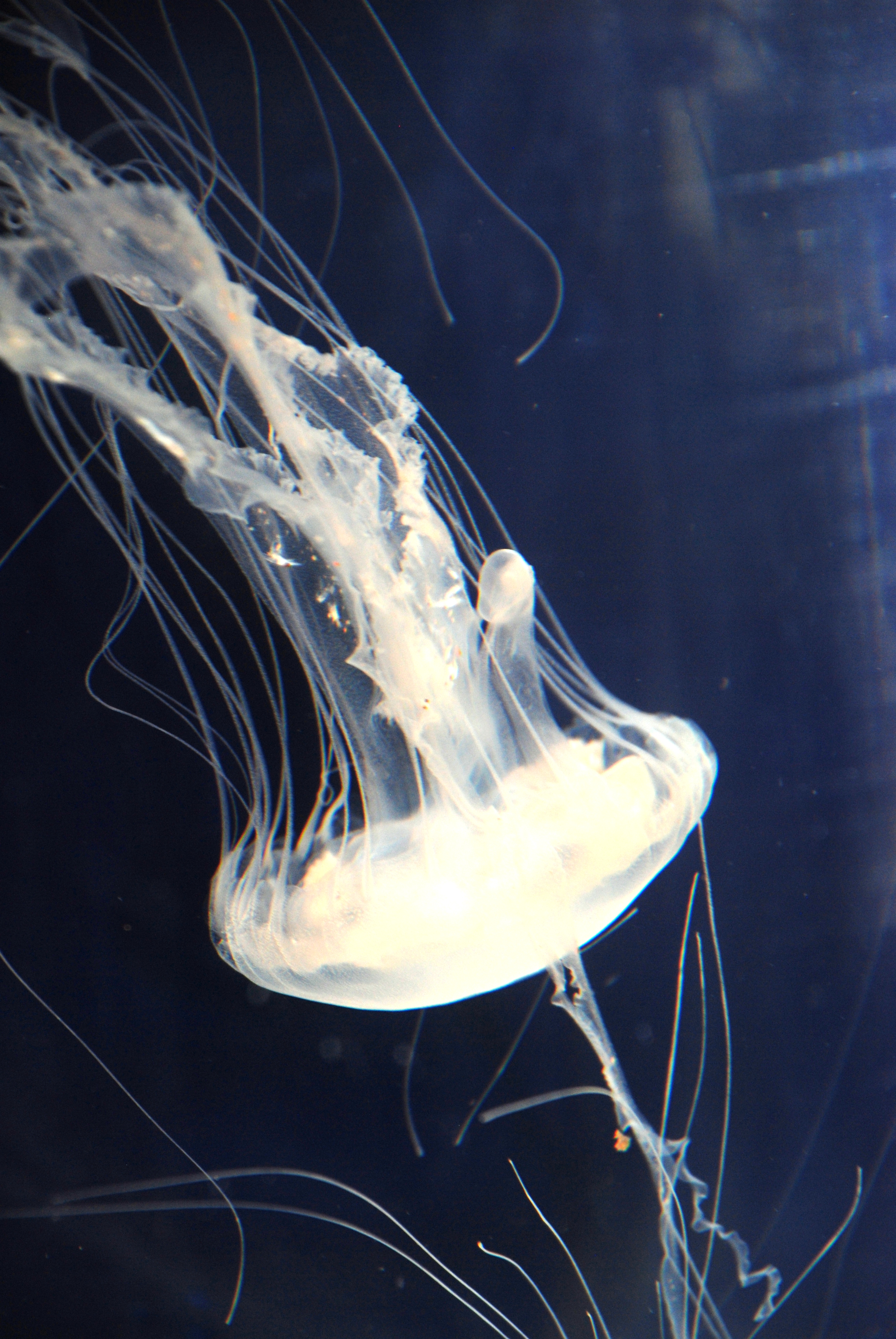

Scientific classification
- Kingdom: Animalia
- Phylum: Cnidaria
- Class: Scyphozoa
- Order: Semaeostomeae
- Family: Pelagiidae
- Genus: Chrysaora
- Species: C. quinquecirrha

Binomial name
- Chrysaora quinquecirrha (Desor, 1848)

Synonyms
- Dactylometra quinquecirrha Agassiz, 1862

= Chrysaora quinquecirrha =

Atlantic sea nettle

Species of jellyfish

Atlantic sea nettle (Chrysaora quinquecirrha) swimming at the Monterey Bay Aquarium

The Atlantic sea nettle (Chrysaora quinquecirrha), also called the East Coast sea nettle in the United States, is a species of jellyfish that inhabits the Atlantic coast of the United States. Historically it was confused with several Chrysaora species, resulting in incorrect reports of C. quinquecirrha from other parts of the Atlantic and other oceans. Most recently, C. chesapeakei of estuaries on the Atlantic coast of the United States, as well as the Gulf of Mexico, was only fully recognized as separate from C. quinquecirrha in 2017. It is smaller than the Pacific sea nettle, and has more variable coloration, but is typically pale, pinkish or yellowish, often with radiating more deeply colored stripes on the exumbrella, especially near the margin.

== Description ==
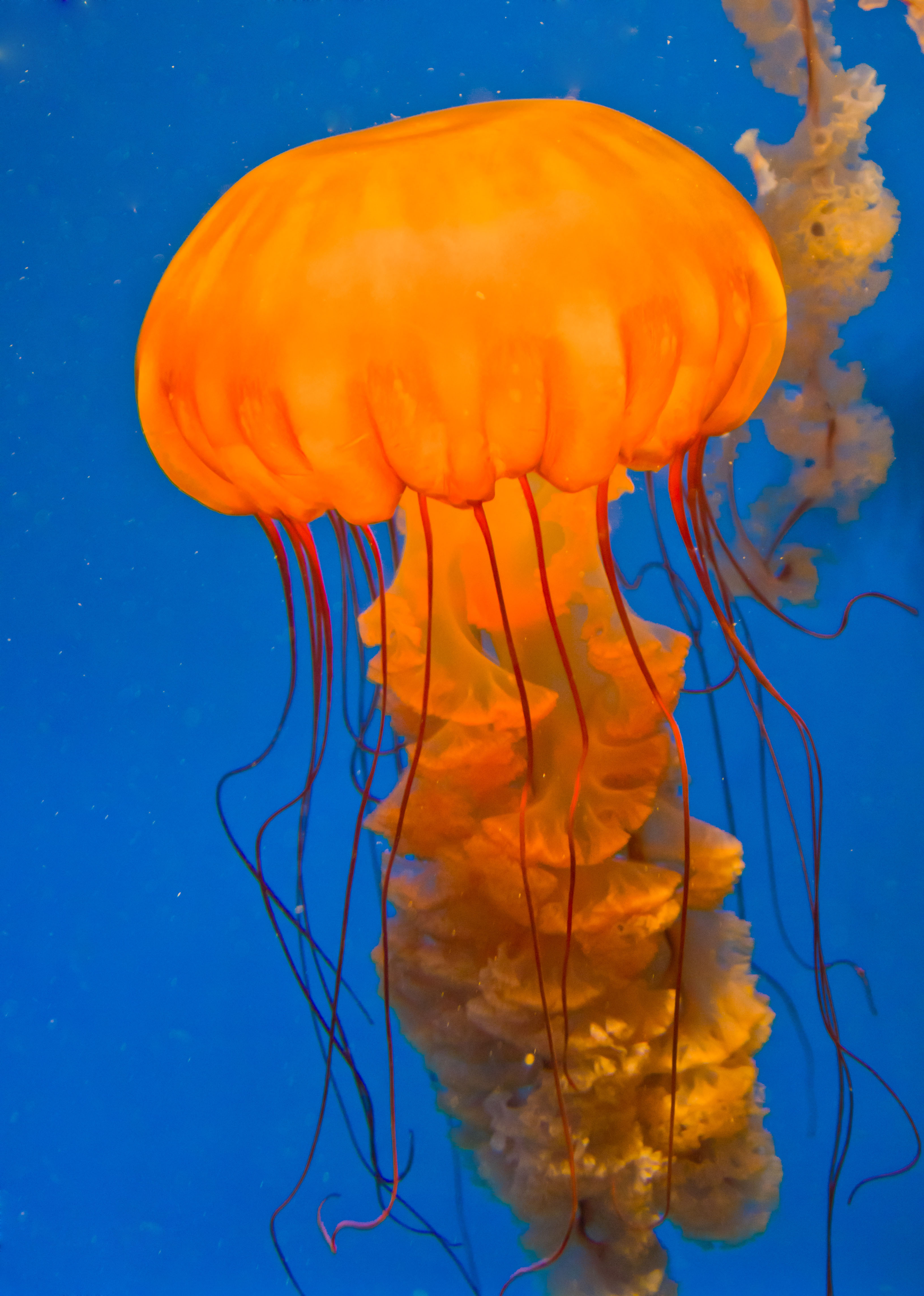

The medusae of C. quinquecirrha measures up to 40 cm (16 in) in diameter. The sea nettle is radially symmetrical, marine, and carnivorous. Its mouth is located at the center of one end of the body, which opens to a gastrovascular cavity that is used for digestion. It has tentacles that surround the mouth to capture food. Sea nettles have no excretory or respiratory organs. Each sea nettle is either in a free-swimming stage or a polyp stage. The free-swimming stage, or medusa stage reproduces sexually, and the polyp stage reproduces asexually.

The Atlantic sea nettle is a bell-shaped invertebrate, usually semi-transparent and with small, white dots and reddish-brown stripes. Sea nettles without stripes have a bell that appears white or opaque. The sea nettle's sting is rated from "moderate" to "severe" and can be noxious to smaller prey; it is not, however, potent enough to cause human death, except by allergic reaction. While the sting is not particularly harmful, it can cause moderate discomfort to any individual stung. The sting can be effectively neutralized by misting vinegar over the affected area. This keeps unfired nematocysts from firing and adding to the discomfort.

== Feeding habits ==
Stinging sea nettles are carnivorous. They generally feed on zooplankton, ctenophores, other jellies, and sometimes crustaceans. Sea nettles immobilize and obtain their prey using their stinging tentacles. After that, the prey is transported to the gastrovascular cavity where it is subsequently digested.

Sea nettles are also able to consume minnows, bay anchovy eggs, worms, and mosquito larvae.

== Defense mechanisms ==
Each sea nettle tentacle is coated with thousands of microscopic cnidocytes; in turn, every individual cnidocyte has a "trigger" (cnidocil) paired with a capsule containing a coiled stinging filament. Upon contact, the cnidocil will immediately initiate a process which ejects the venom-coated filament from its capsule and into the target. This will inject toxins capable of killing smaller prey or stunning perceived predators. On humans, this will most likely cause a nonlethal, but nevertheless painful rash typically persisting for about 20 minutes. Some earlier cases of sea nettle stings from the Philippines reportedly had more severe effects: one account describes a sting causing vascular insufficiency, and another mononeuritis.

Rather than toxic substances, some cnidocytes contain adhesion used to entangle or anchor its target.

== Predators ==
The defense mechanisms of the sea nettle reduce the amount of natural predators. The Atlantic sea nettle is prey to mainly sea turtles, ocean sunfish, and larger jellyfish.

== See also ==
- Sea wasp
