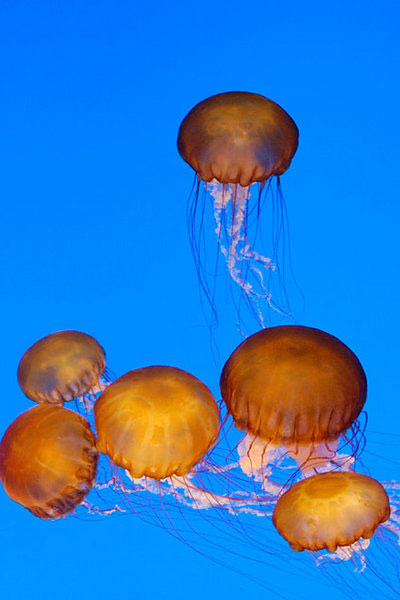
- Chrysaora fuscescens in a Kreisel tank
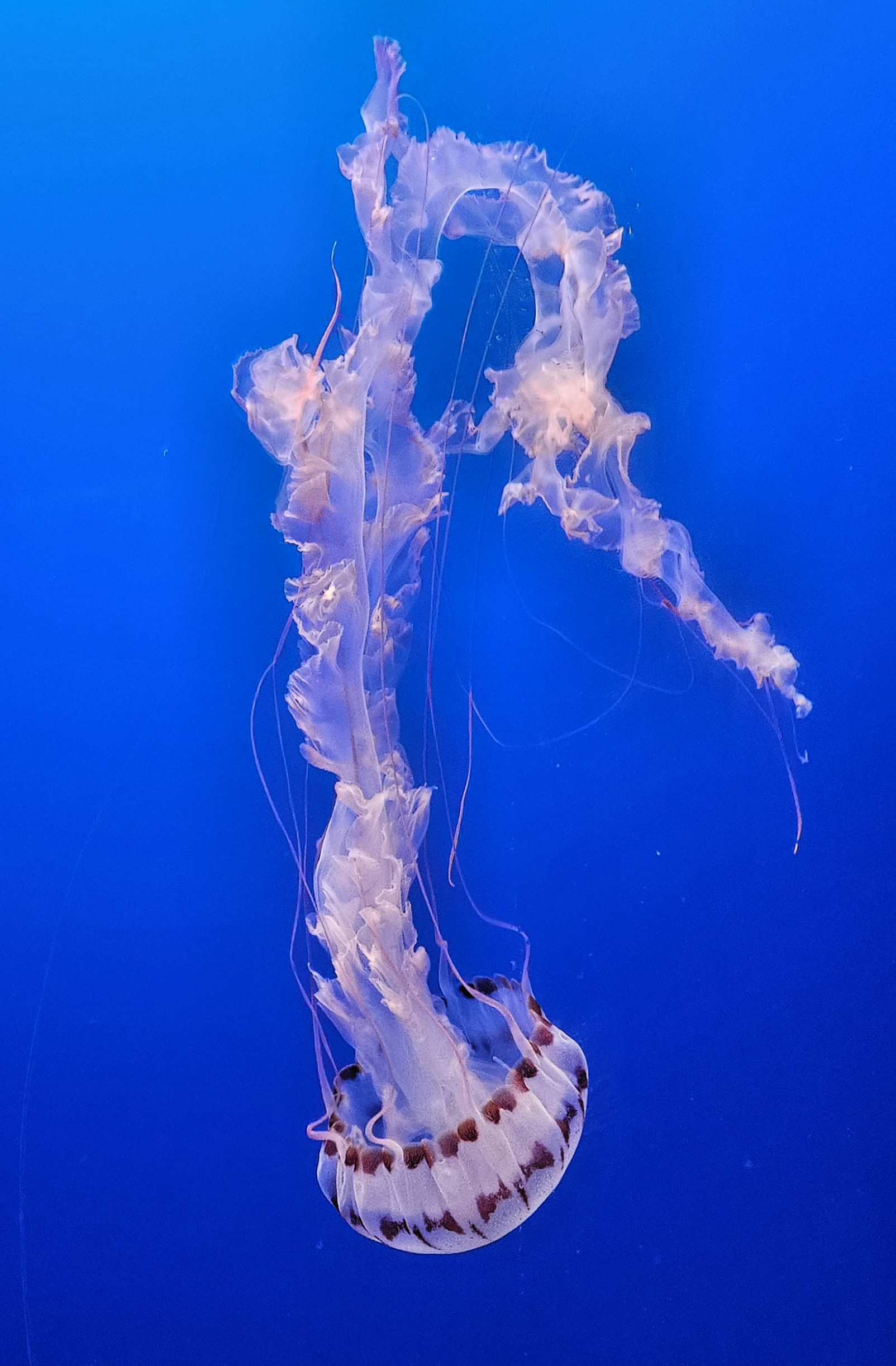
- Chrysaora colorata at the Monterey Bay Aquarium, Monterey, California, USA

Scientific classification
- Kingdom: Animalia
- Phylum: Cnidaria
- Class: Scyphozoa
- Order: Semaeostomeae
- Family: Pelagiidae
- Genus: Chrysaora; Péron & Lesueur, 1809

Species
- See text

Synonyms
- Dactylometra Agassiz, 1862; Kuragea Kishinouye, 1902

= Chrysaora =

Genus of jellyfish

Captive sea nettles swimming in a tank

Chrysaora (/ˈkraɪseɪˌɔːrə/) is a genus of jellyfish, commonly called the sea nettles, in the family Pelagiidae. The origin of the genus name Chrysaora lies in Greek mythology with Chrysaor, brother of Pegasus and son of Poseidon and Medusa. Translated, Chrysaor means "he who has a golden armament."

== Species ==
There are 16 recognized species in the genus Chrysaora:

- Chrysaora achlyos Martin, Gershwin, Burnett, Cargo & Bloom 1997) – black sea nettle
- Chrysaora africana (Vanhöffen, 1902) - Southern African Sea Nettle
- Chrysaora agulhensis Ras, Neethling, Engelbrecht, Morandini, Bayha, Skrypzeck & Gibbons, 2020 - Agulhas Sea Nettle
- Chrysaora chesapeakei (Papenfuss, 1936) - bay nettle
- Chrysaora chinensis Vanhöffen, 1888
- Chrysaora colorata (Russell 1964) – purple-striped jelly
- Chrysaora fulgida (Reynaud 1830) - Benguela Compass Jelly
- Chrysaora fuscescens Brandt 1835 – Pacific sea nettle
- Chrysaora helvola Brandt, 1838
- Chrysaora hysoscella (L. 1766) – compass jellyfish
- Chrysaora lactea Eschscholtz 1829 - Milk Sea Nettle
- Chrysaora melanaster Brandt 1838 – northern sea nettle
- Chrysaora pacifica (Goette 1886) – Japanese sea nettle
- Chrysaora pentastoma Péron & Lesueur, 1810 -Australian Sea Nettle
- Chrysaora plocamia (Lesson 1830) – South American sea nettle
- Chrysaora quinquecirrha (Desor 1848) – Atlantic sea nettle

=== Invalid species names ===
- Chrysaora blossevillei Lesson 1830 [nomen dubium]
- Chrysaora caliparea (Reynaud 1830) [species inquirenda]
- Chrysaora depressa (Kishinouye 1902) [accepted as Chrysaora melanaster Brandt 1838]
- Chrysaora kynthia Gershwin & Zeidler 2008 [nomen dubium]
- Chrysaora southcotti Gershwin & Zeidler 2008 [accepted as Chrysaora pentastoma Péron & Lesueur, 1810]
- Chrysaora wurlerra Gershwin & Zeidler 2008 [nomen dubium]
