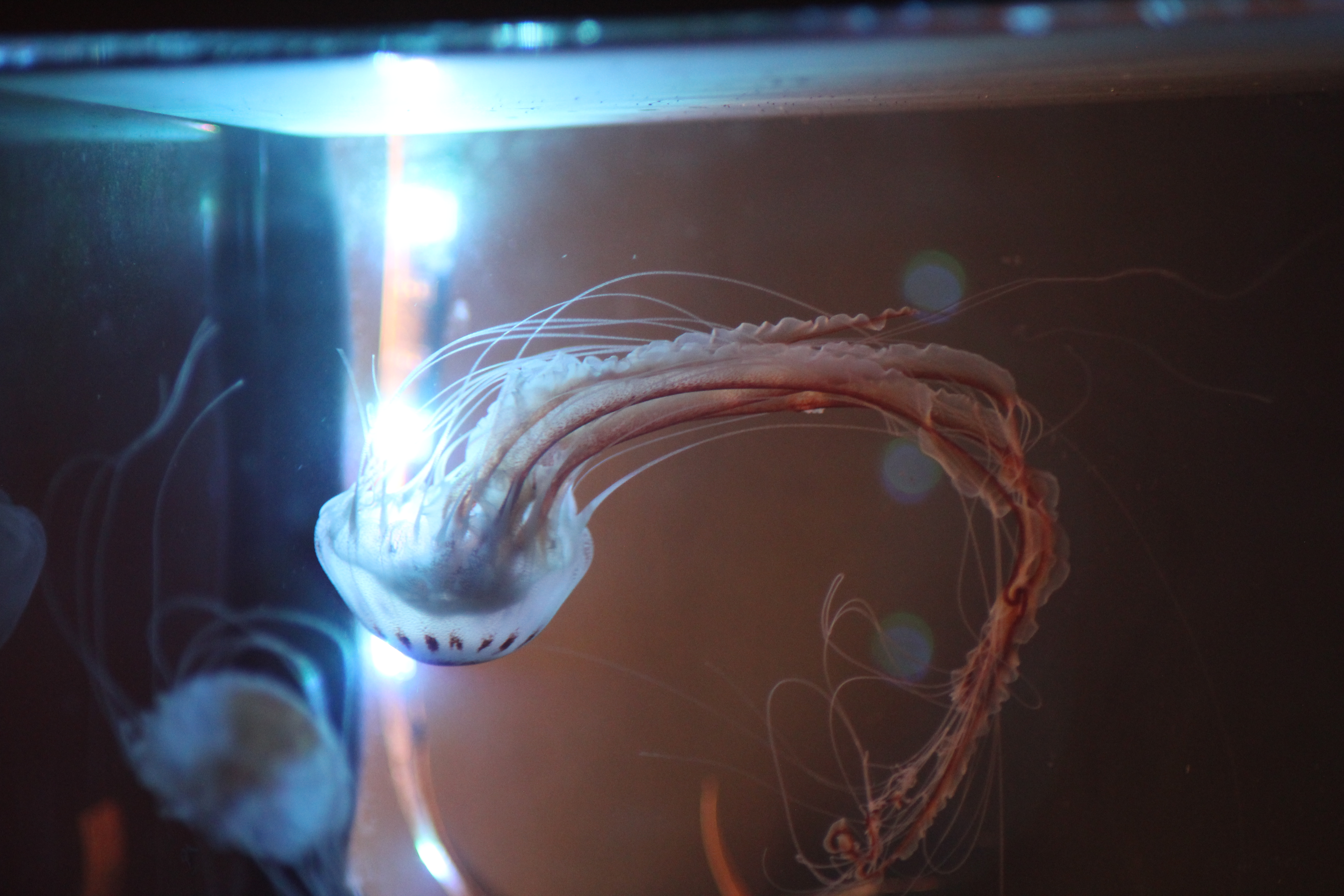
- An example of C. Chesapeakei

Scientific classification
- Kingdom: Animalia
- Phylum: Cnidaria
- Class: Scyphozoa
- Order: Semaeostomeae
- Family: Pelagiidae
- Genus: Chrysaora
- Species: C. chesapeakei

Binomial name
- Chrysaora chesapeakei (Papenfuss, 1936)

Synonyms
- Dactylometra quinquecirrha var. chesapeakei Papenfuss, 1936

= Chrysaora chesapeakei =

Species of jellyfish

Chrysaora chesapeakei is a sea nettle from the family Pelagiidae. It was shown to be a distinct species from Chrysaora quinquecirrha in 2017. Since then, it is also commonly known as the bay nettle. It is found mainly in estuaries of the eastern coast of the U.S.A and is especially known from the Chesapeake Bay, but can also be found in the open Gulf of Mexico.

== Description ==
Similar to other species of sea nettle, C. chesapeakei has a centrally located mouth surrounded by oral arms. It has a vaguely saucer-like shaped bell and typically has four long, lacy oral arms hanging from the bell. They usually have around twenty-four tentacles. The tentacles do contain a toxin that is capable of stinging and causing pain to humans. However, the toxin is not strong enough to prove fatal to a human, unless the toxin were to cause an allergic reaction.

In 2017, C. chesapeakei was differentiated as a separate species from C. quinquecirrha based on genetic and morphological differences. Compared to C. quinquecirrha, C. chesapeakei has a bell size that is on average half as small, usually around 10 centimeters (3.9 in). It also has fewer tentacles and longer oral arms.

== Lifecycle ==
When the eggs of C. chesapeakei are developed, the mother jellyfish will carry them on her oral arms until the ciliated planulae develop. They will then swim until they find some sort of substrate on which to attach themselves. Typically, that substrate would be something hard and rough with plenty of shade, but mostly they will attach to the shells of oysters. In either case, they begin to develop into polyps. From this point, if conditions are favorable, they will undergo a process known as strobilation. This is when the polyp asexually produces the ephyrae into the water, which then develop into the medusae. If conditions are not favorable, the polyps will continue in their benthic stage where they will wait for the return of favorable conditions.

== Feeding ==
Individuals of the C. chesapeakei species are carnivorous. They generally feed on plankton and small marine invertebrates such as crustaceans and ctenophores. They can also act as a food source for several types of sea turtle.

Due to their feeding habits, C. chesapeakei have become an important species in the Chesapeake Bay. A species of ctenophore, Mnemiopsis leidei, has had a negative impact on many of the economically important fishing industries in the Chesapeake Bay. However, due to the fact that C. chesapeakei regularly feeds on the ctenophores, this species has been kept in check and the predatory impact of ctenophores subsides once bay nettles reach high numbers in the summertime. It is possible that as climate change becomes a greater issue, there may be fluctuations in the availability of the populations of both species.

== Distribution ==
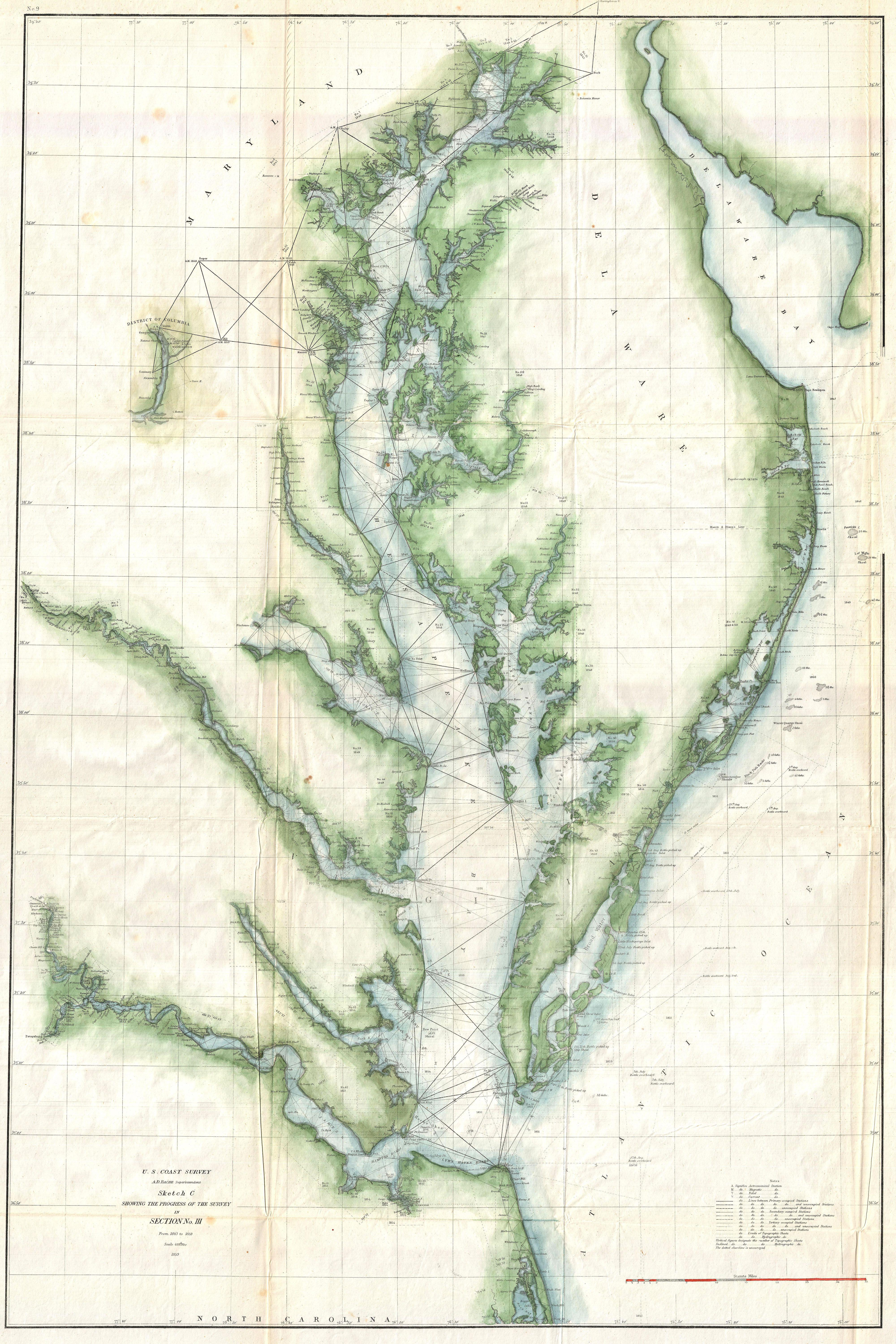
The Chesapeake Bay

C. chesapeakei can be found in several different types of water, including the open ocean, brackish water, bays, and estuaries. It is most commonly found in the Chesapeake Bay, which is how it got its name, but it can also be found in many bays and estuaries along the U.S. east coast and even in the Gulf of Mexico.
