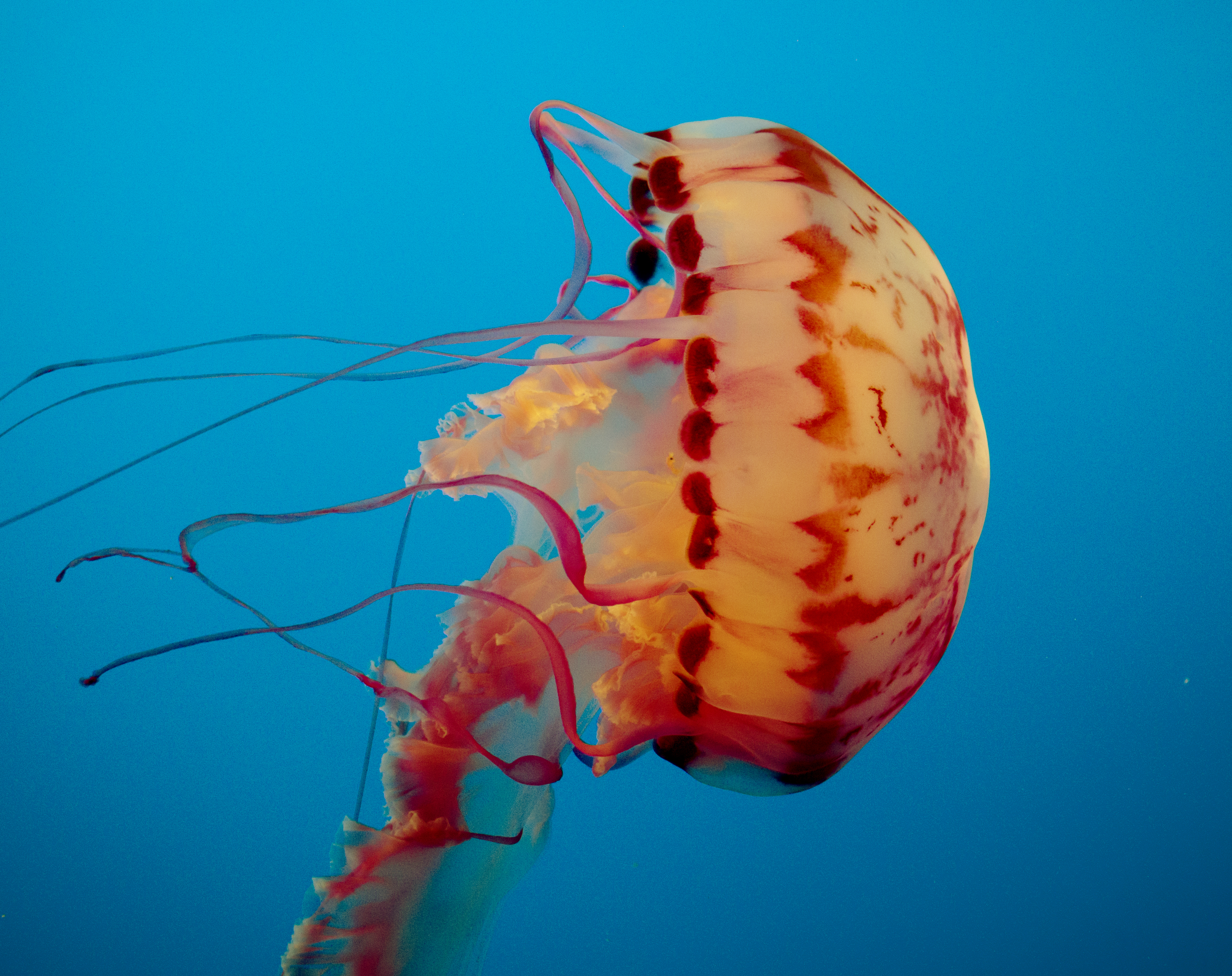
- A juvenile purple-striped jelly (Chrysaora colorata) on exhibit at Monterey Bay Aquarium

Scientific classification
- Kingdom: Animalia
- Phylum: Cnidaria
- Class: Scyphozoa
- Order: Semaeostomeae
- Family: Pelagiidae
- Genus: Chrysaora
- Species: C. colorata

Binomial name
- Chrysaora colorata (Russell, 1964)

Synonyms
- Pelagia colorata

= Chrysaora colorata =

Species of jellyfish

Chrysaora colorata (Russell), commonly known as the purple-striped jelly or purple-striped sea nettle, is a species of jellyfish that exists primarily off the coast of California from Bodega Bay to San Diego. The bell (body) of the jellyfish is up to 70 cm (2.3 ft) in diameter, typically with a radial pattern of stripes. The tentacles vary with the age of the individual, consisting typically of eight marginal long dark arms, and four central frilly oral arms. It is closely studied by scientists due to not much being known about their eating habits. A 15-foot-long specimen has been seen.

Often young Cancer crabs make home in the jellyfish and eat the parasitic amphipods that feed on and damage the jellyfish. C. colorata are more active in a lively current, which makes it easier for them to move and capture their prey.

== Description ==
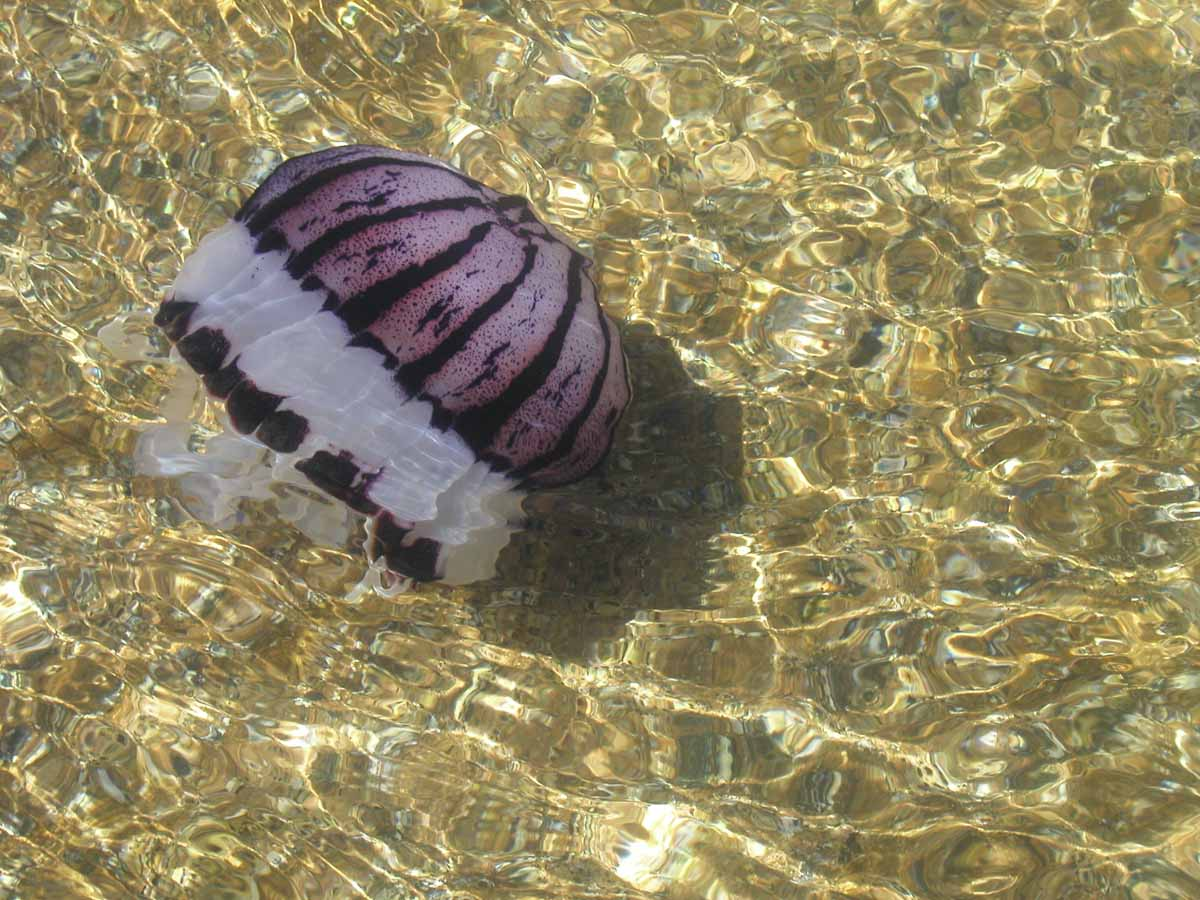
Adult

The jellyfish gets its name from the purple stripes on its bell. Juveniles are a pinkish color and its tentacles are long and dark maroon. As they age, the dark maroon color of the tentacles starts to fade, the purple appears as stripes on the bell and the four frilly oral arms will also become longer. In addition, the tentacles thicken and the purple stripes start to darken and the tentacles start to look pale, its oral arms like to disappear.

== Diet ==
They are known to feed on a variety of organisms including zooplankton, Cladocera, Appendicularia, Copepoda, Hydromedusae, Siphonophorae, and fish eggs. When the prey touches a marginal tentacle, stingers are immediately discharged to paralyze prey and marginal tentacle bends inward to the nearest oral arm. The oral arm is used to transport prey to the gastrovascular cavity (GVC) and to catch motionless prey. The sting of this jellyfish is extremely painful to humans but is rare.

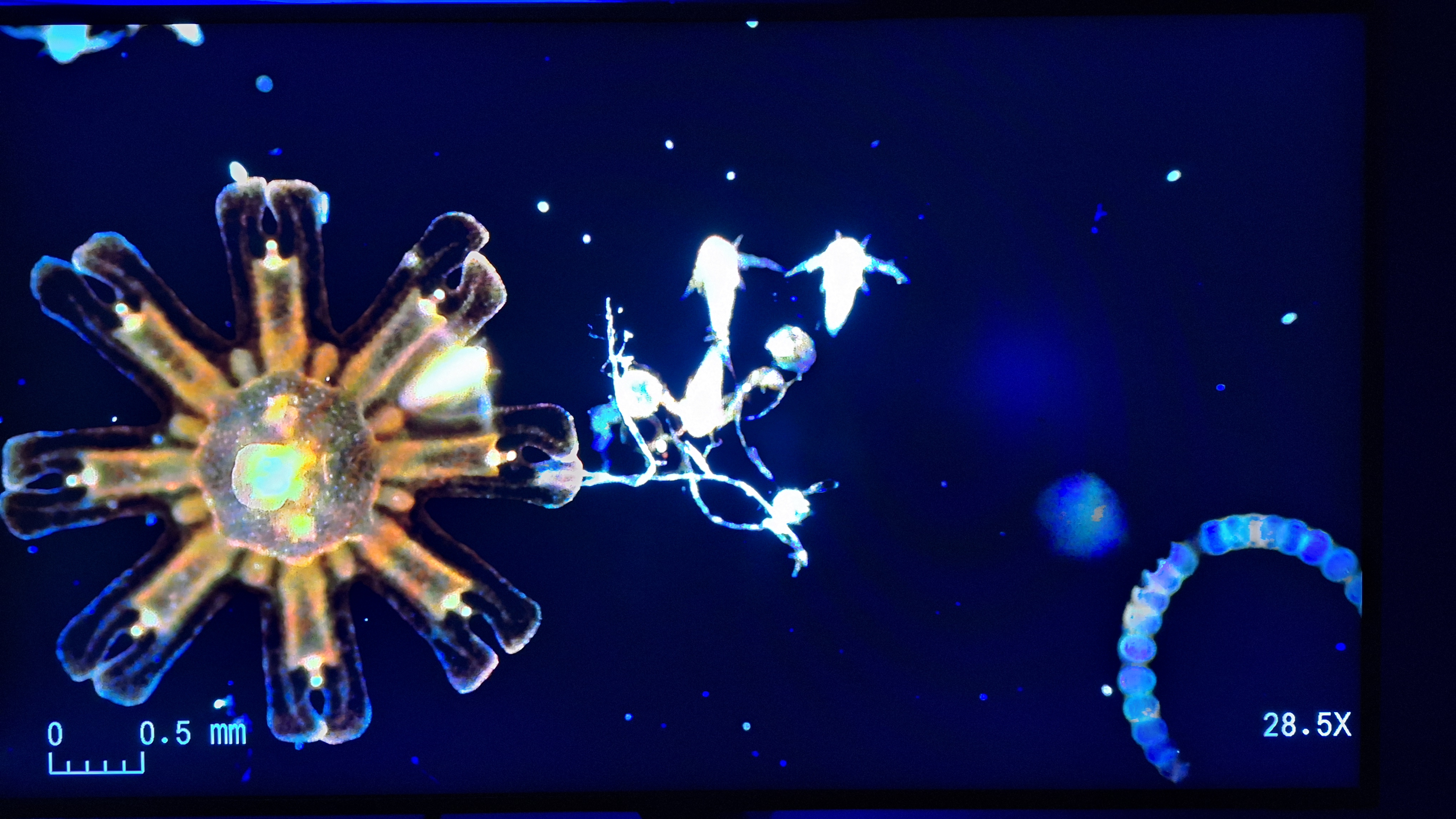
Larval Purple Striped Jellyfish

Its diet consists of zooplankton, including copepods, larval fish, ctenophores, salps, other jellies, and fish eggs.

== Predation ==
The C. colorata is primarily preyed upon by leatherback turtles. They are selected as prey due to the high concentrations of carbon and nitrogen in their four oral arms. They are particularly nutrient-dense during the post-upwelling season, which is when the leatherback concentration in the area is at its highest.
