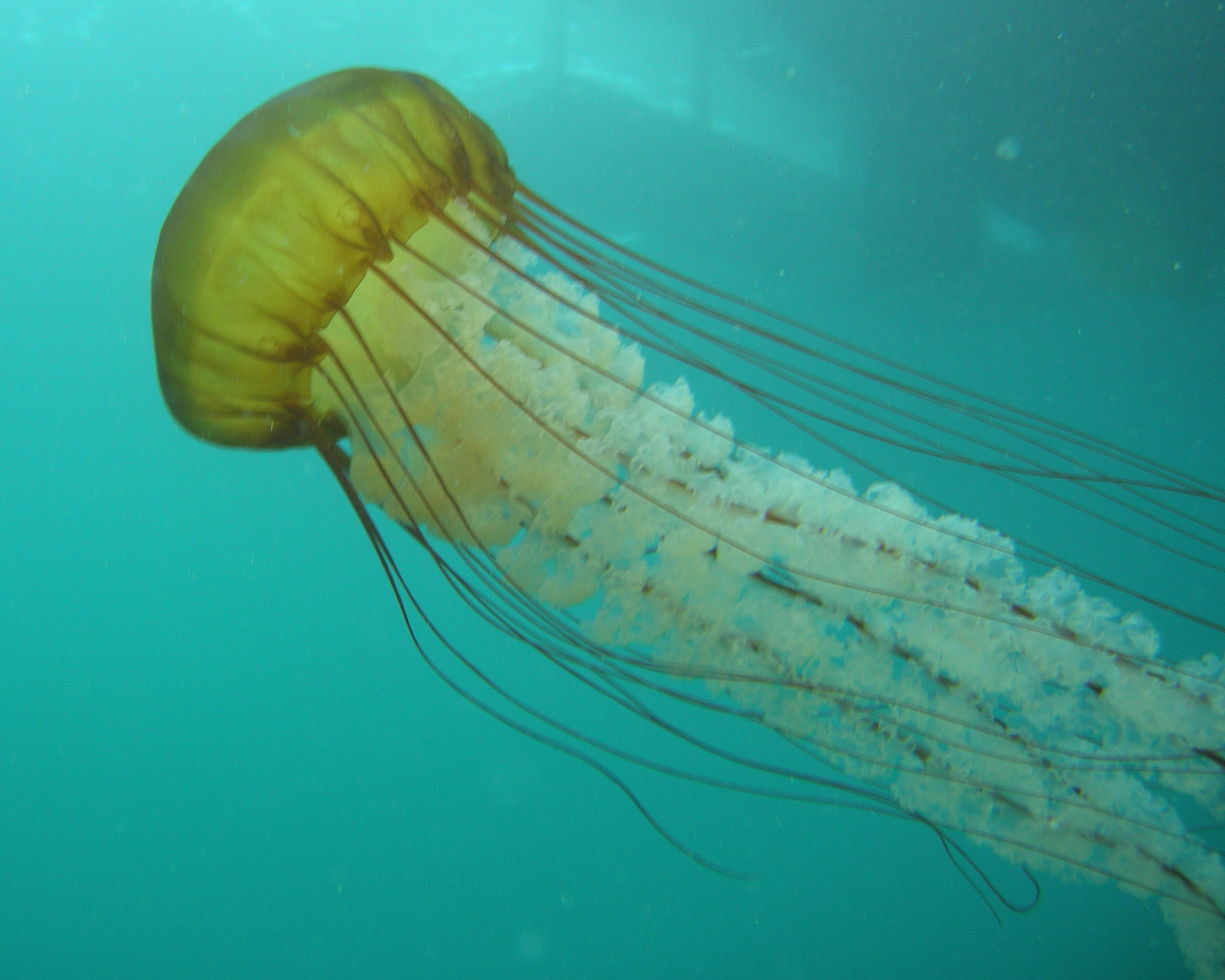

Scientific classification
- Kingdom: Animalia
- Phylum: Cnidaria
- Class: Scyphozoa
- Order: Semaeostomeae
- Family: Pelagiidae
- Genus: Chrysaora
- Species: C. fuscescens

Binomial name
- Chrysaora fuscescens Brandt, 1835

Synonyms
- Chrysaora helvola Brandt, 1838

= Chrysaora fuscescens =

Species of cnidarian

Chrysaora fuscescens, the Pacific sea nettle or West Coast sea nettle, is a regionally distributed jellyfish that lives in the northeastern Pacific Ocean, in temperate waters off of British Columbia and the West Coast of the United States, ranging south to Point Conception. The Pacific sea nettle earned its common name in-reference to its, 'nettle'-like sting; much like the stinging nettle plant (Urtica dioica), this sea nettle's sting is often irritating or itchy (possibly mildly painful) to humans, but rarely dangerous.

The Pacific sea nettle has a distinctive, golden-brown bell with a reddish tint. The bell can grow to be ~50 cm in diameter in the wild. The long and spiraling, whitish oral arms (and 24, maroon tentacles) may trail behind the nettle as far as 15 feet (4.6 m).

Since about the 1990s, C. fuscescens has proven to be a very popular cnidarian to feature at aquariums (and even some zoos with aquatic exhibits), mainly due to the public's fascination with their bright colors and extremely long tentacles. Additionally, the species is known for being quite low-maintenance in captivity, when provided with the appropriate water parameters and conditions. When these medusae are actively thriving under ideal conditions, they can even be easily bred via the culturing of polyps.

== Taxonomy ==
Johann Friedrich von Brandt described this species in 1835. The origin of the genus name Chrysaora lies in Greek mythology, with Chrysaor, brother of Pegasus, the son of Poseidon and Medusa. Translated, Chrysaor is Greek for "he who has a golden armament", in reference to the goldenrod color of the nettle's bell. The species name, fuscescens, is Latin for "dark into light".

== Distribution and habitat ==
Chrysaora fuscescens is commonly found along the coasts of southern British Columbia, Washington, Oregon and most of California to Point Conception. The populations reach their peak during the early summer. Over the past 20 years, populations of C. fuscescens have shifted northward from offshore Monterey Bay and San Francisco Bay to Oregon and Washington coasts, which is directly related to warming SST.

== Feeding and predators ==
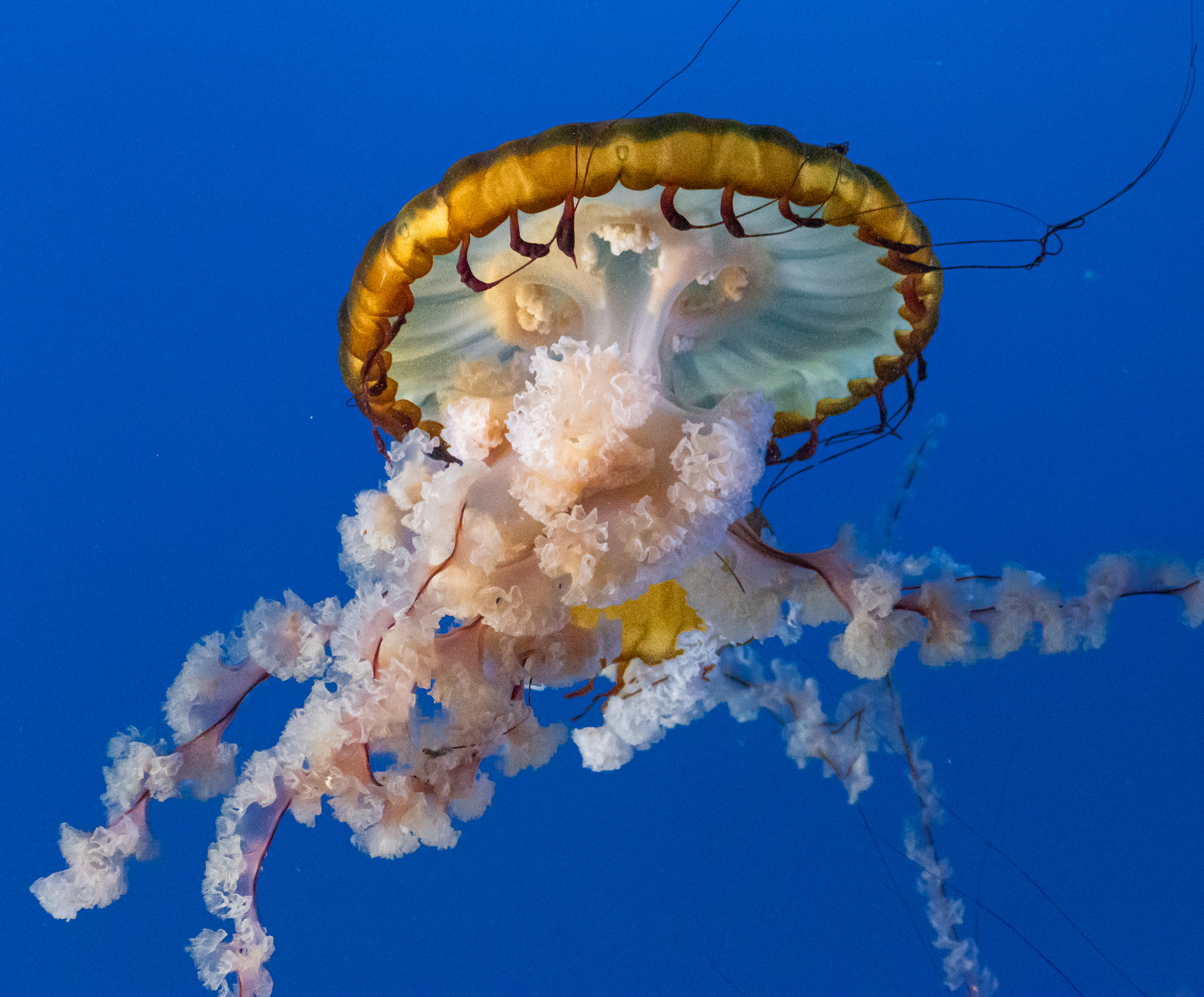
Pacific Sea Nettle at the Oregon Coast Aquarium

In common with other cnidaria, Chrysaora fuscescens are carnivorous animals. They catch their prey via drift feeding by means of cnidocyst (or nematocyst) -laden tentacles that hang down in the water. The toxins in their nematocysts are effective against both their prey and humans, though it is typically nonlethal to the latter. Because C. fuscescens cannot chase after their prey, they must eat as they drift. By spreading out their tentacles like a large net, the sea nettle is able to catch food as it passes by. When prey come into contact with the tentacles, thousands of nematocysts discharge, launching barbed stingers that injects venom composed of various proteins, including proteases and pore forming toxins, which can disrupt cell membranes and tissues. The oral arms begin digestion as they transport the prey into the sea nettle's mouth.

C. fuscescens feeds on a wide variety of zooplankton, crustaceans, salps, pelagic snails, as well as small fish, their eggs, and larvae, and other jellyfish. Copepods often dominate gut contents, prey selection analyses indicate a preference for slow moving or non-motile prey such as fish eggs, while more motile prey are selected against. Due to the growing population of C. fuscescens, they seem to be reducing fish populations and have become nuisances to the fishermen of Oregon by clogging up fishing nets. Their dense swarms have also become problematic for scientific trawls and water intake.

Despite having a potent sting, some animals, apparently, are not bothered or affected by the defense mechanism at all; C. fuscescens often falls prey to many marine birds, large fish and some cetaceans, and are especially relished by leatherback turtles.

== Reproduction ==
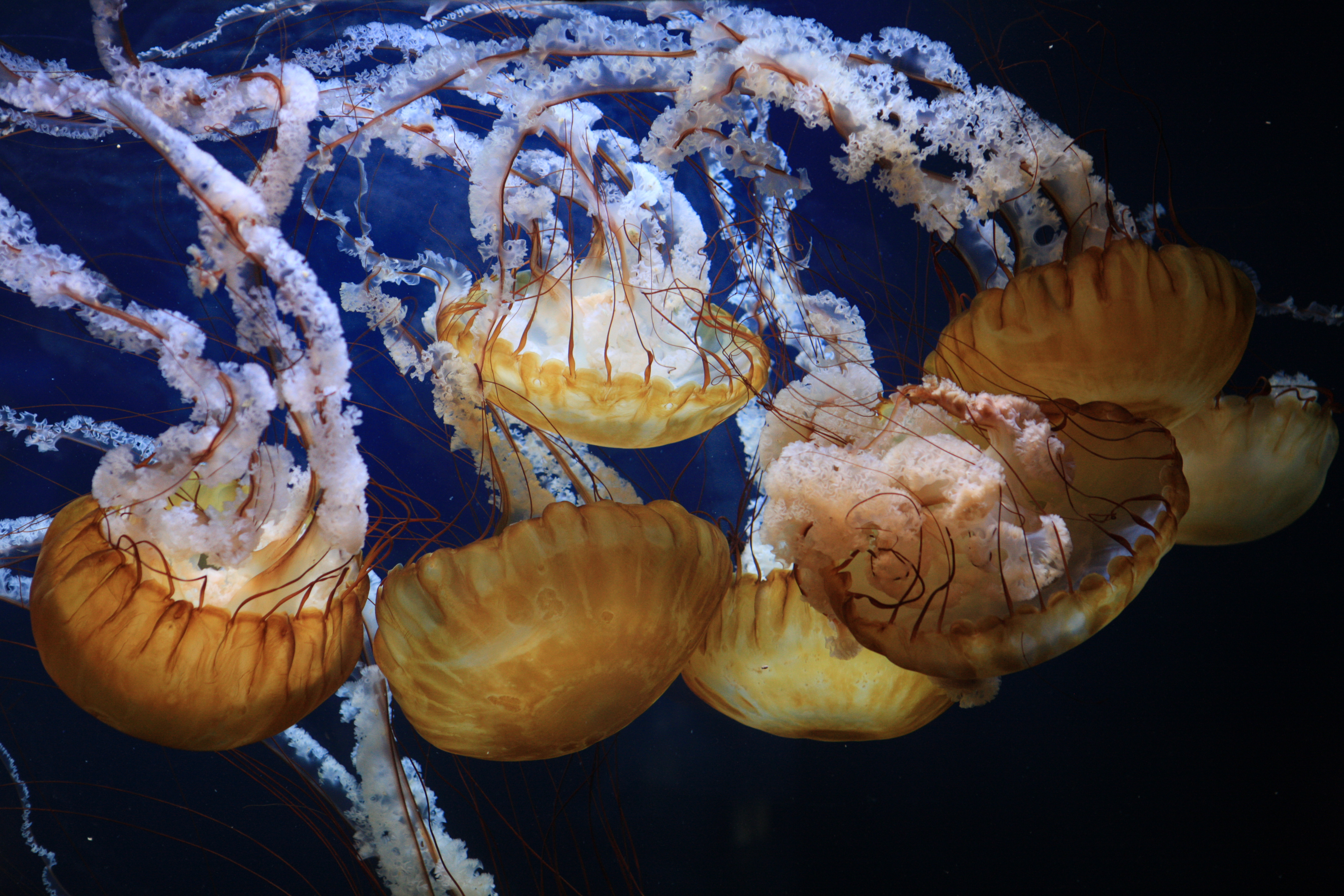

Chrysaora fuscescens is capable of both sexual reproduction in the medusa stage and asexual reproduction in the polyp stage. The life cycle of C. fuscescens has been poorly studied. Males and females release sperm and egg into the water where fertilization occurs and planulae larvae form, the free-swimming larval stage of cnidarians. Planluae settle on substrate (unknown locations) and grow into polyps. The polyp undergoes asexual reproduction by several methods; budding, podocyst, strobilation and fission. Though budding and fission are rare in Chrysaoras with podocyst production being the primary means of asexual reproduction. Polyps can then seasonally undergo strobilation where strobila form and eventually release ephyrae that will develop into adult sea nettles that become sexually mature to start the cycle again .
