= Jellyfish bloom =

Large growth of a jellyfish population

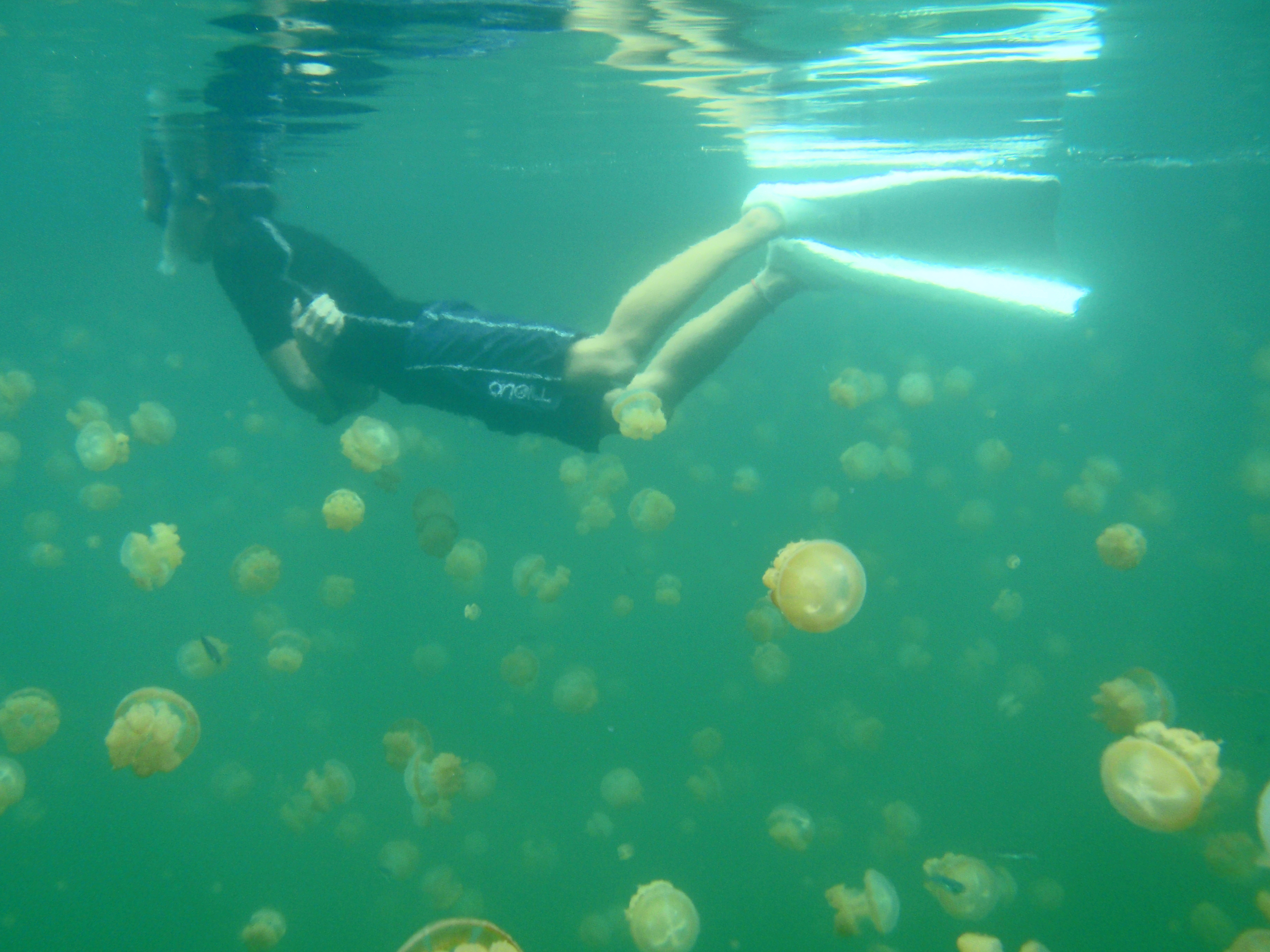
A golden jellyfish bloom in Jellyfish Lake, Palau

Jellyfish blooms are substantial growths in population of species under the phyla Cnidaria (including several types of jellyfish) and Ctenophora (comb jellies).

Blooms may take place naturally as a result of ocean and wind patterns, ecosystem shifts, and jellyfish behaviors though their occurrence is thought to have increased during the last several decades in near-shore regions and shallow seas around the world. Changes in ocean conditions including eutrophication, hypoxia, rising ocean temperatures, and coastal development, among others are thought to be the main causes of increasing jellyfish blooms. Little is known regarding how future environmental conditions will affect jellyfish blooms, though this is a growing field of research.

Jellyfish blooms significantly impact ecological community composition and structure by reducing available prey for higher predators. Blooms also significantly alter carbon, nitrogen, and phosphorus cycling, shifting the availability to microbial communities. Recent blooms have commonly overlapped with multiple industries, reducing fisheries catch, clogging fishing nets and power plant pipes, and overwhelming popular beach destinations leading to closures.

== Causes ==
A jellyfish bloom is defined as a substantial increase in a jellyfish population within a short time period; the result of a higher reproduction rate. Since jellyfish naturally have high reproductive rates, high-density blooms can occur as a result of both behavioral and ecological causes.

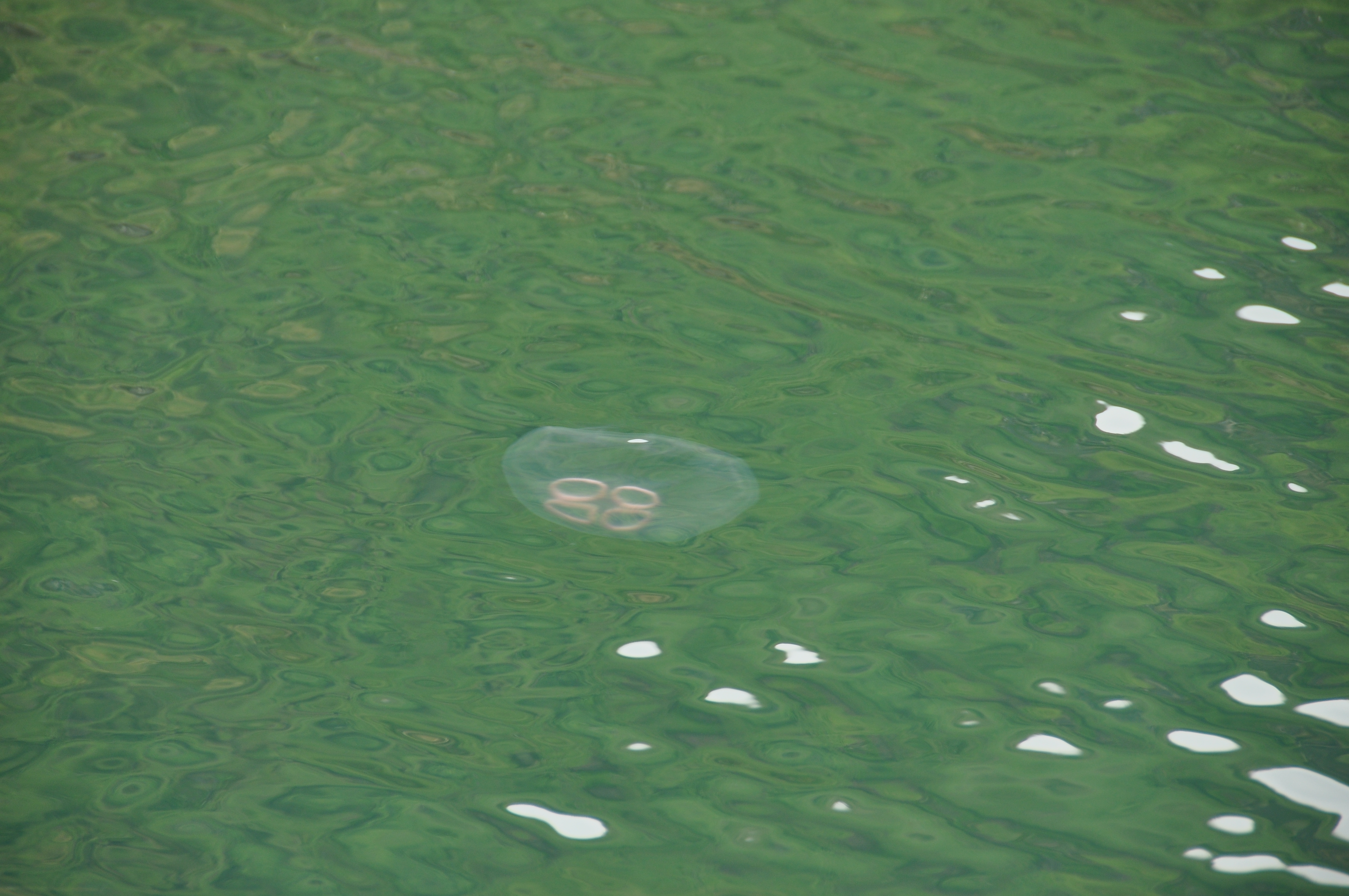
Jellyfish in Martin's Haven in green, nutrient dense water. St. Brides Bay, an adjacent body of water, is considered prone to eutrophication.

The frequency of jellyfish blooms is currently being investigated to determine if global trends are increasing as climate patterns shift. Eutrophication, hypoxic dead zones, rising global ocean temperatures, coastal development, and overfishing, are suspected to be stimulating the growth of jellyfish populations. Eutrophication, for example, provides an excess of nutrients, which leads to abnormally large algal blooms that support rapid jellyfish population growth. Algae that are not consumed eventually expire and are consumed by the microbial community, which may lead to hypoxia. Jellyfish can tolerate hypoxic conditions where more sensitive species cannot. Cultural eutrophication and the increasing hypoxia in the Gulf of Mexico, for example, appears to have also increased jellyfish populations.

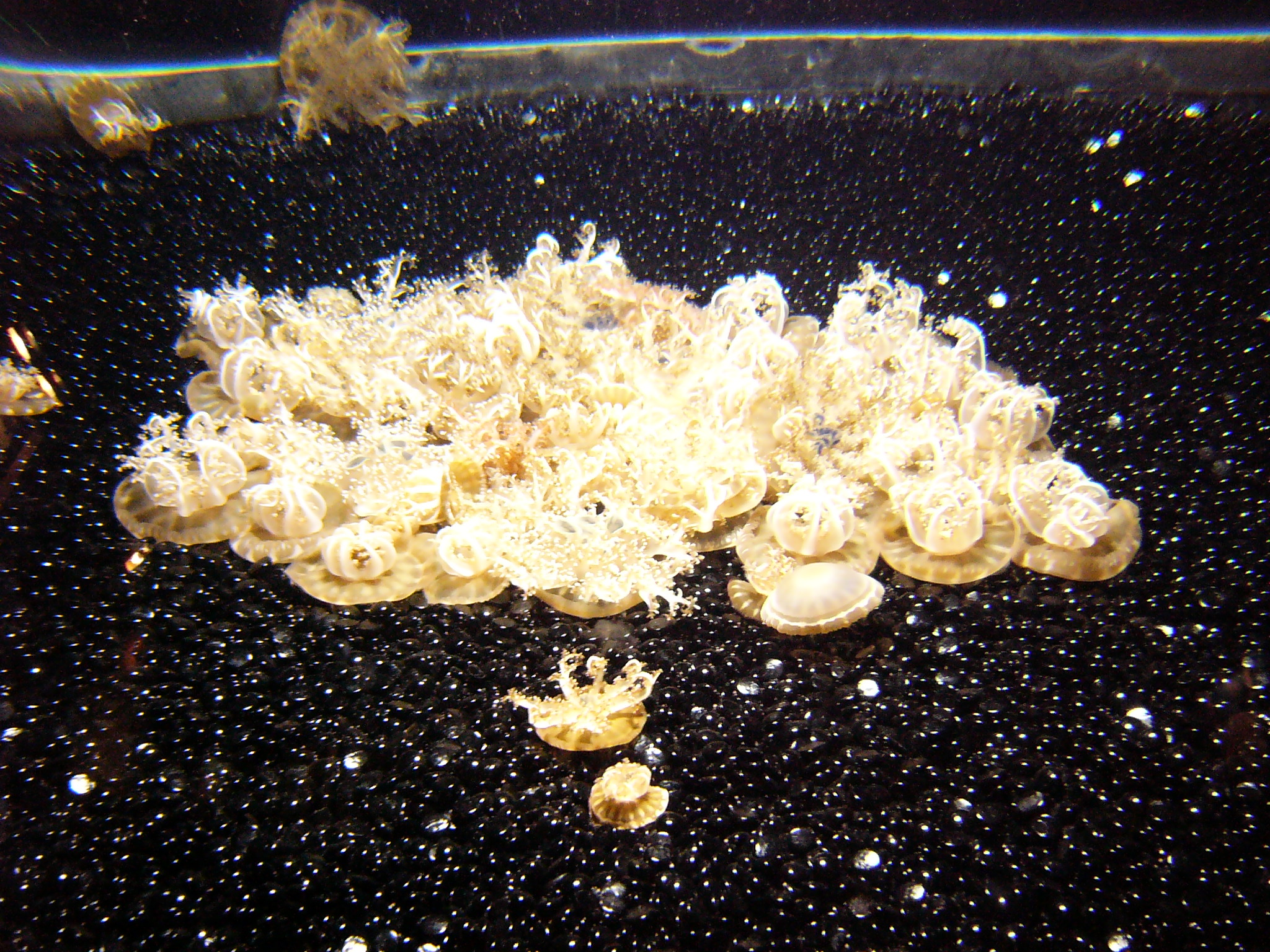
Jellyfish conglomeration on an artificial surface, Monterey Aquarium.

Spring and summer months typically have more jellyfish blooms because the warmer water temperatures cause jellyfish to reach sexual maturity more quickly. Rising global ocean temperatures may also contribute to the increasing jellyfish populations.

Over-fishing of jellyfish predators releases jellyfish populations from top-down control. For example, reduced competition from small pelagic fish in the Black Sea due to fishing has led to an apparent increase in polyp proliferation, the earliest developmental stage of jellyfish.

Coastal development has also created physical changes to coastal ecosystems that favor rapid jellyfish growth. Hard structures provide more space for jellyfish polyps to adhere to and develop on. Floating artificial structures increase shaded substrate area jellyfish polyps thrive on. Between 10,000 and 100,000 jellyfish polyps per square meter were directly or indirectly attached to artificial structures as counted in one investigation. Both increased substrate and nitrogen concentration in harbors favor higher polyp population densities. Jellyfish also thrive in dammed areas because they are more tolerant to variable salinity.

== Ecological impacts ==
=== Food web impact ===
A boom in jellyfish populations can have significant effects on food web structure across trophic levels. Some species of carnivorous jellyfish actively consume ichthyoplankton, fish eggs and larvae. The ability of jellyfish to consume ichthyoplankton is influenced by a number of characteristics including tentacle morphology, type of cnidarian nematocyst, rates of encounters, size of predator, swimming-while-feeding behavior, and prey physical characteristics. Fish eggs and small larvae make ideal prey for carnivorous jellyfish and other predators, as they have low escape ability and are larger in size compared to other zooplankton. Removal of competitive top-predator fish due to overfishing has resulted in reduced competition for jellyfish food resources. During a jellyfish bloom, ichthyoplankton, crustacean zooplankton (e.g. copepods and krill), and smaller medusae can be more heavily consumed. Some studies have shown jellyfish can outcompete other predators in a bloom. For example, in the 1999 Chrysaora melanaster bloom in the Bering Sea, Brodeur et al. found that the bloom had consumed roughly 32% of the total zooplankton stock, which was nearly 5% of the annual secondary production of the region. In non-bloom conditions, zooplankton consumption by jellyfish was <1% of the annual zooplankton stock.

Importantly, jellyfish blooms do not always directly result in depletion of zooplankton and other competing mid-trophic species. Jellyfish blooms can have a more complicated role in food web dynamics and overall estuary health. In the case of Chesapeake Bay, sea nettles (Chrysaora quinquecirrha) served as a dominant top-down control within the estuarine ecosystem and were tightly coupled with oyster populations. Seasonal blooms of sea nettles were partially dependent on oyster populations as oysters provided the most extensive hard substrate in Chesapeake Bay, which was critical for the polyp stage of sea nettle development. As sea nettle population decreased the top-down control on ctenophores (Mnemiopsis leidyi) was essentially removed, allowing ctenophores to increase resulting increased ctenophore predation on oyster larvae and icthyoplankton. This ultimately exacerbated the decline of both sea nettle and oyster populations.

Increase in jellyfish predation on zooplankton during blooms can also alter trophic pathways. Consumption by small and large gelatinous zooplankton interrupts energy transfer of zooplankton production to upper trophic levels. Since jellyfish have few predators (large pelagic fish and sea turtles), jellyfish production does not transfer efficiently to higher trophic levels and can become a "trophic dead-end".

=== Impacts on biochemical processes ===
Jellyfish blooms may alter elemental cycling of carbon (C), nitrogen (N), and phosphorus (P) in the ocean. As jellyfish populations increase they consume organic material containing C, N, and P, becoming a net sink of organic compounds. Through their rapid growth, jellyfish may therefore reduce the organic material available for other organisms. Since their gelatinous bodies are not consumed by many higher trophic level organisms, jellyfish limit the trophic transfer of energy and C, N, and P up the food chain, instead shifting the trophic transfer to the microbial community.

Jellyfish can be one of the largest stores of biomass in the pelagic community during blooms; this makes them an important source of organic C, N, and P. Large populations of jellyfish also mobilize inorganic C, N, and P by moving to different regions and emitting them through excretion, mucus production, or decomposition. One contingency on how jellyfish blooms affect their environment depends on whether they possess the symbiotic algae called zooxanthellae. Jellyfish with zooxanthellae obtain organic C, N, and P through translocation from their symbiont, incorporating inorganic nutrients through photosynthesis. Zooxanthellae give jellyfish an advantage when organic matter is in short supply, by producing their own nutrients, also creating competition with primary producers. Zooxanthellate jellyfish also translocate inorganic N and P back to their symbionts rather than excreting it into the water. Alternatively, jellyfish without zooxanthellae are heterotrophic and acquire most of their C, N, and P by ingesting zooplankton. After they consume zooplankton, these jellyfish release dissolved organic and inorganic forms of C, N, and P back into the environment. Non-zooxanthellate jellyfish excrete ammonium and phosphate necessary for primary production and some estimates suggest in some systems they are the second most important source of these nutrients behind weathering.

Jellyfish produce mucus rich in organic C and N that is consumed by microbial communities. The ratio of C:N in the mucus depends on species and symbiotic relationships. Mucus produced by zooxanthellate jellyfish is lower in organic N than non-zooxanthellate species. Alternatively, non-zooxanthellate jellyfish have low C:N ratios which lowers the bacterial growth efficiency and shifts the community toward a respiration-dominated rather than production-dominated system.

Jellyfish blooms are generally short lived, collapsing from food limitations, changes in water temperature or oxygen levels, or completing their life cycle. The death, sinking, and decomposition of jellyfish is rapid and leads to a mass release of dissolved and particulate, organic and inorganic matter in the water column or seafloor creating a significant source of food for the microbial community. Sinking and decomposition rates can vary for jellyfish depending on water temperature and depth. Some jellyfish decompose before reaching the seafloor, releasing organic matter into the water column. Others fall to the floor and then decompose, enriching the sediment with organic matter. In both scenarios the organic matter from the jellyfish is consumed by the bacterial community who simultaneously reduce available oxygen, at times contributing to hypoxia. In some cases, the jelly-falls are too large for consumption and organic matter accumulates on the seafloor creating a physical barrier for diffusion mechanisms, reducing oxygen transport into sediments. The result is an increase of ammonium in the surrounding water from bacterial remineralization and an increase of phosphate in the sediment from low oxygen redox reactions. However, when the decomposition creates low oxygen zones the ammonium cannot be utilized by primary production. Similarly, the low oxygen zones created by microbial respiration further shifts the consumption to the bacterial community (most macrofauna prefer oxygenated environments), again limiting the energy transfer to higher trophic levels.

== Impacts on humans ==
=== Fishing ===
Large jellyfish blooms can disrupt fisheries operations by decreasing catch quality and overwhelming fishing gear. Jellyfish blooms can potentially have detrimental impacts on fisheries by impairing the recruitment of larval fish and outcompeting economically significant fish species. The accidental introduction in the Black Sea, via ballast water, of the ctenophore Mnemiopsis leidyi and the resulting destruction in the early 1990s of the entire anchovy fishery sector is well known. In overexploited fisheries, this can prevent recovery of target fish species and result in the creation of an alternative stable state. Blooms generally coincide with a decrease in fish catch, which results in decreased profits and fewer jobs. Large blooms can also compromise fishing nets and overwhelm gear. These problems along with additional fuel consumption and lost man hours have caused major economic losses for fishing fleets (e.g. roughly €8 million per year for Italian Adriatic fleet).

In contrast, some blooms could potentially benefit commercial fisheries. One example is found in the Chesapeake Bay estuary, where evidence suggests the presence of sea nettles (Chrysaora quinquecirpha) has a positive effect on oyster populations. When abundant, the sea nettles are major predators of Ctenophores, ravenous predators that can compete with oysters. Commercial harvesting of jellyfish has grown in southeast Asia, primarily driven by the increased demand for jellyfish in some Asian cuisines. Jellyfish fisheries could be a strategy for controlling blooms, yet these fisheries still remain small scale and have not yet expanded to markets outside of Asia.

Negative effects of jellyfish blooms are also felt in the aquaculture industry. Jellyfish occasionally find their way into sea pens in industrial fish farms and have been recorded to injure and kill fish. In 2011, a fish farm in Spain reported 50,000 € in profits lost due to fish mortality following an influx of jellyfish into their pens. Even short term exposure to jellyfish can be extremely harmful within fish farm enclosures. In the case of farmed salmon, exposure to jellyfish was correlated with potentially fatal gill damage.

=== Industry ===
Power plants are often built on coasts and draw seawater for industrial cooling water. Jellyfish can clog the water intakes of power plants, which can decrease energy production or cause shutdowns. While total shutdown due to jellyfish clogging is uncommon, revenue losses can be significant. In some estimates, revenue losses are up to 5.5 million Indian rupees (US$78,000) per day during a shutdown. Not all clogs lead to shutdowns, though even minor intake perturbations can result in lost revenue. Some measures are available to prevent jellyfish-related interruptions. Power plants in Japan use bubble-curtain devices which produce air bubbles near intake valves which lift the jellyfish, reducing the number that are sucked into the pumps.

=== Tourism ===
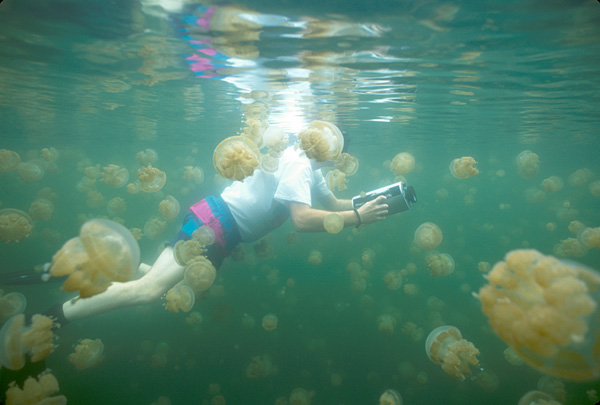
A diver swimming among jellyfish.

In coastal areas where tourism is ubiquitous, jellyfish blooms often present a risk to recreational activities due to beach closures and stinging swimmers. During blooms, the incidence of jellyfish stings becomes much more common. In parts of the Mediterranean Sea the problem has been very pronounced. For example, in the Italian peninsula of Salento, there were 1,733 sting incidents requiring medical attention between 2007 and 2011, costing the health services approximately €400,000. Stings were more commonly reported when wind conditions were blowing perpendicular to shore, which generally brought jellyfish into closer proximity with tourists.

Though stings and beach closures may affect tourism, attitudes about the presence of jellyfish may not affect behavior. A study surveying beach goers in Israel found that only between 3–10% said jellyfish blooms would be a factor causing them to cancel a beach trip. Attitudes differed between hypothetical and actual blooms. People were more likely to say they would avoid the beach before an outbreak, yet during outbreaks respondents were about twice as likely to say they would enter the water regardless. This suggests that jellyfish blooms are in some cases more of an inconvenience to recreation than a significant hindrance. Still, models predict that persistent annual jellyfish blooms could contribute to 1.8–6.2 million € tourism losses annually.

Scientific articles that support abnormal jellyfish blooms are more attractive to mainstream media, causing a dramatization of jellyfish bloom events in the public eye. This disproportionate coverage of bloom events changes public perception about the presence of jellyfish, which could lead to the impacts on tourism.

== Historical records ==
=== Paleontological ===
Various types of jellyfish population booms have been recorded in fossil evidence as early as 540 million years ago during the Early Cambrian Period. Other evidence was found dating back to the Middle to Late Cambrian Period (520–540 mya) and the Neogene Period (20–30 mya). The soft-bodied anatomy of jellyfish makes fossilization rare, which provides challenges to recreate the historical abundances of blooms. Most preserved jellyfish bloom fossils are from the Cambrian period likely due to the abundance of marine life and lack of terrestrial scavengers during this time.

=== Modern ===
Global data on jellyfish populations span between 1940 and 2011 and indicate that global jellyfish populations oscillate, reaching periodic maximums every 20 years. However, there appears to be a small linear increase in jellyfish abundances beginning in the 1970s. Jellyfish blooms have increased notably in Japan, the North Atlantic Shelf, Denmark, the Mediterranean Sea, and the Barents Sea. However, there are also several examples where jellyfish populations are decreasing in areas that are heavily impacted by humans.

It is difficult to discern how jellyfish blooms will be affected by changing environmental conditions. Some studies indicate that changes in climate alter the phenology of jellyfish, causing temporal shifts in bloom events. Much research in the future will also investigate the impacts of short and long term environmental and climatic pressures on jellyfish abundances.

=== Data collection challenges ===
Challenges in discerning jellyfish bloom trends partially arise from the lack of long-term data sets. This lack of data also inhibits researchers' abilities to distinguish between jellyfish bloom oscillations caused by natural versus anthropogenic impacts. One review demonstrated that there were increasing trends of jellyfish abundances in 28 out of the 45 Large Marine Ecosystems globally. However, the review notes the limitations of their analyses, given substantial time series data is unavailable. Other studies refute the idea that global jellyfish populations are increasing at all; they state that these variations are simply part of the larger-scale climatic and ecosystem processes. The lack of data has been interpreted as a lack of blooms.

An additional difficulty with studying jellyfish bloom dynamics is understanding how populations change in both the polyp and medusae life stages of a jellyfish. Medusae are much easier for researchers to track and observe due to their size and presence in the water. However, the ecology of the polyp life stage is not well understood in most jellyfish species. Many polyps are difficult to sample due to their fragility. There have been calls for future research to focus on the ecology of both the medusae and the polyp life stages to better understand bloom dynamics throughout the organisms' entire lifespans.

== See also ==
- Jelly falls
- Fishing down the food web
