= Chrysaor =

Ancient Greek mythological figure

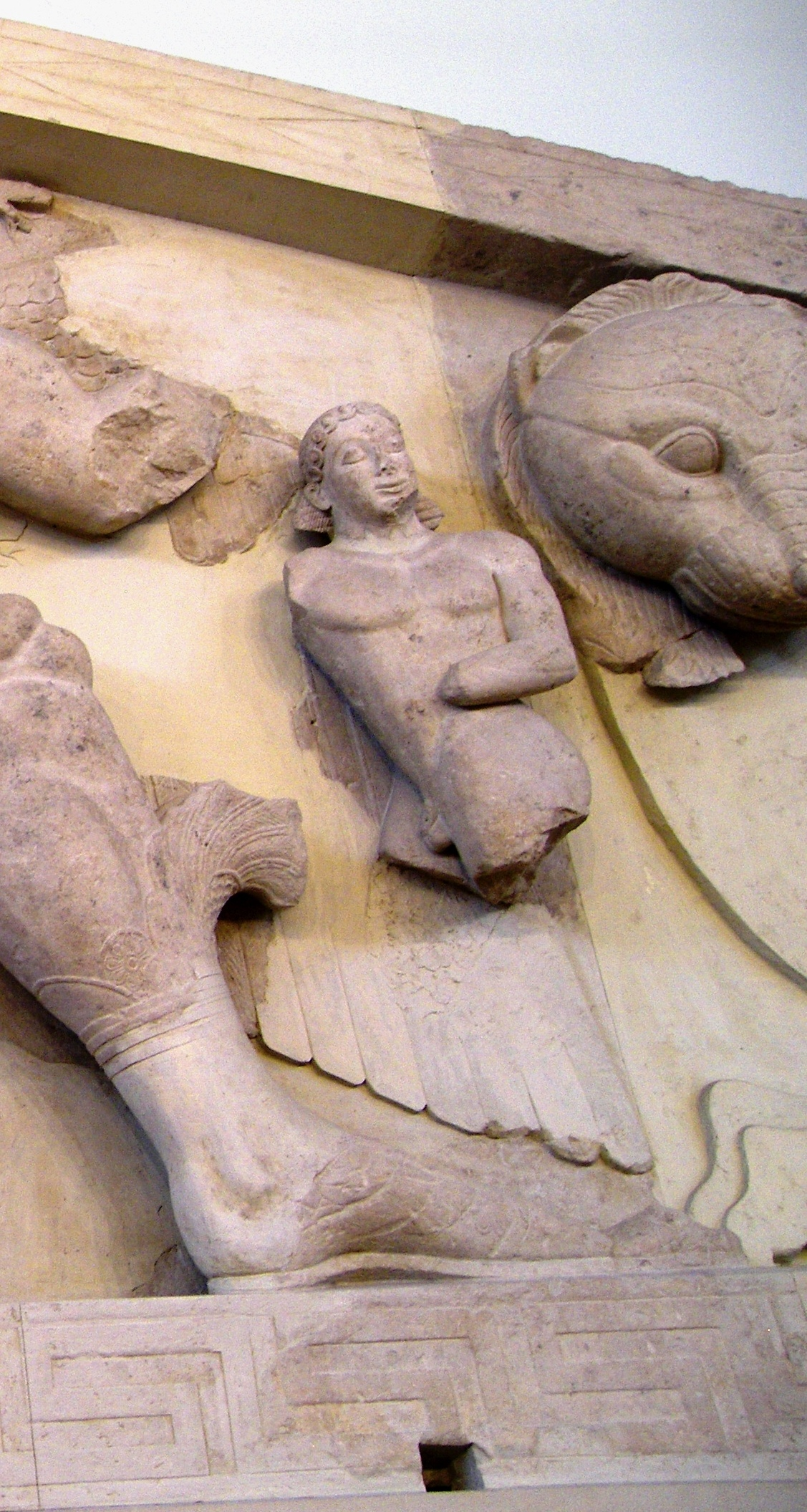
- Chrysaor, son of the Gorgon at the pediment of the Temple of Artemis in Corfu

Genealogy
- Parents: Poseidon and Medusa
- Siblings: Pegasus and several paternal half-siblings
- Consort: Callirrhoe
- Children: Geryon and Echidna

In Greek mythology, Chrysaor (Ancient Greek: Χρυσάωρ, gen. Χρυσάορος, romanized: Khrusáōr, lit. 'he who has a golden sword') was the brother of the winged horse Pegasus, often depicted as a young man, the son of Poseidon and Medusa, born when Perseus decapitated the Gorgon Medusa.

And when Perseus cut off her head, there sprang forth great Chrysaor and the horse Pegasus who is so called because he was born near the springs of Ocean; and that other, because he held a golden blade in his hands.

— Hesiod, Theogony

== Mythology ==
In Greek mythology, Medusa was one of the Gorgons, three monstrous siblings. Medusa, unlike her sisters Stheno and Euryale, was mortal, and was beheaded by Perseus. Chrysaor and Pegasus sprang from the blood of her decapitated body.

In art, Chrysaor's earliest appearance seems to be on the great pediment of the Temple of Artemis, Corfu dated to the early 6th century BCE, where he is shown beside his mother, Medusa.

== Offspring ==
Chrysaor, married to Callirrhoe, daughter of glorious Oceanus, was father to the triple-headed Geryon, but Geryon was killed by the great strength of Heracles at sea-circled Erytheis beside his own shambling cattle on that day when Heracles drove those broad-faced cattle toward holy Tiryns, when he crossed the stream of Oceanus and had killed Orthos and the oxherd Eurytion out in the gloomy meadow beyond fabulous Oceanus.

— Hesiod, Theogony

Chrysaor and Callirrhoe could have also been the parents of Echidna. (Note: H.J. Rose says simply that it is "not clear which parents are meant"; Athanassakis (2004) says that Phorcys and Ceto are the "more likely candidates for parents of this hideous creature who proceeded to give birth to a series of monsters and scourges". The problem arises from the ambiguous referent of the pronoun "she" in line 295 of the Theogony. While some have read this "she" as referring to Callirhoe (e.g. Smith (1873), Morford, p. 162). According to Clay (2003) "the modern scholarly consensus" reads Ceto, see for example Gantz, p. 22; Caldwell, pp. 7, 46, 295–303; Grimal, "Echidna" p. 143.)

In an alternate genealogy from Stephanus of Byzantium's Ethnica, Chrysaor is a son of Glaucus and grandson of Sisyphus, and his son Mylasus goes on to found Mylasa. This ancestry would make Chrysaor a double of Bellerophon.
