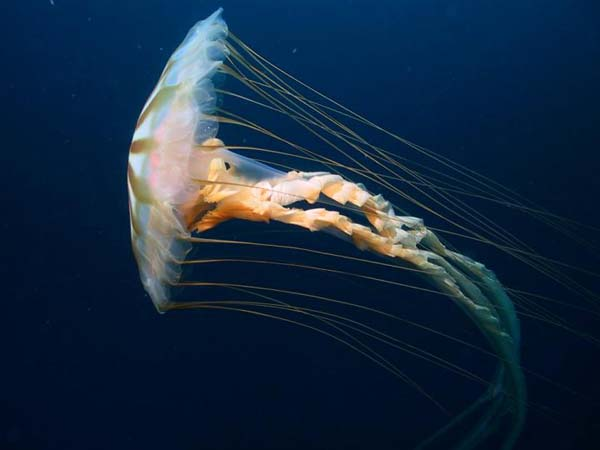
- Chrysaora melanaster.

Scientific classification
- Kingdom: Animalia
- Phylum: Cnidaria
- Class: Scyphozoa
- Order: Semaeostomeae
- Family: Pelagiidae; Gegenbaur, 1856

Genera
- See text

= Pelagiidae =

Family of jellyfishes

The Pelagiidae are a family of jellyfish. Members of the family Pelagiidae have no ring canal, and the marginal tentacles arise from umbrella margin.

== Genera ==
There are four genera currently recognized:

- Genus Chrysaora – (14 species)
- Genus Mawia – Mawia benovici
- Genus Pelagia – Pelagia noctiluca
- Genus Sanderia – (2 species)
