= Goettel =

Goettel is a surname. Notable people with the surname include:

- Dwayne Goettel (1964–1995), Canadian electronic musician
- Gerard Louis Goettel (1928–2011), American judge
- Philip Goettel (1840–1920), American Civil War veteran

== See also ==
- Gettel
- Goette
