= Kagoshima Aquarium =

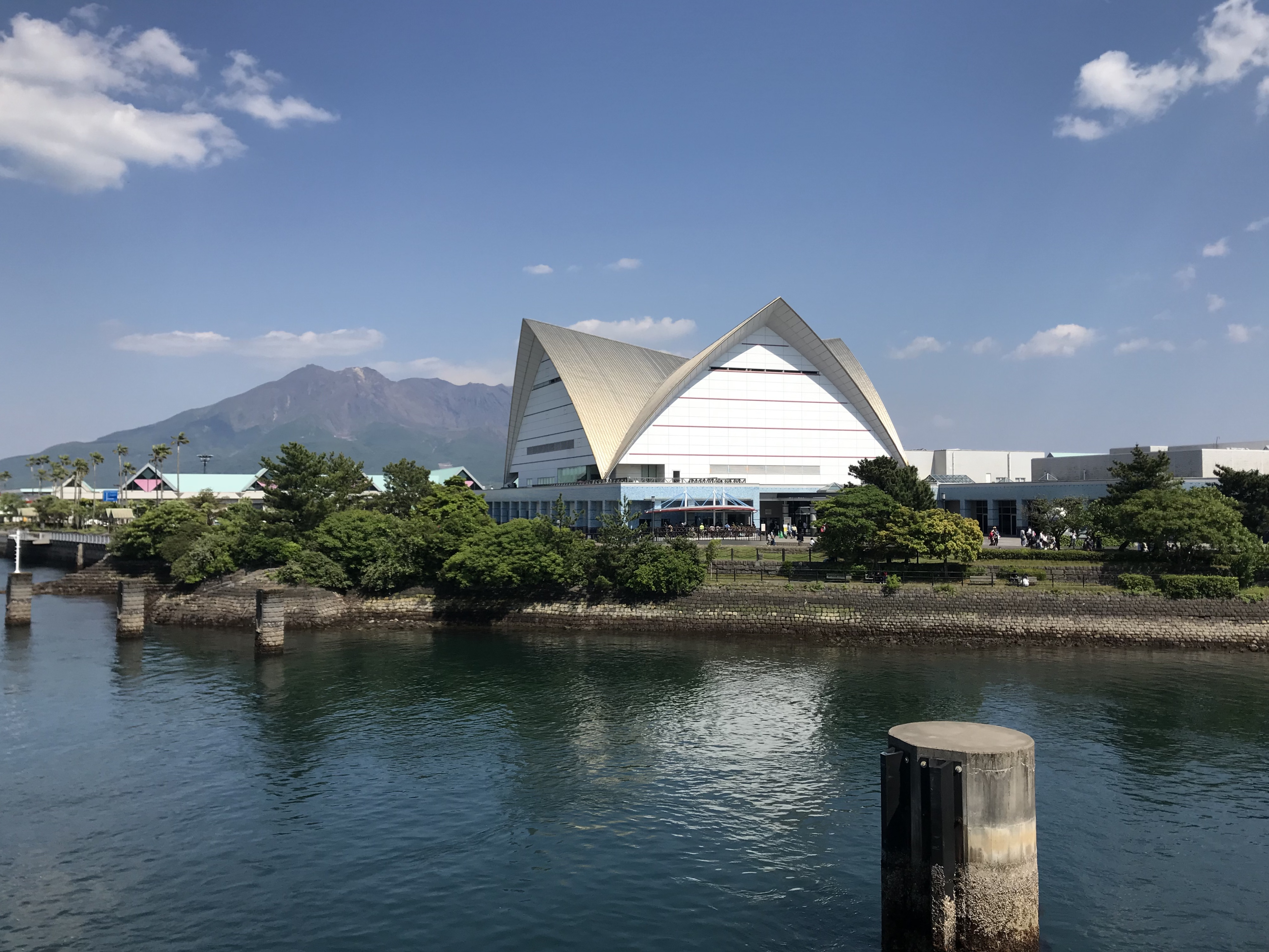
- Kagoshima Aquarium
- Interactive map of Kagoshima Aquarium
- 31.5959°N 130.5646°E
- Date opened: May 30, 1997
- Location: Kagoshima, Kagoshima Prefecture, Japan
- Land area: 13,163 m^{2} (141,690 sq ft)
- Volume of largest tank: 1,500,000 litres (396,000 US gal)
- Total volume of tanks: 3,200,000 litres (845,000 US gal)
- Memberships: JAZA
- Public transit: Kagoshima City Transportation Bureau
- Website: ioworld.jp/%20Official%20Site

Kagoshima Aquarium (Japanese: かごしま水族館, Kagoshima Suizokukan) is a public aquarium, located in Kagoshima, Japan. It is a member of the Japanese Association of Zoos and Aquariums (JAZA).

== History ==
Kagoshima Aquarium opened on May 30, 1997, and exhibits marine life from the Kagoshima coast, which is washed by Kuroshio, and Kagoshima Bay. Brackish water and river life are also exhibited. Some of the aquarium's most popular attractions are the whale sharks and lamellibrachia satsuma. The Japanese name "Io" means fish in Kagoshima dialect.

In total, it cost approximately 12.7 billion yen to build the aquarium. The appearance of the aquarium is based on a stingray. Kagoshima Aquarium was the first aquarium in Japan to successfully breed Chinese sturgeons in captivity. In October 2011, the number of visitors reached ten million. At the end of the route is the "Sea of Silence", conceived by the aquarium's first director. Fish and other marine life are not exhibited inside this tank and is filled only with water. It has been said that this is to make people think about the marine environment.

== Exhibits ==
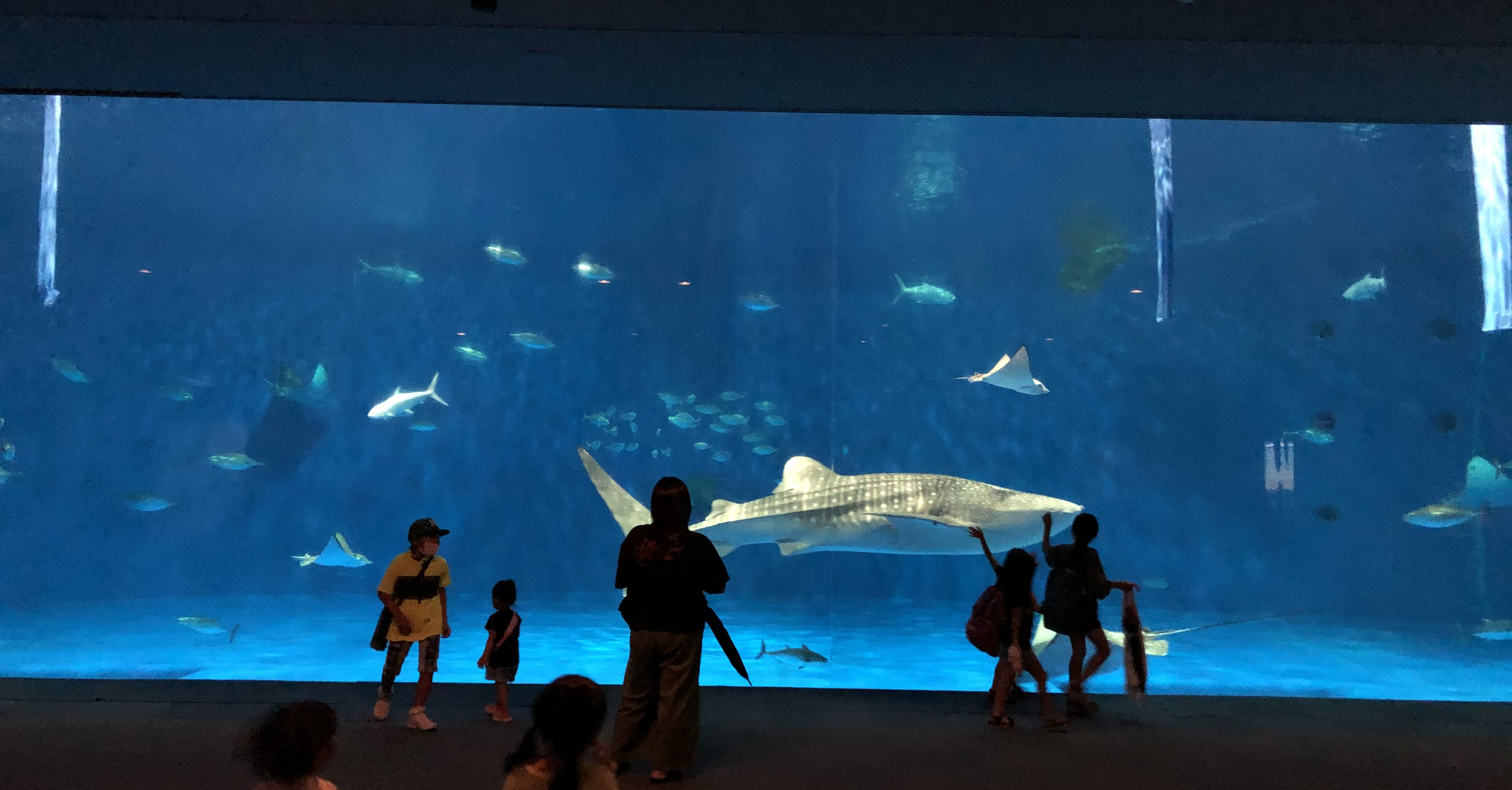
Whale Sharks

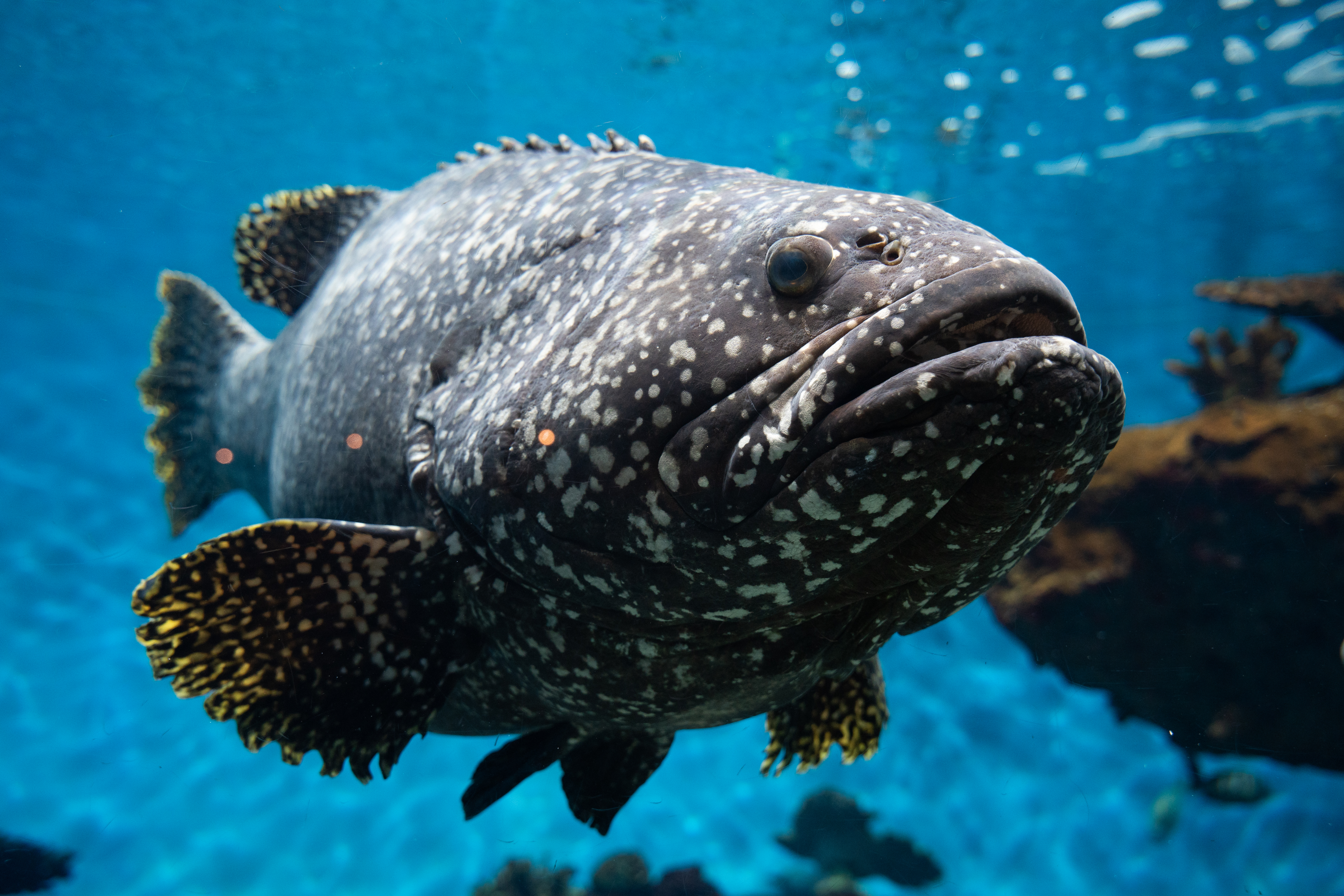
Giant Grouper

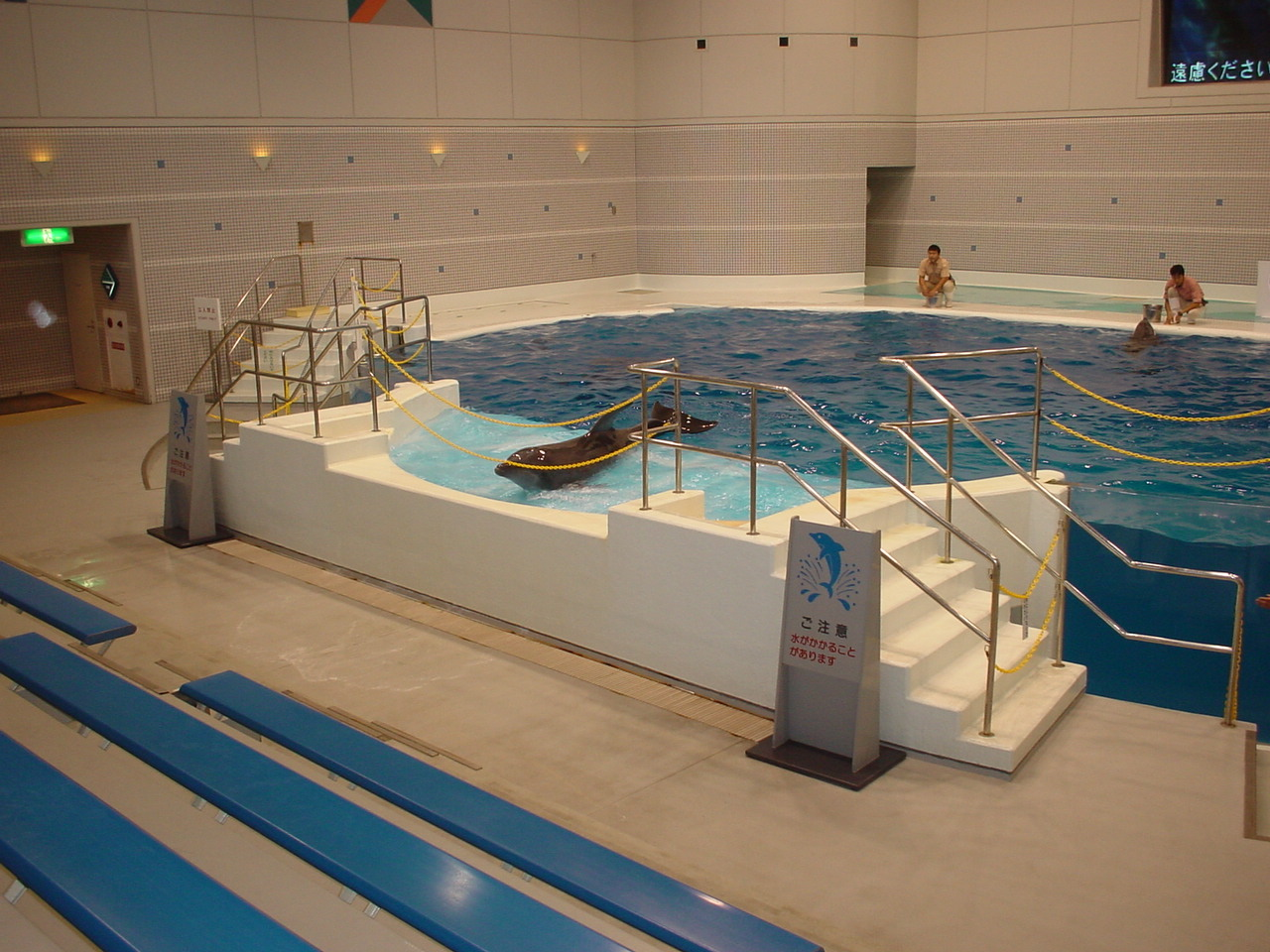
Dolphin pool

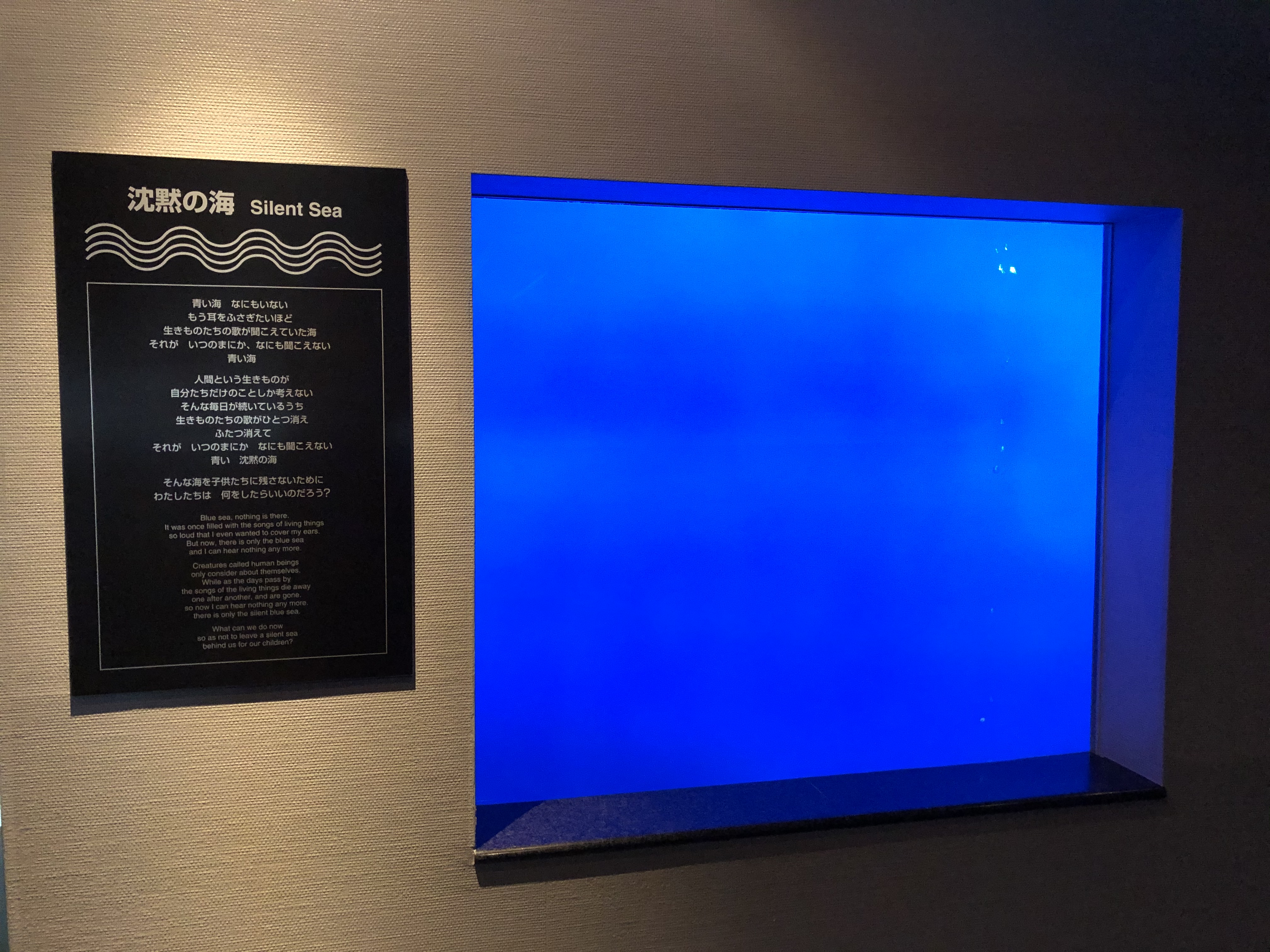
Silent sea

The aquarium has five floors, from the basement to the fifth floor, and guests can walk along the route to see it.

- Kuroshio Large Aquarium - Whale Sharks, mud skates, spotted eagle rays, Chinese sturgeons, bluefin tuna, milkfish
- Nansei Islands Sea - Giant grouper, damselfish, butterflyfish, spotted garden eels, corals, feather stars
- Sea of Kagoshima - Spider crabs, moray eels, spiny lobsters, flounders, banded coral shrimps, sardines, bullhead sharks
- Observation Hall - The skeleton of a tropical bottlenose whale. Guests can see Sakurajima on the opposite bank in front.
- Lamellibrachia satsuma corner
- Seaweed and Fish - An aquarium that reproduces the environment of a coastal Kelp forest.
- Freshwater Aquarium - Vallisneria asiatica, oryzias, Yamato shrimps, freshwater shrimps, etc.
- Life of jellyfish - Moon jellyfish, spotted jellyfish
- Theater room
- Cafeteria
- Giant mottled eel Aquarium /Arapaima Aquarium - Giant mottled eels, flagtails
- Mangrove Aquarium - Jarbua terapon, mudskippers
- Seal Aquarium - Spotted seal
- Dolphin pool - Bottlenose dolphins
- Amusement shop
- Touch pool - Starfish, sea cucumbers
- Outdoor waterway - Ocean sunfish, mahi-mahi

=== Whale sharks ===
The Kagoshima Aquarium has a large tank with a water volume of 1,500,000 litres (396,000 US gal), but it is not large enough to house whale sharks that easily exceed 10 m (33 ft) when fully grown. Therefore, whale sharks kept at Kagoshima Aquarium are exhibited using the "Kagoshima method", in which training is conducted to return them to the wild before the body length reaches 5.8 m (19 ft). A transmitter is attached to the whale shark that returns to the wild, and the aquarium has been successful in grasping the migration route of the whale shark.。

The whale sharks raised in the Kuroshio Tank have been named "Yuyu" for generations, and are among the aquarium's most popular attractions.

- First generation (male)
  October 20, 2000: Captured with a set net off the coast of Takayama Town (currently Kimotsuki Town). Body length 4.25 m (13.9 ft).
  November 22, 2000: Exhibited in the Kuroshio tank.
  July 24, 2002: Moved from the Kuroshio Tank to a marine cage in Kasasa Town, Kagoshima Prefecture (currently Minamisatsuma City). A little over 5 m (16 ft) in length.
  Released on August 1, 2002.
- Second generation (male)
  June 17, 2002: Captured with a fixed net in Kagoshima Prefecture Kasasa Town (currently Minamisatsuma City). Body length 3.8 m (12 ft).
  July 24, 2002: Exhibited in the Kuroshio Tank.
  July 28, 2005: Moved from the Kuroshio Tank to the marine cage in Kasasa Town, Kagoshima Prefecture. Body length over 5.4 m (18 ft).
  Released off the coast of Cape Noma, Kasasa-cho on August 8, 2005.
- Third generation (female)
  June 25, 2005: Kagoshima Prefecture Bonotsucho Akime Captured with a set net off the coast. Body length 4.4 m (14 ft).
  July 28, 2005: Exhibited in the Kuroshio Tank.
  July 21, 2007: Moved from the Large Kuroshio Tank to a marine cage in Minamisatsuma City, Kagoshima Prefecture. Body length less than 5.3 m (17 ft).
  Released off the coast of Kasasa, Minamisatsuma City on July 31, 2007.
- 4th generation (male)
  July 20, 2005: Captured with a set net in Kasasa Town, Kagoshima Prefecture. Body length 1.36 m (4.5 ft), weight 15.2 kg.
  July 21, 2005: Delivered to Kagoshima Aquarium.
  October 27, 2005: Exhibited under the nickname "Yuta" in the underwater tunnel part of the Kuroshio Tank, separated from the aquarium's other whale sharks.
  July 21, 2007: Exhibited as the 4th generation Yuyu. Body length 2.58 m (8.5 ft).
  August 4, 2009: Moved from the Kuroshio Tank to the marine cage in Minamisatsuma City, Kagoshima Prefecture. Body length 4.47 m (14.7 ft).
  August 5, 200:9 Found dead in a marine cage in Minamisatsuma City, Kagoshima Prefecture.
- Fifth generation (male)
  June 25, 2009: Captured with a fixed net in Kasasa-cho, Minamisatsuma City, Kagoshima Prefecture. Body length 3.8 m (12 ft).
  August 4, 2009: Exhibited in the Kuroshio tank.
  August 23, 2011: Moved from the Kuroshio Tank to the marine cage in Minamisatsuma City, Kagoshima Prefecture. Body length 5.1 m (17 ft).
  Released off the coast of Noma Cape, Minamisatsuma City on September 7, 2011. (Equipped with satellite transmitter)
- 6th generation (male)
  July 15, 2011: Captured with a set net of the Kaiei Fisheries Cooperative in Ibusuki City. Body length 3.7 m (12 ft).
  August 23, 2011: Exhibited in the Kuroshio tank.
  November 4, 2014: Moved from the Kuroshio Tank to a marine cage off the coast of Kataura Port, Kasasa-cho, Minamisatsuma City, Kagoshima Prefecture.
  November 9, 2014: Physical condition suddenly worsened, and later died.
- 7th generation (male)
  August 3, 2015: Captured with a set net of the Takayama Fisheries Cooperative in Kimotsuki Town. Body length 4 m (13 ft).
  August 23, 2015: Exhibited in the Kuroshio tank.

Two whale sharks were planned to be exhibited as a highlight from the aquarium's opening in 1997, but they died in March and May of the same year. As a result, the aquarium opened its doors without a whale shark.

=== Tropical bottlenose whale skeleton ===
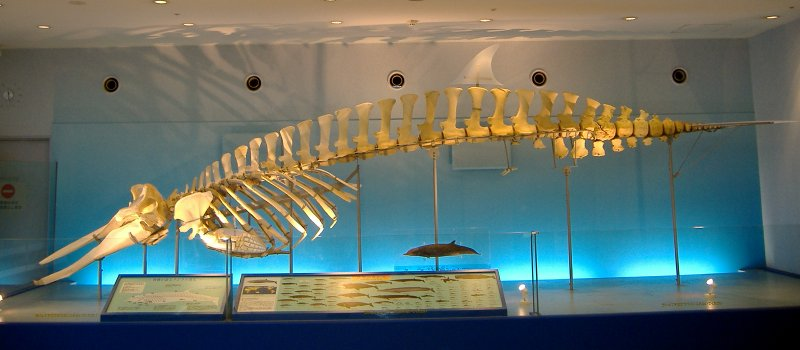
Tropical bottlenose whale skeleton

A whole-body skeletal specimen of a tropical bottlenose whale is displayed in the observation hall on the fifth floor. Tropical bottlenose whales are extremely rare in the wild, and it is rare to observe whole-body skeleton specimens.

This skeleton is a specimen of an individual that washed ashore in Satsumasendai City on July 26, 2002.

=== Jellyfish corridor ===
The jellyfish corridor opened in March 2017, and exhibits the world's first deep-sea inhabited sanderia malayensis.

=== Japanese wedgefish ===
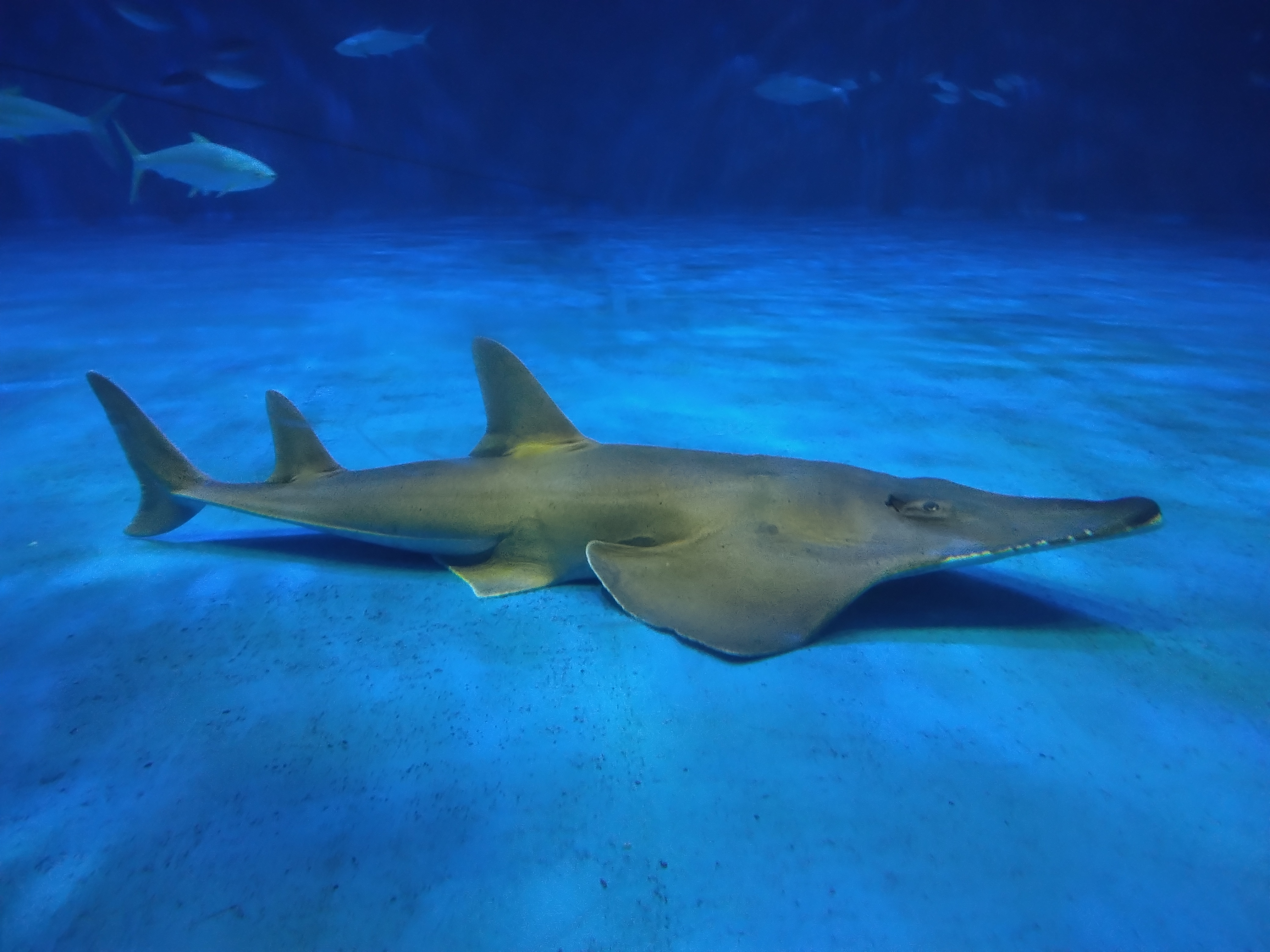
Japanese wedgefish

In 2020, research by groups such as Kuroshio Biological Research Institute revealed that the aquarium's giant guitarfish, housed at the aquarium since its opening, was, in fact, a new species, the Japanese wedgefish.

== Gallery ==
Exterior

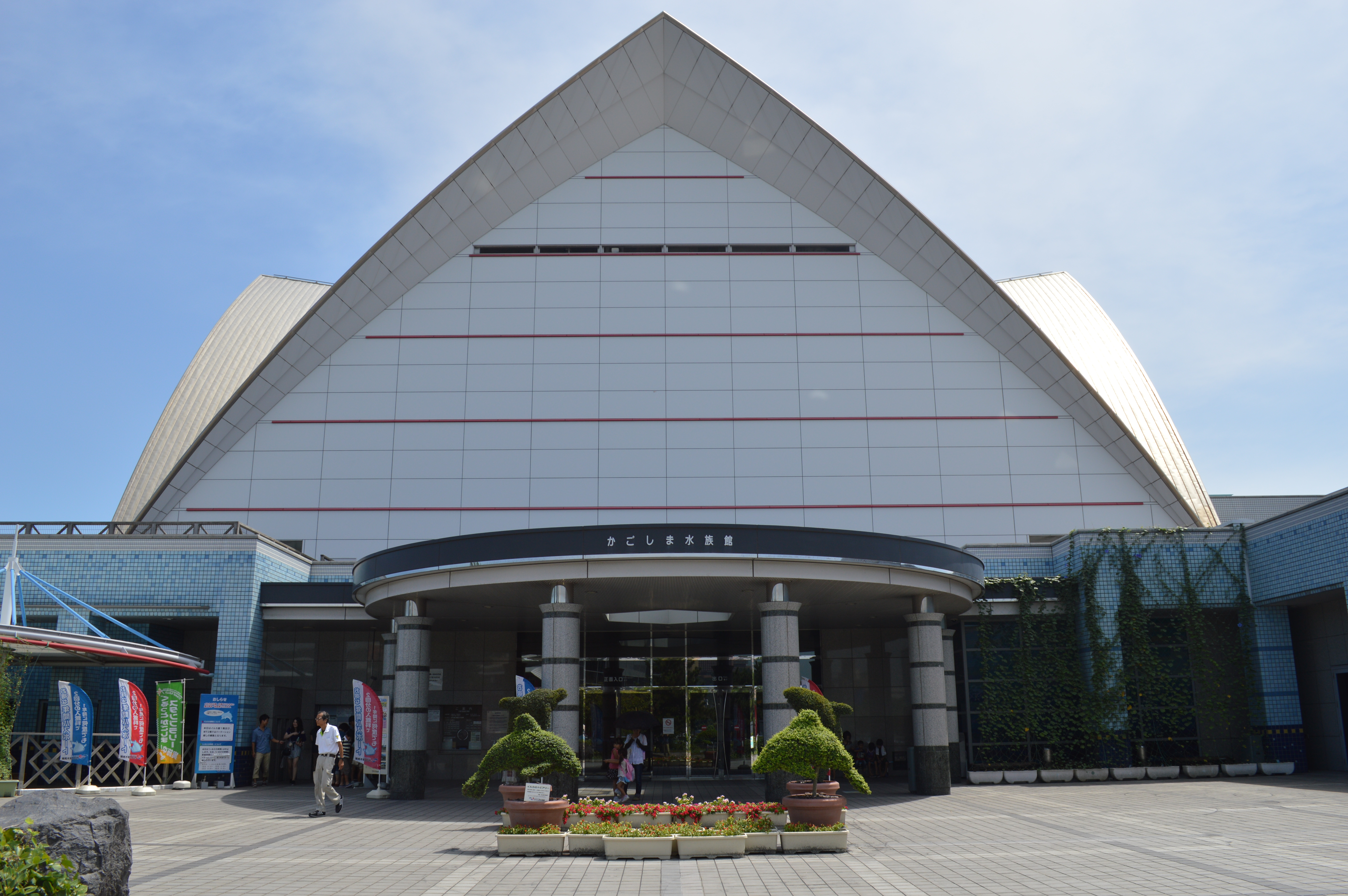

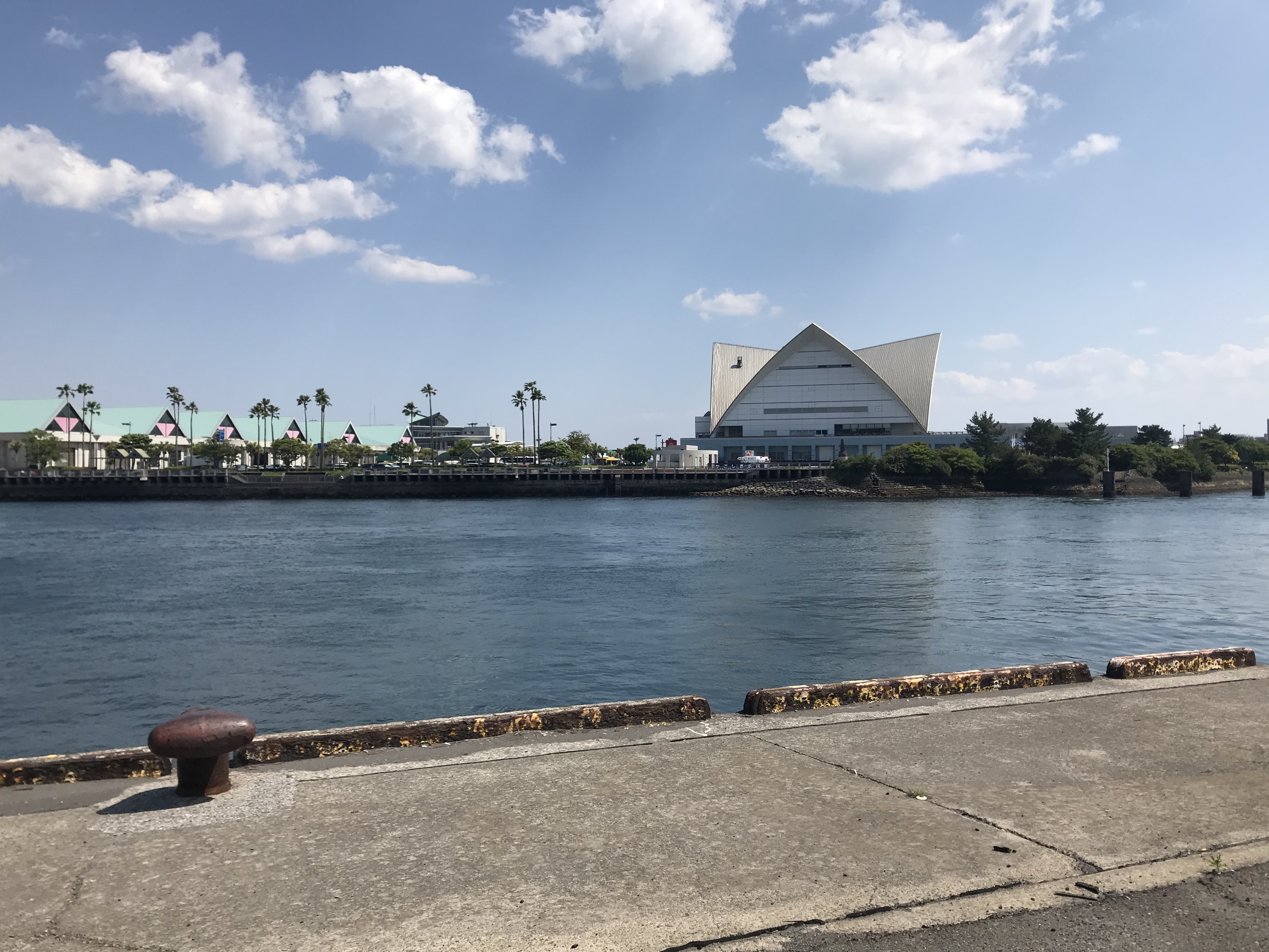

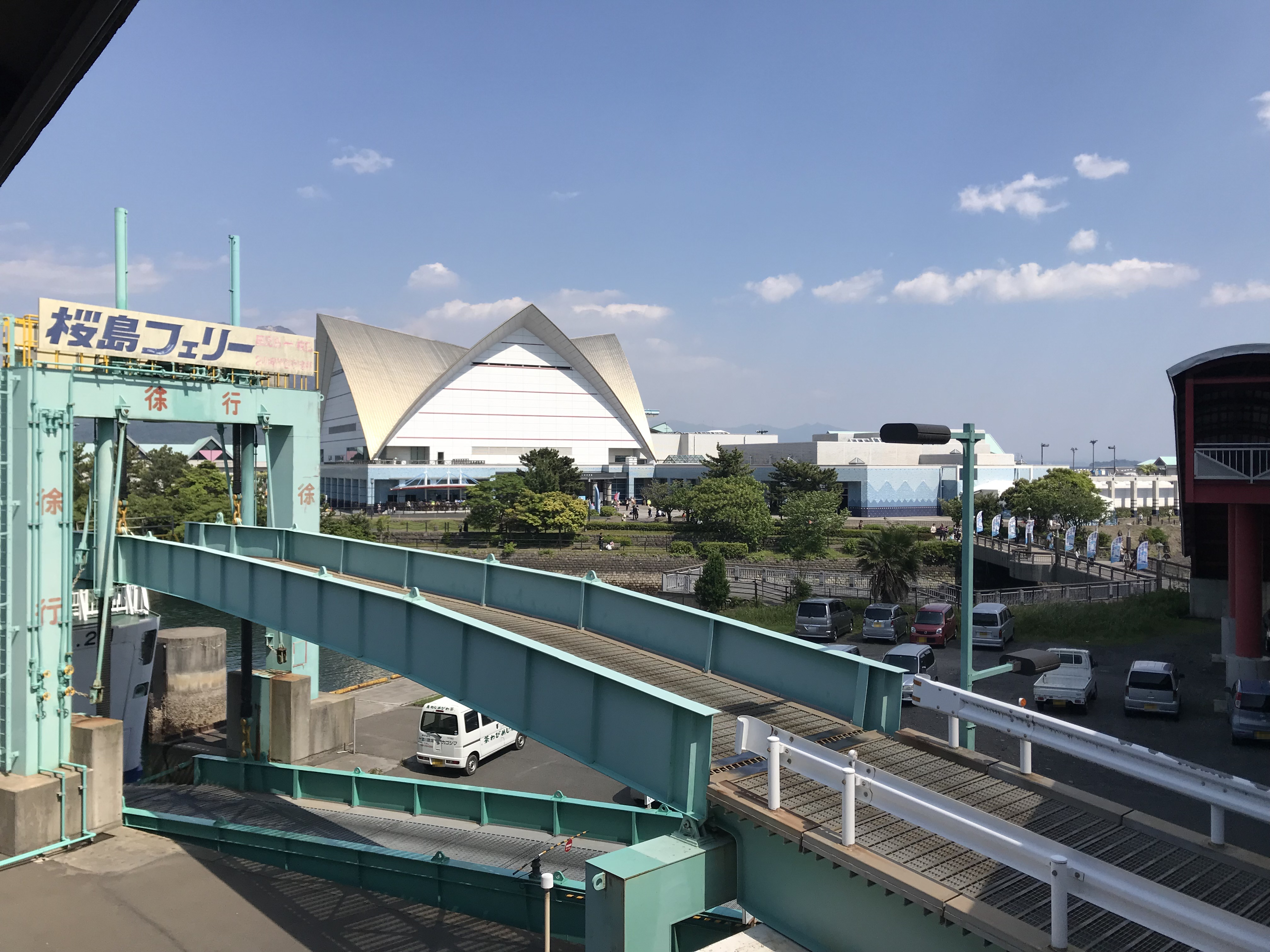

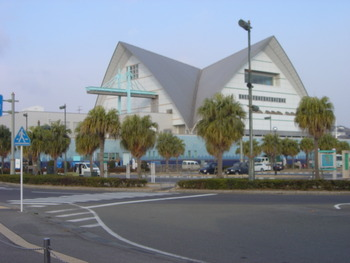

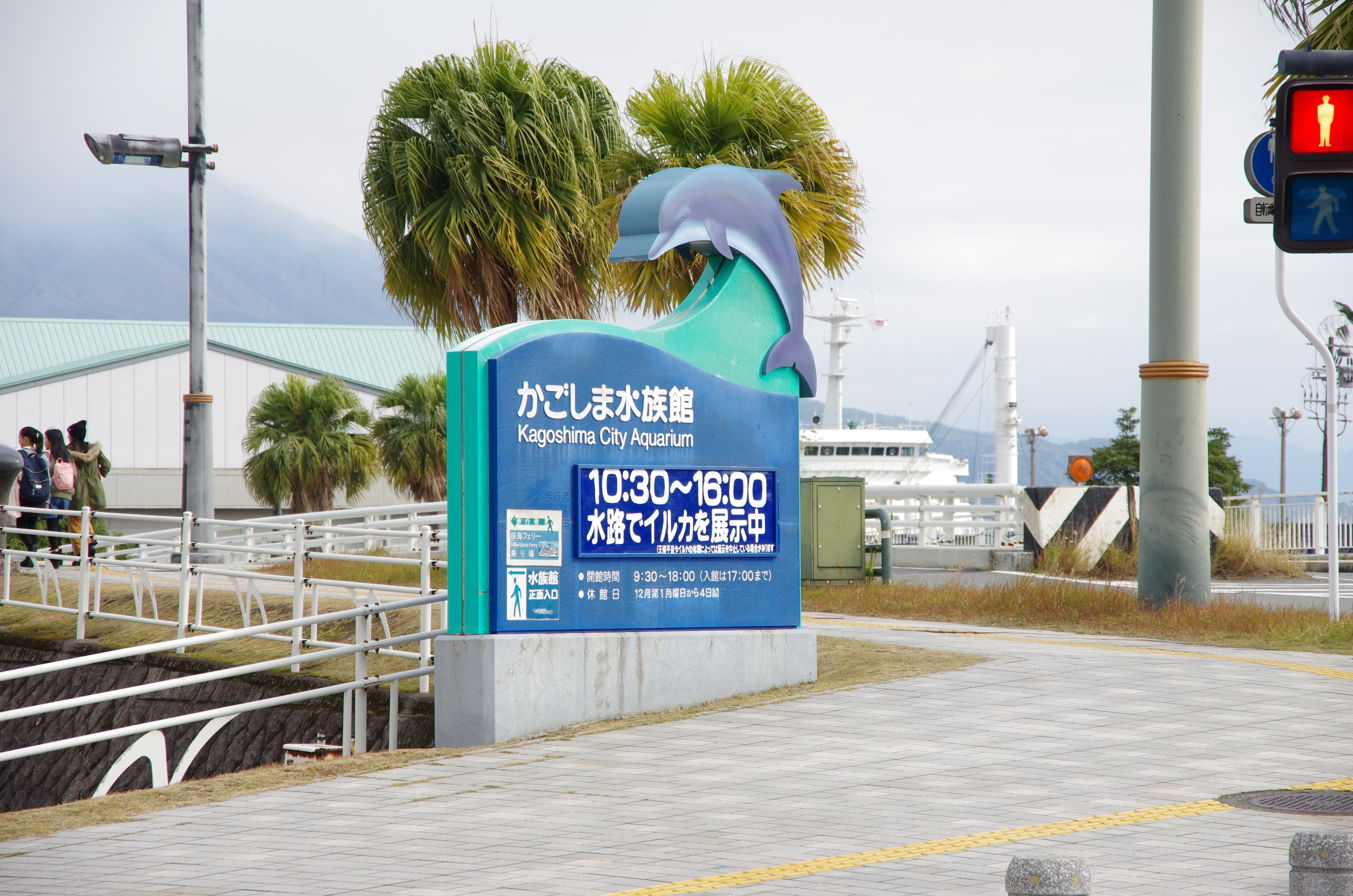

Aquarium

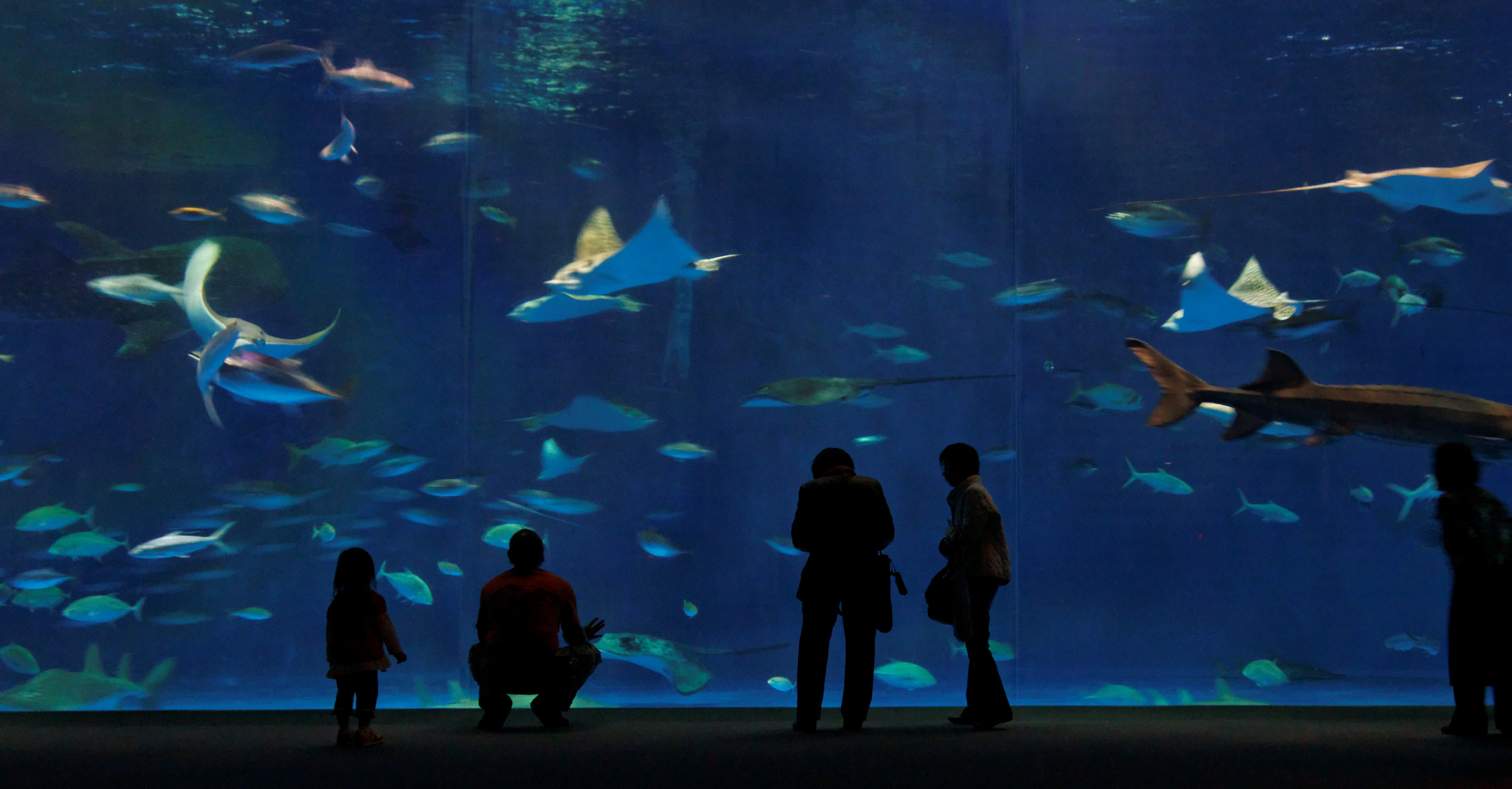

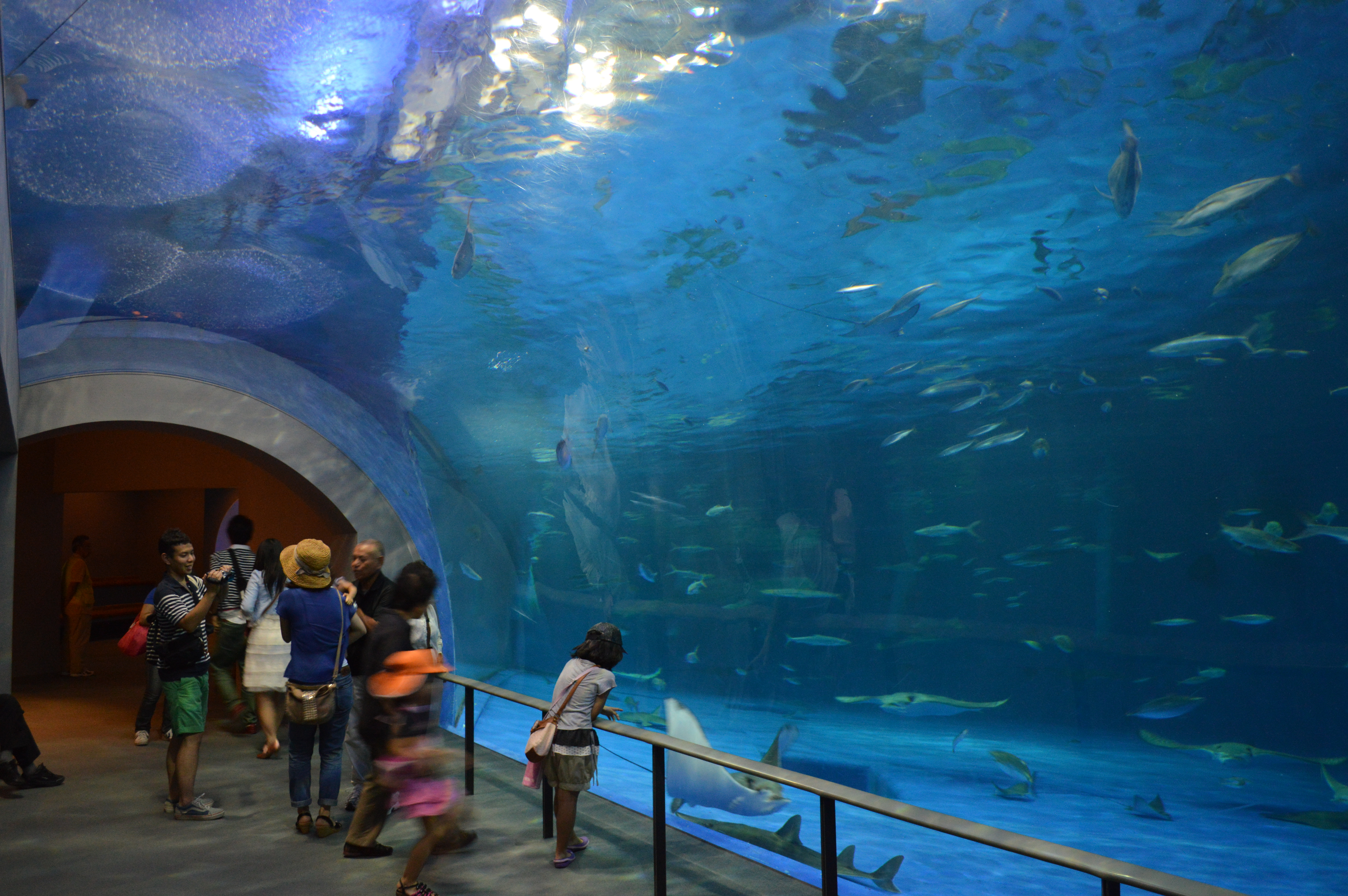

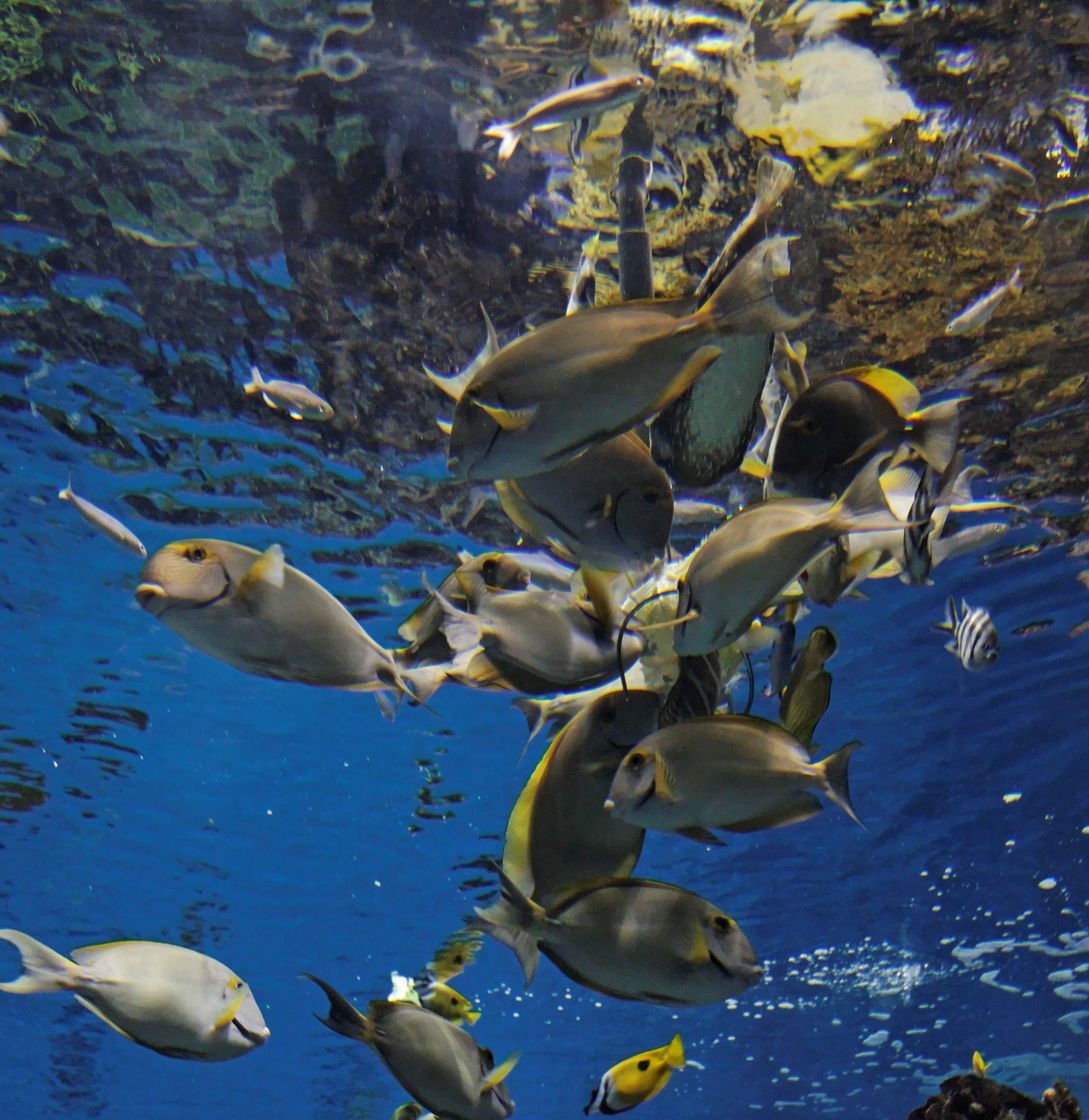

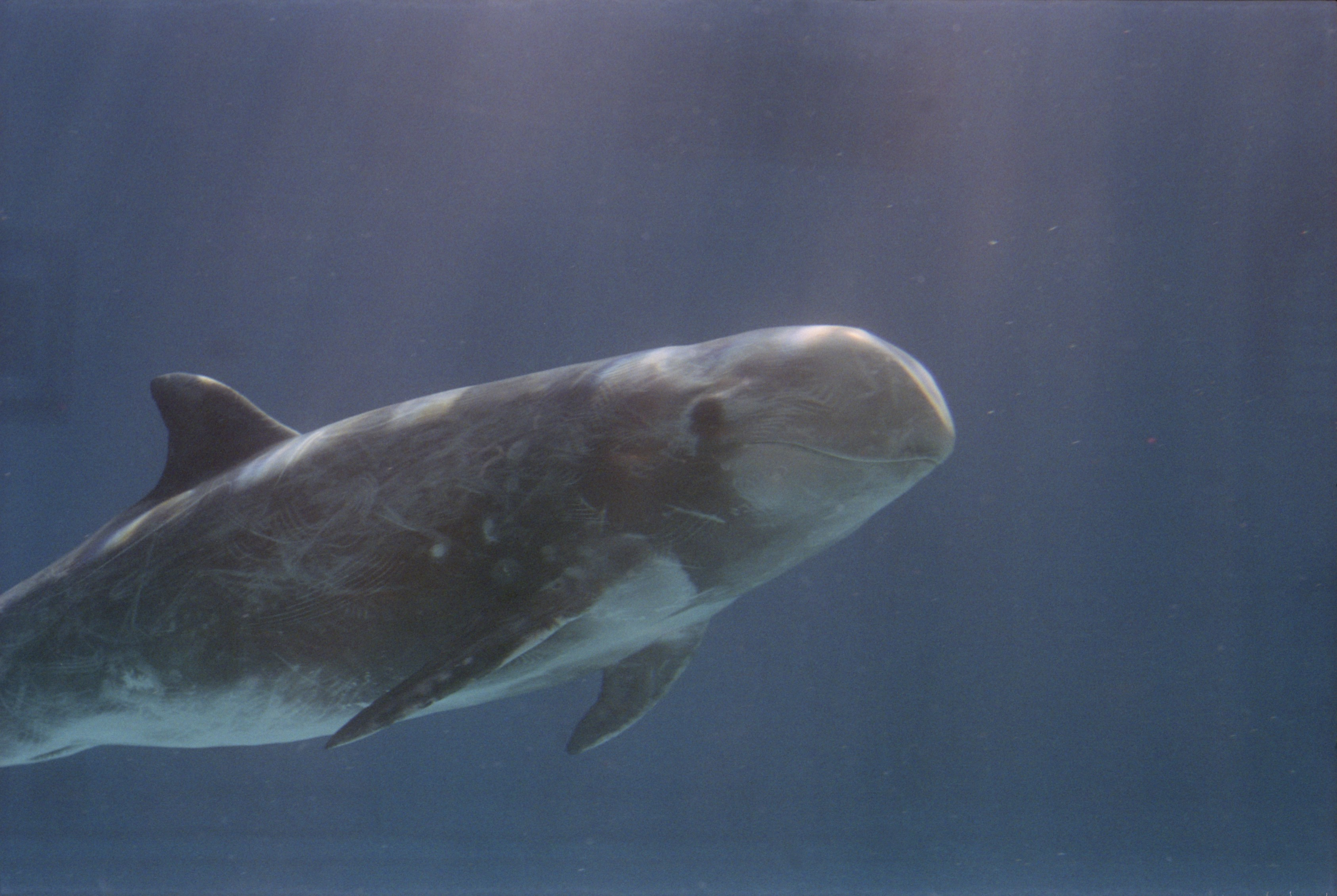

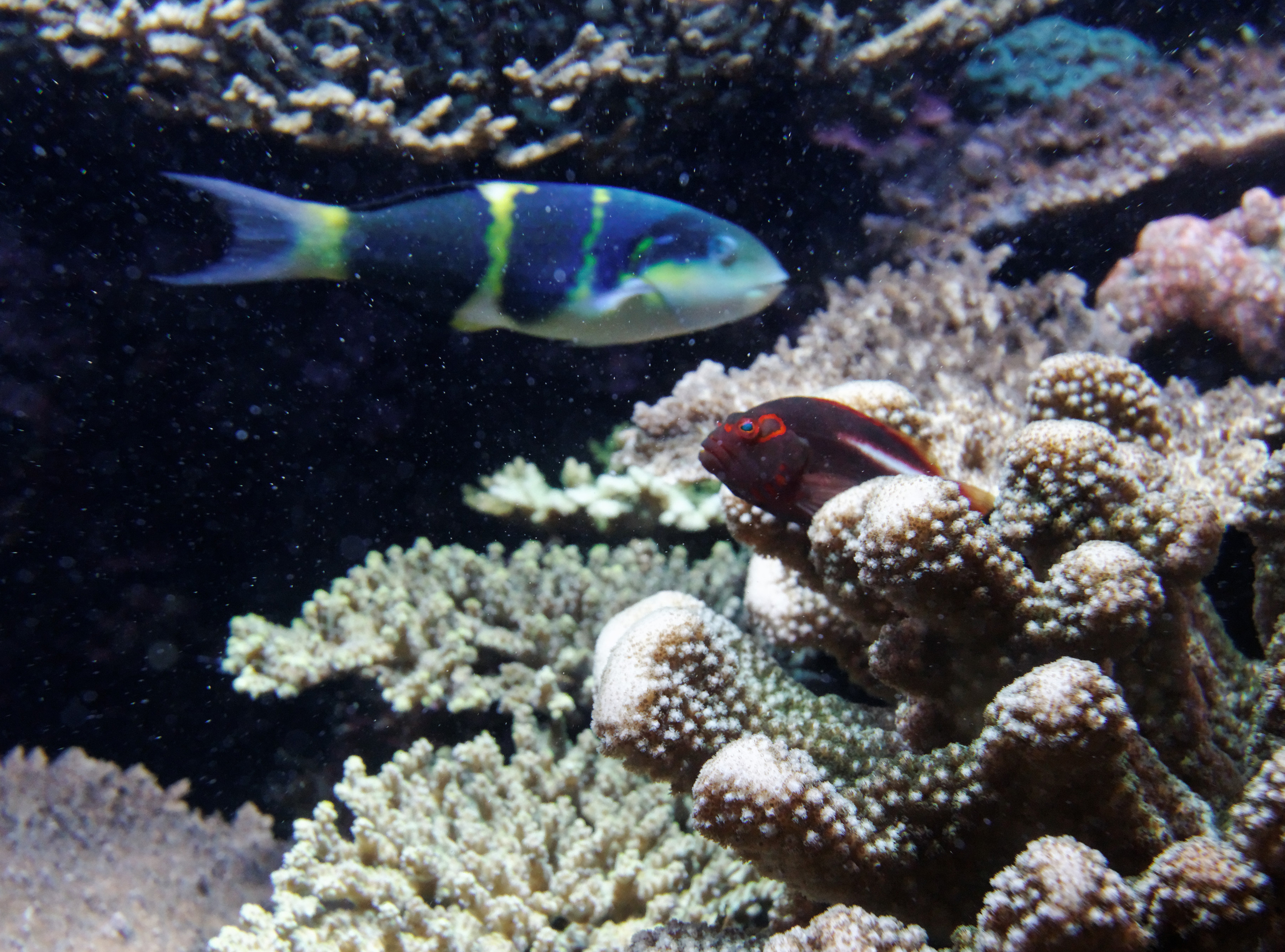

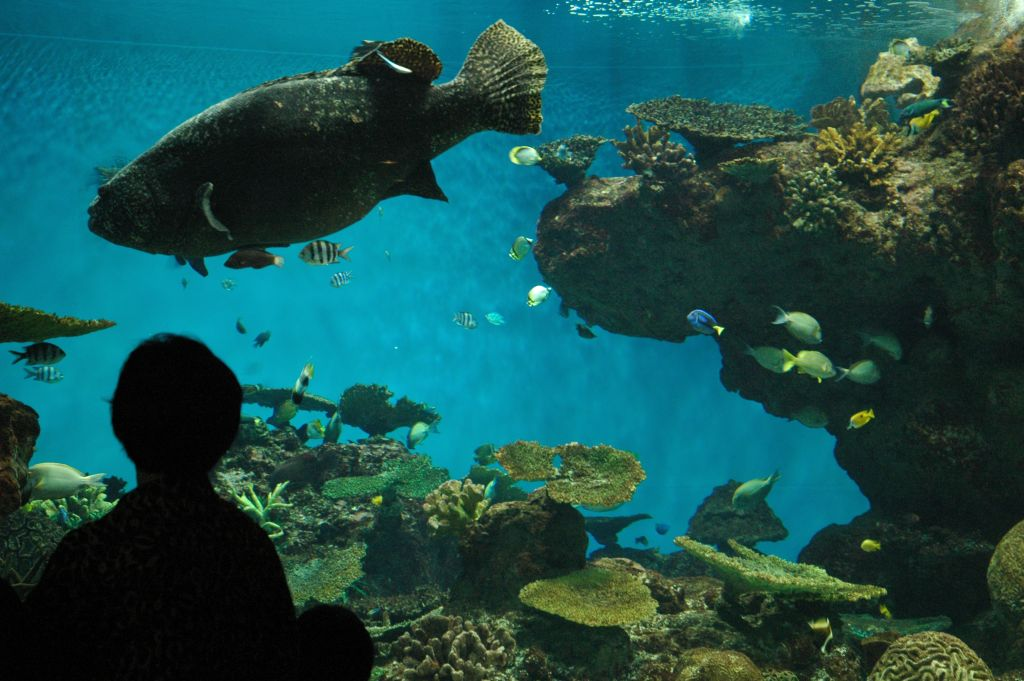

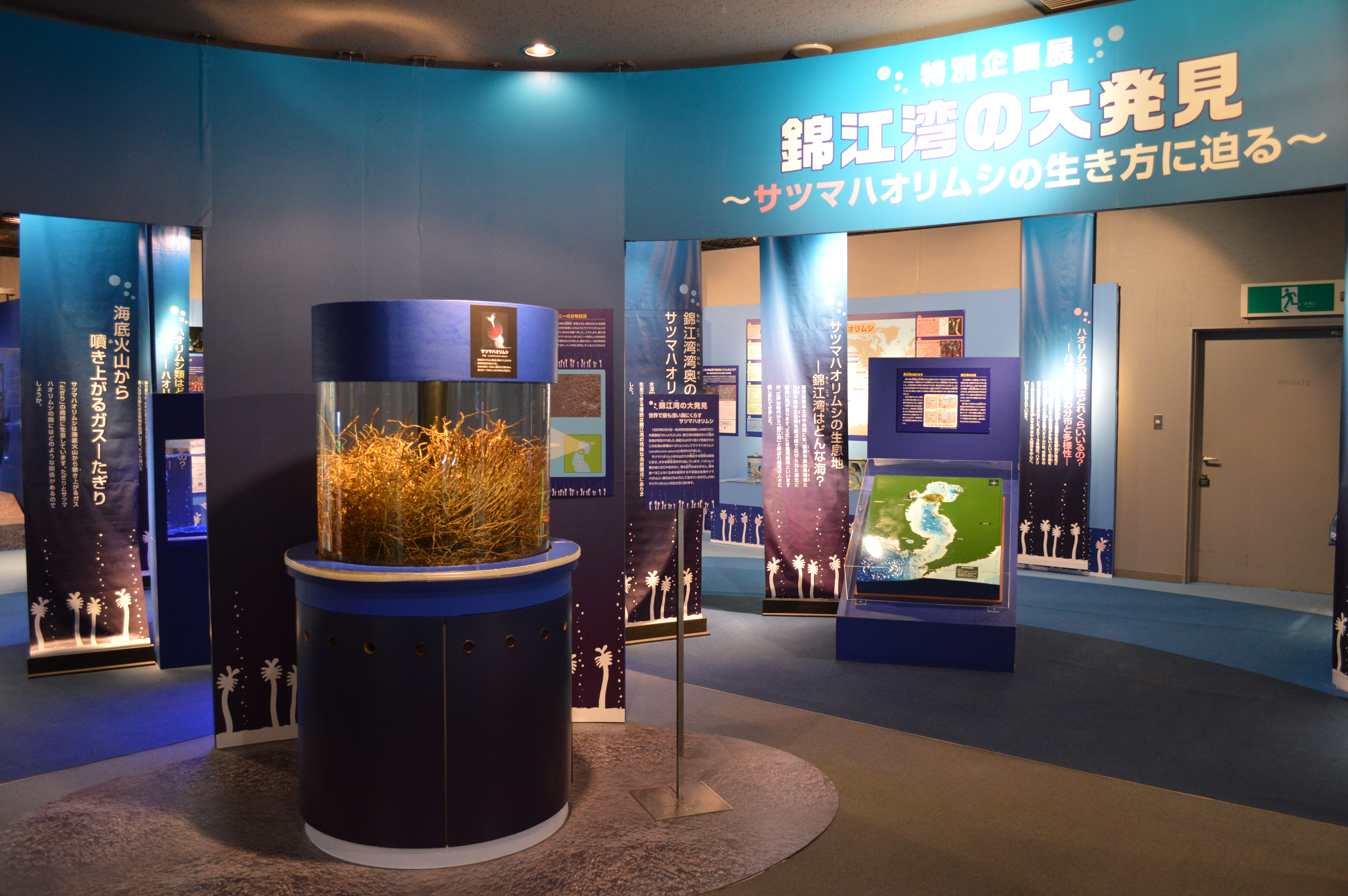

Dolphin pool

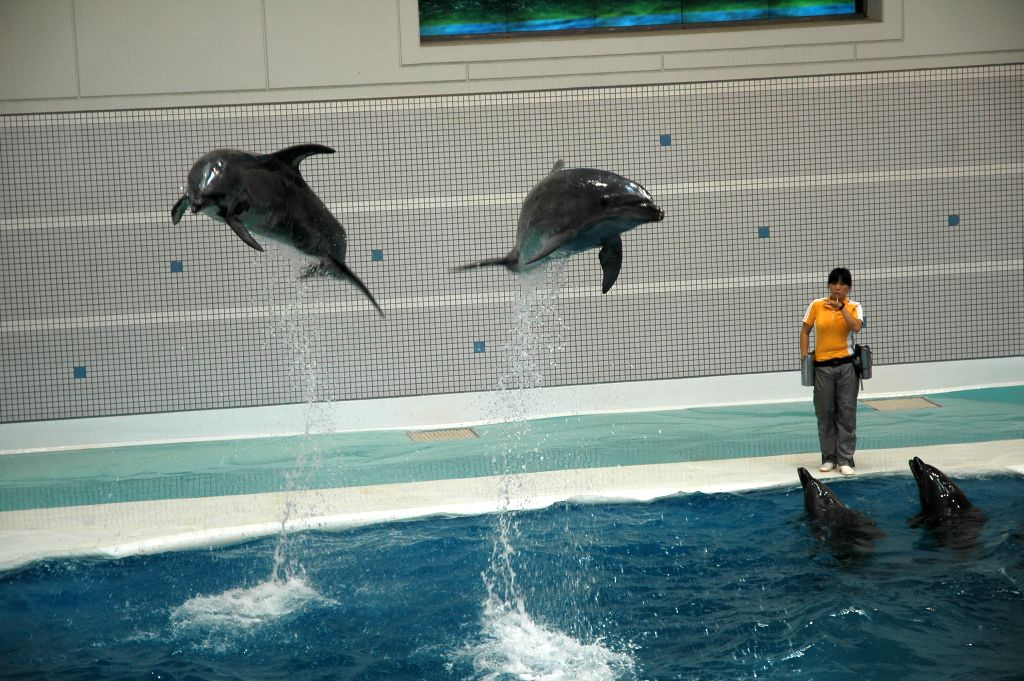

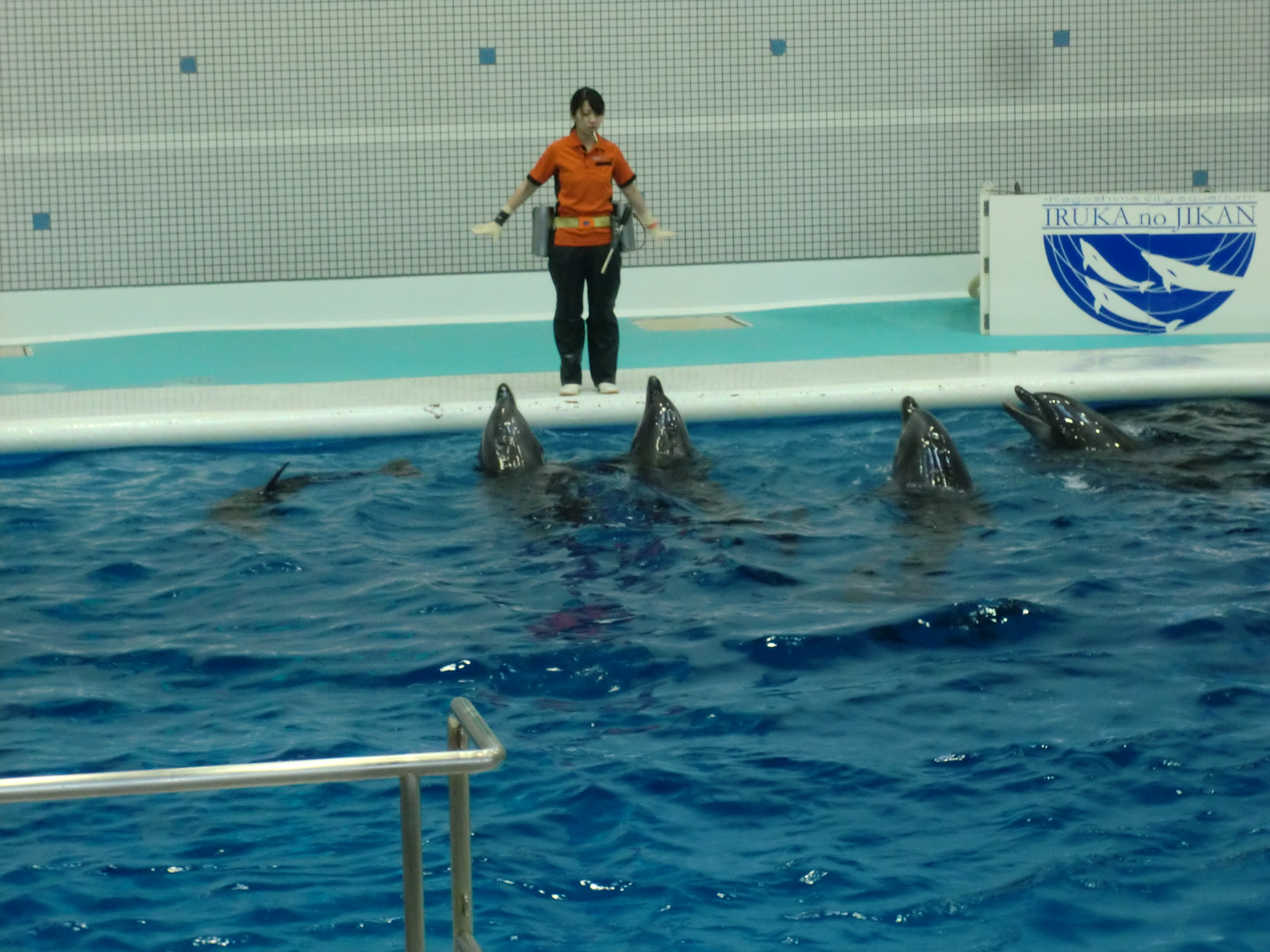

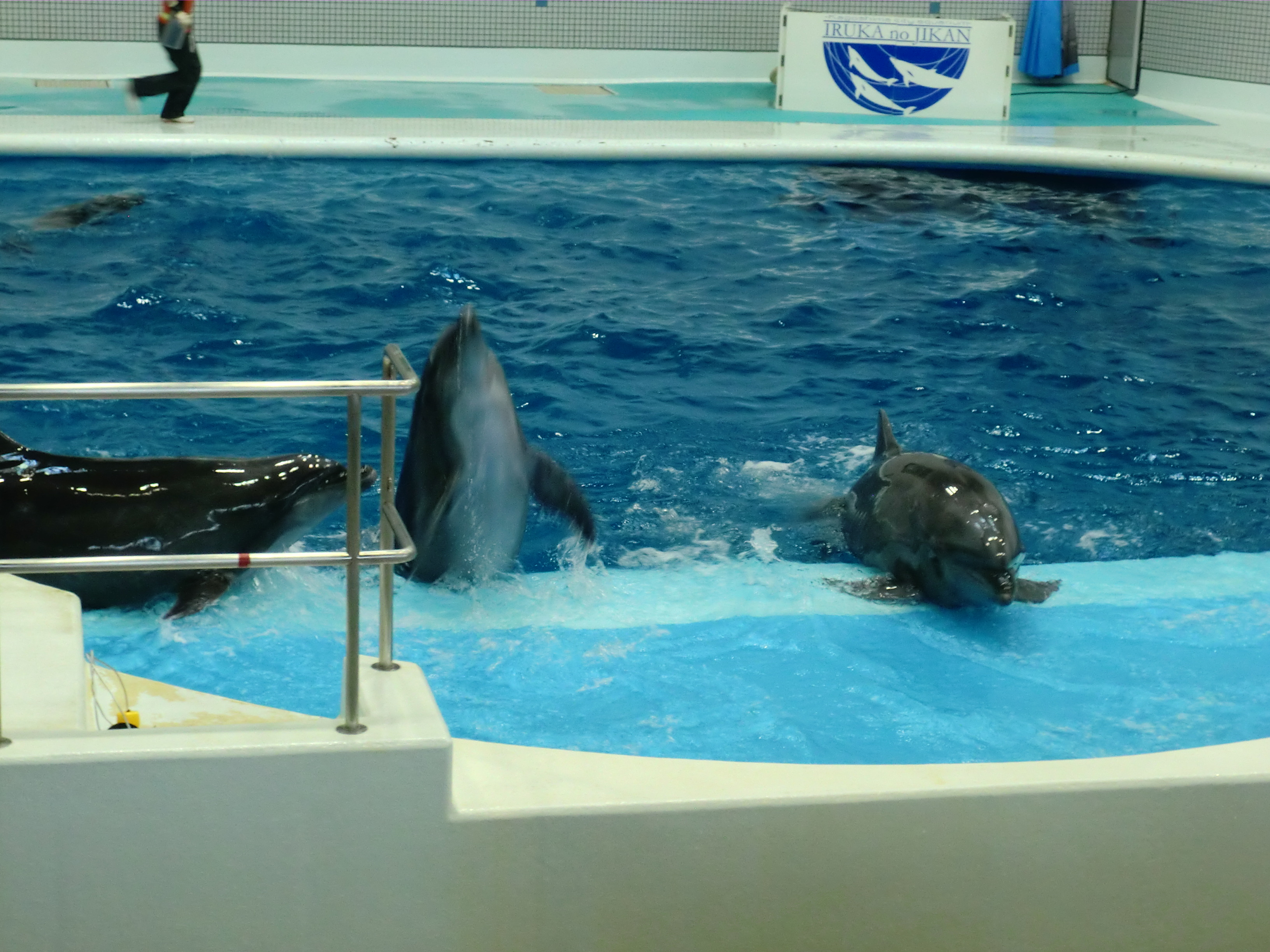

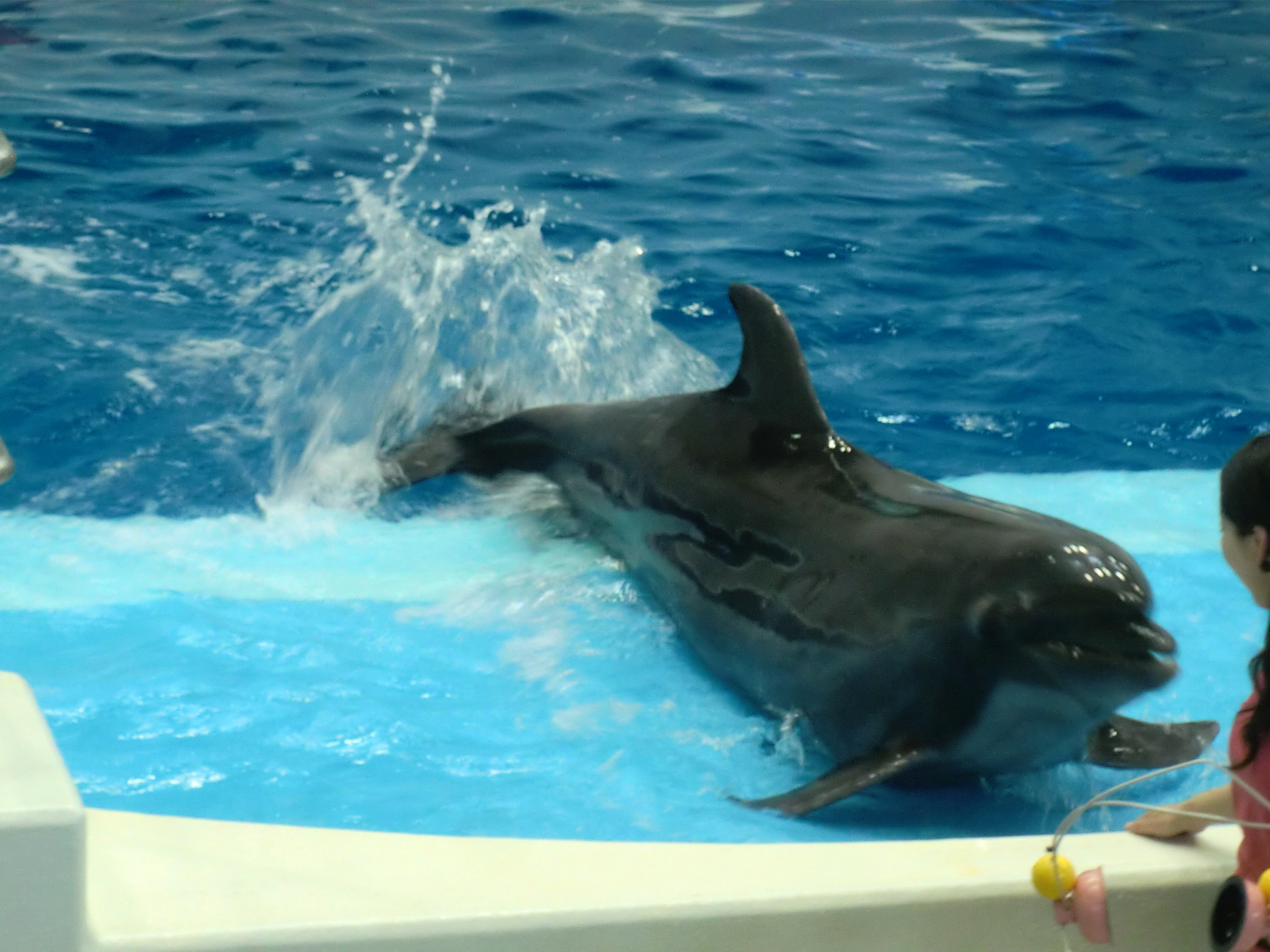

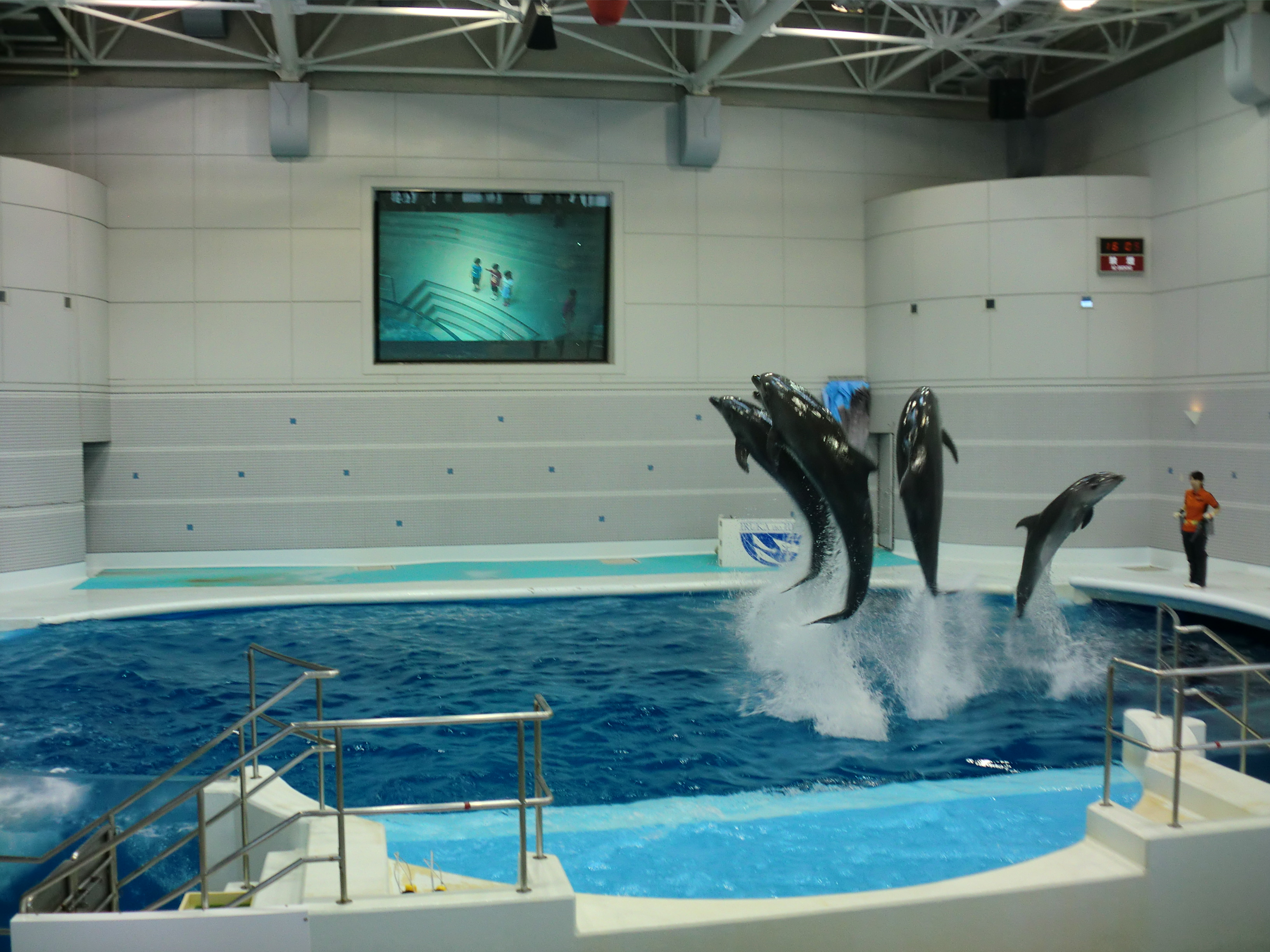
