= Goette =

Goette or Götte is a German language surname from the personal name Gothard. Notable people with the name include:

- Alexander Goette (1840–1922), German zoologist
- Barbara Goette (1908–1997), German academic
- Hans Rupprecht Goette (1956), German classical archaeologist
- Jeannette Götte (1979), German former football midfielder

== See also ==
- Goedde
