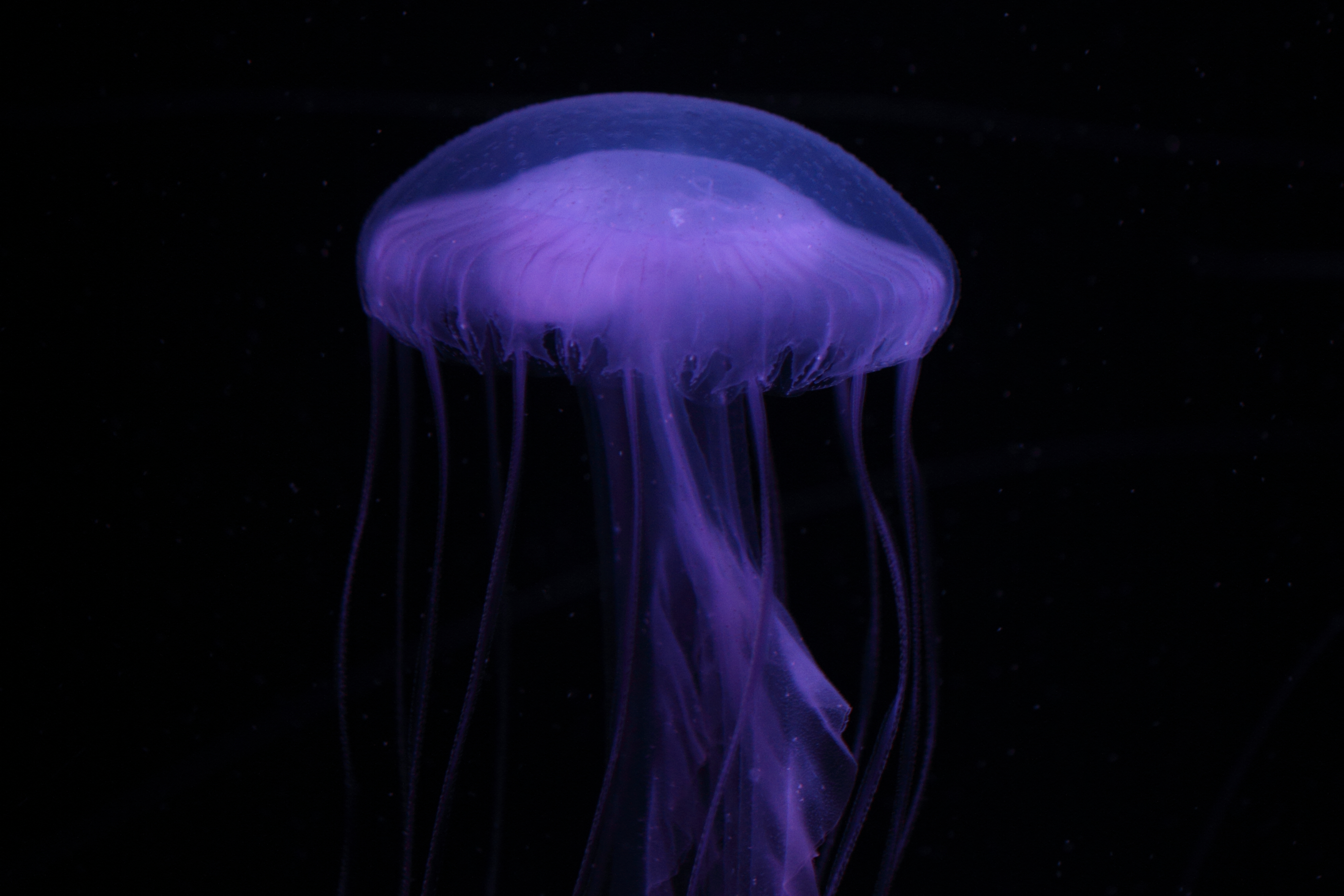
- Sanderia malayensis
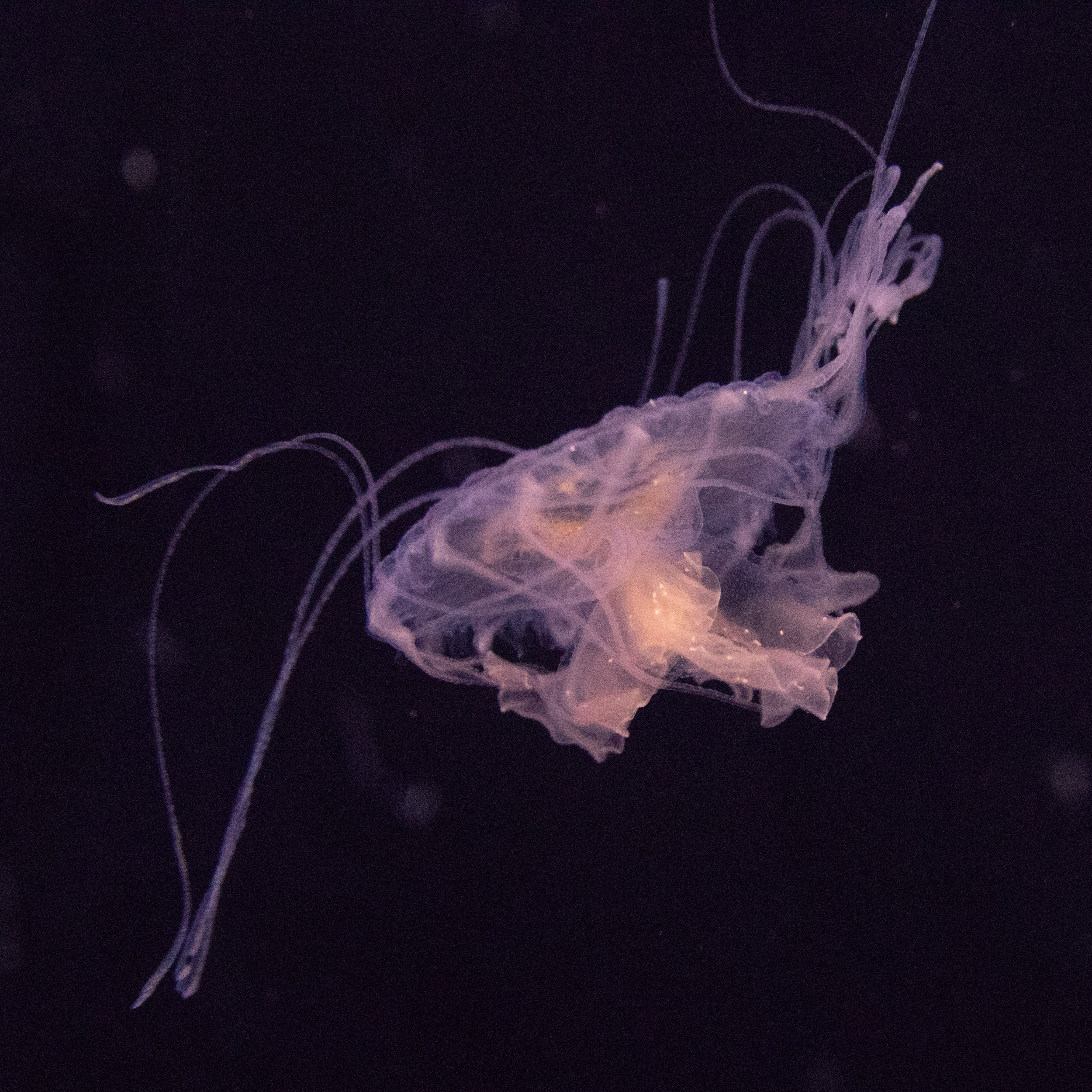

Scientific classification
- Kingdom: Animalia
- Phylum: Cnidaria
- Class: Scyphozoa
- Order: Semaeostomeae
- Family: Pelagiidae
- Genus: Sanderia; Goette, 1886

Species
- See text.

Synonyms
- Neopelagia Kishinouye, 1910

= Sanderia =

Genus of jellyfishes

Sanderia is a genus of jellyfish in the family Pelagiidae. There are two species recognized.

== Species ==
- Sanderia malayensis Goette, 1886
- Sanderia pampinosus Gershwin & Zeidler, 2008
