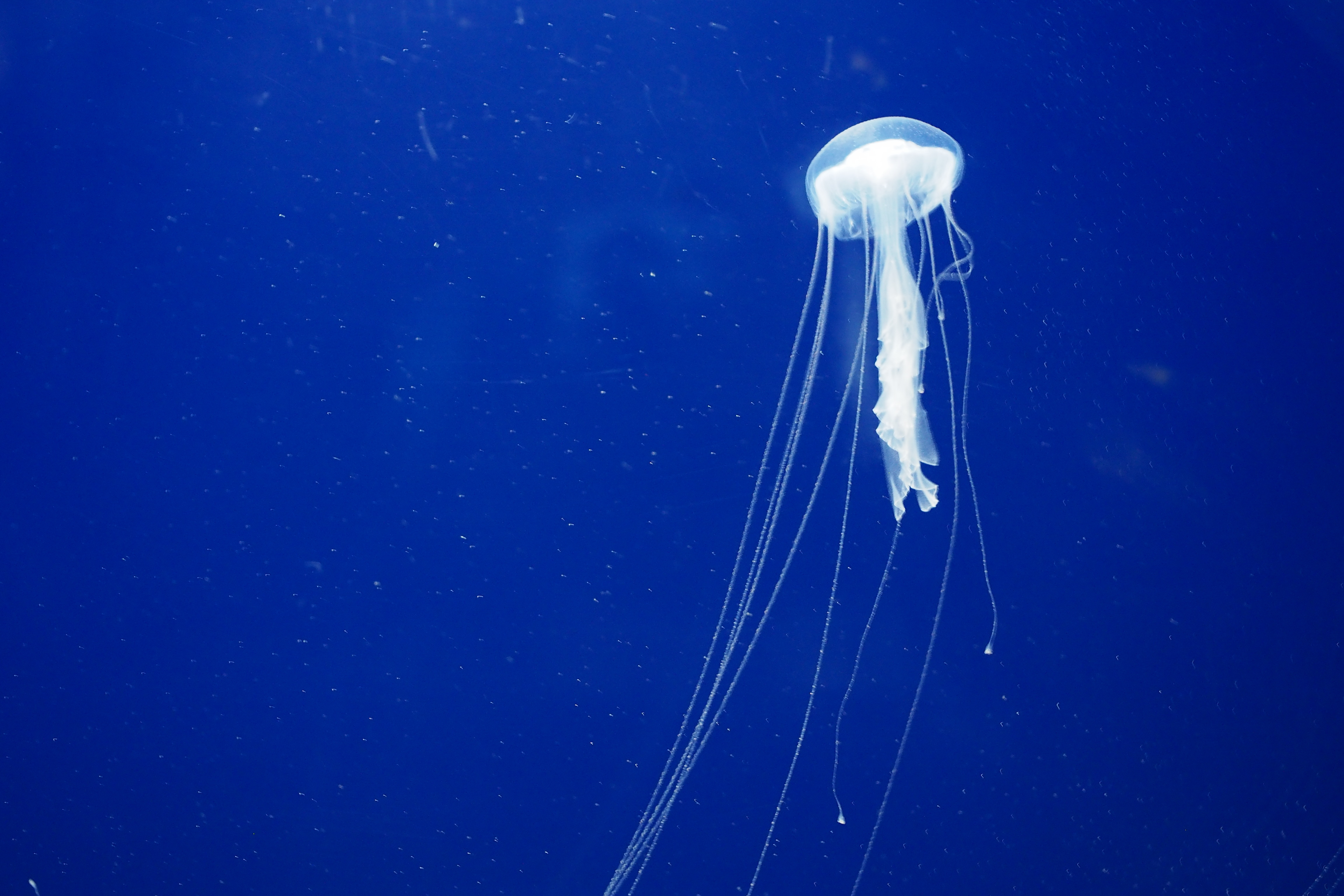

Scientific classification
- Kingdom: Animalia
- Phylum: Cnidaria
- Class: Scyphozoa
- Order: Semaeostomeae
- Family: Pelagiidae
- Genus: Sanderia
- Species: S. malayensis

Binomial name
- Sanderia malayensis Goette, 1886

Synonyms
- Neopelagia eximia Kishinouye, 1910

= Sanderia malayensis =

Species of jellyfish

Sanderia malayensis is a species of jellyfish in the family Pelagiidae, native to the tropical Indo-Pacific. It has a complex life cycle and is thought to be venomous and to have caused injuries to humans.

== Description ==
The medusa phase of S. malayensis is distinguished from other related species by having 32 marginal lappets at the edge of the transparent bell, and 16 tentacles alternating with 16 rhopalia. The edge of the bell has a short vertical "skirt", about as wide as one sixth of the bell. The stomach has four heart-shaped radial pouches each edged with up to 40 finger-like gonadal papillae. The bell is topped by a number of warts laden with nematocytes. This jellyfish is transparent, and may be yellowish or tinged violet. Sometimes there are radiating rows of reddish spots on the bell or on the mouth-arms. The diameter of the bell can be as large as 13 cm (5 in), but a more normal size is 3 to 8 cm (1 to 3 in). The marginal tentacles can be 29 cm (11 in) long with the frilled mouth-arms being 16 cm (6 in) long.

== Distribution ==
The species is native to the tropical Indo-Pacific region. Its range includes the Red Sea and Suez Canal, Pakistan, Malaysia, the Philippines and Japan.

== Life cycle ==
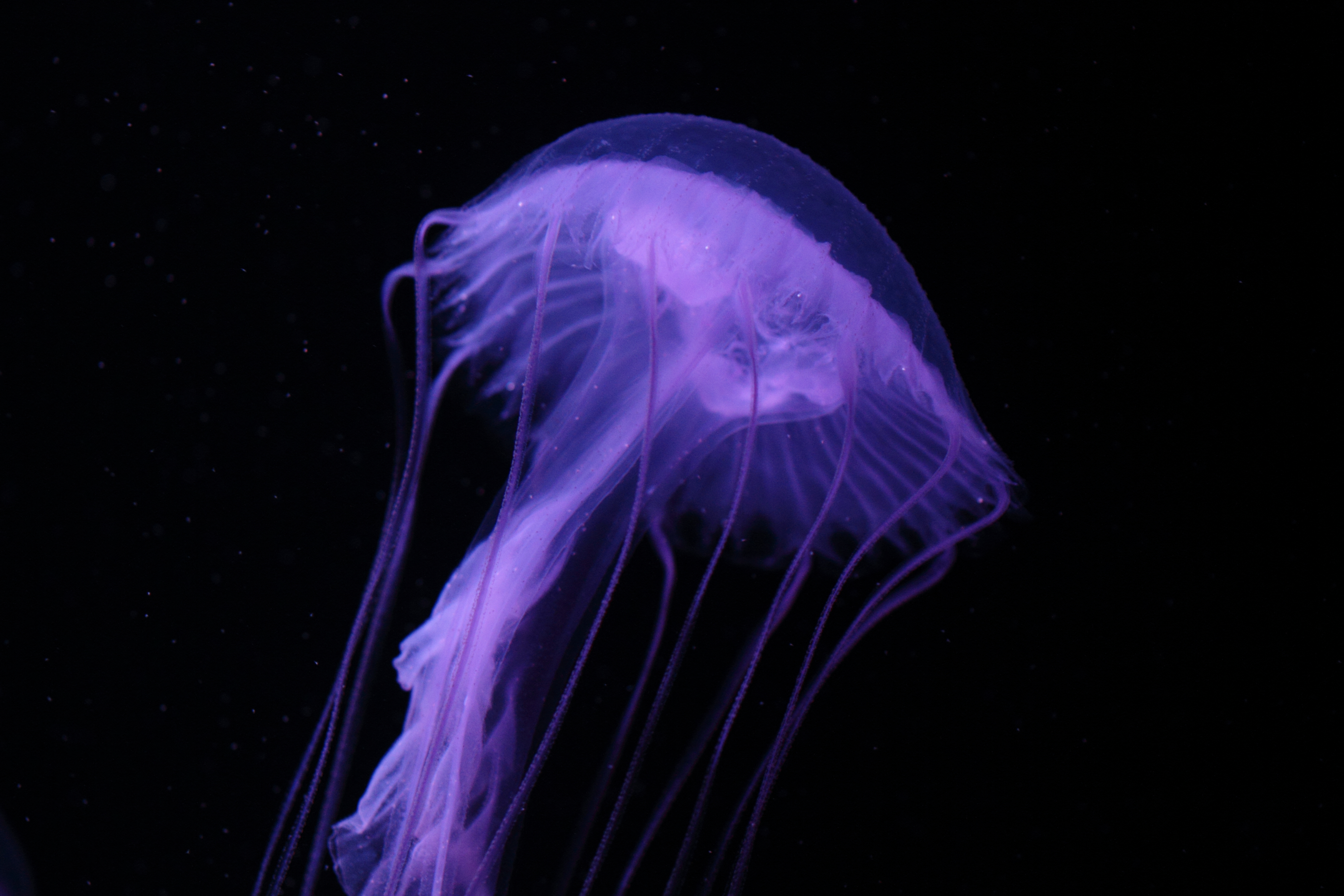

Sanderia malayensis has a complex life cycle with a number of types of asexual reproduction. New polyps can bud off existing polyps, with a moveable stolon developing at the same time on the opposite side of the mother polyp. These stolons may develop a knobbed end, curl up and attach themselves to the substrate, before detaching from the mother polyp and developing into a new polyp. Strobilation of the polyp may occur with ephyrae being formed which separate from the mother polyp. Sexual reproduction can also occur with eggs being liberated into the sea by the adult medusa. When fertilised, these develop into a free-living planula, then to a scyphistoma, to a strobila, and lastly to a free-living young medusa.

== Venom ==
S. malayensis is believed to be a venomous species of jellyfish with reports stating that it causes injury to humans. One report from the Persian Gulf near Kuwait stated that it caused severe stings with necrosis of the skin. Other reports describe it as causing "peripheral vasospasm" and "peripheral tissue necrosis", and some describe it as being moderately to severely potent. The venom has been little studied. In 2020, a proteomic study identified 51 putative toxins form the venom of S. malayensis which dominated by the hemostasis-impairing toxins and proteases toxins. First aid treatment includes removing any still-adhering tissue; this is of a very glutinous nature indicating that the nematocytes are continuing to discharge.
