= Gettle =

Gettle is a surname of German origin. Notable people with the surname include:

- Lewis E. Gettle (1863–1930), American educator, lawyer, and politician
- William Gettle (c. 1887–1941), American businessman

== See also ==
- Gettel
