= Sanderia pampinosus =

Scientific classification
- Domain: Eukaryota
- Kingdom: Animalia
- Phylum: Cnidaria
- Class: Scyphozoa
- Order: Semaeostomeae
- Family: Pelagiidae
- Genus: Sanderia
- Species: S. pampinosus

Binomial name
- Sanderia pampinosus Gershwin & Zeidler, 2008

Species of jellyfish

Sanderia pampinosus is a disc jellyfish in the family Pelagiidae from seas off northern Australia.
