= Gettel =

Gettel is a surname of German origin. Notable people with the surname include:

- Al Gettel (1917–2005), American baseball player
- Michael Gettel, American composer

== See also ==
- Gettle
