= Philip Goettel =

American Civil War Medal of Honor recipient (1840–1920)

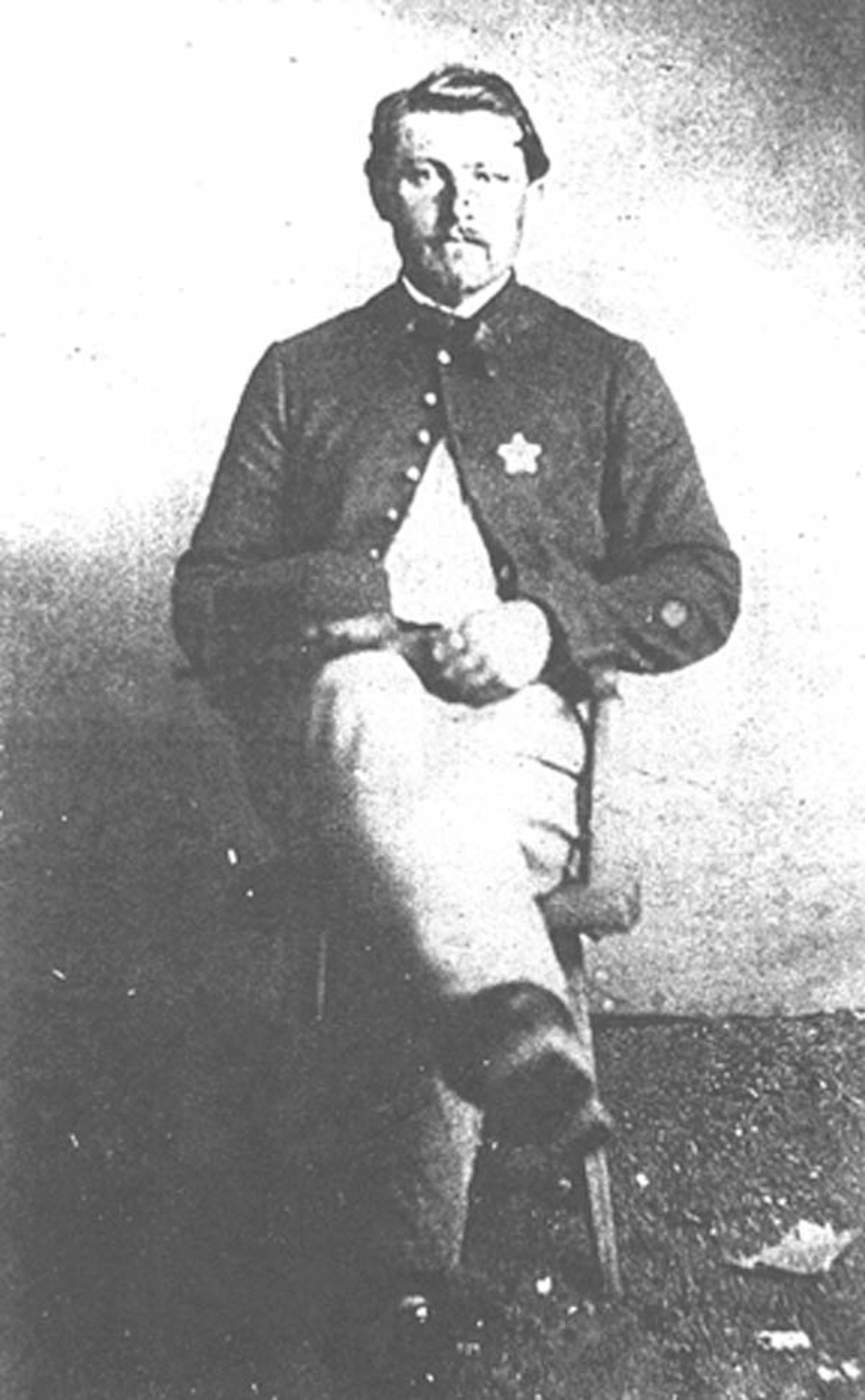
- Goettel c. 1865
- Born: September 2, 1840; Syracuse, New York, US
- Died: January 30, 1920 (aged 79)
- Burial place: Woodlawn Cemetery, Syracuse, New York
- Military career
- Allegiance: United States
- Branch: United States Army
- Rank: Private
- Units: Company B, 149th New York Volunteer Infantry Regiment
- Conflicts: American Civil War
- Awards: Medal of Honor

Philip Goettel (September 2, 1840 – January 30, 1920) was a Union Army soldier in the American Civil War who received the U.S. military's highest decoration, the Medal of Honor.

Goettel was born in Syracuse, where he entered service. He was awarded the Medal of Honor for extraordinary heroism shown in Lookout Mountain, Tennessee, when he captured a flag and battery guidon while serving as a Private with Company B of the 149th New York Infantry on November 24, 1863. His Medal of Honor was issued on June 28, 1865.

Goettel died in his native Syracuse on January 30, 1920, and was buried at Syracuse's Woodlawn Cemetery.

== Medal of Honor citation ==
The President of the United States of America, in the name of Congress, takes pleasure in presenting the Medal of Honor to Private Philip Goettel, United States Army, for extraordinary heroism on 24 November 1863, while serving with Company B, 149th New York Infantry, in action at Lookout Mountain, Tennessee, for the capture of the flag and battery guidon.
