= Goedde =

Goedde or Gödde is a surname. Notable people with the surname include:

- John Goedde (born 1949), American politician
- Stefan Gödde (born 1975), German television presenter
- Steve Diet Goedde (born 1965), American fetish photographer
