= Alexander W. von Götte =

German zoologist (1840–1922)

Alexander Wilhelm Götte (December 31, 1840 – February 5, 1922), best known as Alexander W. von Goette, was a German zoologist born in St. Petersburg. He is remembered for his studies involving the biological development of various animals. The invertebrate species Opisthocystis goettei (Bresslau, 1906) is named after him.

He studied medicine at the Imperial University of Dorpat, obtaining his doctorate in 1866 at Tübingen. In 1872 he began work as an assistant to Eduard Oscar Schmidt (1823–1886) at the institute of zoology in Strasbourg, and in 1877 became an associate professor. From 1882 to 1886 he was director of the zoological institute at the University of Rostock, afterwards returning to Strasbourg, where he taught classes until 1918.

Goette accepted evolution but was a critical of the ideas of Charles Darwin and Ernst Haeckel. He rejected natural selection and favoured guided evolution by a law-governed process.

== Selected publications ==
- Beiträge zur Entwickelungsgeschichte des Darmkanals im Hühnchen (Contributions to the biological development of the intestinal canal in the chicken), 1867.
- Die Entwicklungsgeschichte der Unke (Bombinator igneus) als Grundlage einer vergleichenden Morphologie der Wirbelthiere; (The biological development of the toad, Bombinator igneus, as the basis of a comparative morphology of vertebrates), 1875 – In this work Götte sought to bring all the elements of animal morphology together in order to produce a uniform natural causal relationship.
- Über Entwicklung und Regeneration of Gliedmassenskelets der Molche (On the development and regeneration of body parts in salamanders), 1879.
- Über den Ursprung des Todes (On the origin of death), 1883.
- Abhandlungen zur Entwickelungsgeschichte der Tiere (Treatise on the biological development of animals); (4 volumes, 1884–1890).
- Claus und die Entwicklung der Scyphomedusen (On the development of jellyfish), 1891.
- Holbeins Totentanz und seine Vorbilder (Hans Holbein the Younger's "Totentanz and its Idols"), 1897.
- Lehrbuch der Zoologie (Textbook of zoology), 1902.
