= Jellyfish as food =

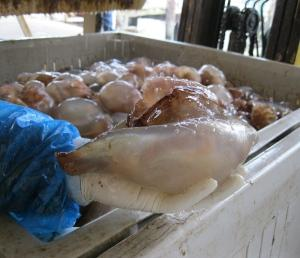
Raw cannonball jellyfish (known locally as "jellyballs") in the U.S. state of Georgia prior to being dried, preserved and packaged. After processing, the product is sold to a seafood distributor that ships them to Japan, China, the Philippines, and Thailand.

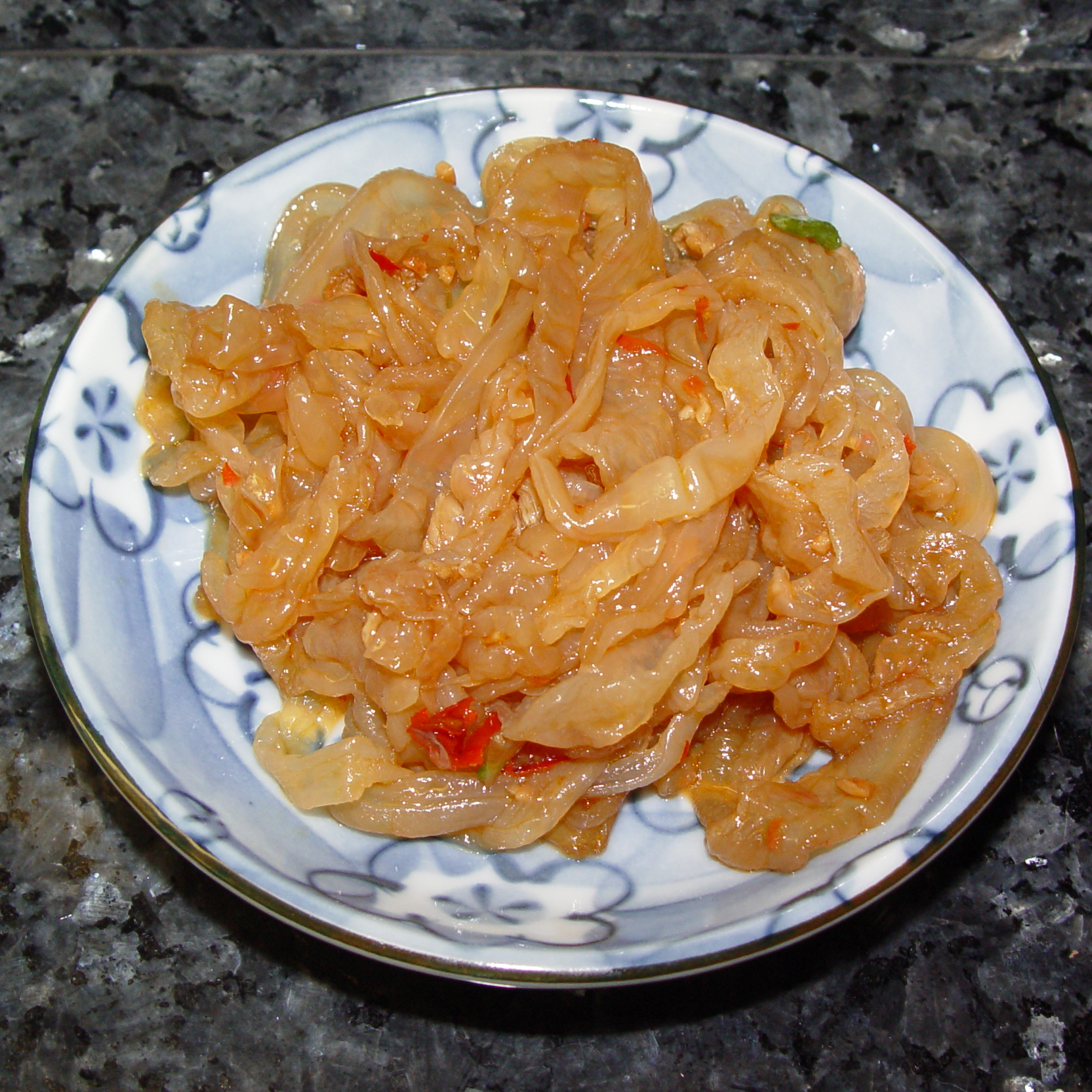
Edible jellyfish prepared with sesame oil and chili sauce

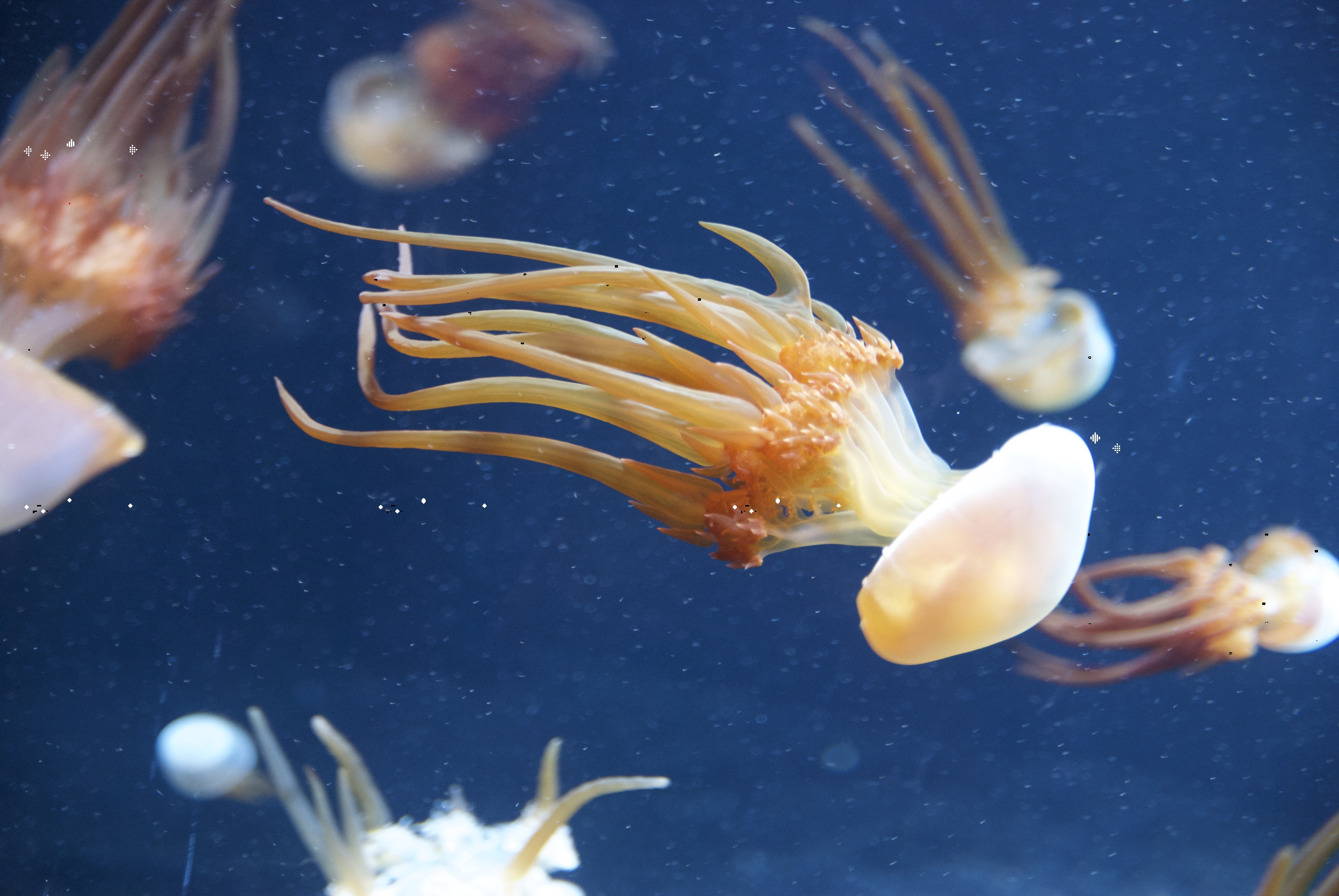
Rhopilema esculentum is a species of edible jellyfish

Some species of jellyfish are suitable for human consumption and are used as a source of food and as an ingredient in various dishes. Edible jellyfish is a seafood that is harvested and consumed in several East and Southeast Asian countries, and in some Asian countries it is considered to be a delicacy. Edible jellyfish is often processed into a dried product. Several types of foods and dishes may be prepared with edible jellyfish, including salads, sushi, noodles, and main courses. Various methods of preparation are used.

== Edible jellyfish ==
In China, some species of jellyfish in the Rhizostomeae order caught in coastal areas have been utilized as an aphrodisiac and a source of food and ingredient in Chinese cuisine for over 1,700 years. Cannonball jellyfish (Stomolophus meleagris) and jelly blubber (Catostylus mosaicus) are edible species of jellyfish. When live, the cannonball jellyfish contains toxins that can cause cardiac problems. Rhopilema esculentum and Rhopilema hispidum are edible jellyfish, and are the most common ones consumed in China, Japan and Korea. Additional edible jellyfish species include Aurelia aurita, Crambionella orsini, Chrysaora pacifica, Lobonema smithii, Lobonemoides gracilis and Nomura's jellyfish (Nemopilema nomurai). Desalted ready-to-use jellyfish are low in calories and contain hardly any fat, about 5% protein and 95% water. They do not have much flavor, and may be used to add additional texture and mouthfeel to various dishes. In some areas of Asia, jellyfish is "associated with easing bone and muscle pain."

== Production ==
In 2001, the annual global harvest of edible jellyfish was estimated to be around 321,000 metric tons (316,000 long tons; 354,000 short tons). The most prominent countries involved in edible jellyfish production are Myanmar, China, Indonesia, Korea, Malaysia, the Philippines and Thailand. In China, jellyfish larvae are reared in ponds before being released as juveniles into the sea to grow and mature. In Southeast Asia, edible species of jellyfish may be harvested using various nets such as drift nets, scoop nets, set nets and hand nets, hooks and beach seines. In 2001, the estimated annual catch in Southeast Asia in net weight was at around 169,000 metric tons (166,000 long tons; 186,000 short tons). The amount of jellyfish caught annually in this region can vary significantly, and the fishing season for them is relatively short, at two to four months.

== Processing ==
Traditional methods of processing jellyfish into a dried food product can take a considerable amount of time, between 19 and 37 days. A common processing technique is the preservation of jellyfish, which may utilize salt curing, creating a dried finished product. Some commercially processed edible jellyfish are purveyed in dried sheets. The process of producing dehydrated jellyfish typically includes the removal of the tentacles prior to drying, because the upper dome area of the marine animal is the part typically used for cooking.

Jellyfish deteriorate rapidly at room temperature so processing starts soon after they are caught. The bell is separated from the dangling oral arms and both are washed in seawater before being scraped to remove the gonads and mucus. Dehydration is traditionally undertaken by sprinkling the jellyfish with table salt and alum, draining off the brine and repeating the process. Finally the jellyfish are heaped to drain, turned several times and left to dry. The whole process takes three to six weeks and results in a product with about 65% moisture and 20% salt. The alum reduces the pH and serves to firm the texture while the salt removes water and prevents microbial deterioration. In Malaysia and Thailand, a little sodium bicarbonate, which facilitates dehydration and increases crispness, is added during processing.

== Consumption ==
Jellyfish is consumed in several East Asian and Southeast Asian countries. In 2001, it was reported that Japan had annually imported between 5,400 and 10,000 tons of edible jellyfish from Indonesia, Malaysia, Myanmar, the Philippines, Singapore, Thailand, and Vietnam. Dehydrated and pickled jellyfish is considered a delicacy in several Asian countries, including China, Korea, Vietnam, and Japan. Dehydrated jellyfish can be prepared for eating by soaking it in water for several hours to rehydrate it, and then parboiling, rinsing and slicing it.

=== Hazard ===
Consuming echizen kurage is potentially dangerous if the toxic part is not thoroughly cleaned and cooked.

=== Dishes ===
Jellyfish salad, a popular dish in some areas of Asia, may be prepared using cold marinated jellyfish that is thinly sliced. Some Chinese restaurants such as Din Tai Fung serve jellyfish salad as a part of their meals. Jellyfish sushi is consumed in Japan. In Thailand, a crunchy style of noodle is produced using jellyfish. The Japanese company Tango Jersey Dairy produces a vanilla and jellyfish ice cream, prepared using cubes of diced Nomura's jellyfish (Echizen kurage in Japanese) soaked in milk. It has been described as "slightly chewy". In Sarawak, the eastern part of Malaysia, a traditional delicacy by Melanau people also uses raw fresh jellyfish into a salad dish called Umai. Following the 2009 Japanese Nomura's jellyfish bloom, students in Obama, Fukui designed a Nomurao Jellyfish powder to be used to make caramel sweets as part of a NASA-designed food safety management system established in the school.

Jellyfish dishes

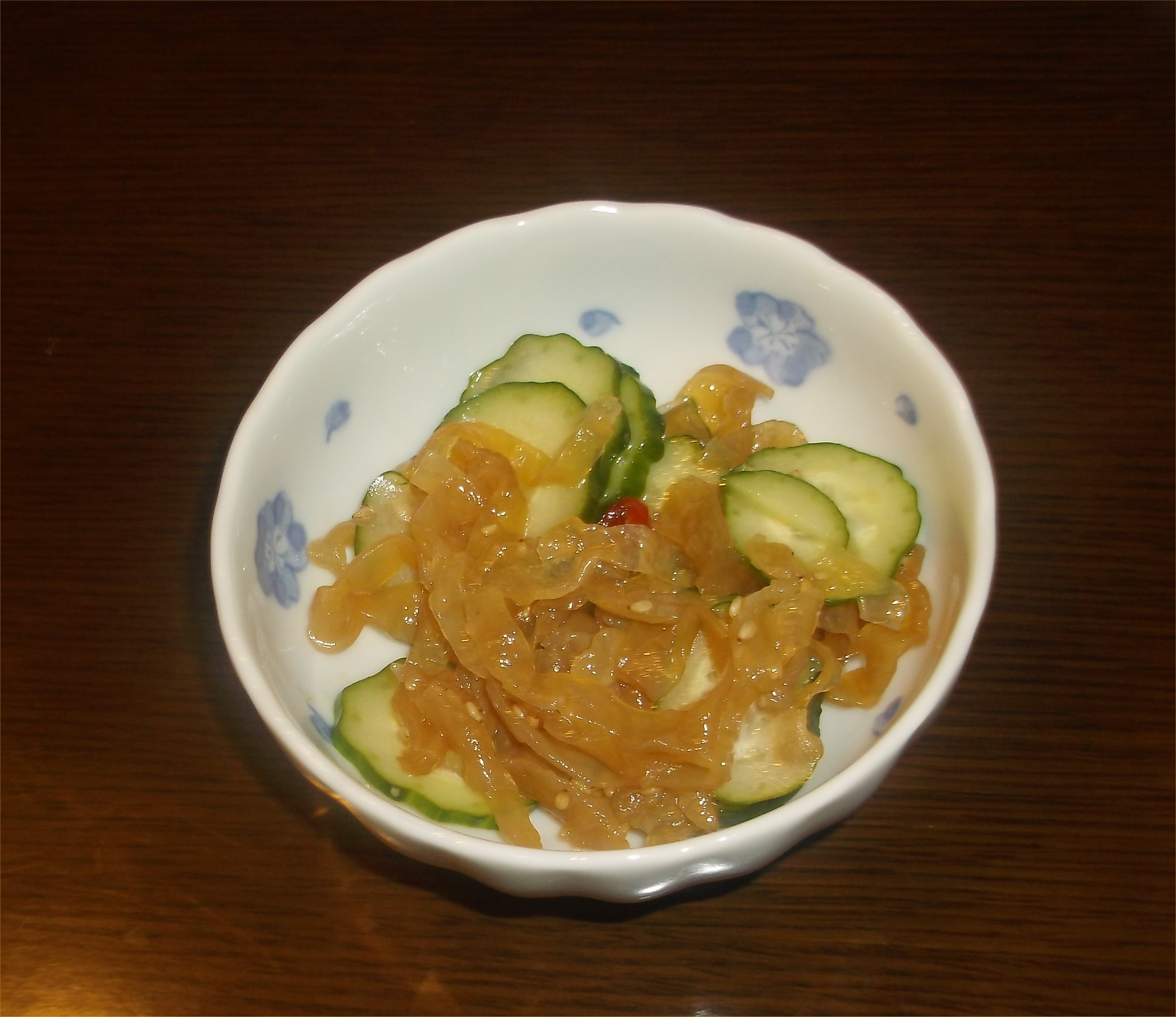
A simple jellyfish salad

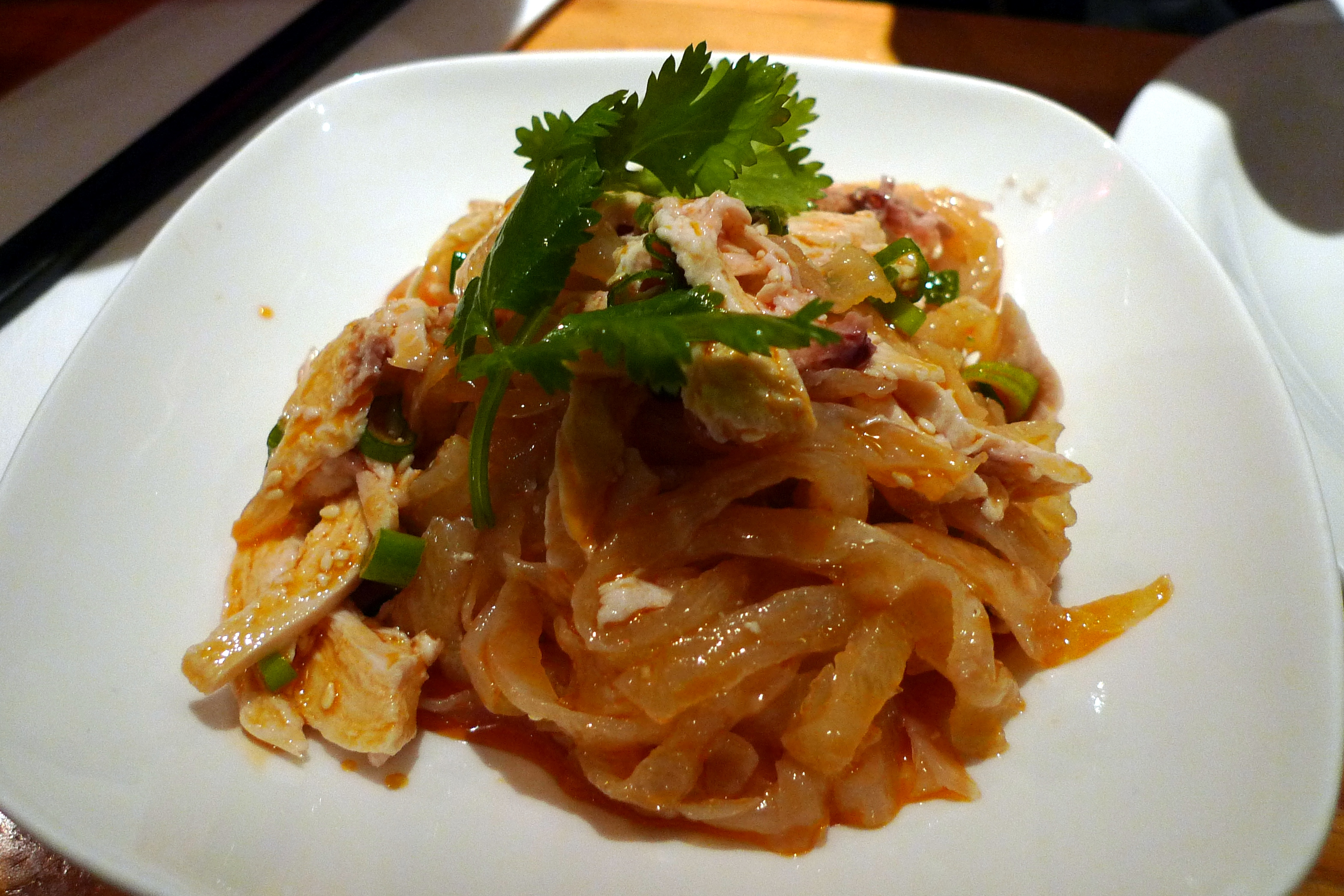
Jellyfish with shredded chicken at a restaurant

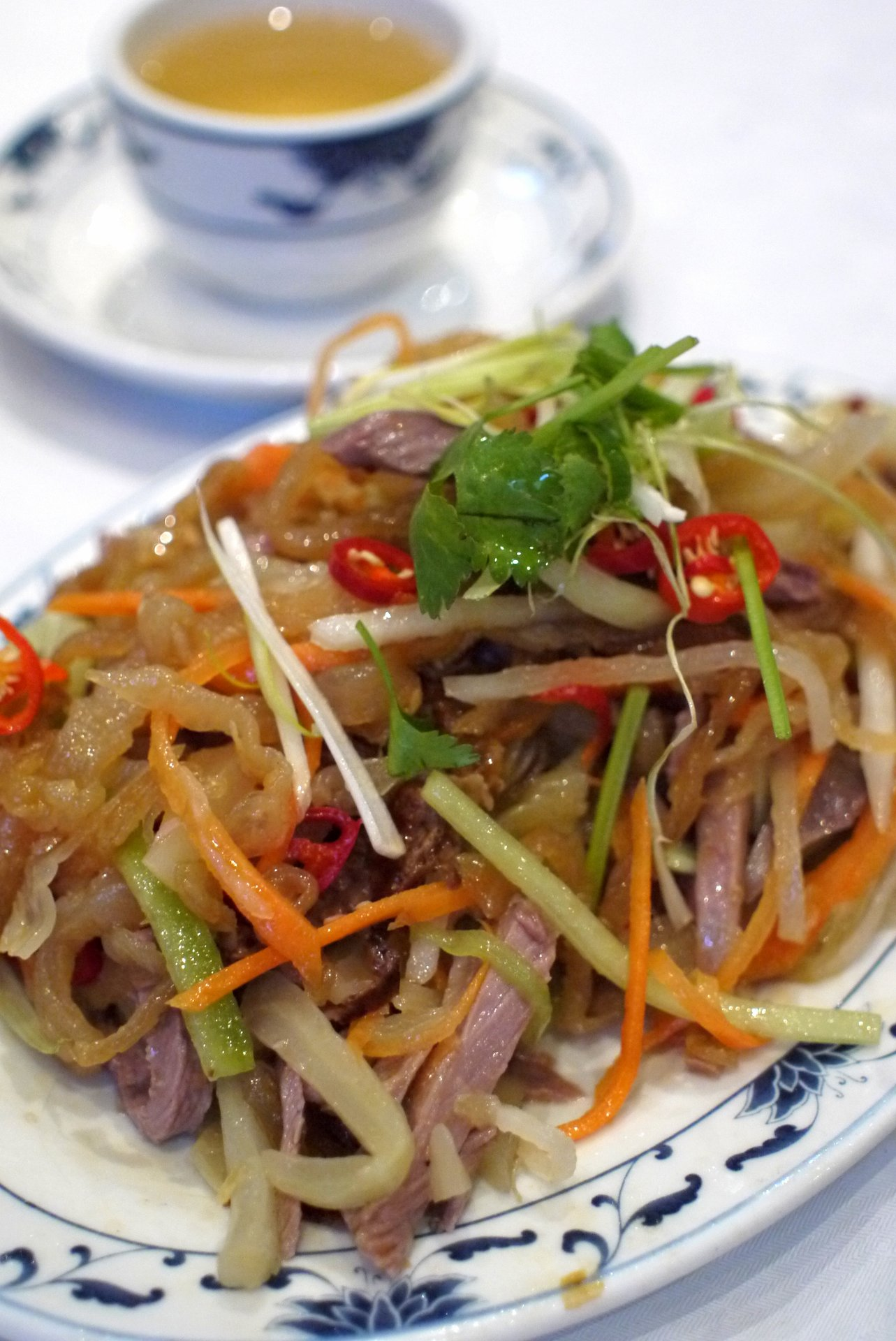
A jellyfish and roast duck salad

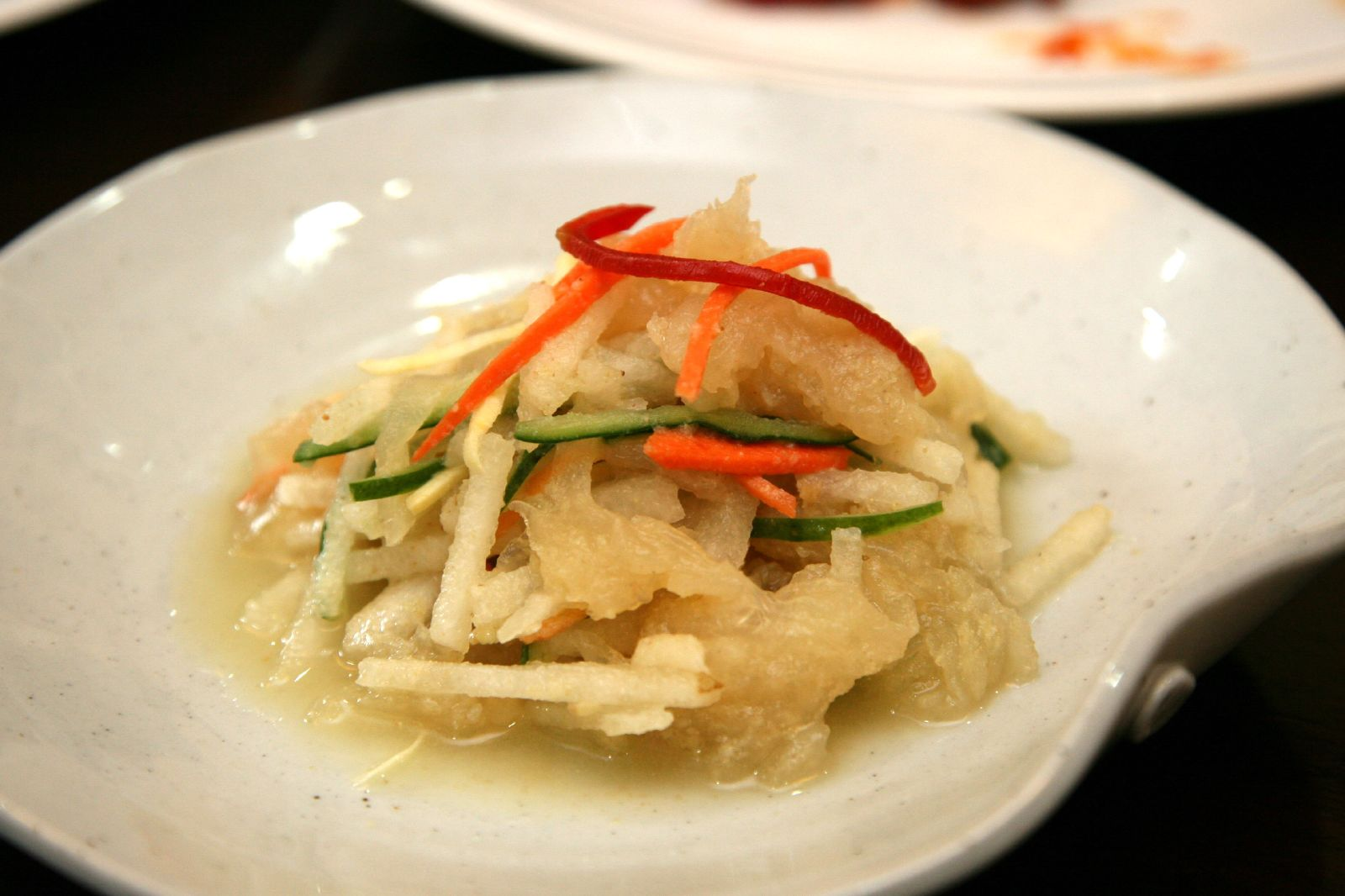
A Korean dish incorporating jellyfish

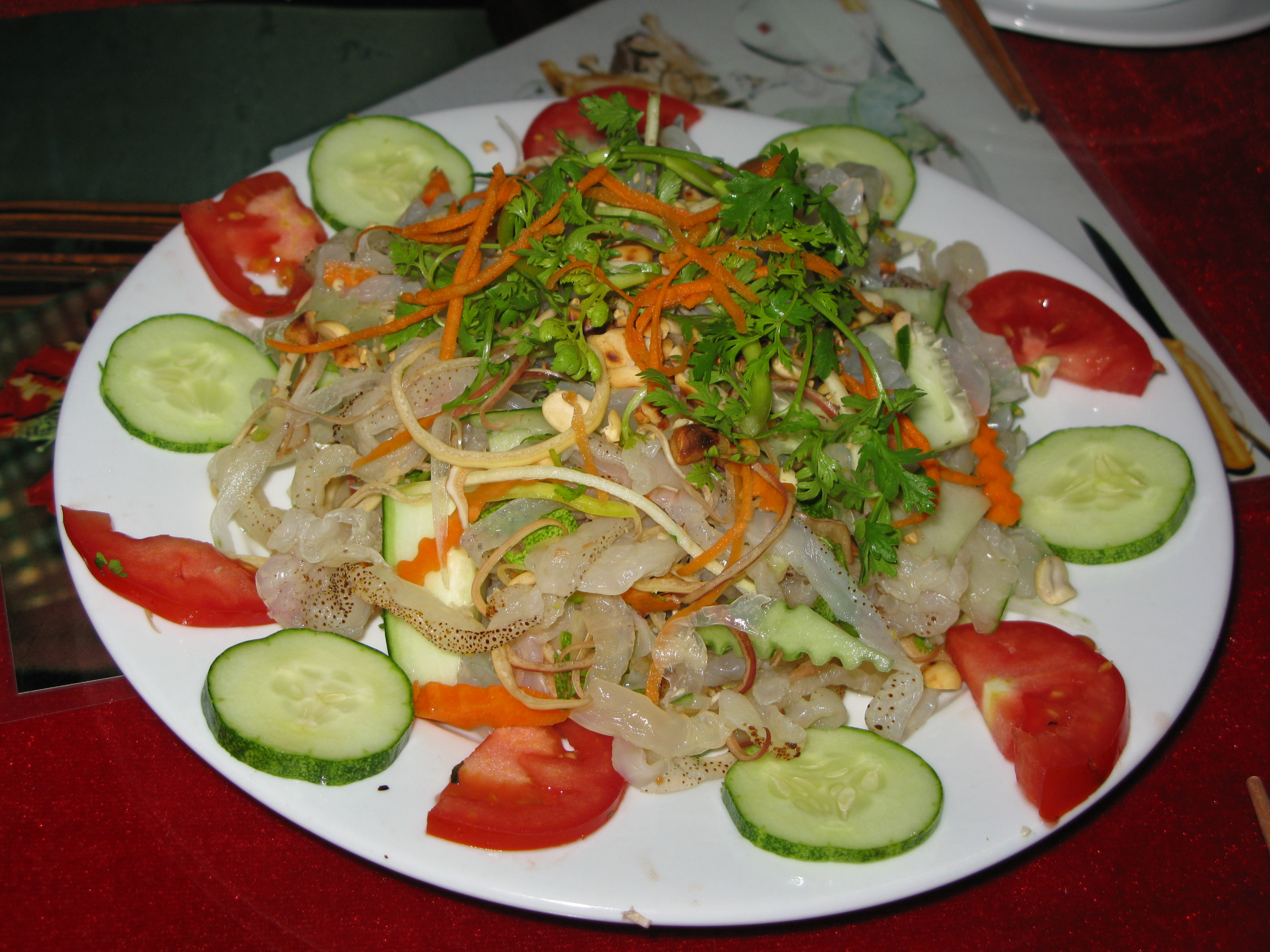
A jellyfish salad

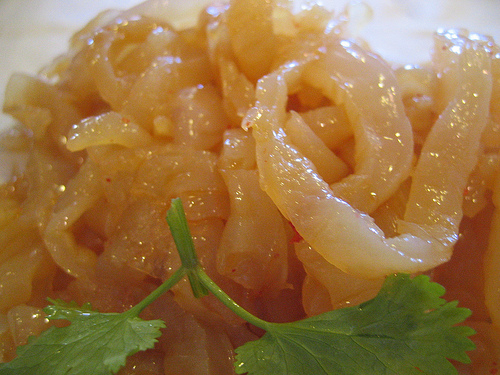
A close-up view of Cantonese-style jellyfish

== See also ==
- List of delicacies
- List of dried foods
- List of types of seafood
