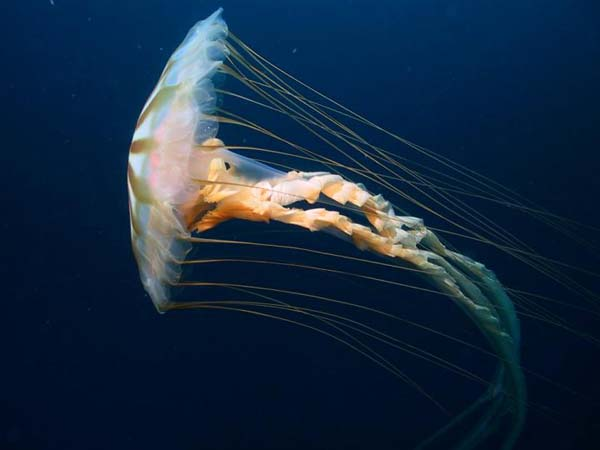

Scientific classification
- Kingdom: Animalia
- Phylum: Cnidaria
- Class: Scyphozoa
- Order: Semaeostomeae
- Family: Pelagiidae
- Genus: Chrysaora
- Species: C. melanaster

Binomial name
- Chrysaora melanaster (Brandt, 1835)

Synonyms
- Chrysaora depressa (Kishinouye 1902)

= Chrysaora melanaster =

Northern sea nettle

Species of cnidarian

Chrysaora melanaster, commonly known as the northern sea nettle or brown jellyfish, is a species of jellyfish native to the northern Pacific Ocean and adjacent parts of the Arctic Ocean. It is sometimes referred to as a Pacific sea nettle, but this name is also used for C. fuscescens; the name Japanese sea nettle was also used for this species, but that name now exclusively refers to C. pacifica. Although jellyfish kept in public aquariums sometimes are referred to as C. melanaster, this is the result of the historical naming confusion and these actually are C. pacifica.

== Description ==
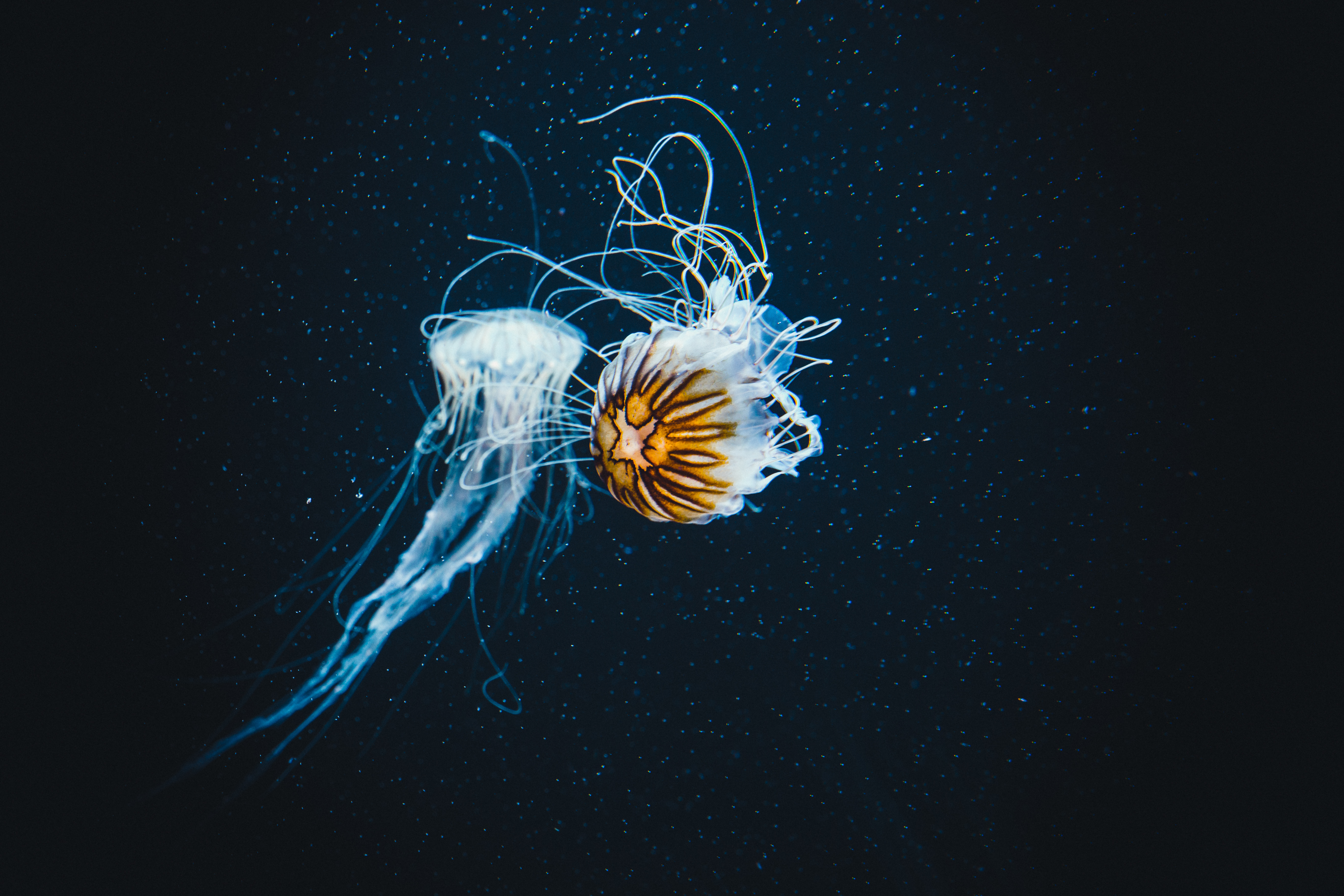
Chrysaora melanaster

The medusa of the northern sea nettle can reach 60 cm (2 ft) in diameter with tentacles growing up to 3 m (10 ft). The number of tentacles is up to 24 (three per octant). It dwells at depths of up to 100 meters, where it feeds on copepods, larvaceans, small fish, large zooplankton, and other jellies. The sting is mild, although can cause serious skin irritation and burning. The lifespan is unknown.

== Habitat ==
The northern sea nettle is found in open water of temperate northern Pacific Ocean, Arctic Ocean and especially the Bering Sea.

A brown jellyfish swimming

== Ecology ==
Pollock can be both the food of the northern sea nettle and also the competitor for potentially limited sources of prey.

== Status ==
The total biomass of the northern sea nettle has increased in recent years as climate change has caused a more stable and productive surface layer. This increased stability of the water column would also have contributed to the warmer surface temperatures found in late summer in the 1990s, leading to increased growth and survival of the northern sea nettle.
