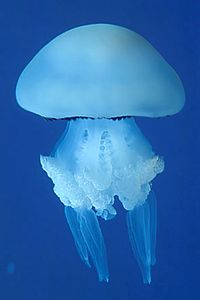
- Rhizostoma pulmo

Scientific classification
- Kingdom: Animalia
- Phylum: Cnidaria
- Class: Scyphozoa
- Order: Rhizostomeae
- Suborder: Dactyliophorae
- Family: Rhizostomatidae; Cuvier, 1799

Genera
- See text

= Rhizostomatidae =

Rhizostomatidae Temporal range: Early Eocene to present

Family of jellyfishes

Rhizostomatidae is a family of cnidarians in the class Scyphozoa.

== Genera and species ==
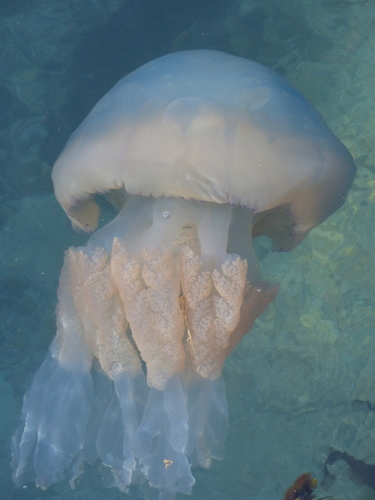
Rhizostoma octopus

According to the World Register of Marine Species, 11 extant species are in four extant genera within this family:

- Genus Eupilema
  - Eupilema inexpectata Pages, Gili & Bouillon, 1992
- Genus Nemopilema
  - Nemopilema nomurai Kishinouye, 1922
- Genus Rhizostoma Cuvier, 1800
  - Rhizostoma luteum (Quoy & Gaimard, 1827)
  - Rhizostoma octopus (Linnaeus, 1758)
  - Rhizostoma pulmo (Macri, 1778)
- Genus Rhopilema Haeckel, 1880
  - Rhopilema esculentum Kishinouye, 1891
  - Rhopilema hispidum
  - Rhopilema nomadica
  - Rhopilema rhopalophora (Haeckel)
  - Rhopilema rhopalophorum Haeckel, 1880
  - Rhopilema verrilli

=== Extinct taxa ===
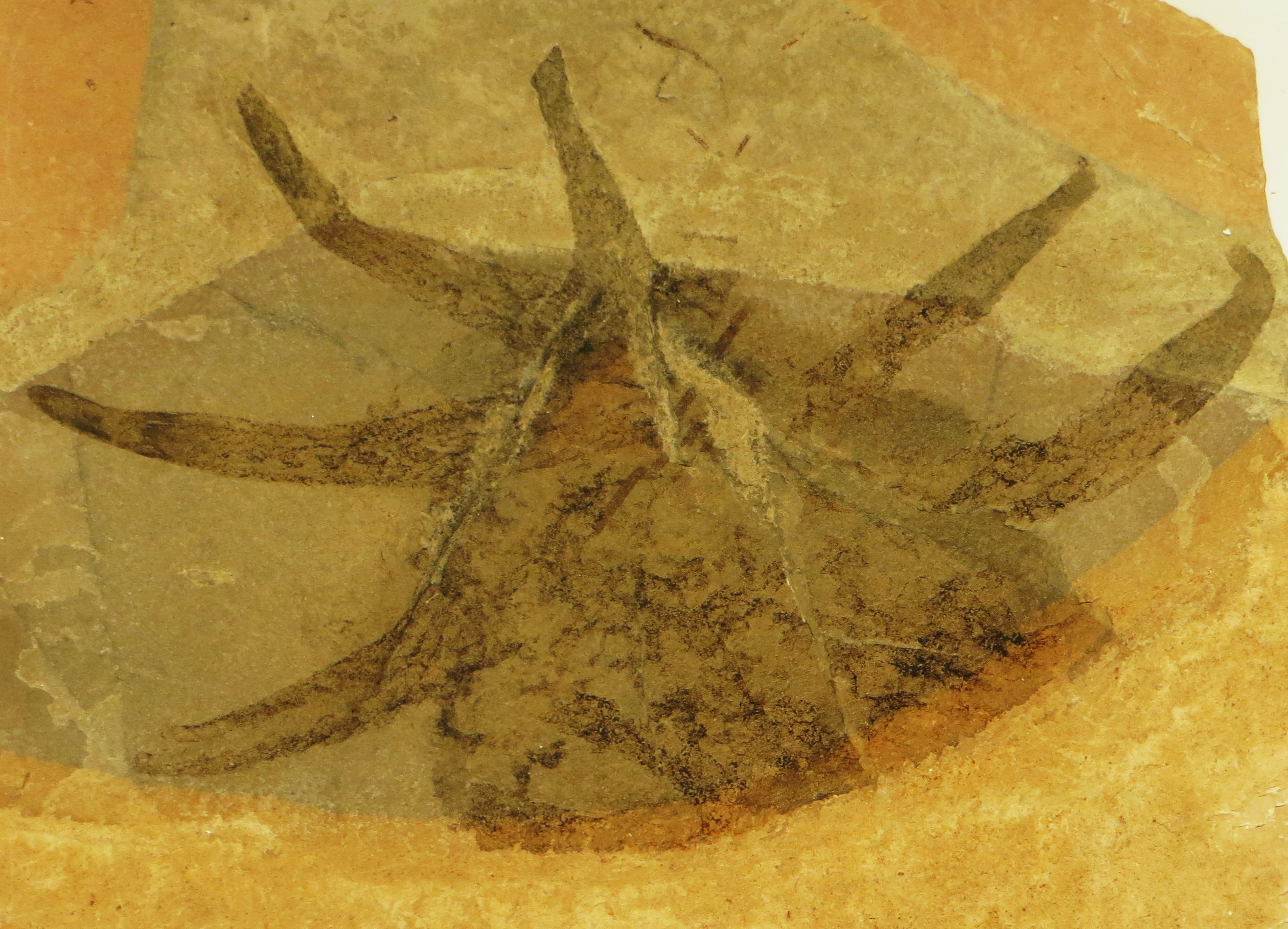
Simplicibrachia, one of the very few known fossil rhizostomatids

- Genus †Marejellia Žalohar, Gašparič & Hitij, 2025 - Middle Miocene of Slovenia (Tunjice Hills lagerstatte)
- Genus †Simplicibrachia Broglio Loriga & Sala Manservigi, 1973 - Ypresian of Italy (Monte Bolca lagerstatte)
