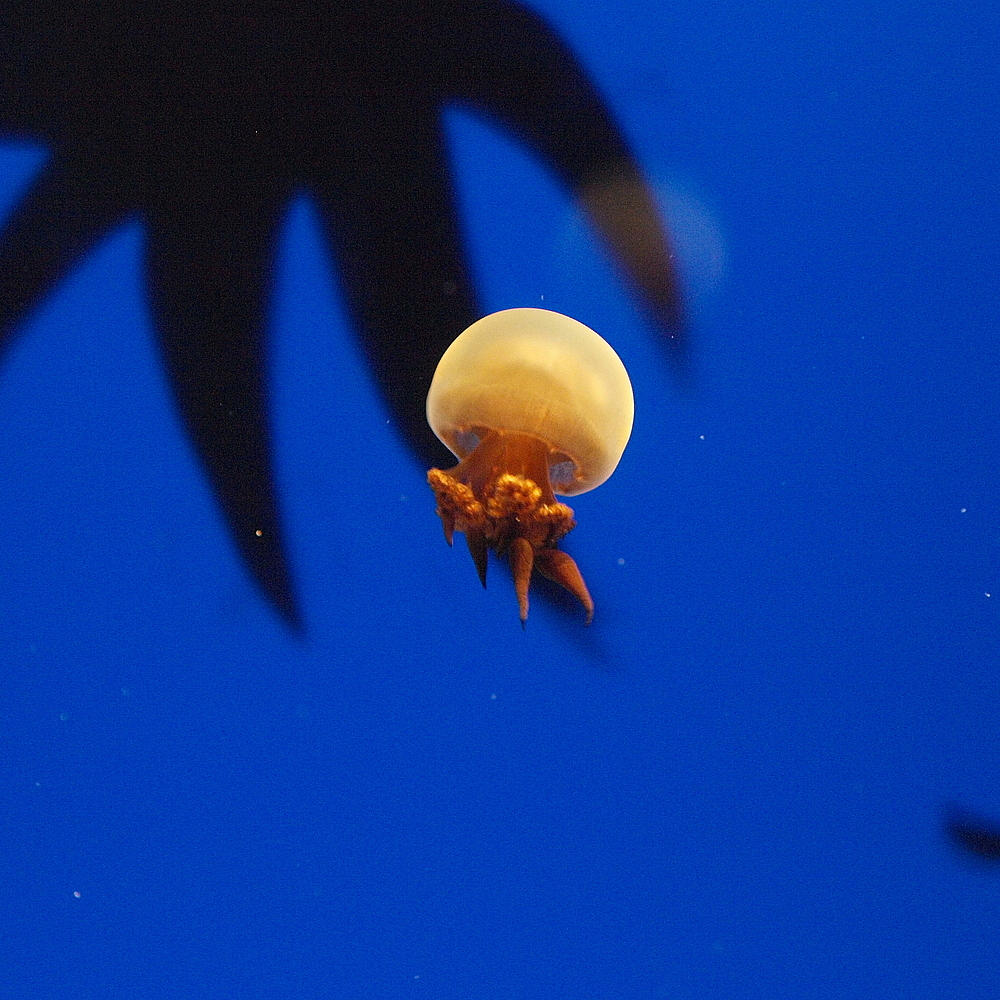
- Rhopilema esculenta

Scientific classification
- Domain: Eukaryota
- Kingdom: Animalia
- Phylum: Cnidaria
- Class: Scyphozoa
- Order: Rhizostomeae
- Family: Rhizostomatidae
- Genus: Rhopilema; Haeckel, 1880

Species
- See text

= Rhopilema =

Genus of jellyfishes

Rhopilema is a genus of jellyfish.

Species include:

- Rhopilema asamushi
- Rhopilema esculentum ("Bizen kurage") Kishinouye 1891
- Rhopilema hispidum ("Hizen kurage") Vanhoffen 1888
- Rhopilema nomadica, (Indo-Pacific nomadic jellyfish) a dangerously venomous Indo-Pacific species recently introduced to the Mediterranean Sea
- Rhopilema rhopalophorum Haeckel, 1880 Rhopilema rhopalophora is a synonym.
- Rhopilema verrilli
