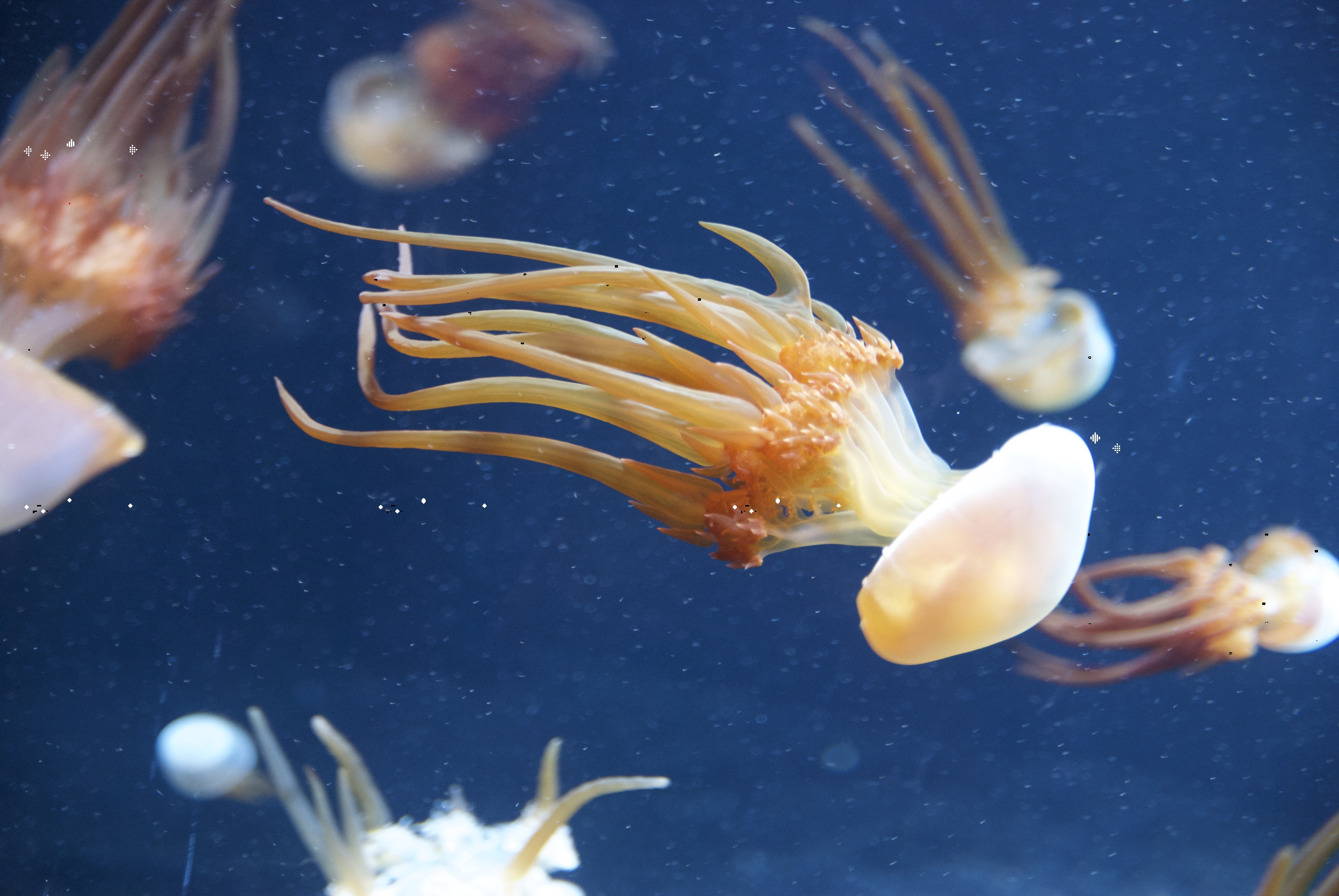

Scientific classification
- Domain: Eukaryota
- Kingdom: Animalia
- Phylum: Cnidaria
- Class: Scyphozoa
- Order: Rhizostomeae
- Family: Rhizostomatidae
- Genus: Rhopilema
- Species: R. esculentum

Binomial name
- Rhopilema esculentum Kishinouye, 1891

Synonyms
- Rhopilema asamushi Uchida, 1927

= Rhopilema esculentum =

Species of jellyfish

Rhopilema esculentum, the flame jellyfish, is a species of jellyfish native to the warm temperate waters of the Pacific Ocean. It is a popular seafood in southeastern Asia. In the 1980s, research was undertaken in China into its aquaculture, and it is now bred in ponds in that country before being released into the sea to grow to a mature size suitable for the fishery.

== Description ==
Like other members of the order Rhizostomeae, the medusa stage of Rhopilema esculentum has no tentacles at the margin of the bell. Instead, underneath the bell it has eight highly branched oral arms, fused at the base and with numerous secondary mouth openings. The bell is rigid, tough and thick with a smooth surface. It is usually suffused with red.

== Distribution and habitat ==
Rhopilema esculentum is found in western Japan, the Bohai Sea, the Yellow Sea, the East China Sea and the North Malayan Sea. It drifts with the currents and is found near the surface in calm weather. It is swept inshore by the rising tide and drifts back out as the tide falls.

== Aquaculture and fishery ==
Millions of pond-reared jellyfish with a bell diameter of around 12.5 millimetres (0.5 in) are released into suitable locations such as Liaodong Bay, in Liaodong Province, China, between May and June each year. They grow rapidly and permits are issued allowing fishing some two months later, the optimum fishing period being around mid-August. The fishing grounds are shallow semi-enclosed locations with large tidal flows, freshwater inflows and abundant food. The average weight of a jellyfish when harvested is 2.5 kilograms (5.5 lb), and in 2005, the recovery rate of reared jellyfish was 3.2%, with a total of 12,500 tons of reared jellyfish being caught. The maximum bell diameter of the jellyfish is around 70 centimetres (28 in) in mid-September, after which time the bell begins to shrink.

== Use as food ==
This jellyfish is a popular item of food in China and other southern and eastern Asian countries. It can be eaten raw as a salad and has a crisp texture. Cooking jellyfish requires skill because it shrinks at temperatures above 50 °C (122 °F). It is normally preserved by treatment with solutions of alum and salt. The excess salt needs to be removed before cooking. Various jellyfish foods are available on the Chinese market including artificial jellyfish products made largely from sodium alginate.

== Medicinal uses ==
Traditional Chinese medicine advocates the consumption of this jellyfish to treat arthritis, high blood pressure, asthma, burns, ulcers and other ailments; however, further research is needed to verify these claims. Protein isolated from R. esculentum has been shown to have antioxidant and insecticidal properties. Proteomic Analysis revealed that the R. esculentum venom consist of a high variety of putative toxins, including ShKT domain- and Kunitz domain- containing proteins which are potential therapeutic compounds.

== See also ==
- Jellyfish as food
