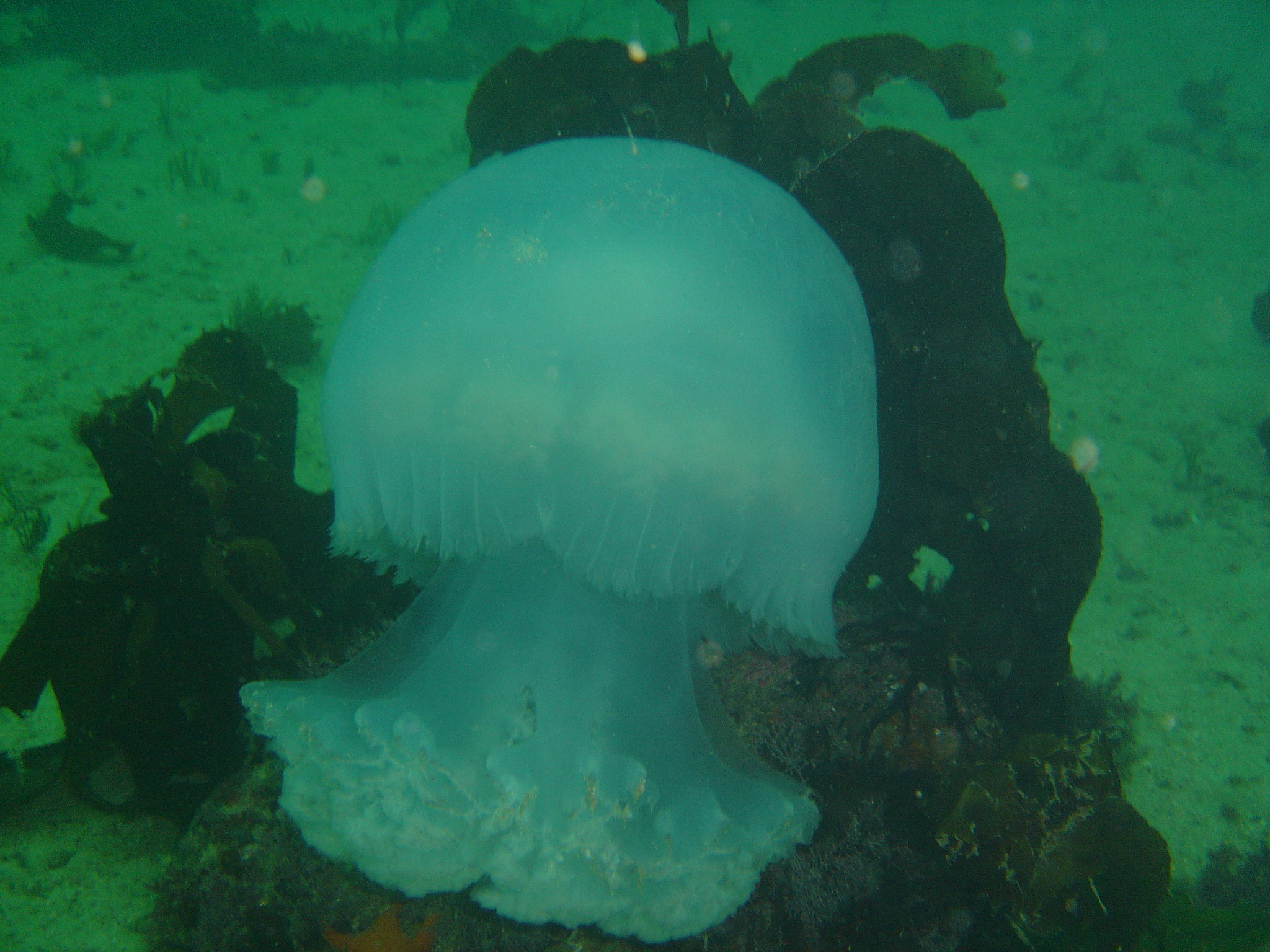
- At Long Beach, Simon's Town, South Africa

Scientific classification
- Kingdom: Animalia
- Phylum: Cnidaria
- Class: Scyphozoa
- Order: Rhizostomeae
- Family: Rhizostomatidae
- Genus: Eupilema
- Species: E. inexpectata

Binomial name
- Eupilema inexpectata Pages, Gili & Bouillon, 1992

= Eupilema inexpectata =

Species of jellyfish

The root-mouthed jellyfish (Eupilema inexpectata) is a species of cnidarian, a jellyfish in the small family Rhizostomatidae. It is the only member of the genus Eupilema.

== Description ==
This large jellyfish grows up to more than 1 m (3 ft 3 in) in diameter. It has a smooth-surfaced bell with no tentacles. Its large manubrium (mouth) has many microscopic holes which extend directly into the gut.

== Distribution ==
This jellyfish is found around the whole South African coast from the surface to at least 35 m (115 ft) underwater.

== Ecology ==
This is a large jellyfish which feeds on microscopic prey. It is often seen with small fish, which use its bulk to hide from predators.
