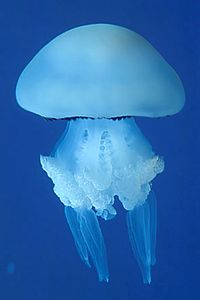
- Rhizostoma pulmo

Scientific classification
- Domain: Eukaryota
- Kingdom: Animalia
- Phylum: Cnidaria
- Class: Scyphozoa
- Order: Rhizostomeae
- Family: Rhizostomatidae
- Genus: Rhizostoma; Cuvier, 1800

Species
- R. pulmo; R. luteum; R. octopus

= Rhizostoma =

Genus of jellyfishes

Rhizostoma is a genus of medium to large rhizostomatid jellyfish found in the East Atlantic Ocean (North Sea and British Isles to South Africa) and Mediterranean Sea.
