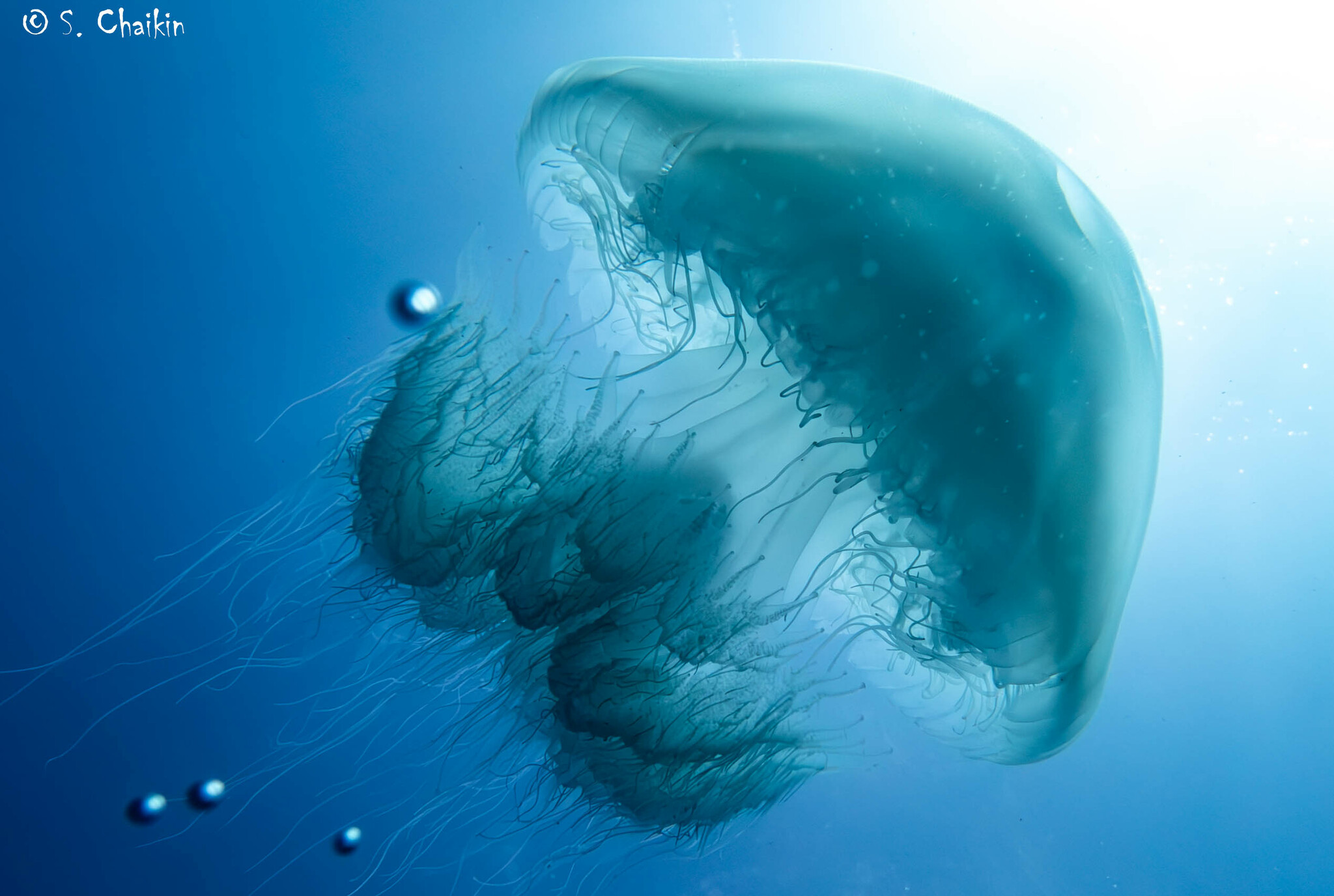

Scientific classification
- Kingdom: Animalia
- Phylum: Cnidaria
- Class: Scyphozoa
- Order: Rhizostomeae
- Family: Rhizostomatidae
- Genus: Rhopilema
- Species: R. nomadica

Binomial name
- Rhopilema nomadica Galil, 1990

= Rhopilema nomadica =

Species of jellyfish

Rhopilema nomadica, the nomad jellyfish, is a jellyfish indigenous to tropical warm waters of the Indian and Pacific Oceans. Since 1970's it has been also found in Mediterranean Sea, where it entered via the Suez Canal (Lessepsian migration). It has been found in the Eastern Mediterranean, off the coast of Lebanon, Israel, Gaza, Cyprus, Turkey, and in the Aegean Sea off the coast of Greece. R. nomadica's body is light blue and the bell is rounded. It can grow up to 10 kg of weight, and its bell is commonly 40–60 cm in diameter, but can be up to 90 cm. The European Union lists it as one of the worst invasive marine species in European waters.

== Effects on humans ==
R. nomadica can cause very painful injuries to humans, since it has vermicular filaments, which are covered in venomous stinging cells, in the mouth arms. The R. nomadica had caused the largest numbers of envenomisations along the southern Levant coast. These jellyfishes are notorious for the large swarms they form in the summertime. The R. nomadica have caused a socioeconomic problem in Israel because of such outbreaks, during which they can release their venomous stinging cells. The outbreak has caused seaside visits to be reduced from 3-10.5%, causing a monetary loss of $6 million for recreational beaches.

Their presence can clog up seawater intake systems, such as those used by seawater-cooled power plants.

== Nutrition ==
R. nomadica are planktotrophic, meaning that they feed off of plankton for their nutritional and also for their survival needs.

== Environmental Needs ==
R. nomadica are seen to survive in various water temperatures. They can survive from anywhere from 16 degree Celsius to 31 degree Celsius.
