= Rhopilema verrilli =

Scientific classification
- Kingdom: Animalia
- Phylum: Cnidaria
- Class: Scyphozoa
- Order: Rhizostomeae
- Family: Rhizostomatidae
- Genus: Rhopilema
- Species: R. verrilli

Binomial name
- Rhopilema verrilli (Fewkes, 1887)

Synonyms
- Nectopilema verrilli Fewkes, 1887

Species of jellyfish

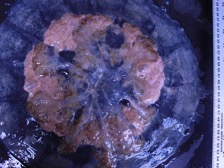
The underside of a mushroom jellyfish, showing the mouth, and oral arms

Rhopilema verrilli, the mushroom cap jellyfish, is a species of jellyfish in the family Rhizostomatidae. They are cnidarian invertebrates distinguished by their mushroom-shaped medusae. The species does not have any tentacles; however, they still have stinging cells, called nematocysts, within their bells, which can produce mild stings to humans.

== Taxonomy ==
"Mushroom cap jellyfish" and "sea mushroom jellyfish" are common names for the rare Rhopilema verrili. Their common name refers to the shape of the medusa, which resembles a mushroom cap. Rhopilema verrilli, originally Nectopilema verrilli, was named by Fewkes (1887) after a specimen found in the New Haven Harbor of Connecticut.

The mushroom jellyfish is often confused with the cannonball jellyfish. Both species lack tentacles, but the R. verrilli has finger-shaped arms, while the S. meleagris does not. The mushroom jellyfish is also much flatter, softer, and larger as it can be up to 51 cm or 20 inches in diameter. Conversely, the cannonball jellyfish is more roundish and has a slightly rougher umbrella that is brownish on the edge and grows up to 25 cm or 10 inches in diameter.

== Description ==
The diameter of Rhopilema verrilli ranges from 35 to 50 cm; the maximum size found is 51 cm in bell diameter. The bell is gelatinous, mushroom-shaped, and translucent. The bell ranges from a variety of colors such as white to light yellow, brown, blue, pink or green. The margins of the bell usually have a very light-brown pigmentation. Laterally, the species has a reddish-brown pigmentation from the organs underneath such as the pinkish digestive glands. The mushroom jellyfish lack tentacles; instead, they have 8 oral arms with finger-shaped appendages with nematocyst warts underneath the middle of the umbrella. The arms are brownish in color. The species has 8 rhopalia, which are small pink structures located around the bell margin. Each rhopalium contains a gravity sensor, allowing the jellyfish to tell its orientation and direction. This jellyfish also has 8 radial canals. The radial canals along with the stomach form the gastroendodermal system.

== Distribution and habitat ==
Rhopilema verrilli are distributed throughout the Western Atlantic of the U.S. and Canada, but they reside mostly along the coast in the northern Gulf of Mexico, and between North Carolina and New England. They sometimes occur inshore in mouths of estuaries. During the fall and early winter, they may enter into the lower Chesapeake Bay. The species are distributed along the latitude coordinates: 18.21 degrees (min) and 38.32 degrees (max) and longitude coordinates: -97.8 degrees (min) and -76.5 degrees (max).

== Behavior ==
The mushroom jellyfish survive off of tiny plankton parts, which are pushed out of their umbrella by the water and are caught with their finger-like appendages.

R. verrilli do not present a stinging threat to humans because they do not have tentacles but stinging cells that reside inside their bells.

== Life cycle ==
Cnidarians have life cycles that alternate between asexual polyps and sexual medusa. However, the class Scyphozoan jellyfishes live most of their life cycles as a medusa. R. verrilli, belonging to the class Scyphozoa, are gonochoric or unisexual. The life cycle starts off by the adult medusa laying an egg. After fertilization, the egg develops into a free-living larva, or planula. The planula floats around until it attaches itself onto a hard substrate, metamorphosing itself into a polyp called, scyphistoma. The scyphistoma will reproduce asexually through budding, and transform into a strobila. Each stroblia matures into an ephryae, an immature form of a medusa. When they mature and break away from the other stroblia, the ephryae finally becomes an adult medusa.

== Human interactions ==
Commercial fishermen consider R. verrilli and S. meleagris as pests, but R. verrilli are less of a problem than S. meleagris. The mushroom jellyfishes are served pickled, or dried out into paste in Asian countries such as China and Japan.

The taxon for Rhopilema has not yet been assessed for the IUCN Red List.
