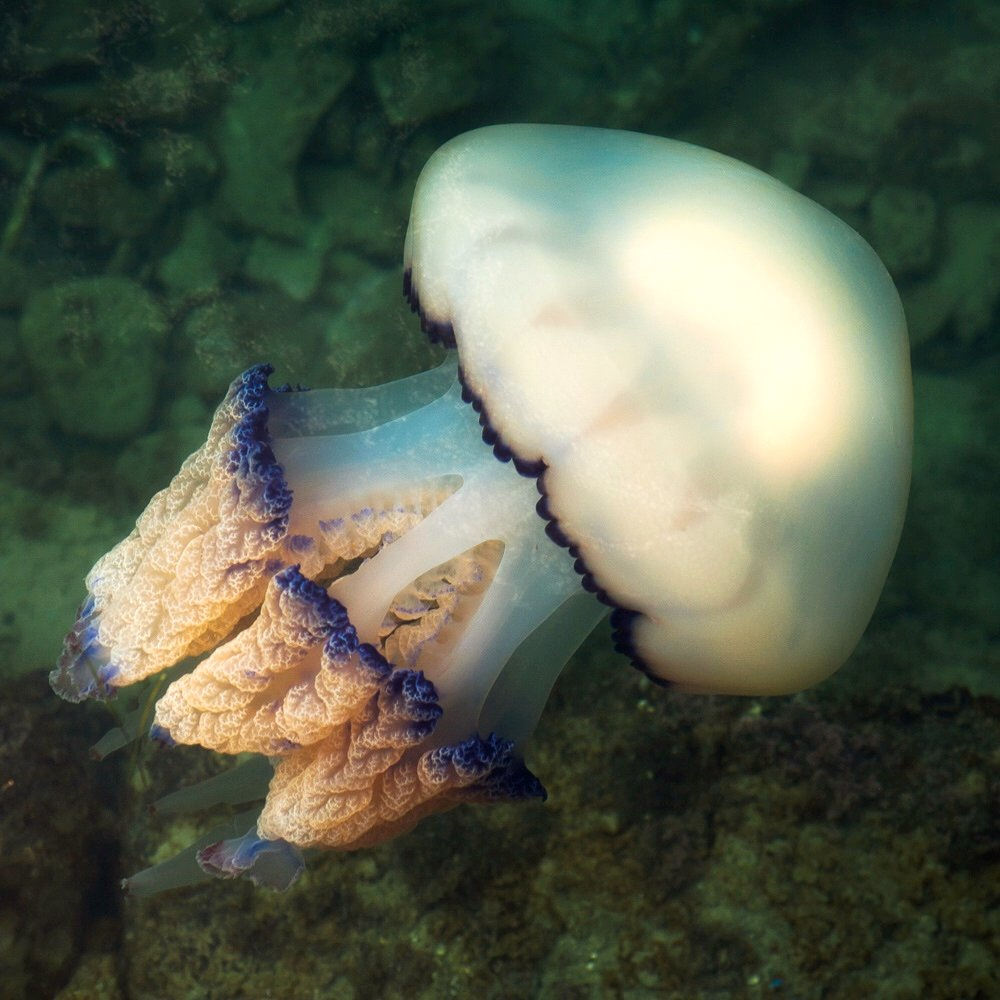
- Rhizostoma pulmo

Scientific classification
- Kingdom: Animalia
- Phylum: Cnidaria
- Class: Scyphozoa
- Order: Rhizostomeae
- Family: Rhizostomatidae
- Genus: Rhizostoma
- Species: R. pulmo

Binomial name
- Rhizostoma pulmo Macri, 1778

Synonyms
- Medusa pulmo Gmelin, 1788; Rhizostoma Aldrovandi Péron & Lesueur, 1810

= Rhizostoma pulmo =

Species of jellyfish

Rhizostoma pulmo, commonly known as the barrel jellyfish, the dustbin-lid jellyfish or the frilly-mouthed jellyfish, is a scyphomedusa in the family Rhizostomatidae. It is found in the northeast Atlantic, and in the Mediterranean Sea, Black Sea and Sea of Azov. It is also known from the southern Atlantic off the western South African coast and into False Bay. They are found typically in late summer, and early fall in increased populations, known as blooms. This is due to higher temperatures and other environmental factors such as wind.

R. pulmo is common in the Irish Sea, and is typically up to 40 cm (16 in) in diameter, but can exceptionally reach 150 cm (59 in) in length or larger,making it the largest jellyfish in British and Irish waters. (Cyanea capillata, the Lion's Mane jellyfish, reaches an even larger size, but is generally smaller in Britain). The species can grow up to one meter (3.2 feet) and weigh up to 25 kilograms (55 lbs).

Rhizostoma pulmo is moderately venomous compared to other species. Effects include a mild burning sensation on the skin, dermatitis, and ulcers which confirms it is toxic but does not pose a serious threat to humans.

It is a favourite food of the leatherback turtle.

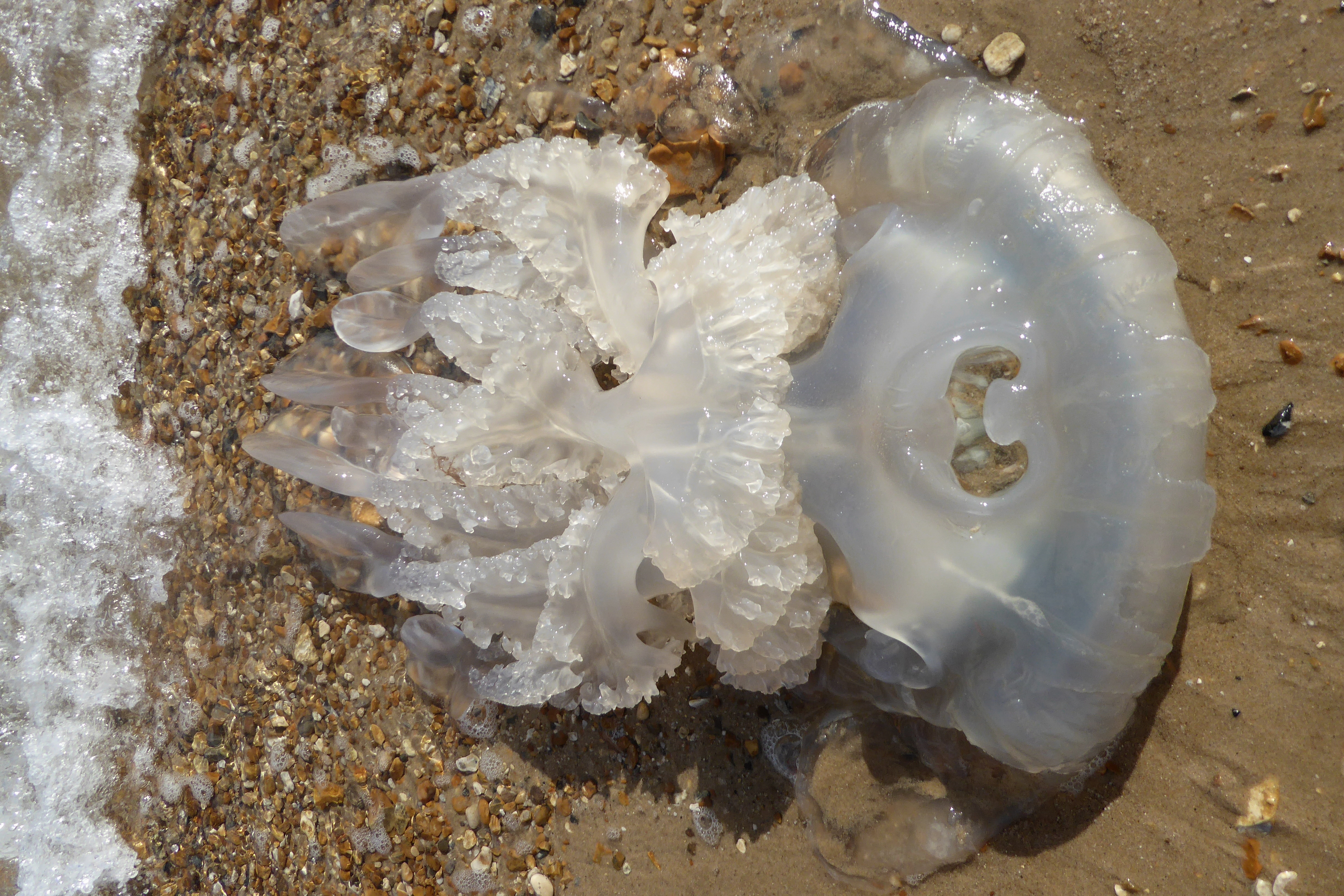
Rhizostoma pulmo washed ashore at Bournemouth in southern England

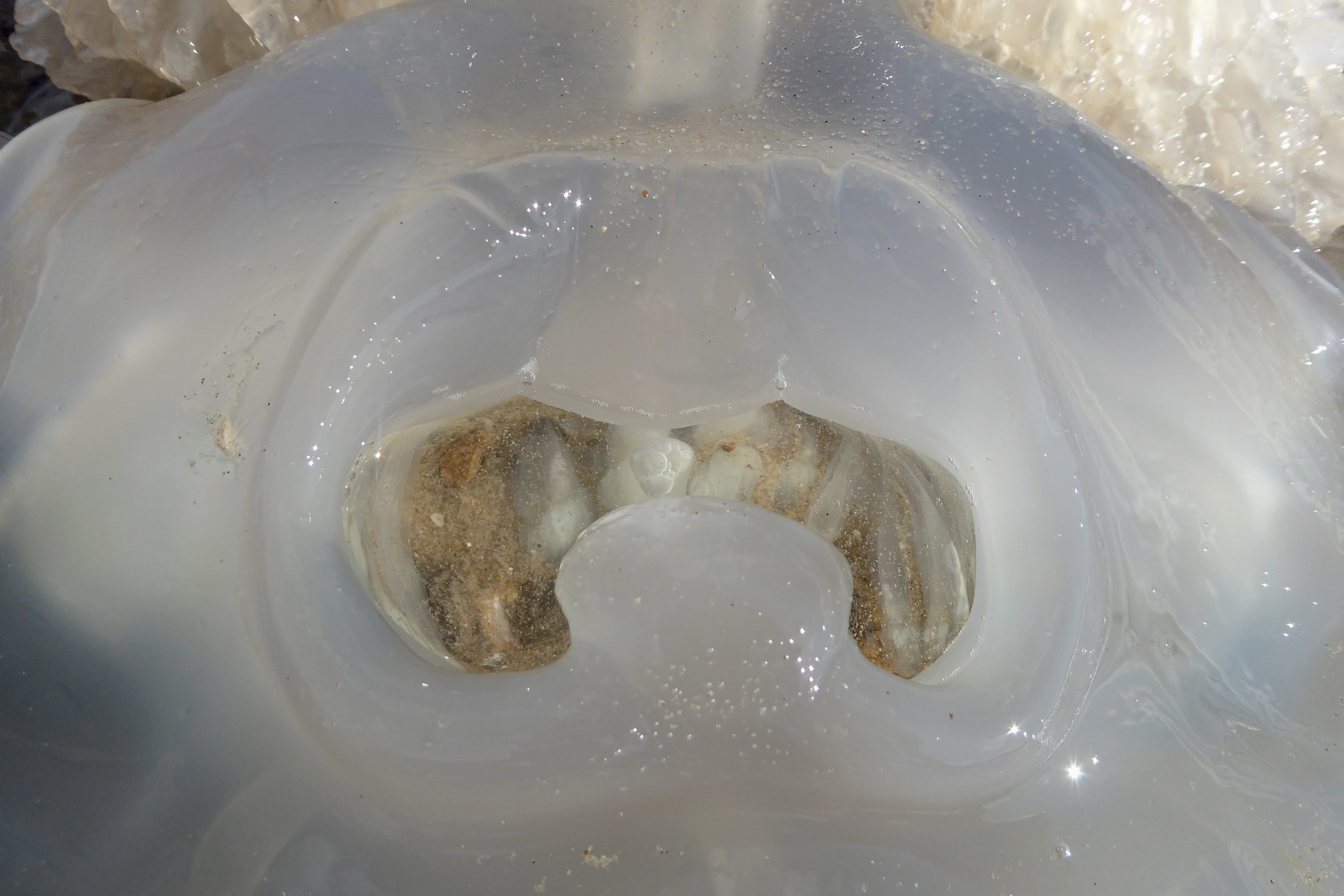
Orifice of a barrel jellyfish

In south-east Asia, rhizostome jellyfish are a source of bioactive compounds used in traditional food and medicine. One study indicates that washing in aqueous solutions and the separation of high molecular weight proteins from the extract, e.g., by membrane filtration, could be a way to remove possible toxic compounds from jellyfish extracts and to concentrate potentially bioactive soluble compounds. The potentially active soluble components may have uses as nutraceutical and cosmeceutical ingredients.
