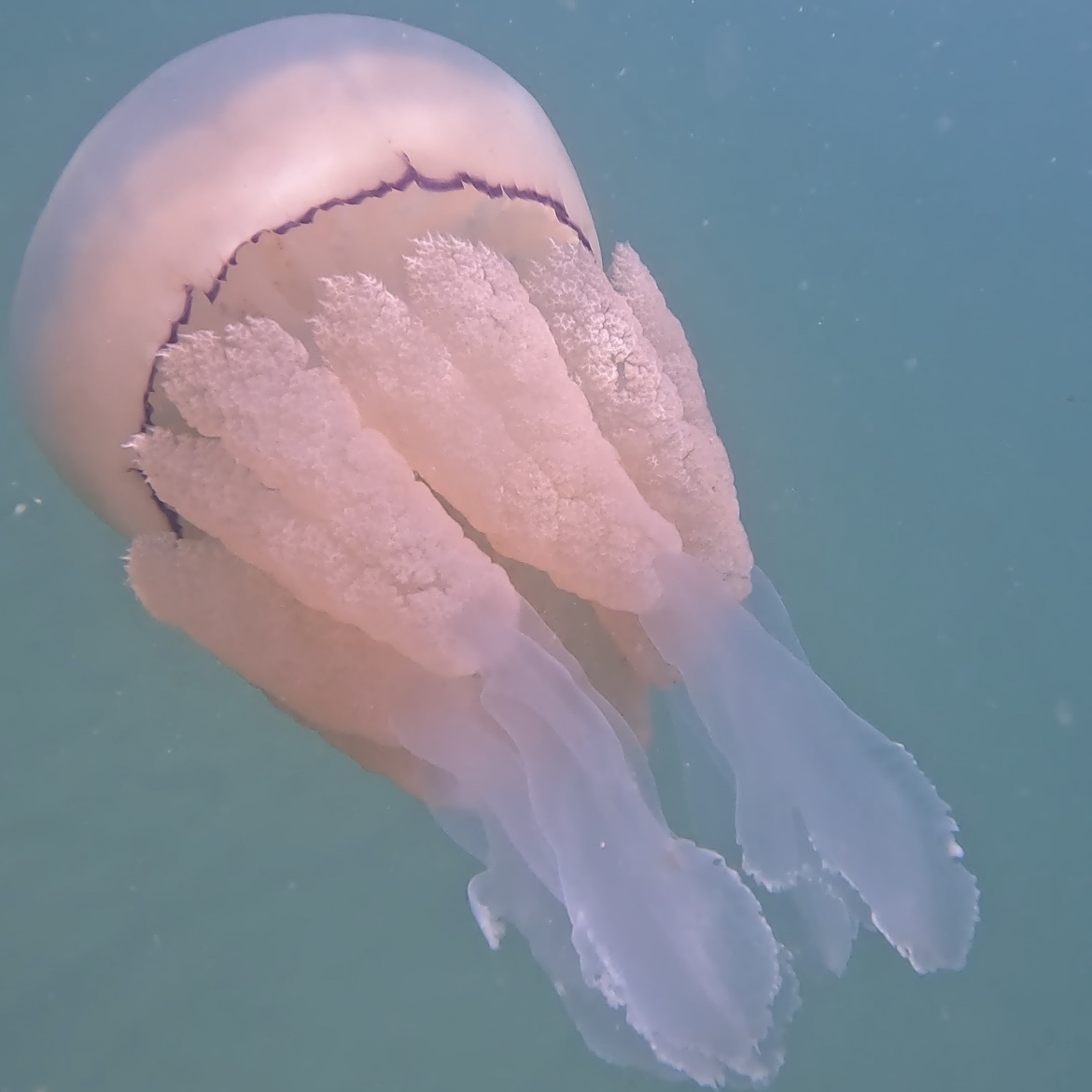

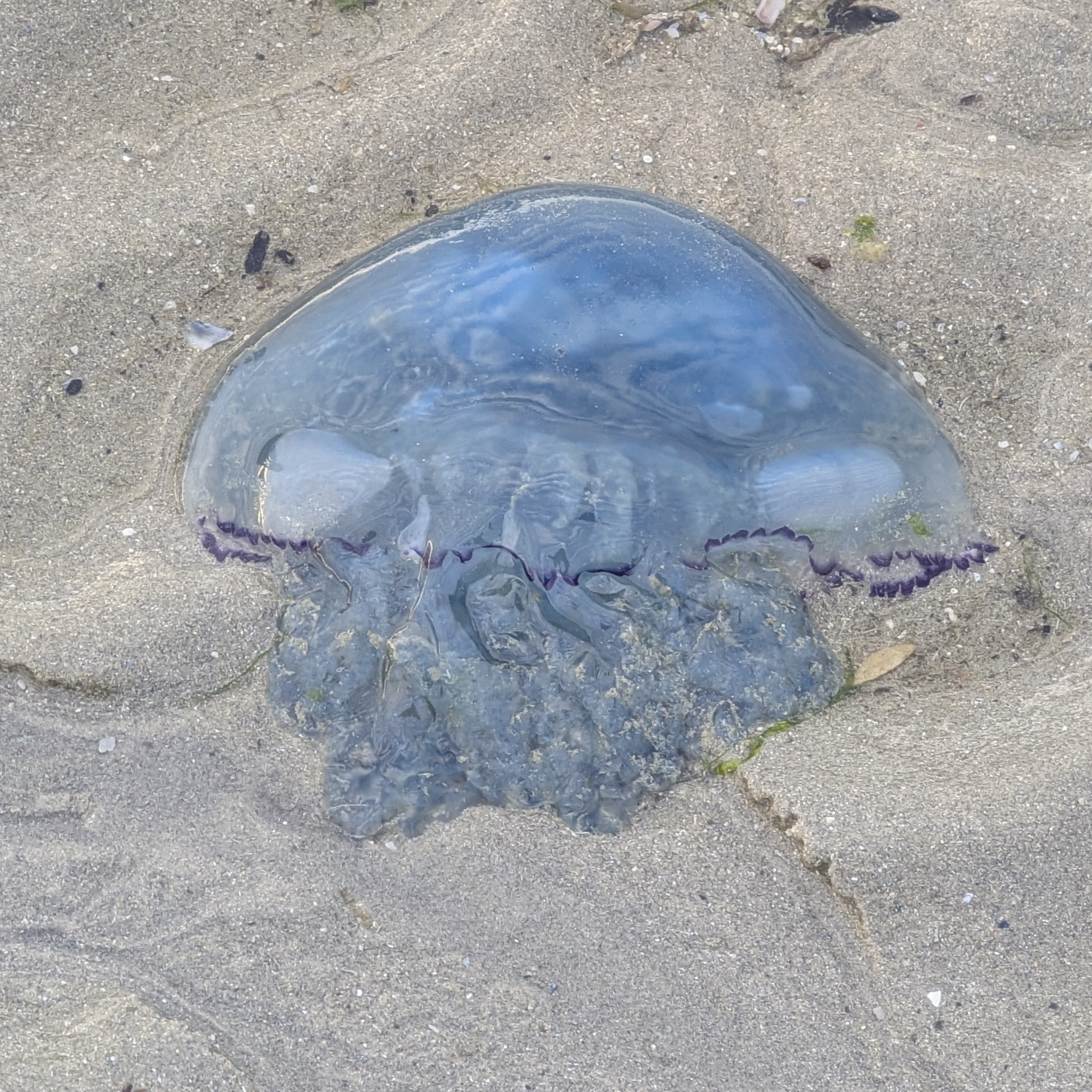

Scientific classification
- Kingdom: Animalia
- Phylum: Cnidaria
- Class: Scyphozoa
- Order: Rhizostomeae
- Family: Rhizostomatidae
- Genus: Rhizostoma
- Species: R. octopus

Binomial name
- Rhizostoma octopus Gmelin, 1791

= Rhizostoma octopus =

Marine invertebrate

Rhizostoma octopus is a species of rhizostomatid jellyfish. They are most commonly found in the English Channel, the North Sea, and the North Atlantic up to the Norwegian Sea.

Predators include leatherback sea turtles. These jellyfish are harvested as a natural source of collagen.
