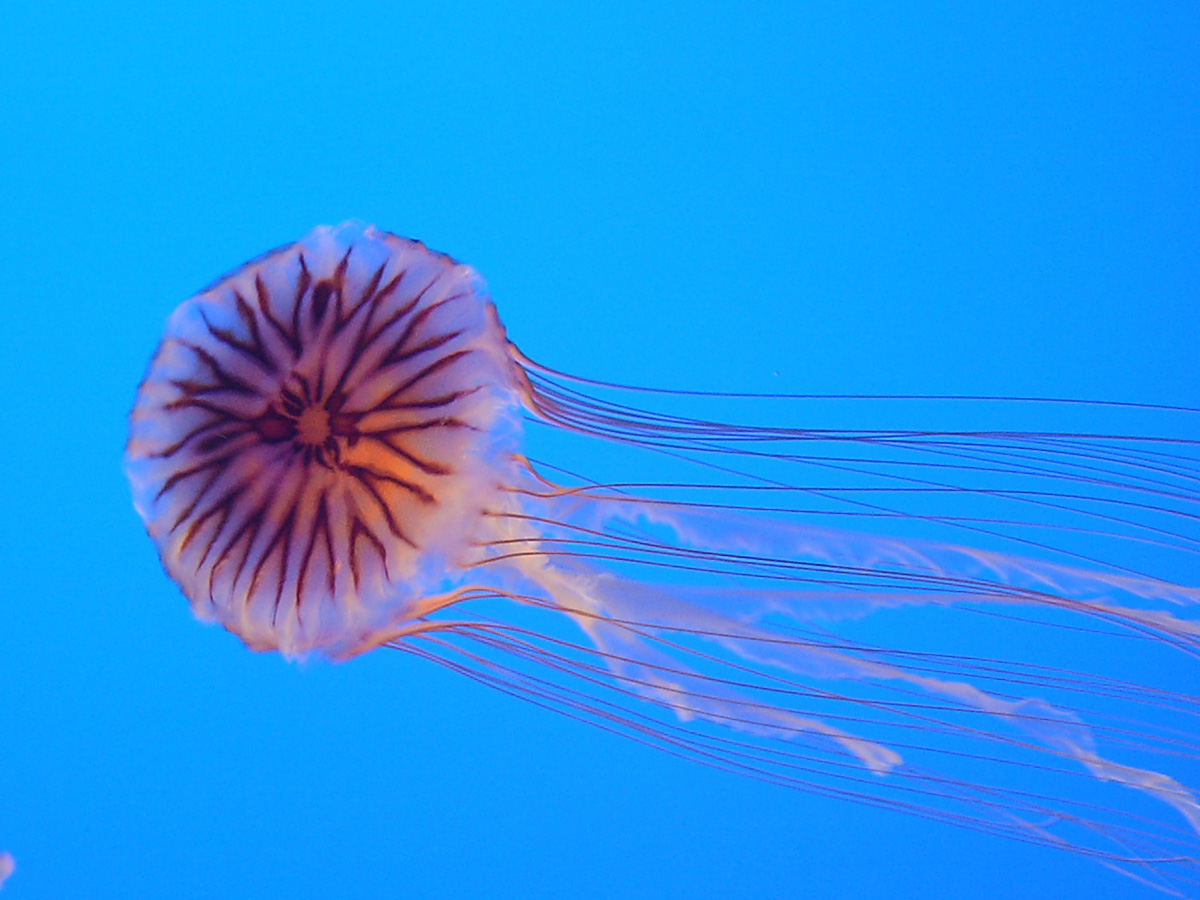

Scientific classification
- Kingdom: Animalia
- Phylum: Cnidaria
- Class: Scyphozoa
- Order: Semaeostomeae
- Family: Pelagiidae
- Genus: Chrysaora
- Species: C. pacifica

Binomial name
- Chrysaora pacifica (Goette, 1886)

Synonyms
- Kuragea depressa Kishinouye, 1902

= Chrysaora pacifica =

Species of jellyfish

Chrysaora pacifica, commonly named the Japanese sea nettle, is a jellyfish in the family Pelagiidae.

== Description ==
The medusae of C. pacifica typically has a bell with a diameter of 15–21 cm (5.9–8.3 in). The bell is divided into eight sections. The outer exumbrella is finely granulated, with 32 reddish colored radial stripes. The inner mesoglea of the bell is translucent and thickest in the central portion, thinning around the edges.

The central mouth of the jelly has four oral arms that are 2-3 times longer than the diameter of the bell. These delicate, curtain-like arms have finely fringed margins covered in nematocyst warts. Along the margin of the bell are 40 tentacles that are elastic and grow to be a similar length to the oral arms.

== Distribution ==
C. pacifica is found across the northwest Pacific Ocean, including Japan, Korea, Taiwan, and China.

This species was formerly confused with the larger and more northerly distributed C. melanaster. As a consequence, individuals kept in public aquariums have often been mislabeled as C. melanaster.

Within C. pacifica's range, it surivives best in water temperatures from 20-24°C.

== Biology ==
If the jellyfish sustains injuries, it goes through a process of symmetrization, in which it restructures its figure by moving around existing parts, and not by recreating the ones lost to maintain balance.

C. pacifica's sting is strong and can be dangerous to humans.
