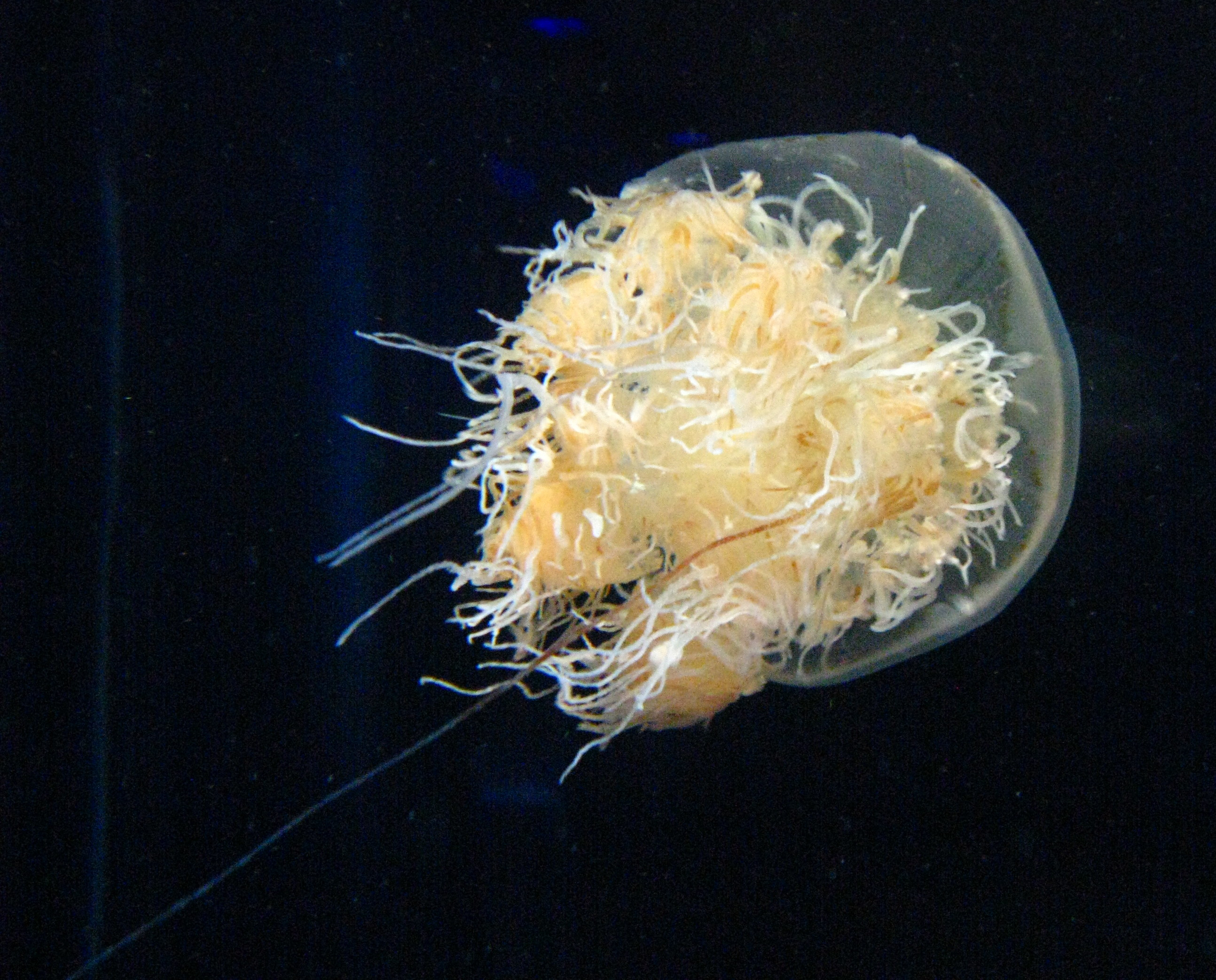
- Nemopilema nomurai in the Kaiyūkan-aquarium of Ōsaka
- Size comparison of a Nomura's jellyfish next to a diver

Scientific classification
- Kingdom: Animalia
- Phylum: Cnidaria
- Class: Scyphozoa
- Order: Rhizostomeae
- Family: Rhizostomatidae
- Genus: Nemopilema; Kishinouye, 1922
- Species: N. nomurai

Binomial name
- Nemopilema nomurai (Kishinouye, 1922)

Synonyms
- Stomolophus nomurai

= Nomura's jellyfish =

Species of jellyfish

Nomura's jellyfish (エチゼンクラゲ, echizen kurage; Nemopilema nomurai) is a very large rhizostome jellyfish, in the same size class as the lion's mane jellyfish, the largest cnidarian in the world. It is edible but not considered high quality. It is the only species in the monotypic genus Nemopilema. Commonly found in the waters of East Asia, they can negatively affect fisheries due to their large size and quantity. As a form of combating the large blooms, recent studies attempt to find new uses for the large jellyfish such as studying its venom for medical applications.

== Description ==
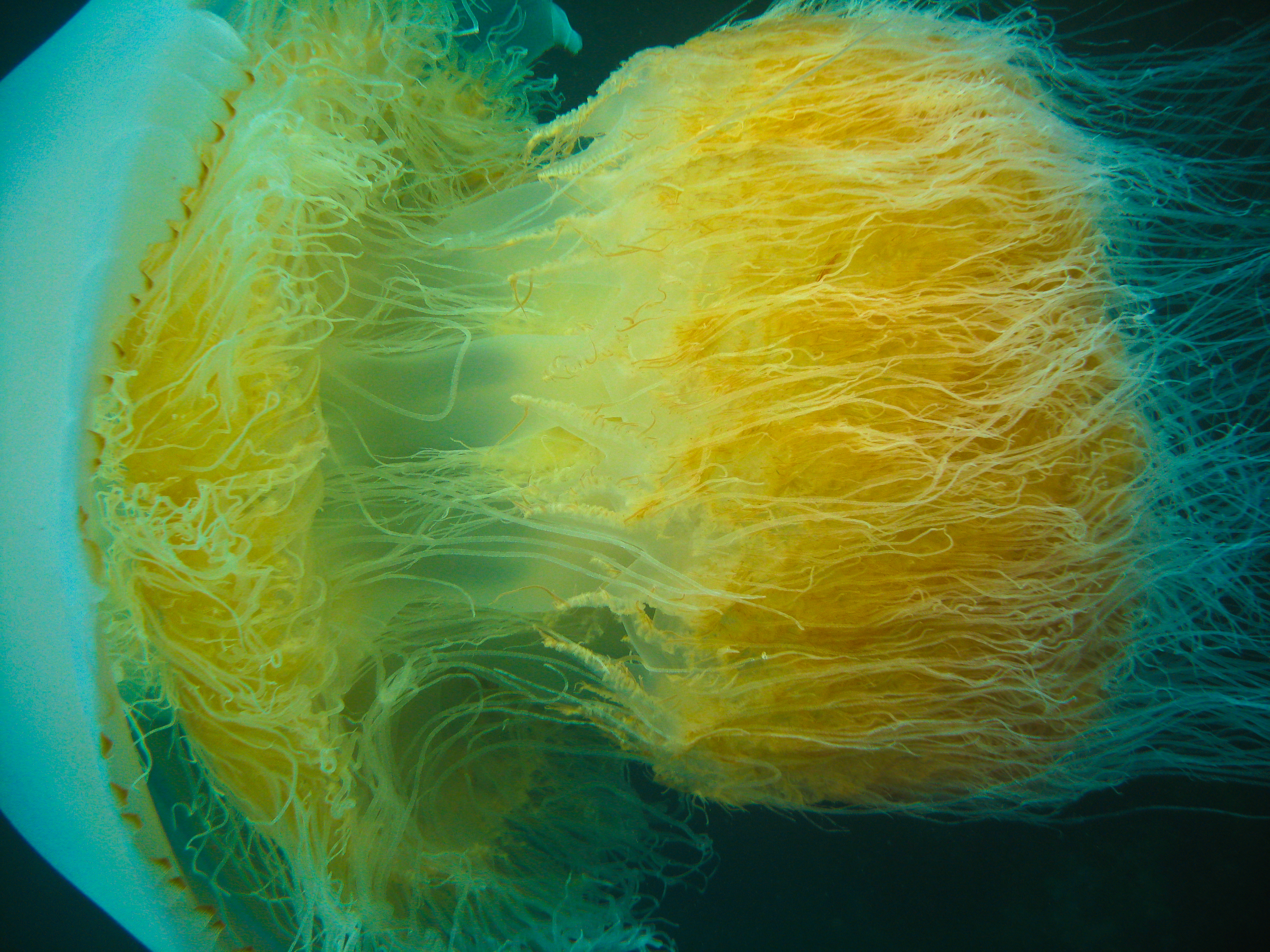
A Nomura jellyfish at Little Munsom Island, Jeju-do, South Korea

Nemopilema nomurai can grow up to 2 m (6 ft 7 in) in diameter and weigh up to 200 kg (440 lb), the diameter when fully grown is slightly greater than the height of an average human. The species was named in tribute to Mr. Kan'ichi Nomura (C18–C19), Director General of the Fukui Prefectural Fisheries Experimental Station, who in early December 1921 sent a specimen in a 72-litre (16 imp gal; 19 US gal) wooden tank to Professor Kishinouye, who found that it was unknown and dedicated time to study the living specimens.

Nemopilema nomurai caught around Tsushima and the Iki Islands have a translucent whitish body, with pinkish or reddish capulets and oral arms, and transparent immature gonads. Jellyfish have two main types of muscle: epitheliomuscular cells and striated muscle cells. Researchers found that gene families that are closely associated with striated muscle were expressed in the bell portion of the jellyfish, providing evidence that striated muscle plays a significant role in jellyfish motility.

== Distribution ==
Nomura's jellyfish reside primarily in the waters between China and Japan, primarily centralized in the Yellow Sea and East China Sea. Population blooms appeared to be increasing with frequency in the time period of 1989–2009. Possible reasons for the population increase in Nomura's Jellyfish include climate change, overfishing, and coastal modification adding substrate for asexually producing polyps.

== Life cycle ==
The life cycle of Nemopilema nomurai is very similar to that of other rhizostomes. Nomura's jellyfish are normally found in the Yellow Sea and populations are generally maintained there year round. During June and July, changes in the water salinity lead to the expatriation of larval stage jellyfish via the Tsushima strait. In 2005 the largest blooms were in late October. It is noted that this species of jellyfish in six months can grow from the size of a grain of rice to greater than 6 ft (1.8 m) wide.

== Ecology ==
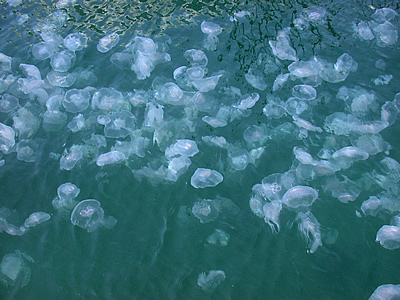
Example of a jellyfish bloom

This species of jellyfish feeds mostly on zooplankton in all stages of life, feeding on larger fish as they grow larger. Their only predators consist of swordfish, tuna, sunfish, leatherback turtles, and humans.

=== Jellyfish Blooms ===
While jellyfish blooms have been documented in the Sea of Japan since the writing of their first history book, the blooms of Nemopilema nomurai have been more recent. Since the beginning of the 20th century the instances of N. nomurai explosive blooms have been on the increase, a fact not helped by their size — being one of the largest species of jellyfish recorded. The largest N. nomurai blooms have been documented between the years of 2002 - 2003, during the time in which these blooms took place it was observed that the fishing industry was affected negatively. The effects of the blooms can be seen in an event that took place in 2009, when a 10 tonnes (11 tons) fishing trawler, the Diasan Shinsho-maru, capsized off Chiba on Tokyo Bay as its three-man crew tried to haul in a net containing dozens of Nomura's jellyfish; the three were rescued by another trawler.

== Envenomations ==
Severe envenomations are becoming more common than ever. Victims of a sting from the N. Nomurai jellyfish may present symptoms of itching, swelling, acute pain, local erythrosis, and inflammation; in severe cases, the envenomations can cause death. Recent research has also revealed that the myotoxicity caused by the presence of Nemopilema nomurai nematocyst venom (NnNV) in the body, which leads to Oedematogenic effects on the victims skin as well as resulting in the necrosis of the muscle tissue in some cases can be prohibited by metalloproteinase inhibitors such as batimastat (BMT) and ethylenediaminetetraacetic acid (EDTA). The nematocyst venom of the N. nomurai is composed of complex, toxic mixtures of proteins. Further research is in progress to determine the key factors within these protein mixtures, which could predict specific symptoms from the venom and aid in treatment. Using experimental omics-based approaches, research has revealed different sting related proteins and enzymatic components such as metalloproteinase and phospholipase A2s, as well as differences in hemolytic activity. However, research has yet to provide a correlation between these components and symptoms of the envenomation.

== Uses ==
Since the recent increase in blooms, research has been underway to find uses for Nomura's jellyfish. Each year this species costs Japanese fisheries serious damage and so an economic solution may be found in converting this invasion into a resource.

=== As food ===
The Japanese company Tango Jersey Dairy produces a vanilla and jellyfish ice cream using Nomura's jellyfish. Consuming Echizen Kurage is potentially dangerous if the toxic part is not thoroughly cleaned and cooked.

=== Medical ===
One patent suggested the use of mucin of the Nomura's jellyfish to treat joint diseases such as osteoarthritis, although clinical data are lacking. Although more research in the field is required, in recent cancer related studies it has been shown that Nemopilema nomurai jellyfish venom (NnV) can inhibit epithelial-mesenchymal transition (EMT) in HepG2 cells. EMT aids in the early stages of metastasis, which is most commonly seen in cancer, and causes the cells to develop cancer like properties. The study conducted showed that when cells with EMT were treated with NnV, it had a hindering effect on the EMT and the cancer like properties of the cells.

=== Agriculture ===
Like many invasive species, such as the cane toad, a simple solution is to take the species and convert them into fertilizer. Another study aimed at using an aqueous methanol extract of dried medusa to inhibit the growth of weed seedlings when added to the soil.
