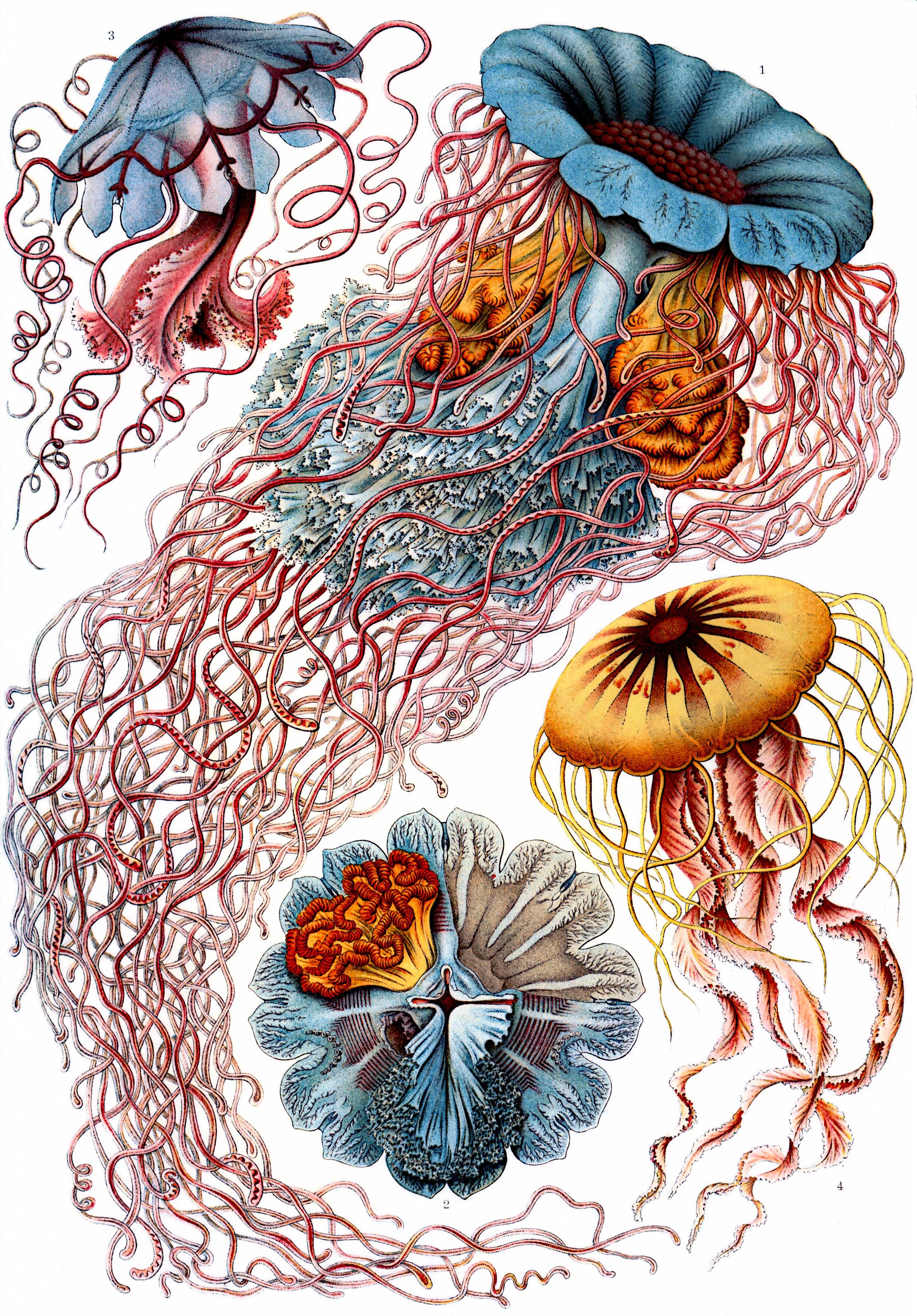
- "Discomedusae" (all semaeostomids), 8th print of Ernst Haeckel's Kunstformen der Natur, 1904

Scientific classification
- Kingdom: Animalia
- Phylum: Cnidaria
- Class: Scyphozoa
- Subclass: Discomedusae; Haeckel, 1880

= Discomedusae =

Subclass of jellyfishes

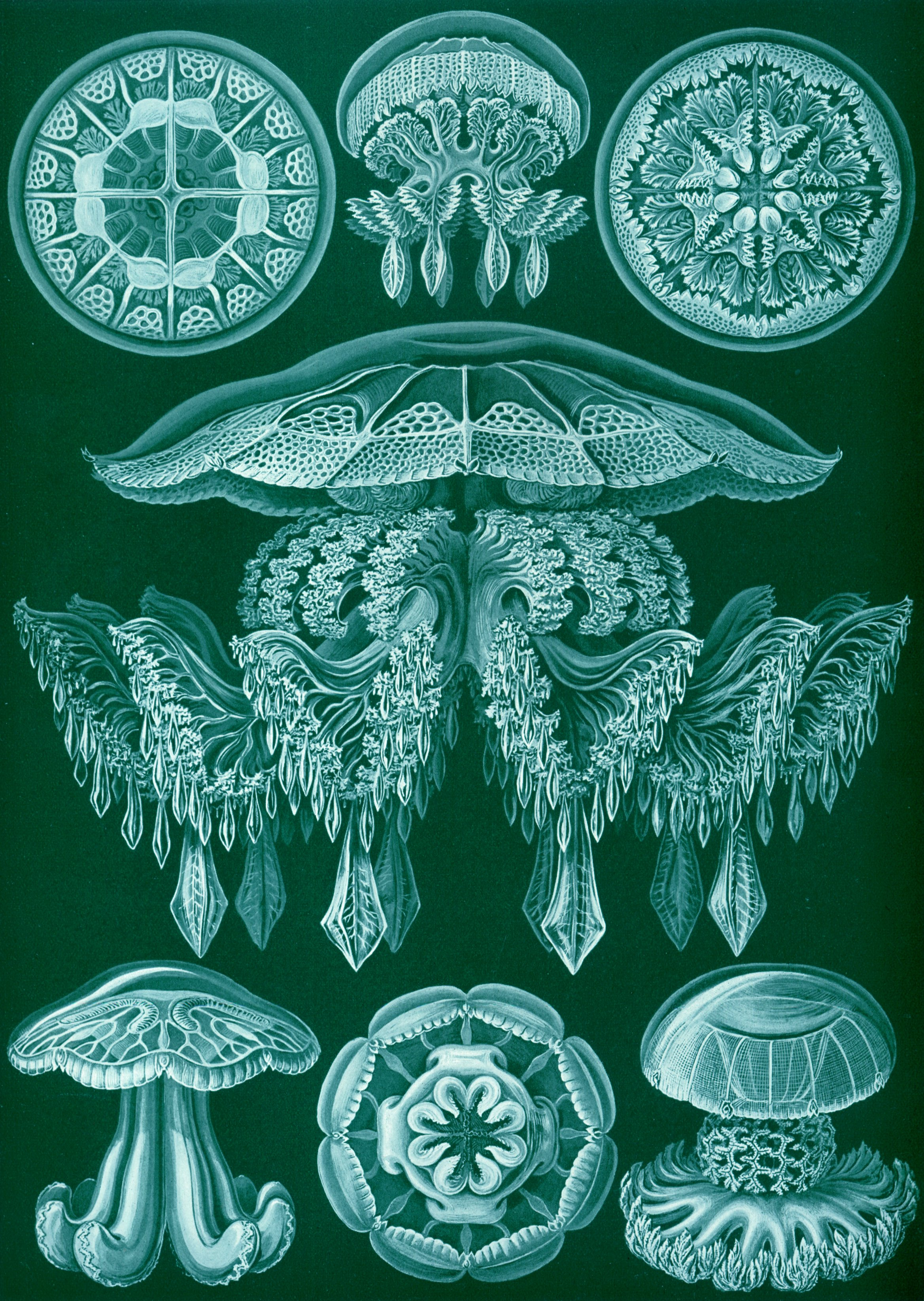
"Discomedusae" (all rhizostomids), 88th print of Ernst Haeckel's Kunstformen der Natur, 1904

Discomedusae is a subclass of jellyfish in the class Scyphozoa. It is the sister taxon of Coronamedusae. Discomedusae contains about 155 named species and there are likely to be many more as yet undescribed. Jellyfish in this subclass are much more likely to have swarming events or form blooms than those in Coronamedusae. Discomedusae consists of two orders, Rhizostomeae and Semaeostomeae.

== Rhizostomeae ==
Members of the order Rhizostomeae are collectively known as "root-mouth jellies" and are very diverse. They do not have tentacles or other structures at the edge of the bell, instead they have eight oral arms which fuse together to form the manubrium, a central organ with the mouth at its tip, resembling an elephant's trunk. Some have numerous manubrial outgrowths, well-armed with cnidocytes and mucus-secreting cells; others have the central manubrial mouth closed, instead making use of secondary mouths at the side of the manubrium. These adaptations give the jellyfish a large surface area with which to collect large quantities of planktonic organisms. It can trap plankton from the water currents it produces by pulsating.

== Semaeostomeae ==
Members of the Semaeostomeae are known as "flag-mouth jellies" and are large jellyfish. They have an elongate manubrium composed of four oral arms. The edge of the bell bears flaps known as lappets and in the niches between these, there are usually eight rhopalia (sensory organs). Sometimes there are also hollow marginal tentacles. The stomach is subdivided into four gastric pouches, with the four gonads situated on the oral walls of the pouches. Some semaeostomids are suspension feeders, but others supplement this with prey such as small fish, crustaceans, worms and other jellyfish. The pulsating action of the bell is linked by a nerve ring to the sensory inputs received by the rhopalia.

== Phylogeny ==
According to the World Register of Marine Species, Discomedusae contains the following taxa:

- Order Rhizostomeae
  - Suborder Daktyliophorae
    - Family Catostylidae
    - Family Lobonematidae
    - Family Lychnorhizidae
    - Family Rhizostomatidae
    - Family Stomolophidae
  - Suborder Kolpophorae
    - Family Cassiopeidae
    - Family Cepheidae
    - Family Mastigiidae
    - Family Thysanostomatidae
    - Family Versurigidae
- Order Semaeostomeae
    - Family Cyaneidae
    - Family Drymonematidae
    - Family Pelagiidae
    - Family Phacellophoridae
    - Family Ulmaridae
