= Maculopapular rash =

Skin rash of small, raised red bumps

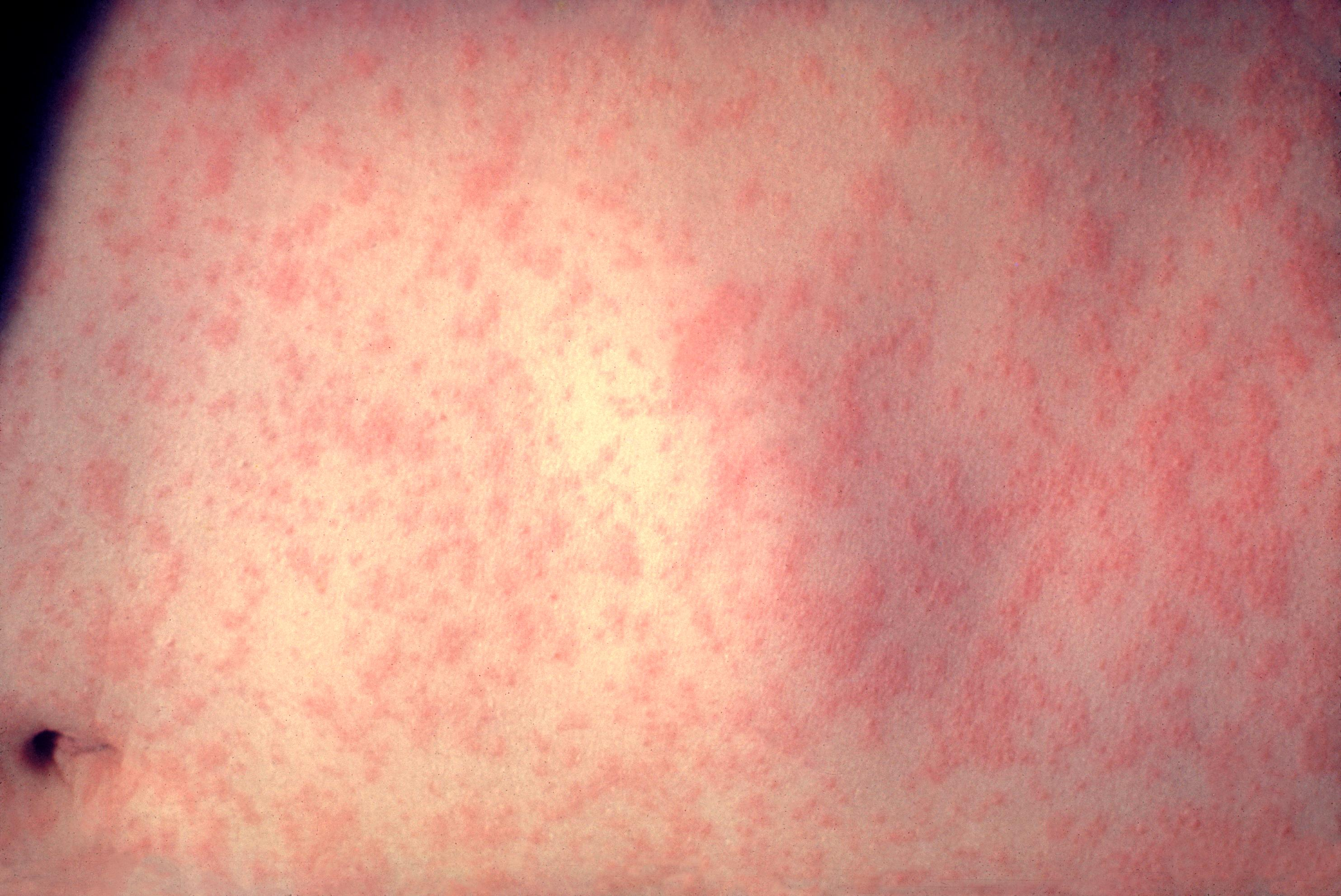
Maculopapular rash on the abdomen after three days of measles infection

A maculopapular rash is a type of rash characterized by a flat, red area on the skin that is covered with small confluent bumps. It may only appear red in lighter-skinned people. The term "maculopapular" is a compound: macules are small, flat discolored spots on the surface of the skin; and papules are small, raised bumps. It is also described as erythematous, or red.

This type of rash is common in several diseases and medical conditions, including scarlet fever, measles, Ebola, rubella, HIV, secondary syphilis (congenital syphilis, which is asymptomatic, the newborn may present this type of rash), erythrovirus (parvovirus B19), chikungunya (alphavirus), Zika fever, smallpox (which has been eradicated), varicella (when vaccinated persons exhibit symptoms from the modified form), heat rash, and sometimes dengue fever. It is also a common manifestation of a skin reaction to the antibiotic amoxicillin or chemotherapy drugs. Cutaneous infiltration of leukemic cells may also have this appearance. Maculopapular rash is seen in graft-versus-host disease (GVHD) developed after a hematopoietic stem cell transplant (bone marrow transplant), which can be seen within one week or several weeks after the transplant. In the case of GVHD, the maculopapular lesions may progress to a condition similar to toxic epidermal necrolysis. In addition, this is the type of rash that some patients presenting with Ebola virus hemorrhagic (EBO-Z) fever will reveal but can be hard to see on dark skin people. It is also seen in patients with Marburg hemorrhagic fever, a filovirus not unlike Ebola.

This type of rash can be as a result of large doses of niacin or no-flush niacin (2000 – 2500 mg), used for the management of low HDL cholesterol.

This type of rash can also be a symptom of sea bather's eruption. This stinging, pruritic, maculopapular rash affects swimmers in some Atlantic locales (such as Florida, the Caribbean, and Long Island). It is caused by hypersensitivity to stings from the larvae of the sea anemone (Edwardsiella lineata) or the thimble jellyfish (Linuche unguiculata). The rash appears where the bathing suit contacts the skin.

This type of rash can also be a symptom of acute arsenic intoxication, appearing two weeks later.

== See also ==
- List of cutaneous conditions
