= Mastigias ocellatus =

Scientific classification
- Domain: Eukaryota
- Kingdom: Animalia
- Phylum: Cnidaria
- Class: Scyphozoa
- Order: Rhizostomeae
- Family: Mastigiidae
- Genus: Mastigias
- Species: M. ocellatus

Binomial name
- Mastigias ocellatus (Modeer, 1791)

Synonyms
- Medusa ocellata Modeer, 1791; Versura palmata Haeckel, 1880

Species of jellyfish

Mastigias ocellatus, the golden medusa, is a species of jellyfish in the family Mastigiidae. It is native to the southern Pacific Ocean.

== Etymology ==
The specific epithet is derived from the Latin ocellatus, "having small eyes", referring to the white spots on the edge of the bell that appear similar to small eyes.

== Description ==
The medusa of Mastigias ocellatus grows to a diameter of about 15 cm (6 in). The surface of the bell is sculptured with small, polygonal nematocyst warts. There are 96 marginal lappets and eight three-winged mouth arms, terminating in a bare, club-shaped extremity, the tip of which is blue. The bell is reddish-brown, with white spots near the edge, each with a brown centre and margin.

== Distribution ==
Mastigias ocellatus occurs in October in the southern Pacific Ocean. It is a pelagic species, and its method of reproduction has not been studied.
