= Mastigias sidereus =

Scientific classification
- Kingdom: Animalia
- Phylum: Cnidaria
- Class: Scyphozoa
- Order: Rhizostomeae
- Family: Mastigiidae
- Genus: Mastigias
- Species: M. sidereus

Binomial name
- Mastigias sidereus Chun, 1896

Synonyms
- Mastigias siderea (alternative representation)

Species of jellyfish

Mastigias sidereus is a species of jellyfish in the family Mastigiidae. It is native to the southern Pacific Ocean.

== Description ==
The medusa of M. sidereus grows to a diameter of about 70 mm (3 in). There are about 60 marginal lappets and the surface of the bell is sculptured with deep radial furrows between these. The eight mouth arms are as long as the diameter of the bell, terminating in club-shaped filaments. There are seven radial canals which link to the ring canal. The bell is pale yellowish-brown with white spots; these are small near the margin but larger over the ring canal. The mouth arms are brown, spotted with white, and the terminal filaments are yellowish.

== Distribution ==
M. sidereus occurs in the southern Pacific Ocean. It is a pelagic species, and its method of reproduction has not been studied.
