= Stomolophus fritillarius =

Scientific classification
- Kingdom: Animalia
- Phylum: Cnidaria
- Class: Scyphozoa
- Order: Rhizostomeae
- Family: Stomolophidae
- Genus: Stomolophus
- Species: S. fritillarius

Binomial name
- Stomolophus fritillarius Haeckel, 1880

Synonyms
- Stomolophus fritillaria Haeckel, 1880

Species of jellyfish

Stomolophus fritillarius is a species of true jellyfish in the family Stomolophidae. It is on occasion, collectively with Stomolophus meleagris, referred to as the cannonball jellyfish.

== Description ==
Stomolophus fritillarius can grow to up to 90 mm (3.5 in) wide in bell diameter. Its bell margin is not constricted. It has around 24 velar lappets in each octant of its bell, with grooves of alternating length between each. It has short scapulets, or secondary mouth-folds, which are hidden under its bell.
