= Mastigias andersoni =

Scientific classification
- Kingdom: Animalia
- Phylum: Cnidaria
- Class: Scyphozoa
- Order: Rhizostomeae
- Family: Mastigiidae
- Genus: Mastigias
- Species: M. andersoni

Binomial name
- Mastigias andersoni Stiasny, 1926

Species of jellyfish

Mastigias andersoni is a species of true jellyfish in the family Mastigiidae. It has been found in waters off the coast of Australia in Queensland and the Northern Territory. The body is up to 90 mm (3.5 in) wide and vaulted.

== Etymology ==
The specific name, andersoni, was given by Gustav Albert Stiasny in honor of the then-director of the Australian Museum in 1926, Charles Anderson.
