= Mastigietta =

Scientific classification
- Kingdom: Animalia
- Phylum: Cnidaria
- Class: Scyphozoa
- Order: Rhizostomeae
- Family: Mastigiidae
- Genus: Mastigietta; Stiasny, 1921
- Species: M. palmipes

Binomial name
- Mastigietta palmipes (Haeckel, 1880)

Synonyms
- Crambessa palmipes Haeckel, 1880

Genus of jellyfish

Mastigietta is a genus of true jellyfish in the family Mastigiidae. It is monotypic, only containing the species Mastigietta palmipes.
