= Lobonemoides =

- Lobonemoides robustus

Scientific classification
- Domain: Eukaryota
- Kingdom: Animalia
- Phylum: Cnidaria
- Class: Scyphozoa
- Order: Rhizostomeae
- Family: Lobonematidae
- Genus: Lobonemoides; Light, 1914

Genus of jellyfish

Lobonemoides is a genus of cnidarians belonging to the family Lobonematidae.

Species:

- Lobonemoides gracilis Light, 1914
- Lobonemoides robustus Stiasny, 1920
- Lobonemoides sewelli Rao, 1931
