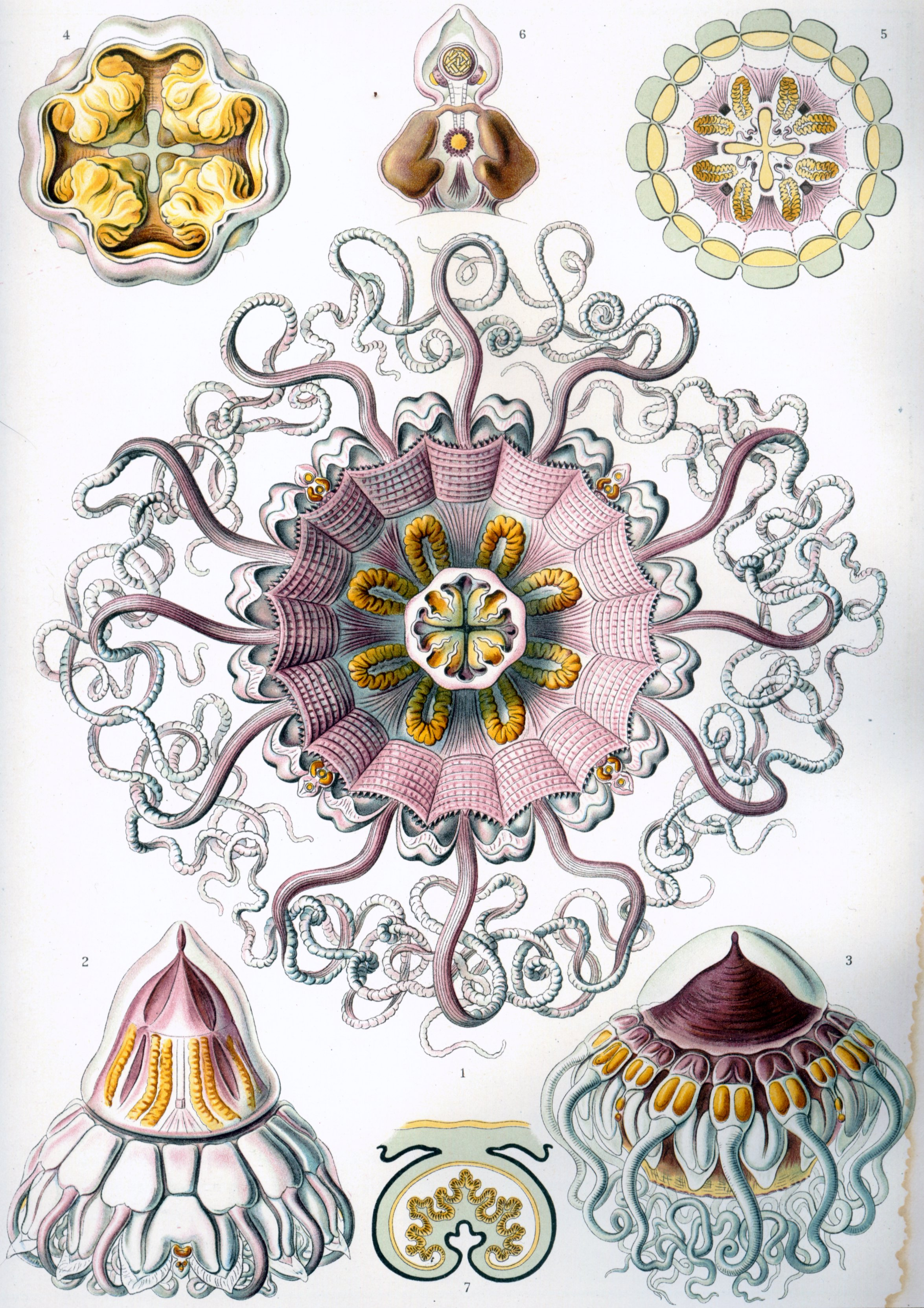
- Periphylla spp.

Scientific classification
- Kingdom: Animalia
- Phylum: Cnidaria
- Class: Scyphozoa
- Subclass: Coronamedusae; Calder, 2009

= Coronamedusae =

Subclass of jellyfishes

Coronamedusae is a subclass of jellyfish in the class Scyphozoa. It is the sister taxon of Discomedusae and contains about 50 named species, all included in the order Coronatae. Jellyfish in this subclass are either small medusae living in shallow marine environments, or large medusae living in the deep sea.

The mouthparts of the members of this subclass are characterised by simple lips on a short manubrium as well as by robust marginal tentacles that arc away from the mouth. It is likely that these marginal tentacles are used to capture plankton, including crustaceans and small fish in the larger species.

== Coronatae ==
Coronatae is the only order in this subclass, with around thirty-five species having been described, most of them deepwater jellyfish. The thimble jellyfish (Linuche unguiculata) is a tiny species, and one of the few from shallow tropical seas; It is a zooxanthellate species.

Coronatids have a characteristic constriction, the coronal groove, part way down the bell. Below this the bell is creased and lobed into four pedalia. Each pedalium bears a small non-retractable tentacle, and the margin of the bell bears either four or eight rhopalia (sensory organs) in the niches between flaps known as lappets. The coronal groove and the creases provide flexibility in the otherwise rather stiff bell. The short manubrium is four-sided and has a large mouth at its tip. The mouth opens into a central stomach which is divided into four pockets by septa, on which are located the gastric filaments and the eight gonads. Most coronatids search for prey with outstretched tentacles; when food items are found, they are subdued and pushed rather stiffly into the mouth by the tentacles.

== Taxonomy ==
According to the World Register of Marine Species, Coronamedusae contains the following taxa:

- Order Coronatae
  - Family Atollidae Bigelow, 1913
  - Family Atorellidae Vanhöffen, 1902
  - Family Coronatae incertae sedis
  - Family Linuchidae Haeckel, 1880
  - Family Nausithoidae (Claus, 1883)
  - Family Paraphyllinidae Maas, 1903
  - Family Periphyllidae Haeckel, 1880
