= Lobonema =

Scientific classification
- Kingdom: Animalia
- Phylum: Cnidaria
- Class: Scyphozoa
- Order: Rhizostomeae
- Family: Lobonematidae
- Genus: Lobonema; Mayer, 1910
- Species: L. smithii

Binomial name
- Lobonema smithii Mayer, 1910

Genus of jellyfish

Lobonema is a monotypic genus of cnidarians belonging to the family Lobonematidae. The only species is Lobonema smithii.

== Description ==
Lobonema smithii, commonly known as white jellyfish, is a species of jellyfish that often appears with a white or translucent color that spans across its whole body. It has a wide body, with its exumbrella being rough and rigid, which gives it a prominent umbrella shape. Additionally, the exumbrella is large, and notably gelatinous, which is one of this species most distinct characteristics.

The order which Lobonema smithii is categorized under, Rhizostomeae, has many defining features that Lobonema smithii carries. Some of these are thin, oral arms that become infused the closer they are to the centerpiece of the jellyfish. With Lobonema smithii, these arms are very thin and abundant, almost resembling hair-like properties.

=== Morphology and anatomy ===
23.6 cm wide, thick, tough, and rigid, and an erect exumbrella. This species has a notable gelatinous papillae, which is 3.5 to 4 cm long, pointed, nematocyst. This species has four velar lappets in each of its octants that are 9 to 10 cm long tapering, pointy and mouth arms which are 15 cm long. There are also distal three-winged portions that are one to one and a half as long as the proximal portion of the organism. Additionally, this species has long spindle appendages, with 16 radial canals attached to it.

== Distribution ==
The species is found in Malesia. Lobonema smithi is mostly contained in the Manila Bay region.

This organism has mainly only been spotted in the Indo-Pacific west.

The depth this organism tends to be found in is the Pelagic zone, and does not seem to venture far out of that region. Additionally, this species mainly stays in tropical waters.

== Notable traits ==
Lobonema smithii have only been found to be male or female, with males being the more prominently discovered and studied in abundance compared to females.

=== Life-cycle ===
This species follows the traditional Scyphozoan life cycle. Due to Lobonema smithii being gonochoric, The first step is an egg being laid by an adult in the medusa stage, which then is fertilized and becomes a planula. This larva undergoes processes such as metamorphoses which leads it to grow into a scyphistoma. This scyphistoma becomes a strobila, then finally becomes a young medusa.

=== Reproduction ===
Reproduction for this species has not been thoroughly studied or documented with how rarely spotted this species has become. It is possible that based on this species life cycle that the reproductive process is very similar to other jellyfish.

With this, the first step to jellyfish reproduction is the male releasing sperm from its mouth into the water it occupies. The females swim through this water and the sperm enters her oral cavity to reach unprotected eggs. This leads to these eggs become fertilized and develop into larvae, which begins the life cycle of this species.

=== Movement ===
Following Scyphozoan morphology, this organism swims through waters by contracting and relaxing the muscles found at the edge of the bell structure that makes up its central body.

=== Diet ===
The specific diet of this species has not been thoroughly studied. However, following the traditional Rhizostomaea diet, this species can feed on copepods, various fish larvae, and other small invertebrates

=== Use in industry ===
Lobonema smithii is most notably noted for its gelatin production, as the main feature of this jellyfish is that it is edible. The lobonema is an integral part to the Thai fishery export due to this jellyfish being edible. Its characteristic high collagenous protein has made itself subject to multiple studies as a potential source of gelatin. Lobonema's high nutritional value and pharmacological capabilities make it a popular treatment for health issues in China.
