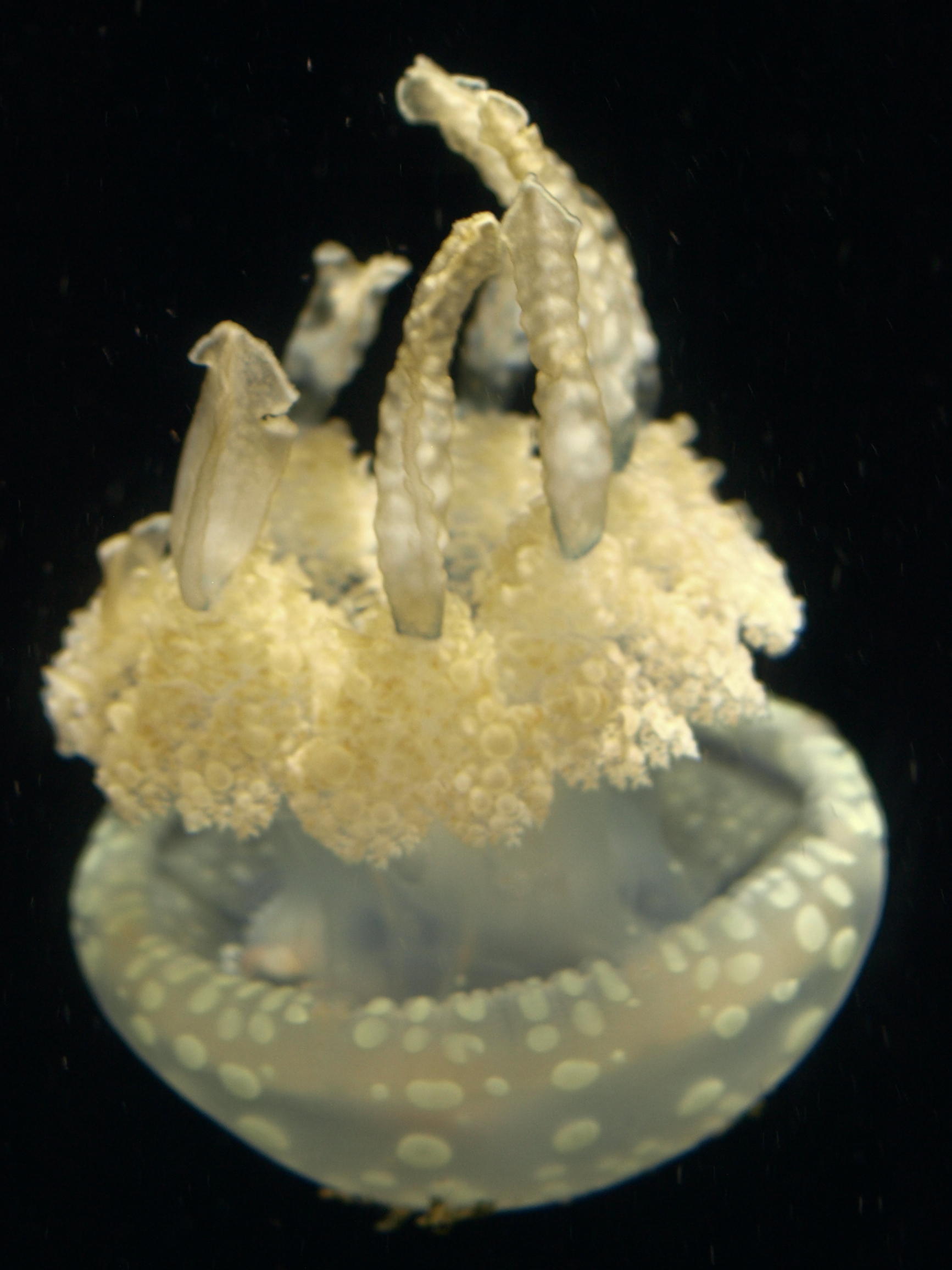
- Mastigias papua

Scientific classification
- Kingdom: Animalia
- Phylum: Cnidaria
- Class: Scyphozoa
- Order: Rhizostomeae
- Family: Mastigiidae
- Genus: Mastigias; Agassiz, 1862

Species
- 8 species, see text

= Mastigias =

Genus of jellyfishes

Mastigias is a genus of true jellyfish in the family Mastigiidae. It contains eight recognized species. Members of this genus are found widely in coastal regions of the Indo-Pacific, including saline lakes of Palau (e.g., Jellyfish Lake), but there are also records from the West Atlantic at Florida and Puerto Rico. The West Atlantic records are most likely the result of accidental introductions by humans.

== Species ==
According to the World Register of Marine Species, this genus includes eight recognized species:

- Mastigias albipunctata Stiasny, 1920
- Mastigias andersoni Stiasny, 1926
- Mastigias gracilis (Vanhöffen, 1888)
- Mastigias ocellatus (Modeer, 1791) – golden medusa
- Mastigias pantherina Haeckel, 1880
- Mastigias papua (Lesson, 1830) – spotted jelly
- Mastigias roseus (Reynaud, 1830)
- Mastigias sidereus Chun, 1896

== Synapomorphies ==
For reproduction, Mastigias papua has adopted a mono-mode reproductive strategy that develops only free-swimming buds. Mastigias organisms also are able to produce swimming frustules, a hard and porous cell wall covering diatoms.

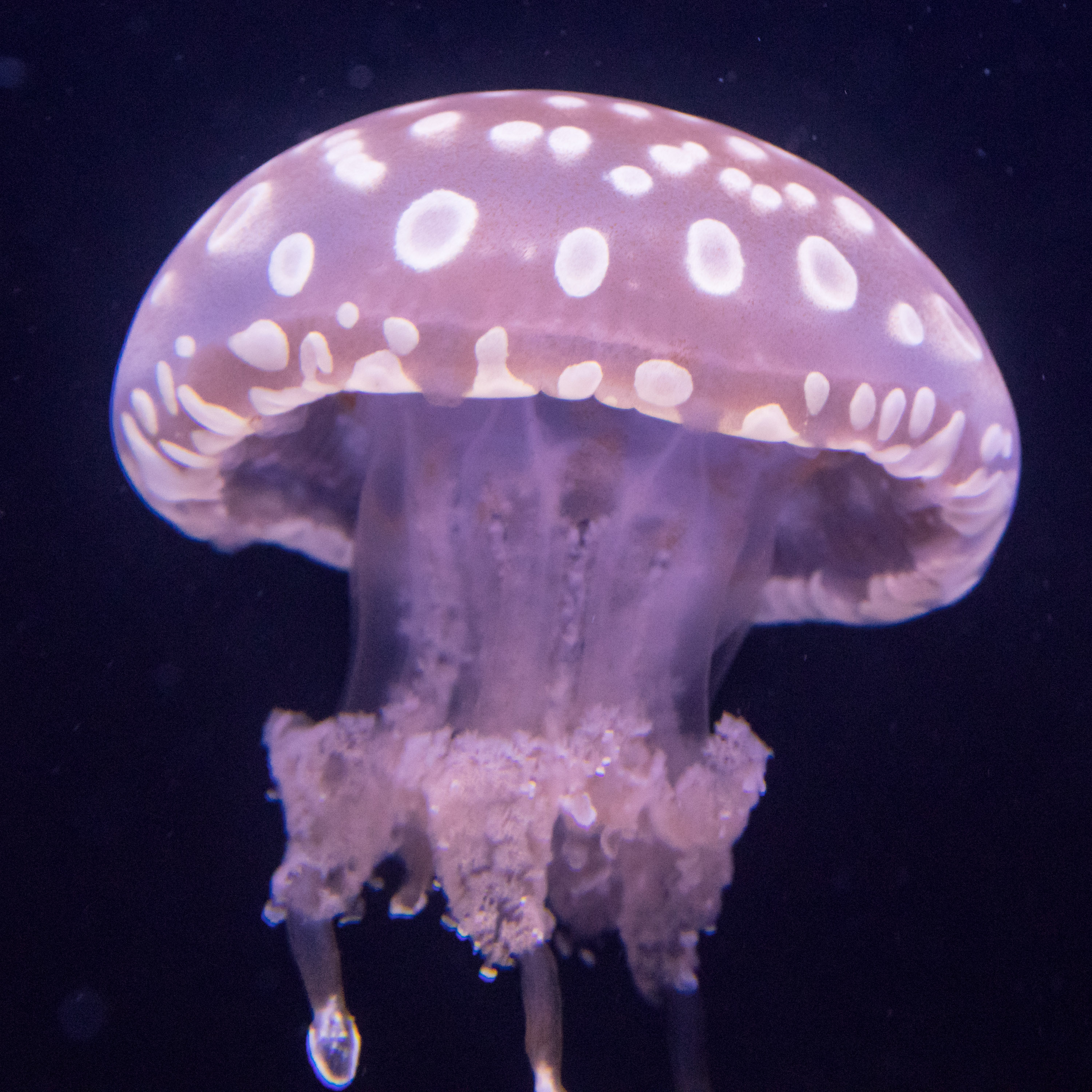
Mastigias papua

== Habitat ==
The genus Mastigias is native to the western and central Indo-Pacific, from Australia to Japan, and Micronesia to the Indian Ocean. However, most Mastigias organisms choose to live in landlocked marine lakes. Behavioral differences among this genus do occur with varying habitats. Marine lake Mastigias swim slower than their oceanic ancestors. The Mastigias genus may have to adapt to a habitat with warmer temperatures. With growing temperature deviation above the average, organisms within this genus have seen a decrease in population abundance as well as growing mortality rates.

== Interactions ==
Mastigias jellyfish have a symbiotic relationship with zooxanthellae living in host gastrodermal cells where they exhibit phased division. Mastigias papua symbiotically produce ephyrae only in the presence of Symbiodinium, in a process called strobilation.
