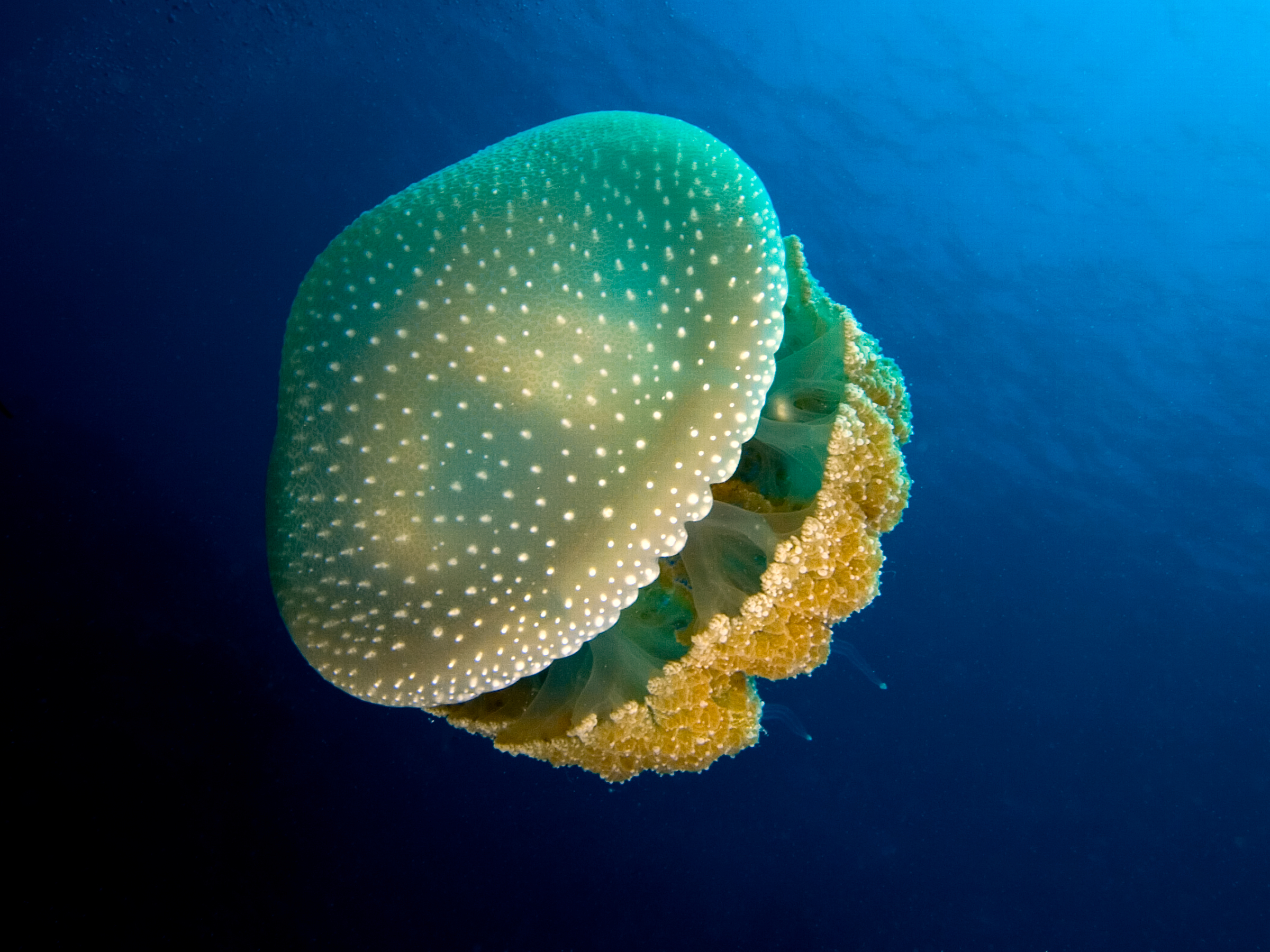
- Phyllorhiza punctata

Scientific classification
- Kingdom: Animalia
- Phylum: Cnidaria
- Class: Scyphozoa
- Order: Rhizostomeae
- Family: Mastigiidae
- Genus: Phyllorhiza; Agassiz, 1862

= Phyllorhiza =

Genus of jellyfishes

Phyllorhiza is a genus of jellyfish in the family Mastigiidae.

== Species ==
The following species are recognized in the genus Phyllorhiza:

- Phyllorhiza pacifica (Light, 1921)
- Phyllorhiza peronlesueuri Goy, 1990
- Phyllorhiza punctata Lendenfeld, 1884
