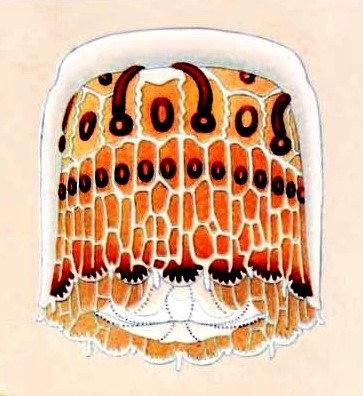

Scientific classification
- Domain: Eukaryota
- Kingdom: Animalia
- Phylum: Cnidaria
- Class: Scyphozoa
- Order: Coronatae
- Family: Linuchidae
- Genus: Linuche
- Species: L. aquila

Binomial name
- Linuche aquila (Haeckel, 1880)

= Linuche aquila =

Species of jellyfish

Linuche aquila is a species of cnidarian found in the tropical and subtropical areas of the Pacific Ocean. It is very small and is commonly known as a thimble jellyfish because of its size and shape. The larvae can cause bathers to develop an itchy red rash commonly known as seabather's eruption.

== Description ==
The Linuche aquila is a very small jellyfish with a flat-topped bell separated from the vertical sides by a coronal groove. It can grow to a diameter of 16 mm (0.63 in) and a height of 13 mm (0.51 in). There are sixteen bluntly oval marginal lappets (flaps) and eight rhopalia (sensory organs) between them. Underneath the bell is a manubrium with a central mouth and four undivided lips. This leads to a four-chambered stomach which opens through four openings into a ring sinus which has sixteen branching pouches extending into the lappets. Eight gonads are present, arranged in four crescent-shaped pairs. This species of jellyfish has symbiotic zooxanthellae in its tissues which supply a major part of its energy requirements.

== Ecology ==
Some authorities consider Linuche aquila to be a synonym of Linuche unguiculata, a species that occurs in the eastern Atlantic Ocean, the Caribbean Sea and the Gulf of Mexico. Both become very numerous at some times of year, forming vast swarms. In the case of Linuche aquila, these can be found anywhere between Malaysia and the east coast of Africa. The larvae of both species are known as sea lice, and are causative agents for a condition known as seabather's eruption. They cause itchy red rashes with raised pustules in areas where the larvae get trapped under swimwear and discharge their stinging cells into the skin. Cases caused by Linuche aquila have been reported from Thailand and the Philippines. Most cases occur between the months of March and August, peaking during May and June.
