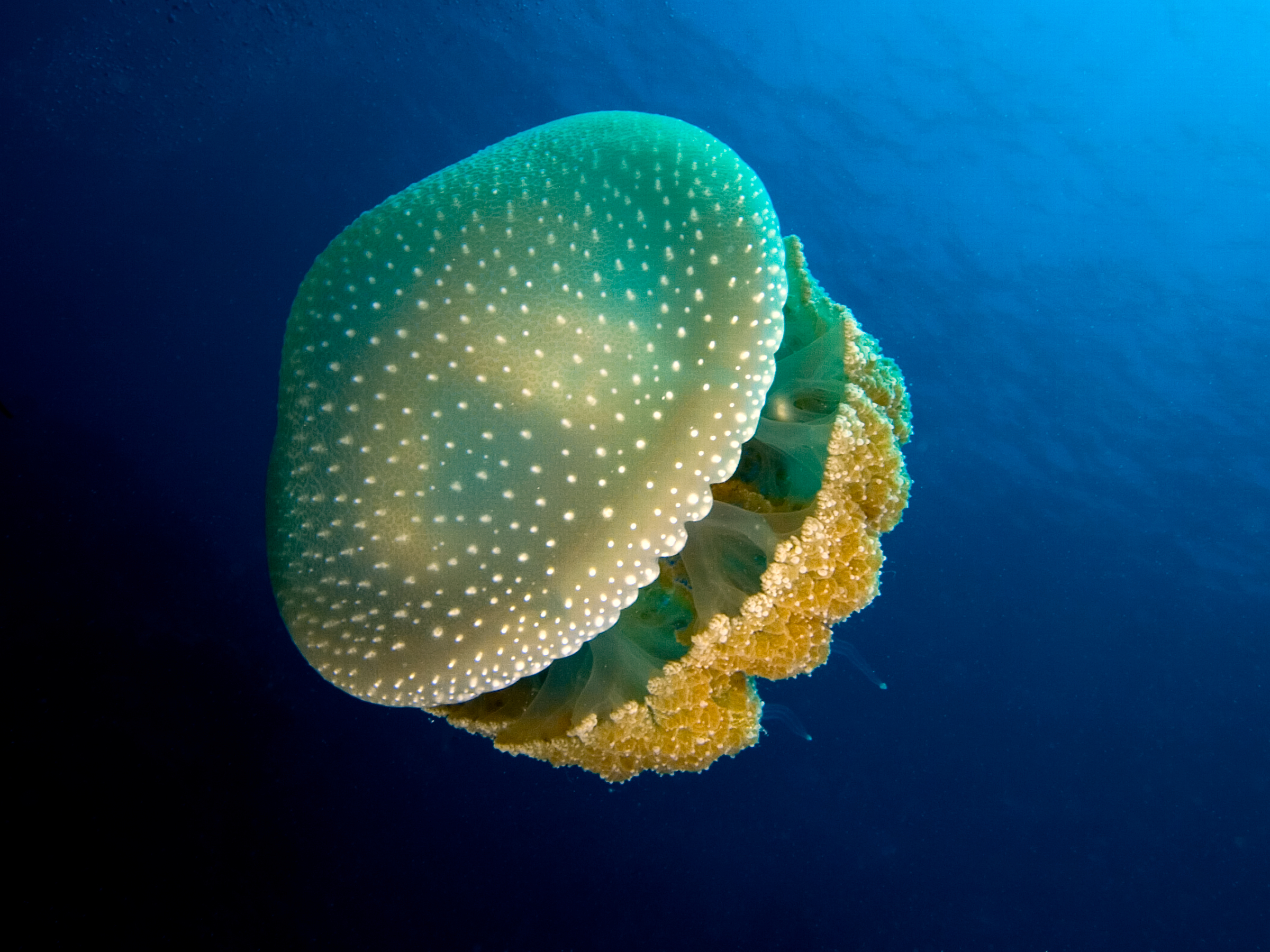
- Phyllorhiza punctata off the north coast of Haiti

Scientific classification
- Kingdom: Animalia
- Phylum: Cnidaria
- Class: Scyphozoa
- Order: Rhizostomeae
- Family: Mastigiidae
- Genus: Phyllorhiza
- Species: P. punctata

Binomial name
- Phyllorhiza punctata Lendenfeld, 1884

= Phyllorhiza punctata =

Species of jellyfish

Phyllorhiza punctata is a species of jellyfish, also known as the floating bell, Australian spotted jellyfish, brown jellyfish or the white-spotted jellyfish. It is native to the western Pacific from Australia to Japan, but has been introduced widely elsewhere. It feeds primarily on zooplankton. P. punctata generally can reach up to 50 centimetres (20 in) in bell diameter, but in October 2007, one 74 cm (29 in) wide, perhaps the largest ever recorded, was found on Sunset Beach, North Carolina.

== Description ==
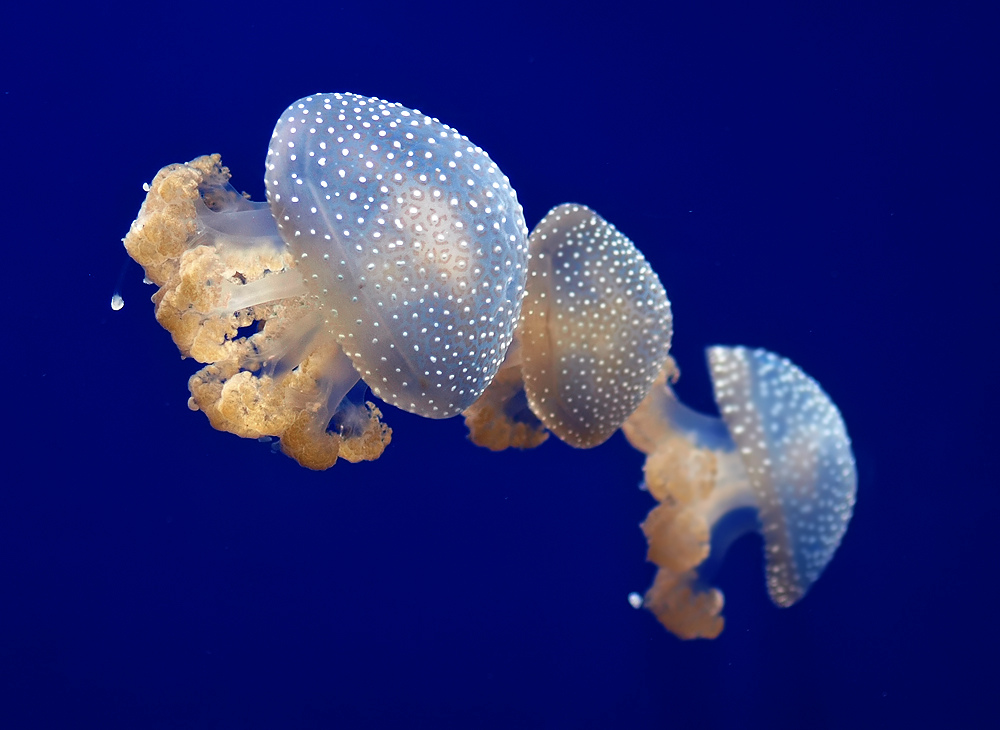
At Tierpark Hagenbeck, Germany

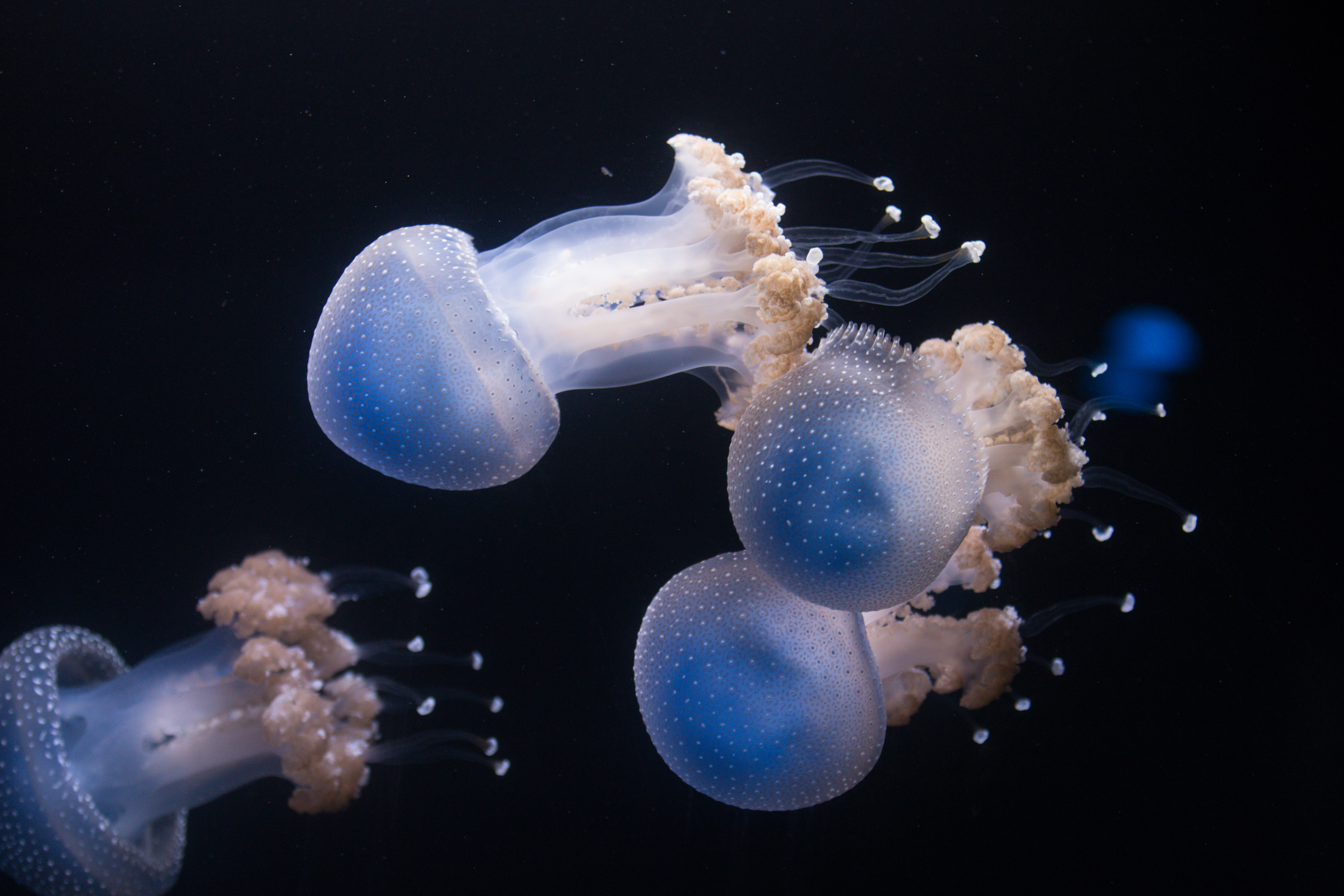
At Tiergarten Schönbrunn, Hietzing, Wien, Austria

True jellyfish go through a two-stage life cycle which consists of a medusa stage (adult) and a polyp stage (juvenile). In the medusa stage, male jellyfish release sperm into the water column and the female jellyfish gathers the sperm into her mouth where she holds the eggs. Once fertilization occurs and larvae are formed they leave their mother and settle to the ocean floor. Once on the bottom a polyp form occurs and this form reproduces asexually by "cloning" or dividing itself into other polyps. Jellyfish can live for up to five years in the polyp stage and up to two years in the medusa stage (active).

When found in warm waters, these jellyfish flourish. They are mostly euryhaline but low salinities may have a negative effect on the species. In times of low salinity, these jellyfish exhibit loss of their zooxanthellae. Their dispersal patterns are locally patchy.

They have only a mild venom and are not considered a threat to humans. They have a mild or non-noticeable sting which can be cured with dilute acid. (Usually white or cider vinegar)

== Ecology ==
The Phyllorhiza punctata is a part of the Rhizostomatidae family and the genus Phyllorhiza.

Their venom is not potent enough to kill their prey which is why they are filter feeders. Their main food source is zooplankton. Normally they travel in large groups, which tends to result in huge swaths of them consuming all of the zooplankton in the area. This leads to detrimental impacts for the local ecosystem in which they travel through. Since they eat all the zooplankton, there is a lack of food for the other species relying on the plankton as their food source.

Their native distribution is around Cairns, Queensland, Australia, and Thailand. Having its native habitat extend north from eastern Australia up to South East Asia. They have also been found in non-native regions such as Western Australia, United States, the Atlantic Basin, Brazil, Puerto Rico, the eastern Mediterranean, New Zealand, Caribbean, and the Gulf of Mexico. The P. punctata prefer warm temperate seas and aggregate in waters near coastlines.

Their nutrition comes primarily from zooplankton. The process of consumption is by filtration. Fluid flows over clusters of mouthlets near the base of the oral arm disk in the centre of the cylinder. The feeding process is continuous since the jellyfish must be swimming in order to move the prey to different mouthlets so they can be digested.

Reproduction in P. punctata is unique. In the initial stage of life – the polyp stage – the polyp is asexual. It reproduces by multiplying itself various times; creating a larger hatch than the original the mother had created. The next stage – the medusa stage – is when the jellyfish becomes sexually reproductive. The male shoots his sperm into the water and the female collects the sperm in her mouthlets and filter them to her reproductive organs. There they grow into polyps where they are eventually dropped to the bottom of the ocean where they grow and begin to reproduce on their own.

== Invasive species ==
Video from Universeum, Sweden

The species has been found in the waters off the Hawaiian Islands since at least 1945, in the Mediterranean Sea since at least 1965, and in large numbers in the Gulf of Mexico since 2000. In the eastern Pacific, it has been sighted in the San Diego area and the Gulf of California as early as 1981. While it is not known how it was introduced to these regions, it has been theorized that budding polyps may have attached themselves to ships, or were carried in a ship's ballast tank which was subsequently dumped. As an invasive species, it has become a threat to several species of shrimp. In Gulf waters, the medusae grow to unusually large size, upwards of 60 cm (24 in) across.

In July 2007, smallish individuals were seen in Bogue Sound much further north along the North Carolina coast. However, their ability to consume plankton and the eggs and larvae of important fish species is cause for concern. Each jellyfish can filter as much as 50,000 litres (13,000 US gal) of seawater per day. While doing that, it ingests the plankton that native species need.

In North America and Hawaii, its non-native locations are the following: Northern Gulf of Mexico, Southern California, Greater Antilles, Florida, and the Hawaiian Islands. They are also threatening large fishing industries because of their consumption of eggs and the larvae of fish, crab and shrimp. Along with harming populations in the fisheries, they severely clog the fishnets, damage boat intakes, and ruin fishing gear. At times they cause the closure of productive areas for fishing.
