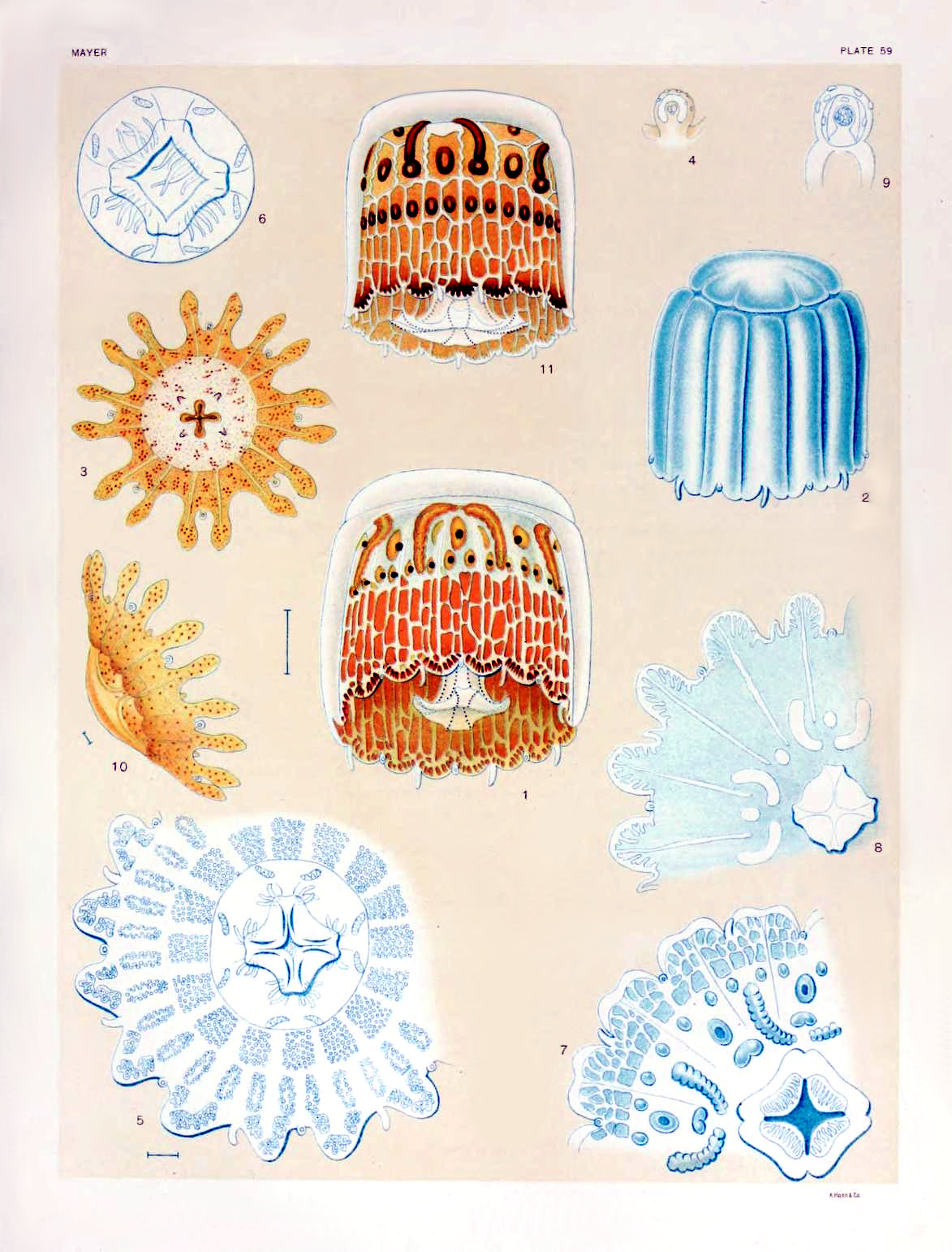
- 1-10. Linuche unguiculata 11. Linuche aquila (top centre)

Scientific classification
- Kingdom: Animalia
- Phylum: Cnidaria
- Class: Scyphozoa
- Order: Coronatae
- Family: Linuchidae
- Genus: Linuche
- Species: L. unguiculata

Binomial name
- Linuche unguiculata (Schwartz, 1788)

Synonyms
- Linuche draco (Haeckel, 1880)

= Thimble jellyfish =

Species of cnidarian

The thimble jellyfish (Linuche unguiculata) is a species of cnidarian found in the warm West Atlantic Ocean, including the Caribbean. It is a tiny jellyfish with a straight-sided, flat-topped bell. This jellyfish is the most common cause of seabather's eruption, a reaction caused by the injection of juvenile jellyfish nematocysts into human skin.

== Description ==
The medusa of the thimble jellyfish has straight sides with sixteen grooves, and a flat top. The coronal groove between the top and sides provides flexibility. The margin of the bell has sixteen lappets (folds), the niches between these bearing alternately rhopalia (sense organs) and short tentacles (eight of each). There is no marginal ring canal. Symbiotic zooxanthellae give the bell an overall orangish-brown colour and the translucent mesoglea has dark flecks. This jellyfish can reach a diameter of 16 mm (0.6 in) and a height of 20 mm (0.8 in).

=== Distribution and habitat ===
The thimble jellyfish is found in the tropical and subtropical western Atlantic Ocean, particularly around the West Indies and the Bahamas. Although it can occur in warm surface waters, it has been found at depths down to about 5,000 m (16,000 ft). Its presence in any particular location is related to such factors as the presence of prey, temperature, salinity and oxygen saturation of the water.

=== Ecology ===
The thimble jellyfish swims constantly by pulsating its bell, rotating as it moves. It forms swarms in warm seas near the surface of the water. Aggregations have been reported covering a million square metres 1,000,000 m^{2} (1,200,000 yd^{2}). The jellyfish feeds on plankton, drawing a water current past its outstretched tentacles by pulsating the bell. When edible zooplankton are encountered, they are immobilised by the cnidocytes (stinging cells) and passed by the tentacles to the mouth on the underside of the bell. Thimble jellyfish are consumed by spadefish, sunfish, green sea turtles and other predators (such as sea slugs).

== Seabather's eruption ==
Larvae of the thimble jellyfish are the most common cause of seabather's eruption in the Caribbean and the Gulf of Mexico. The condition occurs when a swimmer comes in contact with a cloud of larvae, which stick to the swimmer's clothing and hair. When the swimmer exits the water and either bathes or drys out, the larvae are killed and in the process discharge their under-developed stinging cells. The stings are not painful, but can cause an itchy rash to form. In Florida, most cases occur between March and August. A similar condition occurs on the west coast of North America after exposure to the larvae of the sea anemone Edwardsiella lineata.
