= Thysanostoma loriferum =

Scientific classification
- Kingdom: Animalia
- Phylum: Cnidaria
- Class: Scyphozoa
- Order: Rhizostomeae
- Family: Thysanostomatidae
- Genus: Thysanostoma
- Species: T. loriferum

Binomial name
- Thysanostoma loriferum (Ehrenberg, 1837)

Species of jellyfish

Thysanostoma loriferum is a species of true jellyfish from the Indo-Pacific. The first sighting of Thysanostoma loriferum in Hong Kong waters, extending its known range from the Philippines, the Malay Archipelago, and Hawaii, was from the Hong Kong Jellyfish Citizen Science project via sightings on iNaturalist.
