= Linantha =

Scientific classification
- Kingdom: Animalia
- Phylum: Cnidaria
- Class: Scyphozoa
- Order: Coronatae
- Family: Linuchidae
- Genus: Linantha; Haeckel, 1880
- Species: L. lunulata

Binomial name
- Linantha lunulata Haeckel, 1880

Genus of jellyfishes

Linantha is a genus of crown jellyfish in the family Linuchidae. It is a monotypic genus and the only species is Linantha lunulata which was first described by the German biologist Ernst Haeckel in 1880. It is found in the tropical eastern Pacific Ocean in the vicinity of the Galápagos Islands.

== Description ==
The medusae of Linantha lunulata can be distinguished from other crown jellyfish medusae by having four inter-radial gonads shaped like horseshoes, and no subumbrella.
