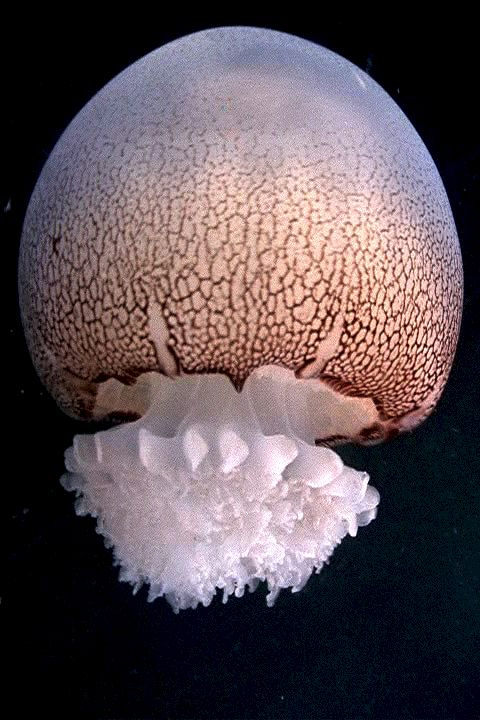

Scientific classification
- Kingdom: Animalia
- Phylum: Cnidaria
- Class: Scyphozoa
- Order: Rhizostomeae
- Family: Stomolophidae
- Genus: Stomolophus
- Species: S. meleagris

Binomial name
- Stomolophus meleagris (Agassiz, 1860)

= Cannonball jellyfish =

Species of jellyfish

The cannonball jellyfish (Stomolophus meleagris), also known as the cabbagehead jellyfish, is a species of jellyfish in the family Stomolophidae. Its common name derives from its similarity to a cannonball in shape and size. Its scientific name means “many mouthed hunter”. Its dome-shaped bell can reach 25 cm (10 in) in diameter. The rim is often colored with brown pigment. There are several known undescribed Stomolophus species found in the Pacific and South Atlantic that exhibit pale to blue pigment. They are genetically different from the individuals found in the North Atlantic - but are commonly misidentified as such. Underneath the body is a cluster of oral arms that extend out around the mouth. These arms function in propulsion and as an aid in catching prey. Cannonballs are prominent from North America's eastern seaboard to the Gulf of Mexico.

== Habitat ==
They are common on the southeastern coast of the United States, including the Gulf Coast. They have also been found throughout the Atlantic Ocean from New England to Brazil and in the Pacific Ocean from California to Ecuador and from the Sea of Japan to the South China Sea. On the southeast coast they are extremely abundant in the fall and summer months. During these months, cannonballs make up over 16% of the biomass in the shallow inshore areas.

== Diet ==
Cannonballs eat mainly zooplankton such as veligers, and also all forms of red drum larvae. Several species of Brachyura crustaceans have a communalistic relationship with scyphomedusae. Among cannonball jellyfish, they primarily have a relationship with juvenile portly spider crab usually until they reach sizes of 15-20 mm. However, adult crabs have been witnessed to live in the bell. The spiders often eat the food the cannonball catches and its tissue, but its regenerative abilities mean it does not negatively impact the cannonball. Most cannonballs have just one spider crab in their bells, but a cannonball has been witnessed with up to ten.

== Reproduction ==
As in most cnidarians sexual reproduction is not an imperative way for cannonballs to reproduce. They can reproduce both sexually and asexually.

During sexual reproduction, cannonballs shoot sperm out of their mouth. The sperm are then caught by another cannonball through the mouth and fertilization happens. The embryo begins to develop in specialized pouches found on the arms around the mouth. After about 3–5 hours the larvae fall to the bottom and attach themselves to a hard structure. There they develop into polyps and catch small prey that swims by. After several days the polyp will detach and become a swimming ephyra, and will eventually turn into an adult jellyfish.

== Toxin ==
When disrupted, the cannonball secretes a mucus out of its nematocyst that contains a toxin. The toxin harms small fish in the immediate area, and drives away most predators, except for certain types of crabs. Although cannonballs do not commonly sting humans, they do have toxins which can, but not usually, cause cardiac problems in animals and humans. The toxin can cause irregular heart rhythms and problems in the myocardial conduction pathways. Such complications are associated also with toxins of other cnidaria. The toxin is also harmful to the eyes; contact with a nematocyst can be very painful, followed by redness and swelling. However, cannonball jellyfish are mostly harmless to humans. Contact with them may cause the skin to itch slightly, or minor eye irritation. As such they are among the most common causes of minor stings to humans in US and Caribbean waters.

== Predators ==
One of the main predators of cannonball jellyfish is the endangered species leatherback sea turtle. Cannonball jellyfish are also commercially harvested as food for humans.

== Commercial fishing ==
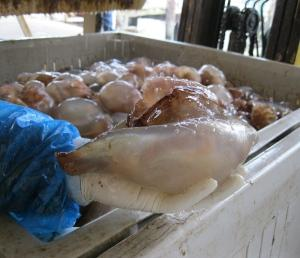
Cannonball jellyfish (or "Georgia jellyballs" as they are known locally) are dried, preserved and packaged before being sold to a seafood distributor that ships them to Japan, China and Thailand.

Along the coast of the southern U.S. state of Georgia, jellyfish are a valuable export, which end up on dining tables across Asia. The jellyfish are dried, preserved and packaged before being sold to a seafood distributor that ships them to Japan, China, and Thailand.

Jellyball (as they are known locally) fishing is Georgia’s third largest commercial fishery. In Georgia, fishermen target jellyfish with modified trawl nets, and studies have shown low quantities of bycatch are typically seen in the fishery.

As of August 2025, Mexican coasts have experienced an increase in the abundance and frequency in blooms of this jellyfish. In 2012 El Golfo de Santa Clara harvested 20,000 tons (~$3.5 million USD) from late April to early July, which elevated the importance of this resource in the region. However, further studies need to be done in order to increase the predictability and improve the management strategies.

== See also ==
- Jellyfish as food
- List of delicacies
- List of dried foods
- List of types of seafood
