= Linuche =

Scientific classification
- Domain: Eukaryota
- Kingdom: Animalia
- Phylum: Cnidaria
- Class: Scyphozoa
- Order: Coronatae
- Family: Linuchidae
- Genus: Linuche; Eschscholtz, 1829

Genus of jellyfishes

Linuche is a genus of cnidarians belonging to the family Linuchidae.

The species of this genus are found in America and Southeastern Asia.

Species:

- Linuche aquila (Haeckel, 1880)
- Linuche lamarckii Haeckel, 1880
- Linuche unguiculata (Schwartz, 1788)
- Linuche vesiculata Haeckel, 1880
- Linuche draco Haeckel, 1880
