= Seabather's eruption =

Itchy skin due to stings from the larvae of various cnidarians

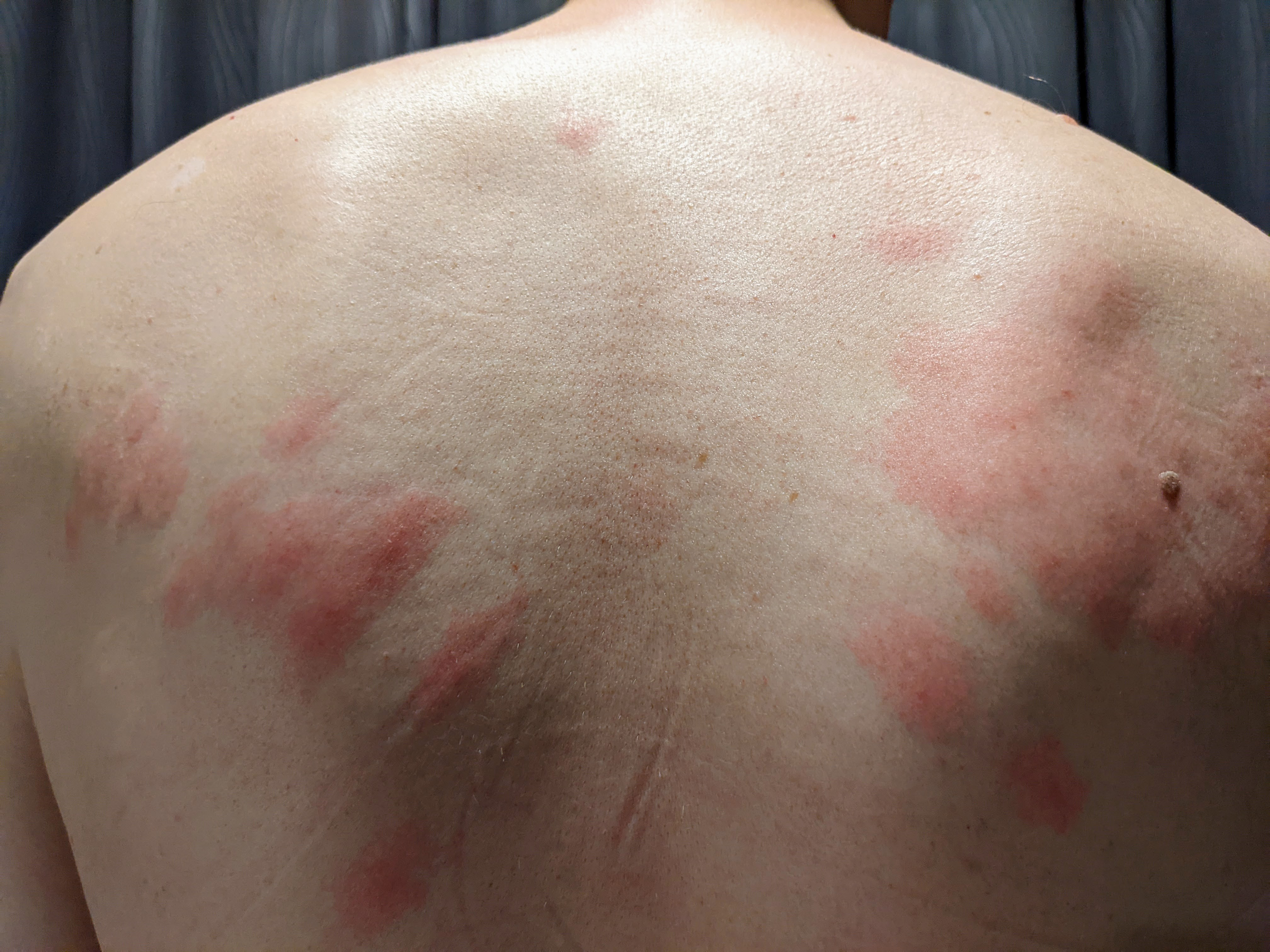
Seabather's eruption

Seabather's eruption is an itching dermatitis caused by a hypersensitivity reaction to the immature nematocysts of larval-stage thimble jellyfish (Linuche unguiculata), sea anemones (Edwardsiella lineata) and other larval cnidarians. The eruption is sometimes attributed to "sea lice" or "sea ants", but sea lice (Caligidae) are crustacean parasites of fish only.

It should not be confused with swimmer's itch.

== Symptoms and signs ==
Symptoms generally arise later after showering. It is unusual to notice the eruptions immediately. Symptoms can last from a few days up to, exceptionally, two weeks.

The reaction is identified by severe itching around small red papules 1mm to 1.5 cm in size on areas of skin that were covered by water-permeable clothing or hair during ocean swimming. Initial swimmer exposure to the free-floating larvae produces no effects, as each organism possesses only a single undeveloped nematocyst which is inactive while suspended in seawater. However, due to their microscopic size and sticky bodies, large concentrations of larvae can become trapped in minute gaps between skin and clothing or hair. Once the swimmer leaves the ocean, the organisms stuck against the skin die, and automatically discharge their nematocysts when crushed, dried out, or exposed to freshwater. This is why symptoms usually do not appear until the swimmer dries, or takes a freshwater shower, without removing the affected clothing.

== Treatment ==
Treatment is symptomatic, with most affected using a topical anti-itch cream (diphenhydramine) and a cortisone solution (hydrocortisone).

== Incidence ==
Seabather's eruption is common throughout the range of Linuche unguiculata in the Caribbean, Florida, Mexico, and Gulf States. Cases were first identified in Brazil in 2001. The closely related Linuche aquila, found anywhere between Malaysia, the Philippines and the east coast of Africa, is also known to cause the condition.

Swimmers in Queensland, Australia, have reported seabather's eruption during the summer months of the year. Swimmers at the east-coast beaches of Auckland and the rest of the Hauraki Gulf in New Zealand can develop seabather's eruption, typically during summer.
