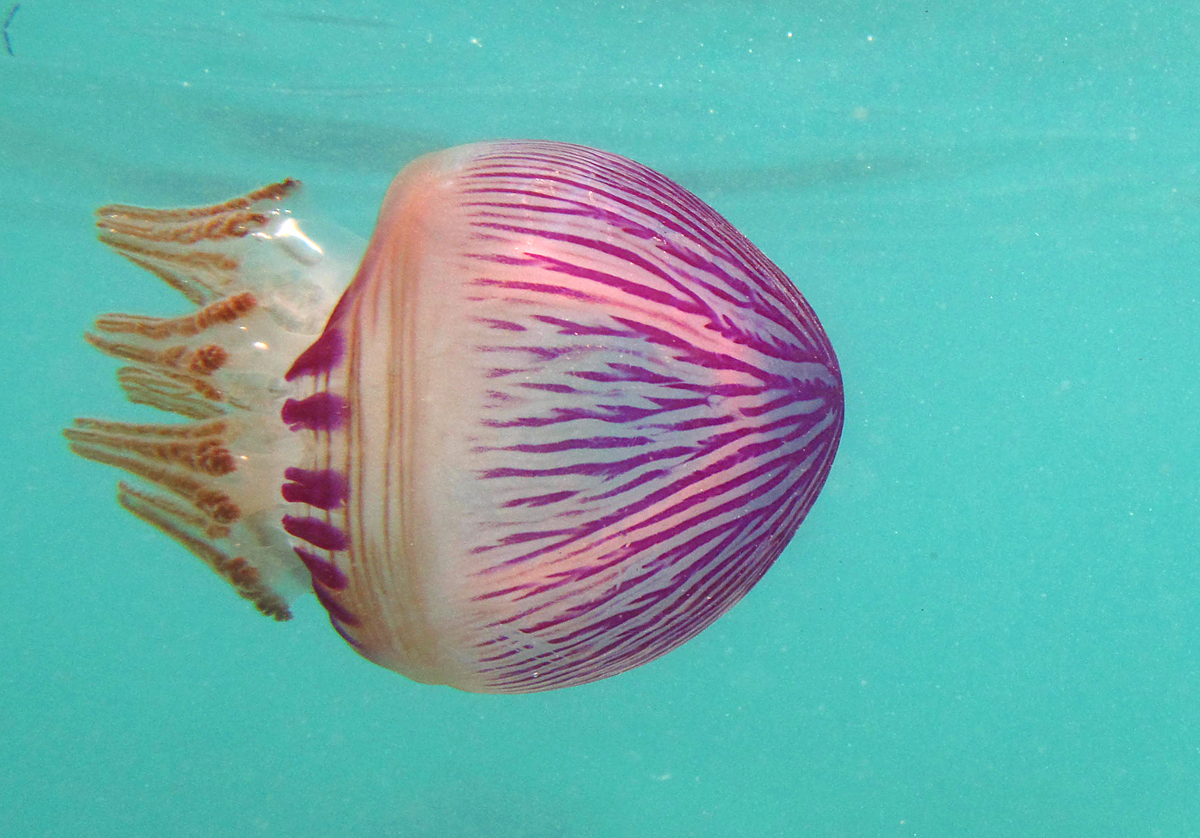
- Thysanostoma loriferum

Scientific classification
- Kingdom: Animalia
- Phylum: Cnidaria
- Class: Scyphozoa
- Order: Rhizostomeae
- Family: Thysanostomatidae; Gegenbaur, 1857
- Genus: Thysanostoma; Agassiz, 1862

= Thysanostoma =

Genus of jellyfishes

Thysanostomatidae is a family of true jellyfish from the Indo-Pacific. The first sighting of Thysanostoma loriferum in Hong Kong; extending its known range from the Philippines, the Malay Archipelago, and Hawaii; was from the Hong Kong Jellyfish Citizen Science project and sightings on iNaturalist.

== Species ==
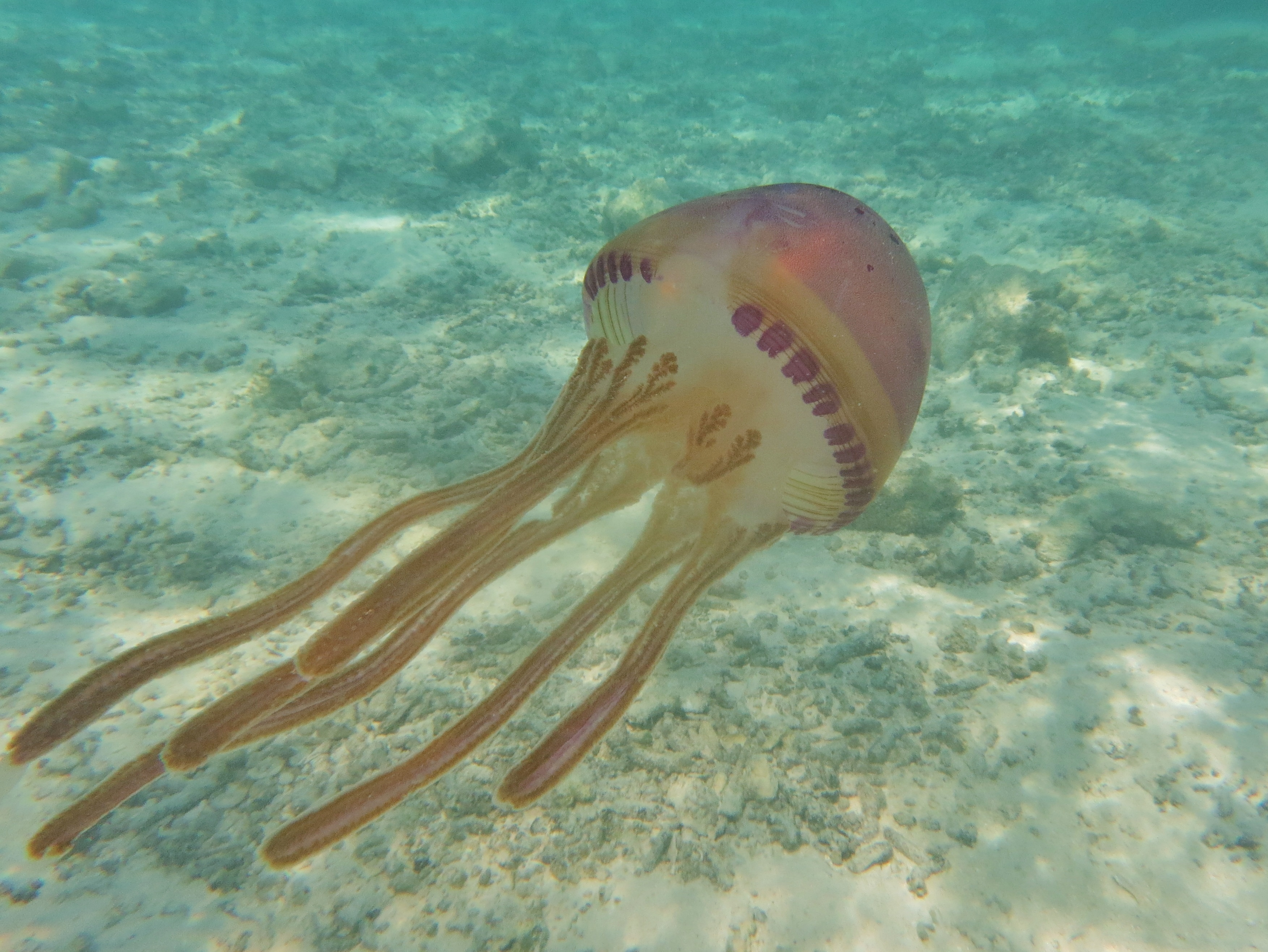
Thysanostoma loriferum

According to the World Register of Marine Species, this family includes one genus, Thysanostoma, with three species:

- Thysanostoma flagellatum (Haeckel, 1880)
- Thysanostoma loriferum (Ehrenberg, 1837)
- Thysanostoma thysanura Haeckel, 1880
