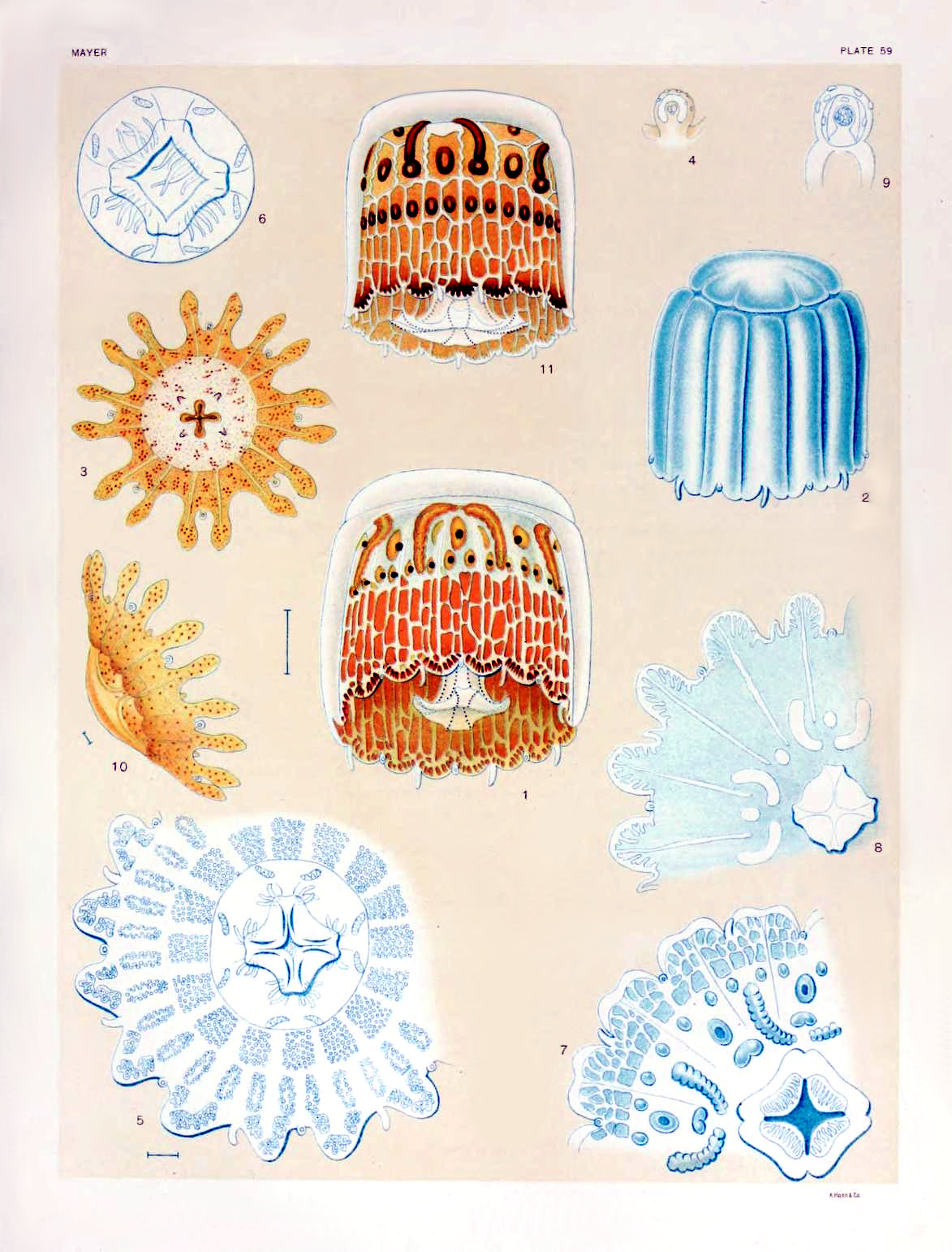
- 1-10. Linuche unguiculata 11. Linuche aquila (top centre)

Scientific classification
- Kingdom: Animalia
- Phylum: Cnidaria
- Class: Scyphozoa
- Order: Coronatae
- Family: Linuchidae; Haeckel, 1879

Genera
- Linantha Haeckel, 1880; Linerges Haeckel, 1880; Linuche Eschscholtz, 1829

= Linuchidae =

Family of jellyfishes

Linuchidae is a family of crown jellyfish.

== Species ==
- Linantha
  - Linantha lunulata
- Linuche
  - Linuche aquila
  - Thimble jellyfish (Linuche unguiculata)
  - Linuche draco

The family additionally contains the accepted genus Linerges, according to the World Register of Marine Species, but no species are within it, all having been synonymized with species in Linuche. Additionally, the unassessed genus Liniscus is part of the family.
