= Lobonematidae =

Scientific classification
- Kingdom: Animalia
- Phylum: Cnidaria
- Class: Scyphozoa
- Order: Rhizostomeae
- Family: Lobonematidae

Family of cnidarians

Lobonematidae is a family of jellyfishes belonging to the order Rhizostomeae.

Genera:

- Lobonema Mayer, 1910
- Lobonemoides Light, 1914
