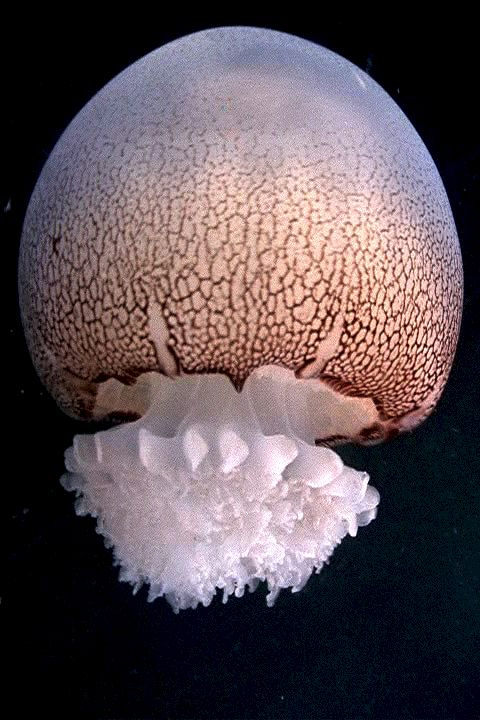
- Stomolophus meleagris

Scientific classification
- Domain: Eukaryota
- Kingdom: Animalia
- Phylum: Cnidaria
- Class: Scyphozoa
- Order: Rhizostomeae
- Suborder: Dactyliophorae
- Family: Stomolophidae; Haeckel, 1880
- Genus: Stomolophus; L. Agassiz, 1862

Species
- 2 species, see text

= Stomolophus =

Genus of jellyfishes

Stomolophus is a genus of true jellyfish from the West Atlantic and Pacific. It is the only genus in the monotypic family Stomolophidae. Formerly, Nomura's jellyfish (Nemopilema nomurai) was also included in this genus, but has now been reclassified to the family Rhizostomatidae.

== Species ==
According to the World Register of Marine Species, Stomolophus includes two species:

- Stomolophus fritillarius
- Stomolophus meleagris – the cannonball or cabbagehead jellyfish
