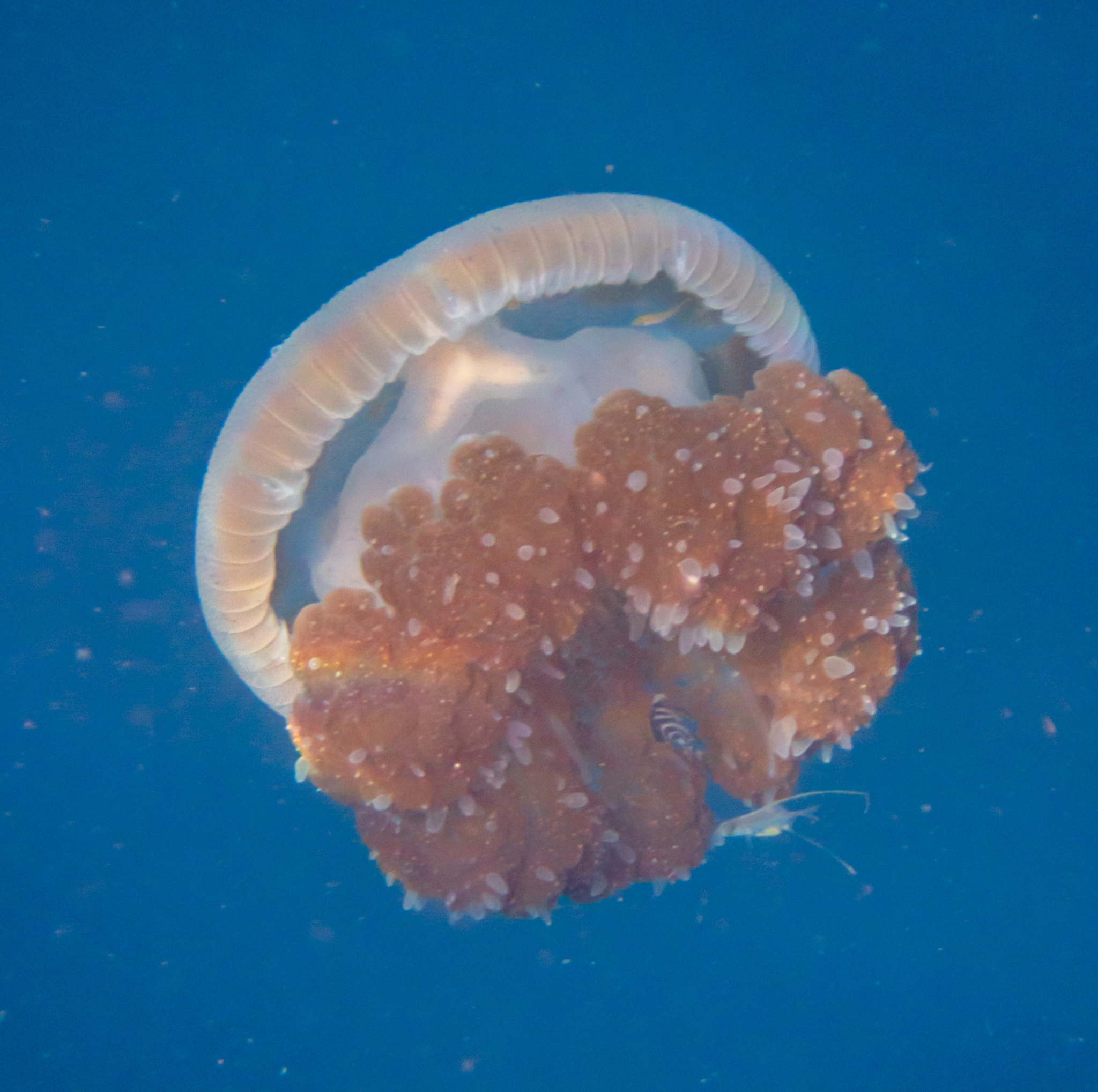
- V. anadyomene from Koh Tao, Thailand

Scientific classification
- Kingdom: Animalia
- Phylum: Cnidaria
- Class: Scyphozoa
- Order: Rhizostomeae
- Family: Versurigidae
- Genus: Versuriga; Kramp, 1961
- Species: V. anadyomene

Binomial name
- Versuriga anadyomene (Maas, 1903)

= Versuriga =

Genus of cnidarians

Versuriga is a monotypic genus of jellyfishes belonging to the monotypic family Versurigidae. The only species is Versuriga anadyomene. This species is rare, only having been sighted in a limited region. However, it can be identified by its gradient-like coloration, as well as its umbrella shaped bell, which is common amongst other members of the class Scyphozoa. This species is important for many reasons, ranging from ecological interactions to socioeconomic benefits. Notably, Versuriga is able to form commensalistic relationships with other organisms, impacting biodiversity, as well as being a food source for humans and other predators.

== Etymology ==
The generic name Versuriga was derived from the genus Versura, originally described by Ernst Haeckel. The type species of the genus, Versura palmata, was found to instead be a specimen of Mastigias papua; the other species within Versura were regarded as doubtful and unidentifiable, rendering the genus name invalid. Paul Lassenius Kramp proposed Versuriga as a result in order to assign a genus to the previously described Crossostoma anadyomene, which Haeckel had earlier referred to Versura due to Crossostoma having been preoccupied. Versura is derived from the Latin versurus, meaning "about to turn (around)".

The specific epithet derives from the Ancient Greek word ἀναδυομένος (anaduoménos), meaning "emerging, surfacing".

== Description ==
Versuriga, like other members of the phylum Cnidaria, has its most notable feature being its umbrella shaped bell, reaching a diameter of up to 600 mm. Rather than being completely round or flat, its bell is made up of pointed grooves, growing in length closer to the center. Its body is mostly made up of umbrella and hemispherical shapes. This includes its muscular fields, which are also subumbrella shaped, as well as its canal features. Another of its identifiable features is its coloration, ranging from semi-translucently pink and purple at its center, eventually transitioning into a brown color. To distinguish between the Versuriga and other similar species, there are a few particular features to examine. There is a distinct difference between the shape of female and male genital double somites. Also, the structures of the appendages are discernible, specifically the antennae, maxillipeds, and legs. Between the female and male Versuriga, there are also morphological differences. Some of these differences include the male body being more slender, and that certain parts of the legs differ, in free segment length and endopod length.

== Life history ==
=== Life cycle ===
The Versurgia begins its life as an egg, laid by an adult medusa. The egg is dispersed through the water column, developing into a free-living, free-floating planula. It remains floating until it locates hard substrate in which it will attach to. While attached to the hard substrate, it further grows and develops, going through more stages of its life cycle, a scyphistoma and then a strobila stage. Finally, it is able to detach from the hard surface and becomes a youth medusa.

=== Feeding ===
As a member of the phylum Cnidaria, Versuriga are carnivorous, having a diet consisting mainly of drifting zooplankton.

== Distribution ==
Versuriga is a very rare sight, and thus has seldom been studied or recorded. Until recently, the majority of Scyphozoa sightings, the class that Versuriga belongs to, were unreliable as they were mostly first hand accounts rather than scientific recordings. However, it has been found off the coasts of Malaysia, Philippines, Indonesia, and Australia, Vietnam. Versuriga is an occupant of nearshore waters, where its food is most abundant. Recent studies in regards to Versuriga distributions in the Philippines found that Versuriga had highest abundance in Leyte Gulf, which was the location with the highest observed mean temperatures. This suggests that Versuriga may prefer or best thrive in warmer climates.

== Significance ==
=== Ecological ===
Versuriga is important in regards to both ecological and humanitarian impacts. Not only does Versuriga develop commensalism relationships with other organisms, but it also provides economic and agricultural gains to human society. Commensalism has significant implications, as the food and protection that jellyfish provide for other organisms contributes to biodiversity by allowing more species to survive than they would without said relationship. They are preyed upon by multiple predators in their habitat, including penguins, sea turtles, and tuna.

=== Humanitarian ===
Despite their importance to their ecosystem, jellyfish like Versuriga are still hunted by humans, causing devastation to their environments' biodiversity and their commensals. Recent studies highlight these impacts, as commensal abundance decreased in the Philippines likely as a result of the decreased presence and size of medusas. The Versuriga could, if its population rises, become a food source, alongside other species of jellyfish, for humans in certain regions; its rough tissue makes it particularly suited to usage in processed food. In terms of negative impact on humans, the nematocyst toxin of Versuriga could cause several harmful health concerns. Depending on tolerance to the toxin, one could experience rashes, welts, pain, and vomiting.

=== Symbiotic relationships ===
The Versuriga is a host for many microorganisms in their medusa stage. They can form a mutualistic relationship with these organisms. Food from photosynthetic dinoflagellates brings benefit and sustenance to the host Versuriga. Symbiotic algae can attach to the bell surface of the jellyfish, and the jellyfish lays upside-down on the seafloor to bring sunlight for their photosynthesis. Specifically, they can become a host to Paramacrochiron, being used parasitically for several purposes including: reproduction, food, and growth.
