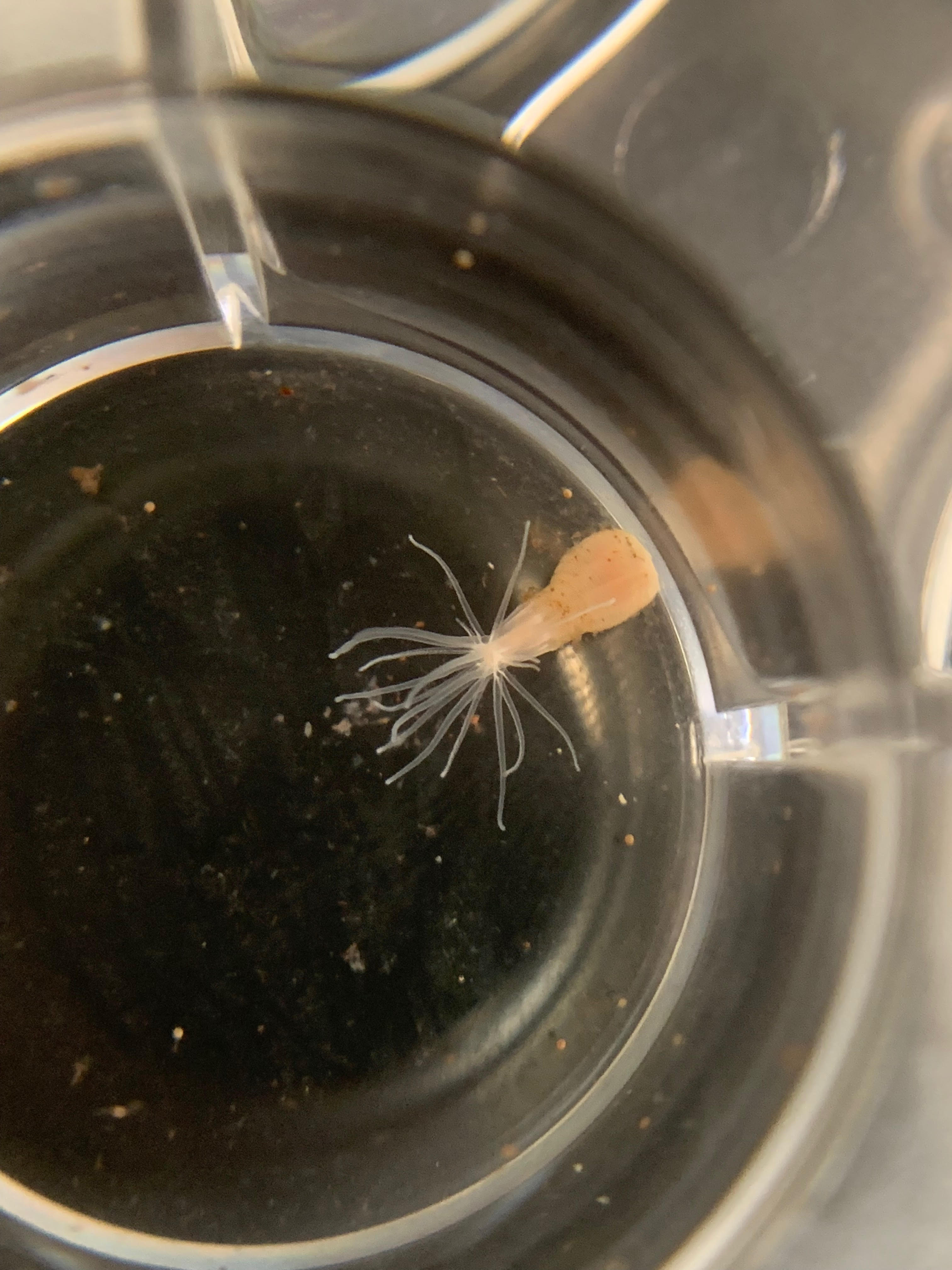

Scientific classification
- Kingdom: Animalia
- Phylum: Cnidaria
- Subphylum: Anthozoa
- Class: Hexacorallia
- Order: Actiniaria
- Family: Edwardsiidae
- Genus: Edwardsiella
- Species: E. lineata

Binomial name
- Edwardsiella lineata (Verrill, 1873)

Synonyms
- Edwardsia leidyi Verrill, 1898; Edwardsia lineata Verrill, 1873; Fagesia lineata (Verrill, 1873)

= Edwardsiella lineata =

Species of sea anemone

Edwardsiella lineata, the lined anemone, is a species of sea anemone in the family Edwardsiidae. It is native to the northwestern Atlantic Ocean where it occurs in the subtidal zone.

== Description ==
Edwardsiella lineata is a small, delicate-looking, white or brownish anemone with a typical length of 15-20 millimeters as an adult polyp. It has a simple body plan, possessing only 8 complete mesenteries, and 18-24 tentacles. The body of an adult is composed of four distinct regions defined by tissue type: the oral disc containing the tentacles, the capitulum which houses the actinopharynx or "gut", the scapus, and the aboral end. It is capable of lengthening and shortening its body using retractor and parietal muscles present on these mesenteries. It possesses various types of cnidae, including acontia (threadlike defensive organs thrown out of the mouth or special pores when irritated). It lives in a slender mucous tube immersed in sediment.

== Distribution and habitat ==
Edwardsiella lineata is native to shallow temperate waters in the northwestern Atlantic Ocean, where it occurs between Cape Cod and Cape Hatteras. It is typically found in rock crevices and on and under rocks in the sublittoral zone at depths to 20 m (66 ft), but can also be infaunal, burrowing in soft sediment. It sometimes occurs in large numbers. There have been reports of possible E. lineata in the Northeast Atlantic, though the organisms could only be confirmed down to the genus level. E. lineata is genetically almost indistinguishable from its close relative E. carnea, which is native to the Northeast Atlantic and whose life cycle is currently unknown.

== Biology ==
=== Reproduction ===
Edwardsiella lineata has a simple internal structure and is unusual among sea anemones in that it can divide by transverse fission. This type of asexual reproduction can be achieved through either physal pinching or polarity reversal. In physal pinching, a constriction occurs at the aboral (physal) end of the anemone and the fragment then "pinches" off, at which point the fragment regenerates to form a fully functional adult polyp. During polarity reversal, oral structures form at the aboral end of the anemone resulting in an animal with two oral ends. Physal tissue then forms at the midpoint of the oral ends and a constriction separates the two anemones. It can also reproduce sexually through broadcast spawning and the resulting planula larva has recently evolved a partially parasitic lifestyle

=== Effect on humans ===
The planula larvae are sometimes the cause of a form of irritating dermatitis in humans known as seabather's eruption. When the larvae get trapped under swimwear they defend themselves by firing their venomous nematocysts into the skin, causing a red blotchy rash that may blister. No treatment is required, and the symptoms subside after a week or two.

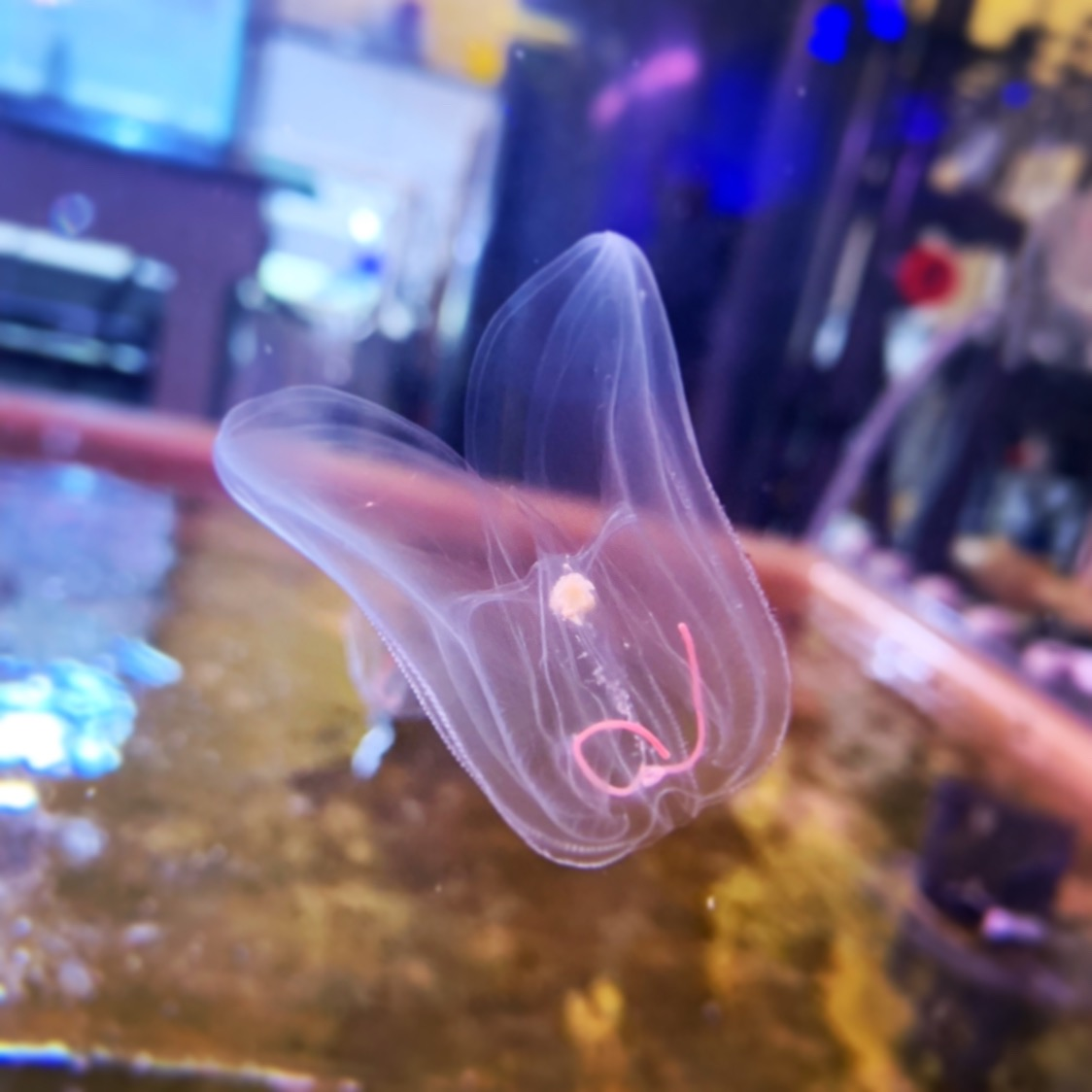
Several E. lineata inside a lab specimen of M. leidyi collected from the field

== Parasitic life history ==
=== Mnemiopsis leidyi ===
Edwardsiella lineata is the only known member of the Edwardsiidae family to have a parasitic life stage. Upon fertilization, a primary planula develops. Instead of direct development into an adult polyp like many other anemone species such as its close relative Nematostella vectensis, it infects a species of pelagic ctenophore known as Mnemiopsis leidyi. The planula can infect its host in two ways: burrowing through epidermal walls or burrowing through gastrodermal walls into the gut after being eaten by an M. leidyi. It is common for a single M. leidyi to harbor multiple E. lineata parasites. On entering a host, the larva adopts a worm-like appearance and feeds on the contents of the host's gut. When sufficiently developed, or if the host dies, it exits the host and regains its planula larval form. If another host is available it can once again adopt the worm-like phase, but if no new host is available, it can settle on the seabed and undergo metamorphosis into a juvenile sea anemone polyp. This metamorphosis can take as little as three days. If the parasitic larva is artificially excised from its host it may also undergo metamorphosis into a polyp, presumably because manual excision mimics natural death of the host or the parasite voluntarily leaving. E. lineata has been proposed as a possible biological control on the voracious planktivore M. leidyi, though this has yet to be artificially implemented. Infected ctenophores have lower growth rates than their non-infected counterparts, sometimes even negative growth rates, or "shrinking", leading to thoughts that E. lineata could help depress the population of M. leidyi in areas where it becomes damaging to fisheries.

=== Beroe ovata ===
In addition to being found inside M. leidyi, E. lineata has been found inside another species of ctenophore known as Beroe ovata. However, evidence suggests that this is the result of a secondary infection and that B. ovata is not the first or intended host. B. ovata are known to prey on M. leidyi, and it is presumed that when a B. ovata consumes an infected M. leidyi, that the E. lineata parasites then embed themselves in the tissue of the B. ovata. This is evidenced by the fact that E. lineata parasites are often found in the radial canals of B. ovata, rather than the gut area like in M. leidyi, suggesting that the E. lineata aren't using the B. ovata to feed but rather ended up there through predation.
