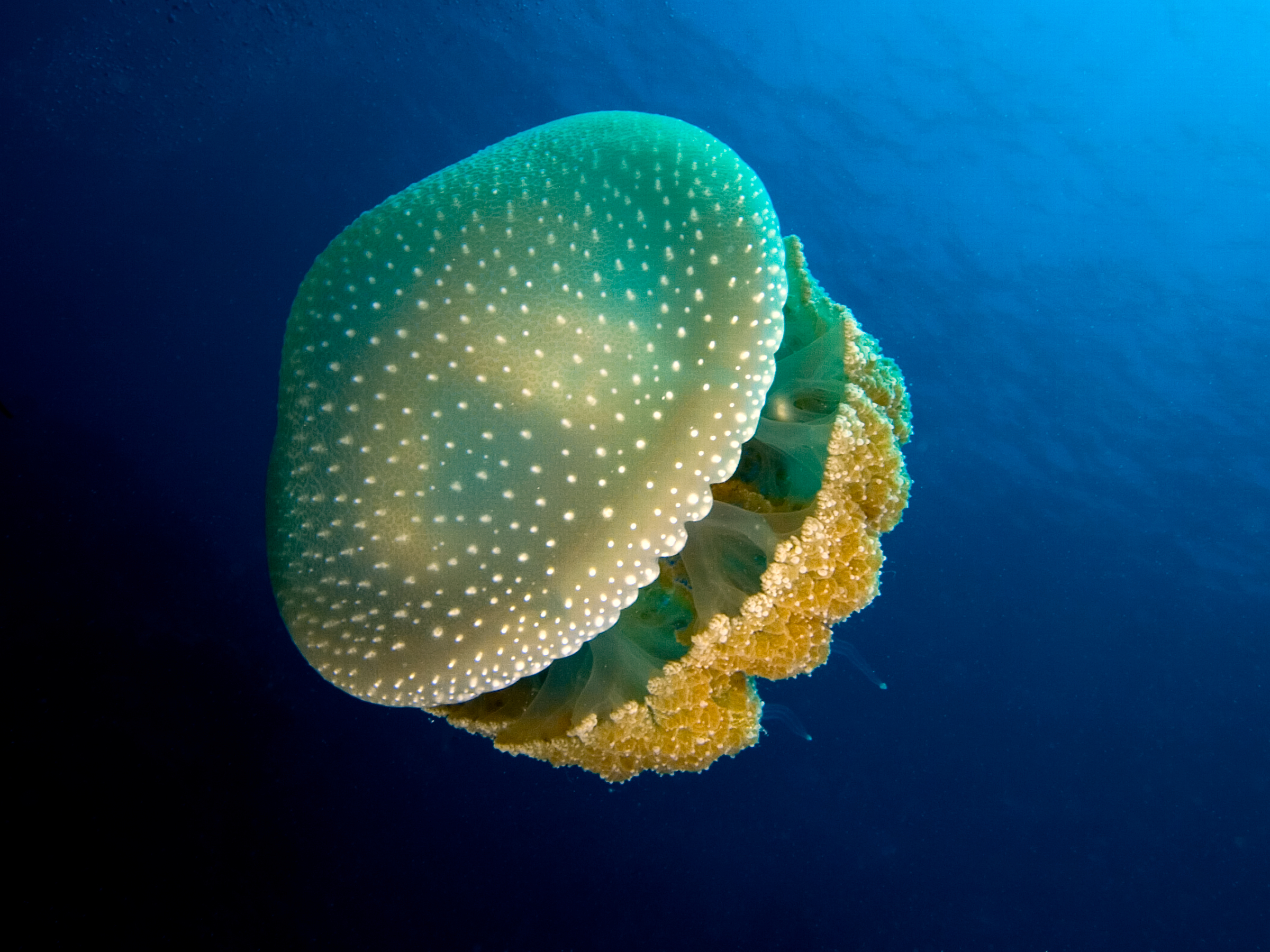
- Phyllorhiza punctata

Scientific classification
- Kingdom: Animalia
- Phylum: Cnidaria
- Class: Scyphozoa
- Order: Rhizostomeae
- Suborder: Kolpophorae
- Family: Mastigiidae; Stiasny, 1921

Genera
- 3-4, see text

= Mastigiidae =

Family of jellyfishes

Mastigiidae is a family of true jellyfish. The family is native to the Indo-Pacific, but a species of Mastigias has been introduced to the West Atlantic, and Phyllorhiza punctata has been introduced to the West Atlantic and Mediterranean Sea.

== Genera ==
According to the World Register of Marine Species, this family includes 4 genera:

- Mastigias
- Mastigietta
- Phyllorhiza
- Versuriga – probably belongs in a separate monotypic family, Versurigidae.
