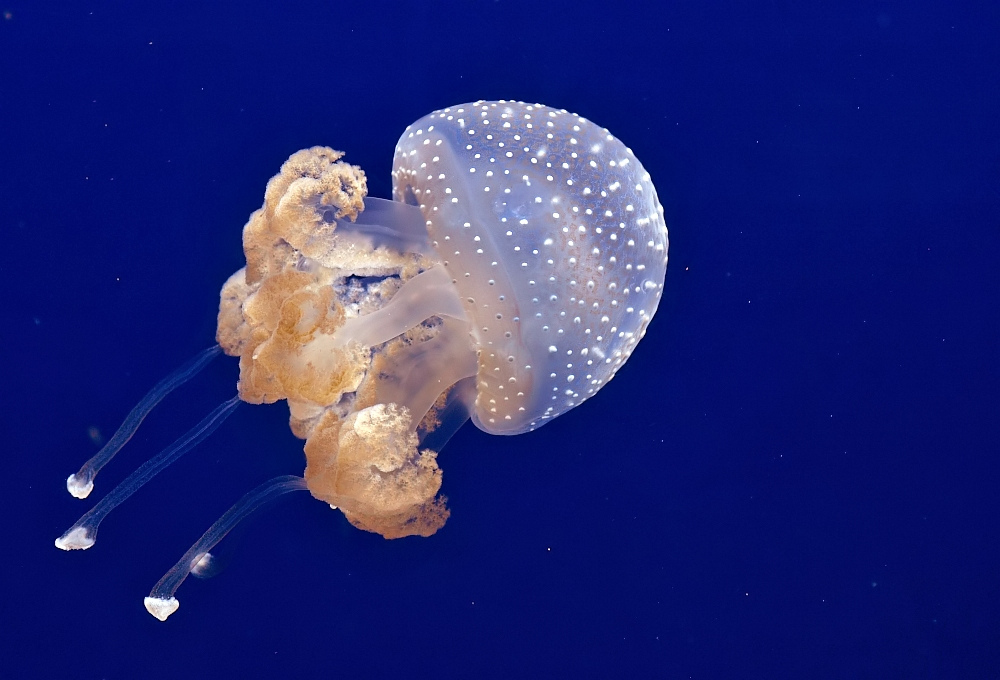
- Phyllorhiza punctata

Scientific classification
- Kingdom: Animalia
- Phylum: Cnidaria
- Class: Scyphozoa
- Subclass: Discomedusae
- Order: Rhizostomeae; Cuvier, 1799

= Rhizostomeae =

Order of jellyfish with eight branched oral arms

Rhizostomeae is an order of jellyfish. Species of this order have neither tentacles nor other structures at the bell's edges. Instead, they have eight highly branched oral arms, along which there are suctorial minimouth orifices. (This is in contrast to other scyphozoans, which have four of these arms.) These oral arms become fused as they approach the central part of the jellyfish. The mouth of the animal is also subdivided into minute pores that are linked to coelenteron.

== Edible jellyfish ==
Jellyfish species fished on a commercial basis for human consumption (both as a delicacy and for use in traditional medicine) are all from this order and include members of the families Catostylidae, Lobonematidae, Rhizostomatidae and Stomolophidae. The jellyfish are typically dried and/or salted. In China, the first country documented to use jellyfish as food, this has been practiced at least since the year 300 CE, but they are also commonly consumed in Japan (the largest consumer of jellyfish today), Korea and southeast Asia. Several countries outside Asia have also started catching and exporting these in recent decades.

== Taxonomy ==
As of 2007, there were 92 recognized extant species in Rhizostomeae. These belong in the following families:

- Suborder Daktyliophorae
  - Family Catostylidae Gegenbaur, 1857 -- 7 genera
  - Family Lobonematidae Stiasny, 1921 -- 2 genera
  - Family Lychnorhizidae Haeckel, 1880 -- 3 genera
  - Family Rhizostomatidae Cuvier, 1799 -- 4 genera
  - Family Stomolophidae Haeckel, 1880 -- 1 genus
- Suborder Kolpophorae
  - Family Cassiopeidae Agassiz, 1862 -- 1 genus
  - Family Cepheidae Agassiz, 1862 -- 5 genera
  - Family Mastigiidae Stiasny, 1921 -- 5 genera
  - Family Thysanostomatidae Gegenbaur, 1857 -- 1 genus
  - Family Versurigidae Gegenbaur, 1857 (empty taxa)
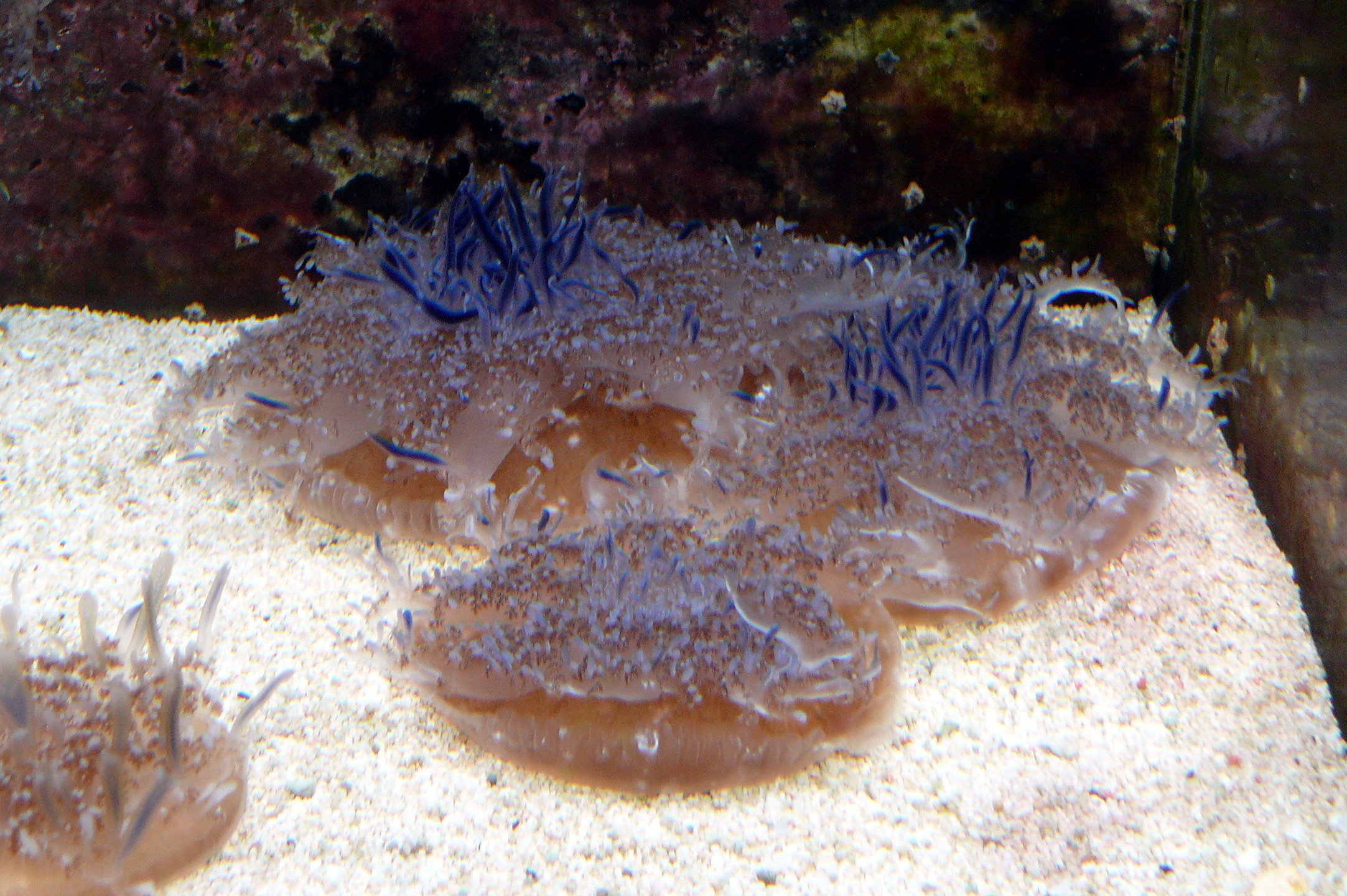
Cassiopea andromeda, a Cassiopeidae (upside-down jellyfish)

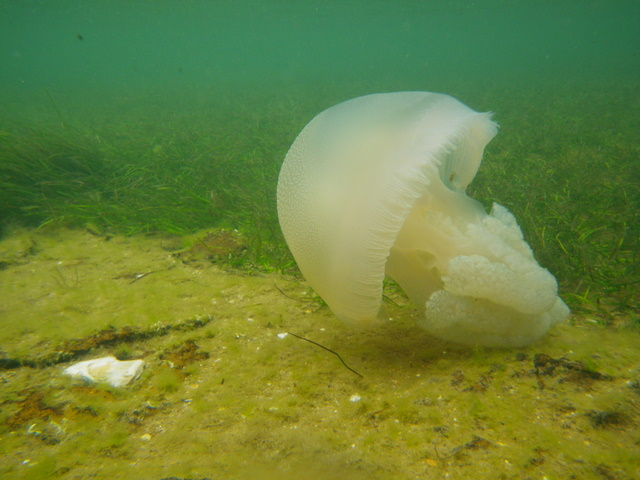
Catostylus mosaicus, a Catostylidae

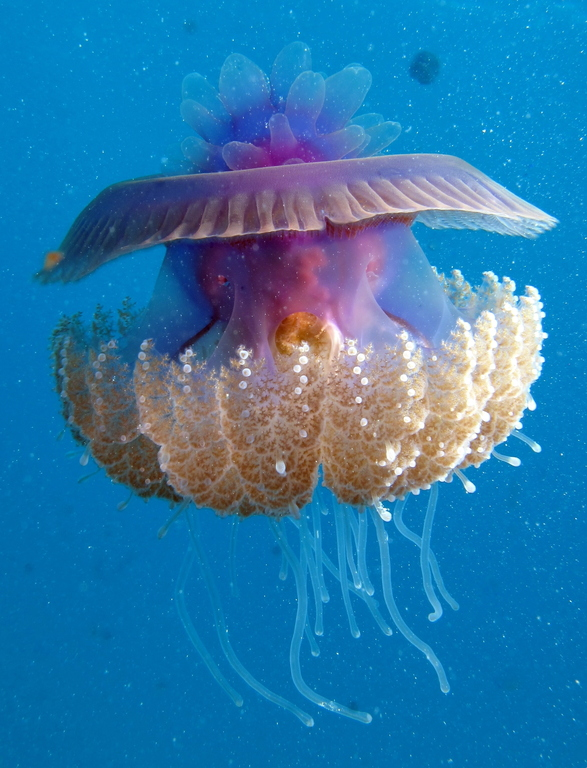
Cephea cephea, a Cepheidae

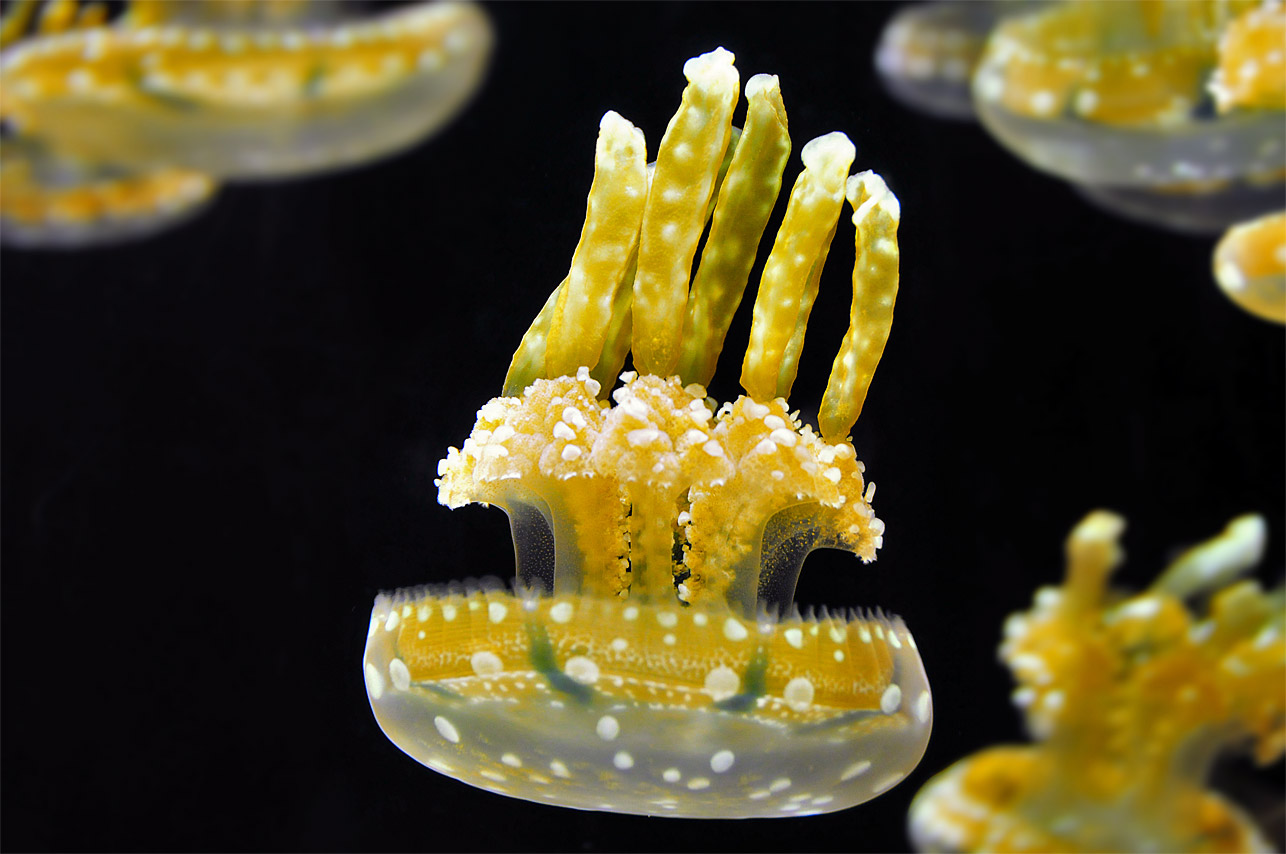
Mastigias papua, a Mastigiidae

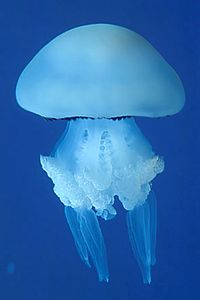
Rhizostoma pulmo, a Rhizostomatidae

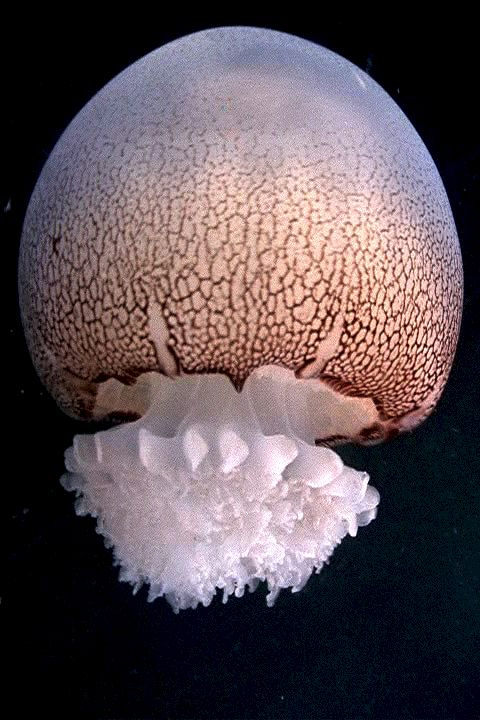
Stomolophus meleagris, a Stomolophidae

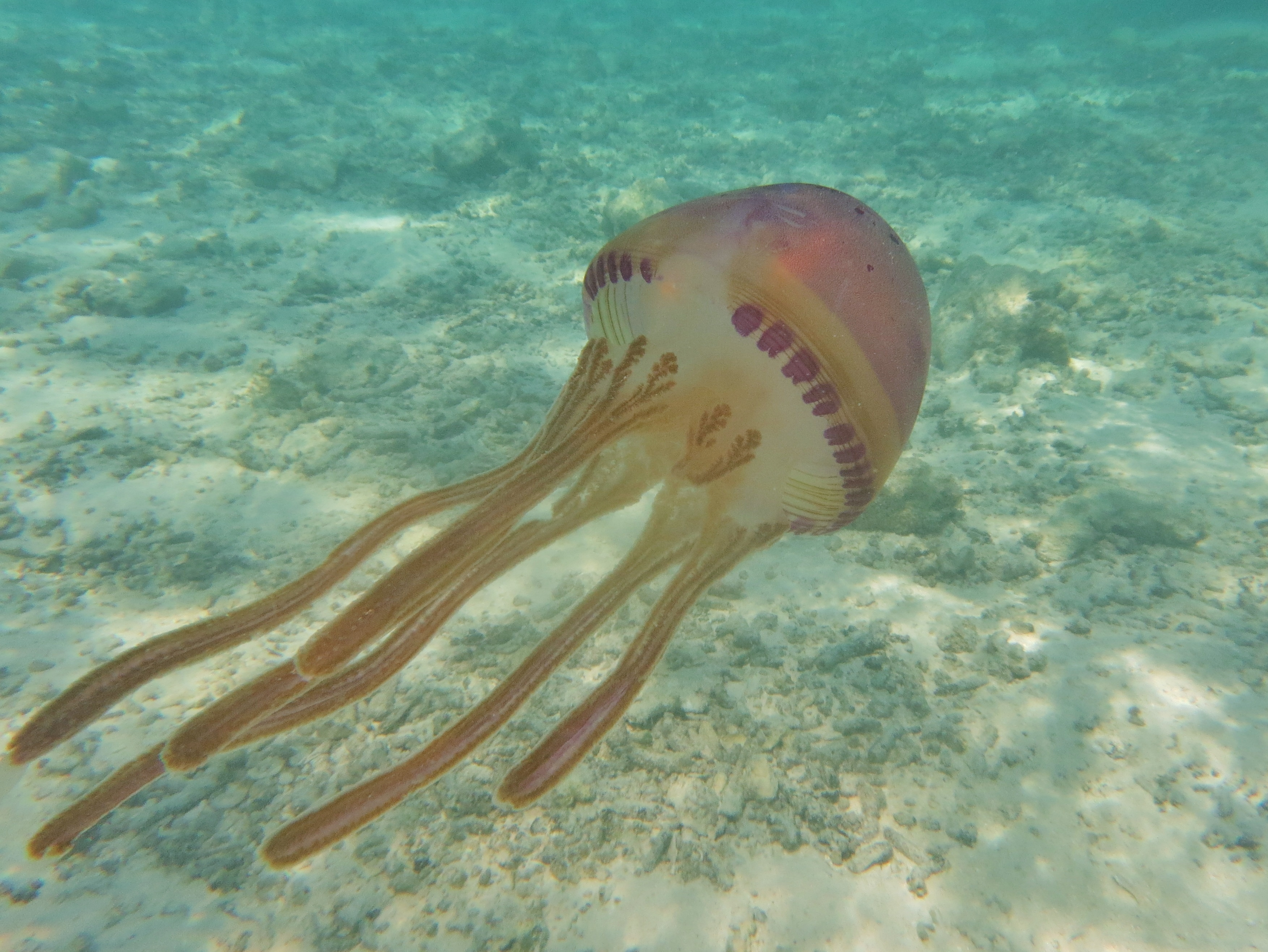
Thysanostoma loriferum, a Thysanostomatidae
