= Kunstformen der Natur =

Book of stylised symmetrical illustrations of animals by Ernst Haeckel

Kunstformen der Natur (Art Forms in Nature)
- Author: Ernst Haeckel
- Language: German
- Subject: Natural history, biology, art
- Genre: Non-fiction
- Publication date: Published in sets between 1899 and 1904; collectively in two volumes in 1904
- Publication place: Germany

Kunstformen der Natur (known in English as Art Forms in Nature) is a book of lithographic and halftone prints by German biologist Ernst Haeckel.

== Publication ==
Originally published in sets of ten between 1899 and 1904 and collectively in two volumes in 1904, it consists of 100 prints of various organisms, many of which were first described by Haeckel himself. Over the course of his career, over 1000 prints were produced based on Haeckel's sketches and watercolors; many of the best of these were chosen for Kunstformen der Natur, translated from sketch to print by lithographer Adolf Giltsch.

A second edition of Kunstformen, containing only 30 prints, was produced in 1914.

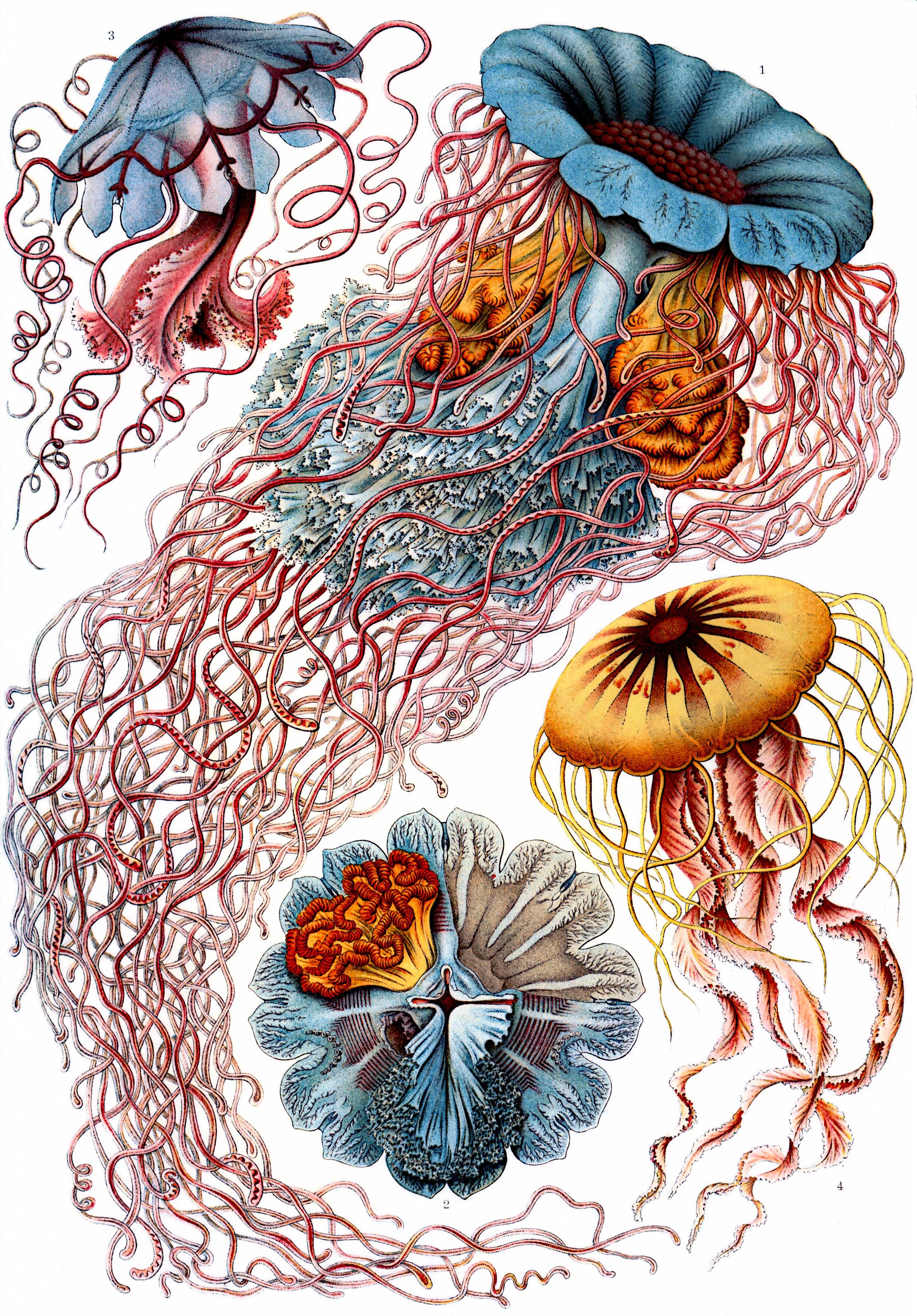
The 8th print, Discomedusae. The center and bottom-center images are Desmonema annasethe.

== Themes ==
According to Haeckel scholar Olaf Breidbach, the work was "not just a book of illustrations but also the summation of his view of the world." The over-riding themes of the Kunstformen plates are symmetry and level of organization. The subjects were selected to embody these to the full, from the scale patterns of boxfishes to the spirals of ammonites to the perfect symmetries of jellies and microorganisms, while images composing each plate are arranged for maximum visual impact.

Among the notable prints are numerous radiolarians, which Haeckel helped to popularize among amateur microscopists; at least one example is found in almost every set of 10. Cnidaria also feature prominently throughout the book, including sea anemones as well as Siphonophorae, Semaeostomeae, and other medusae. The first set included Desmonema annasethe (now Cyanea annasethe), a particularly striking jellyfish that Haeckel observed and described shortly after the death of his wife Anna Sethe; the tentacles reminded him of her long flowing hair.

== Influence ==
Kunstformen der Natur was influential in early 20th-century art, architecture, and design, bridging the gap between science and art. In particular, many artists associated with Art Nouveau were influenced by Haeckel's images, including René Binet, Karl Blossfeldt, Hans Christiansen, and Émile Gallé. One prominent example is the Amsterdam Commodities Exchange designed by Hendrik Petrus Berlage: it was in part inspired by Kunstformen illustrations.

== Gallery of prints ==
Haeckel's original classifications appear in italics.

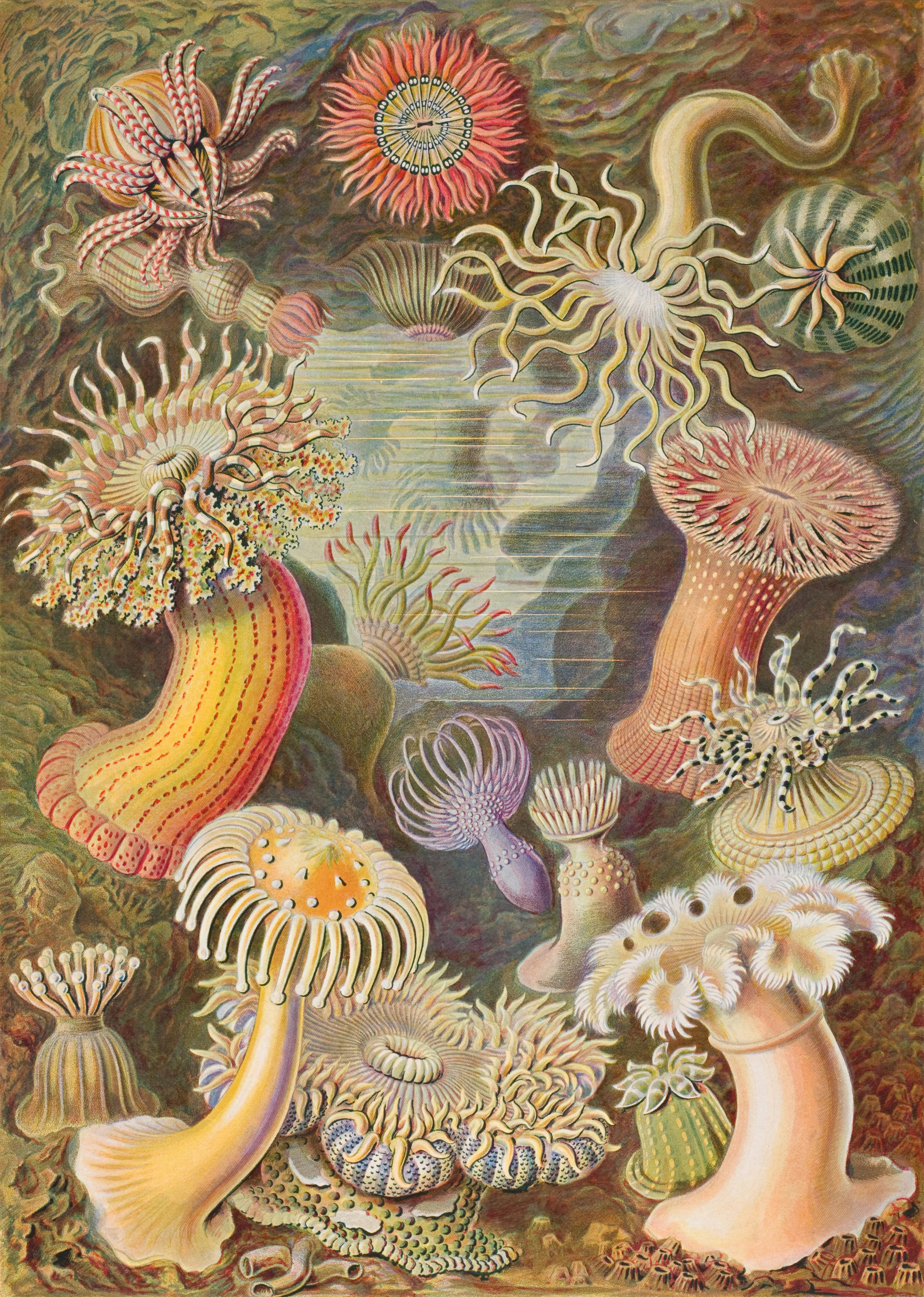
Sea anemone (Actiniae)

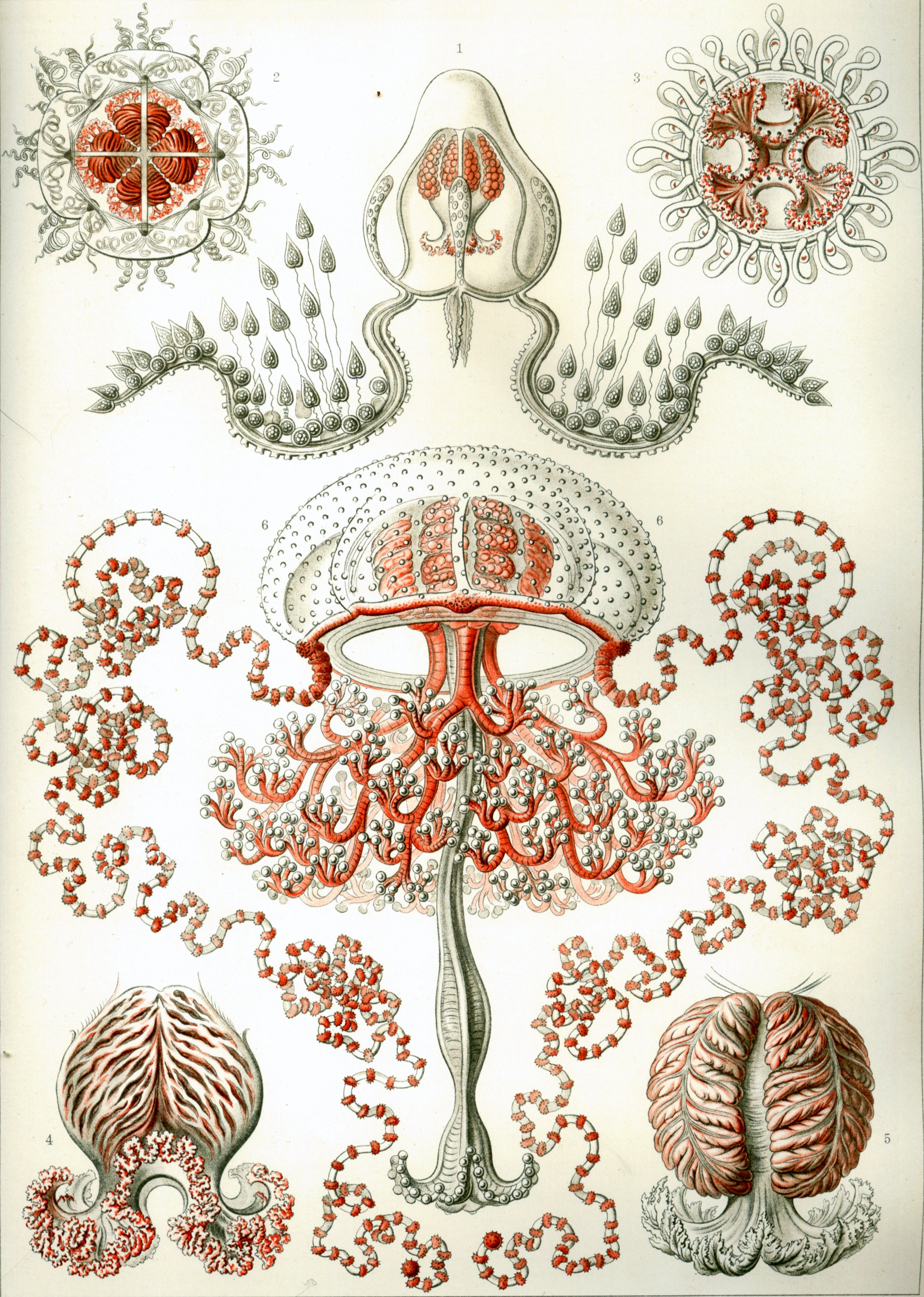
Anthomedusa (Anthomedusae)

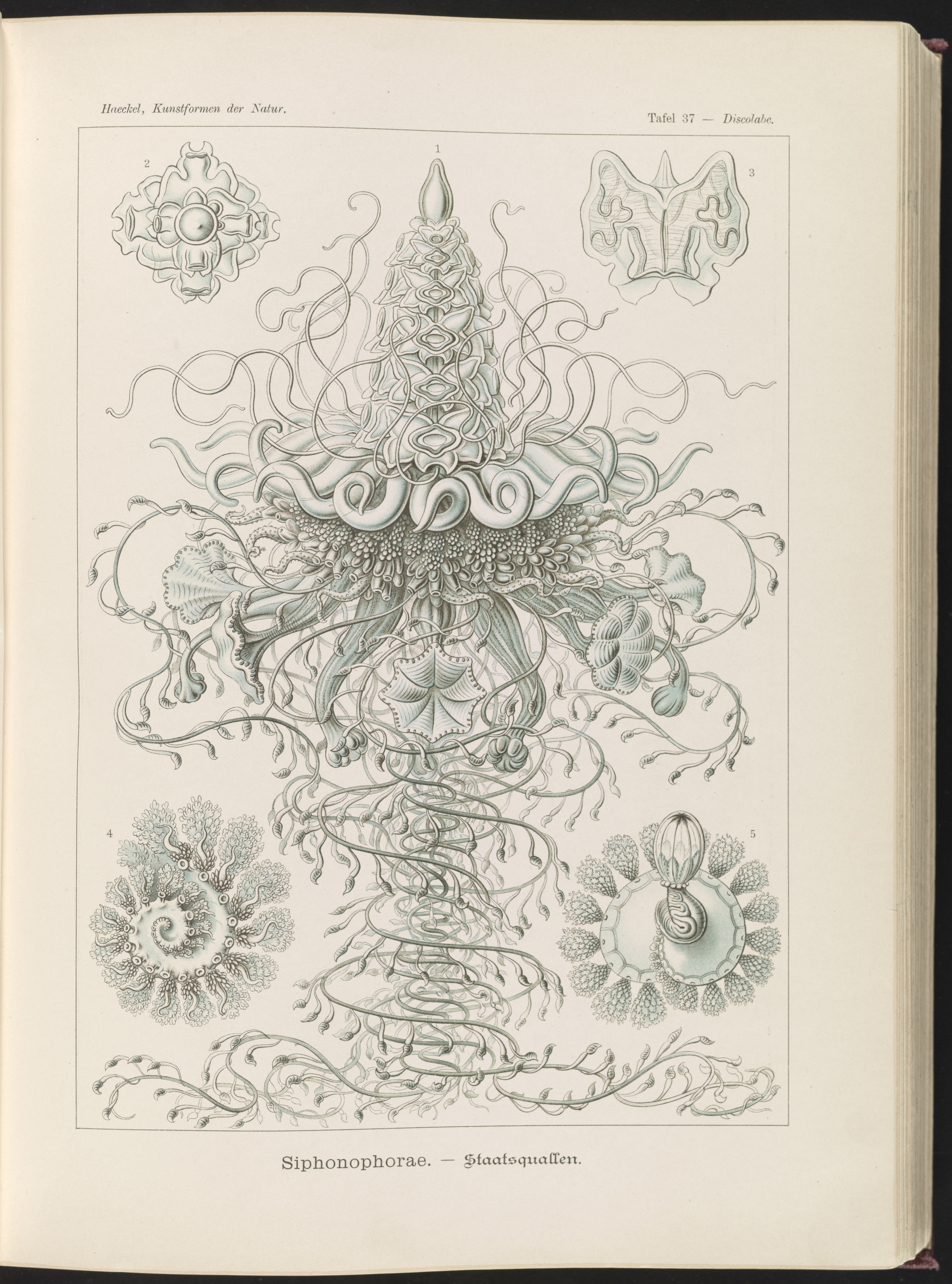
Siphonophore (Siphonophorae)

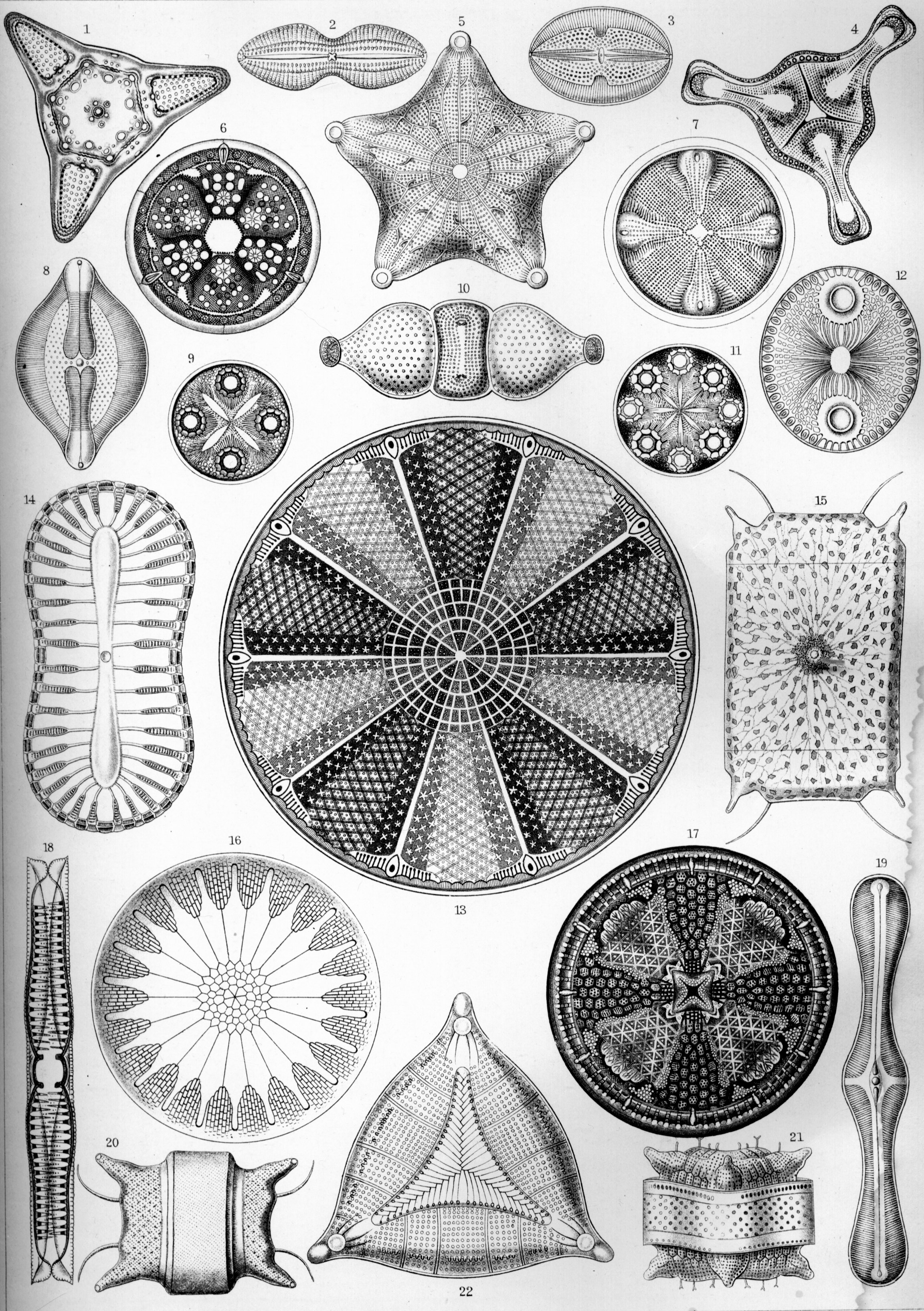
Diatoms (Diatomea)

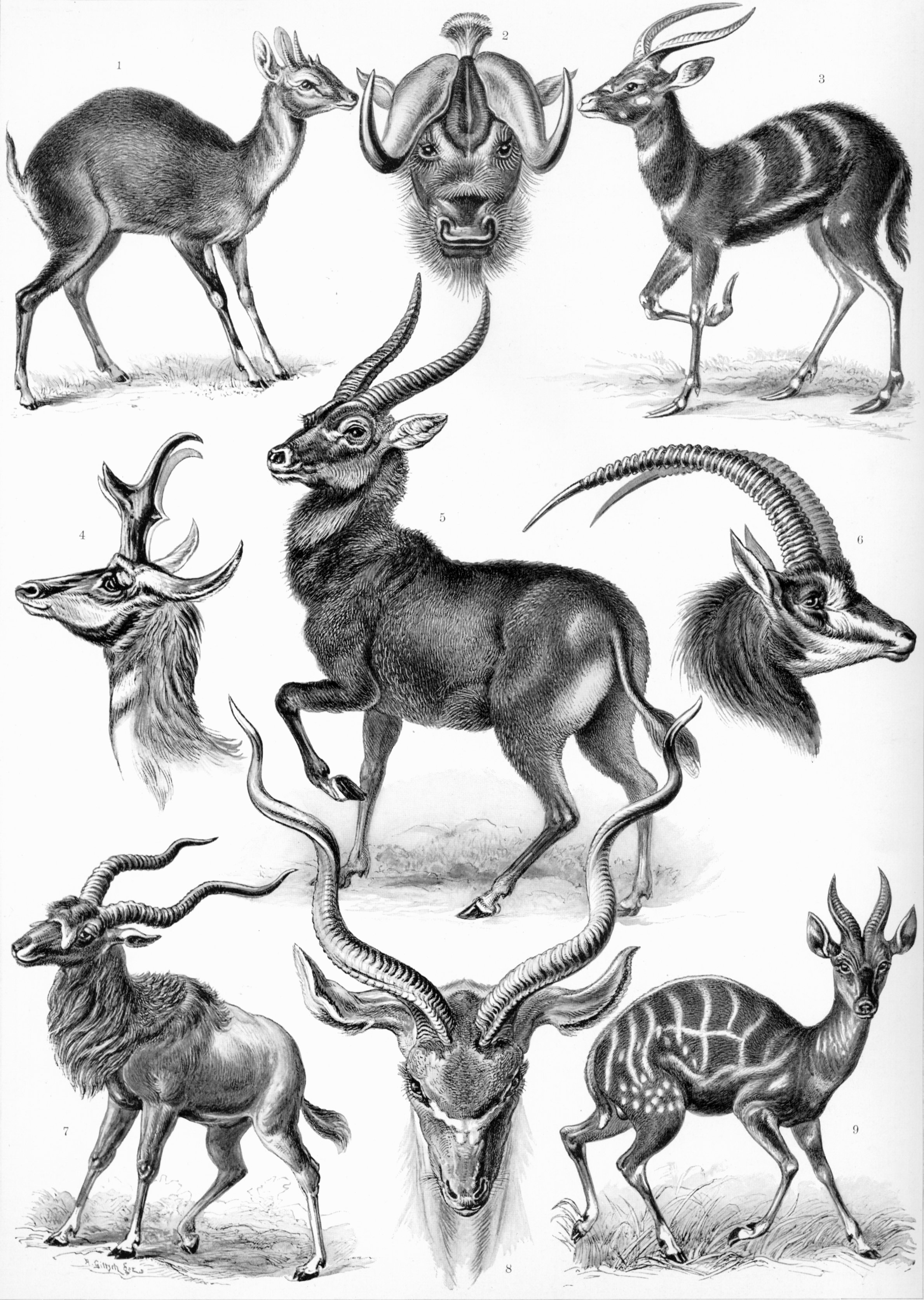
Antelope (Antilopina)

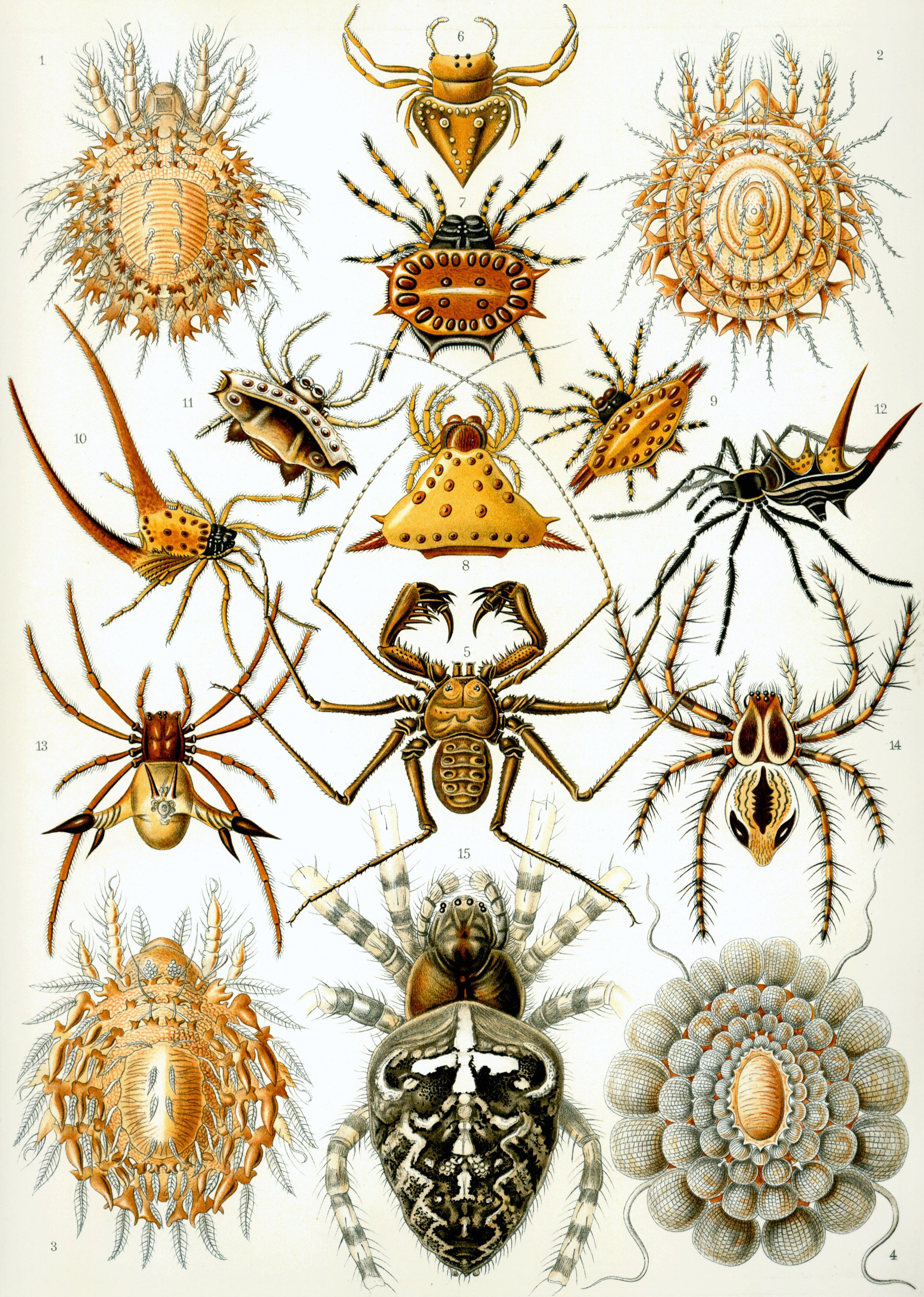
Arachnid (Arachnida)

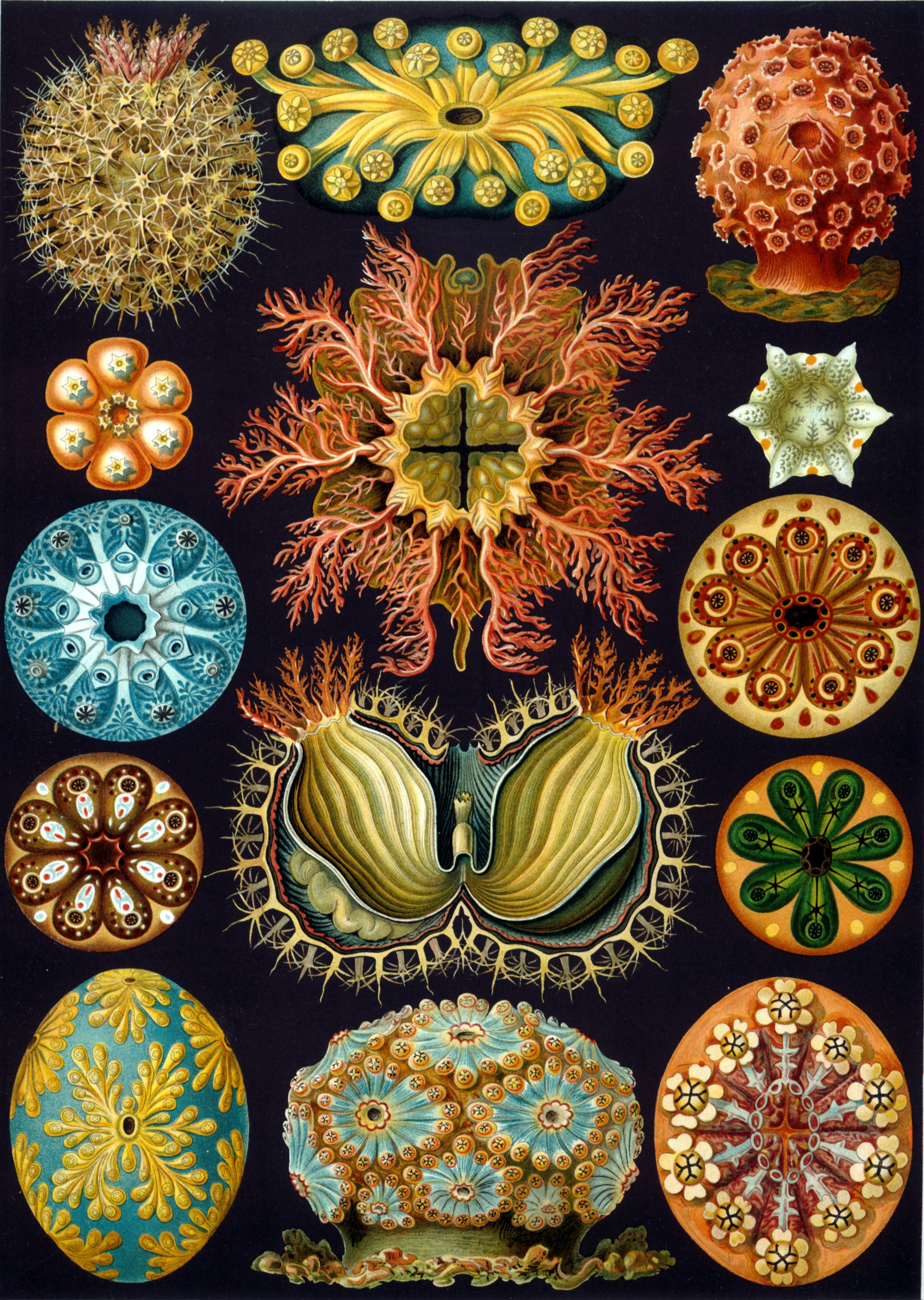
Ascidian (Ascidiae)

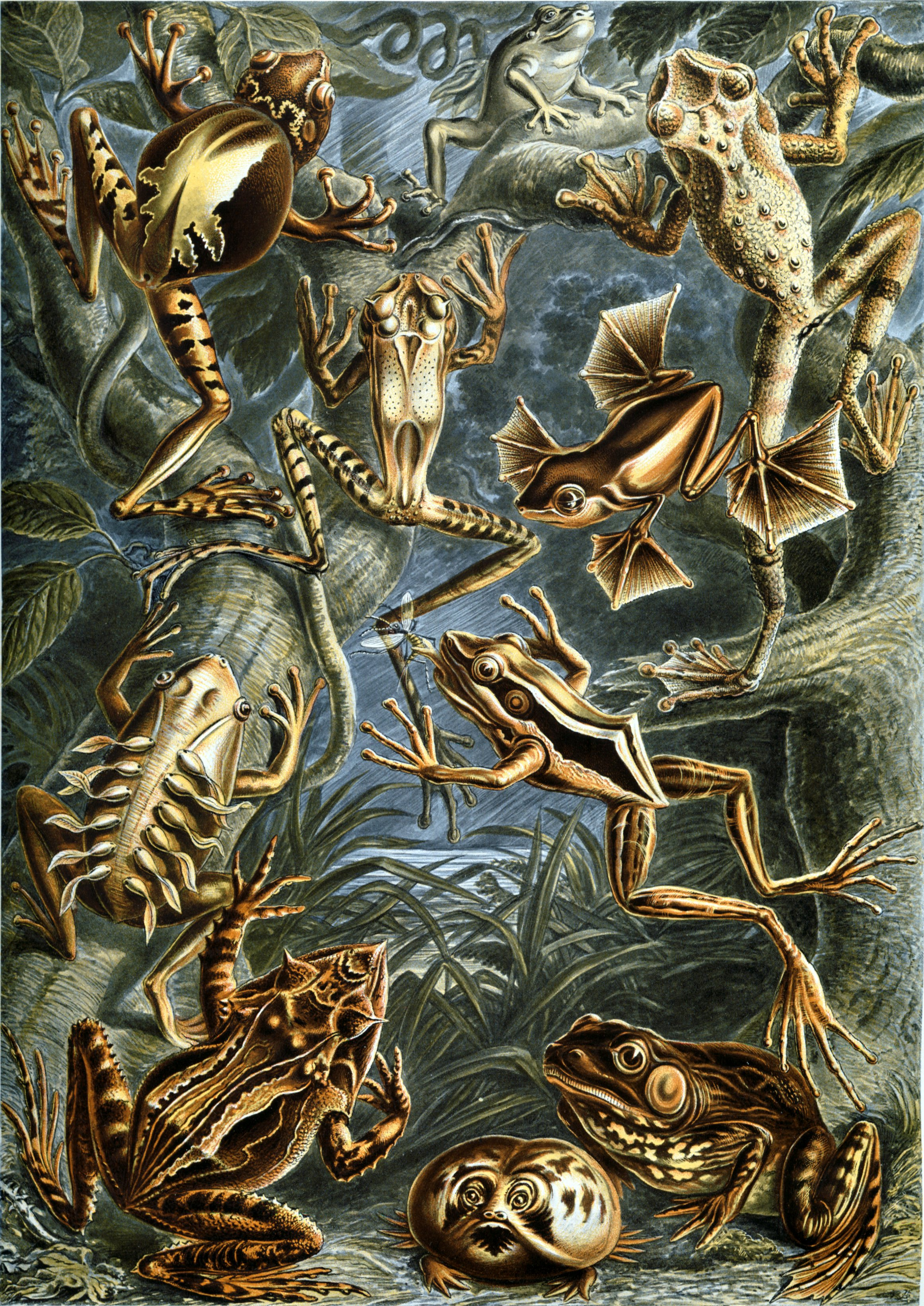
Frog (Batrachia)

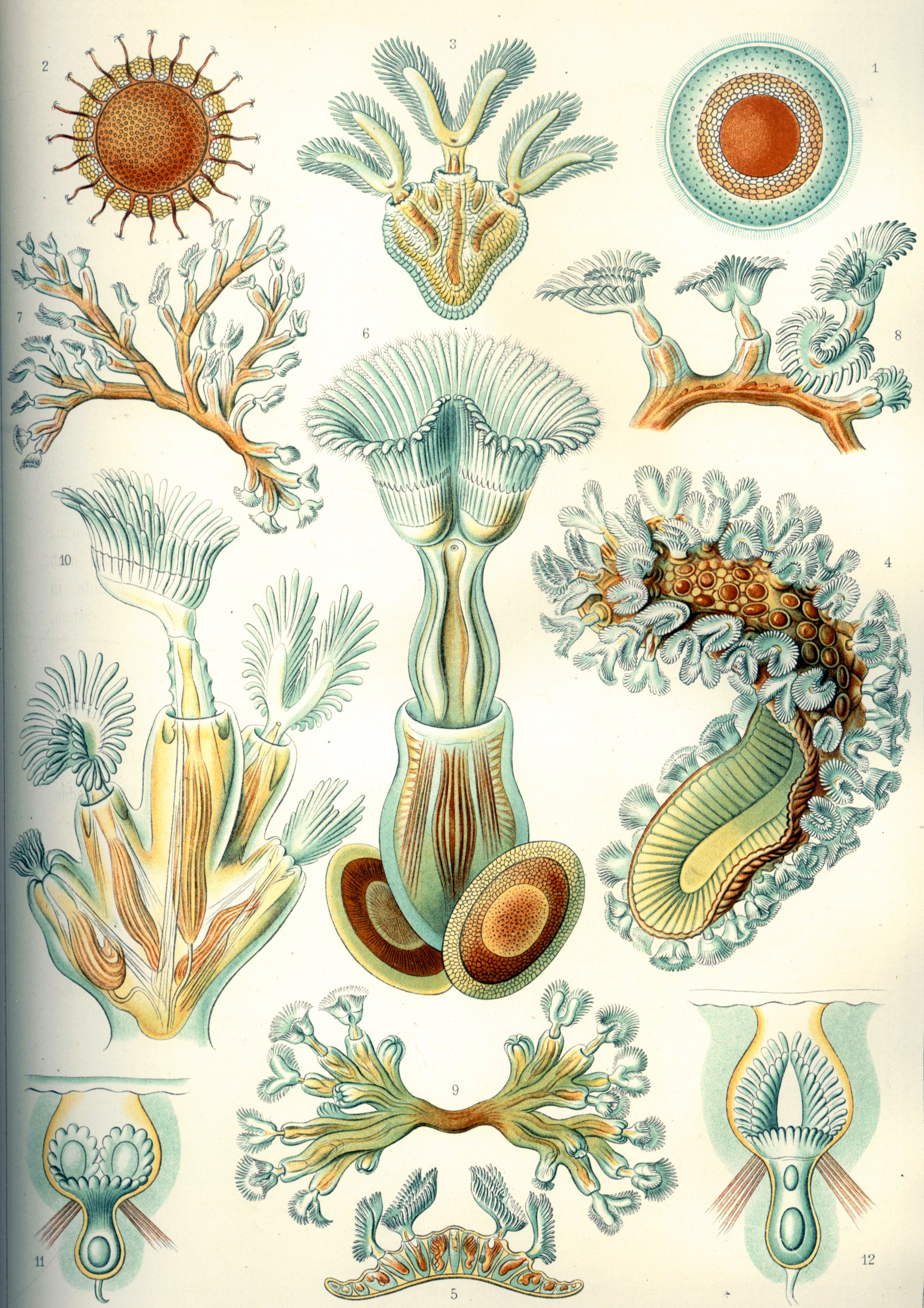
Bryozoa

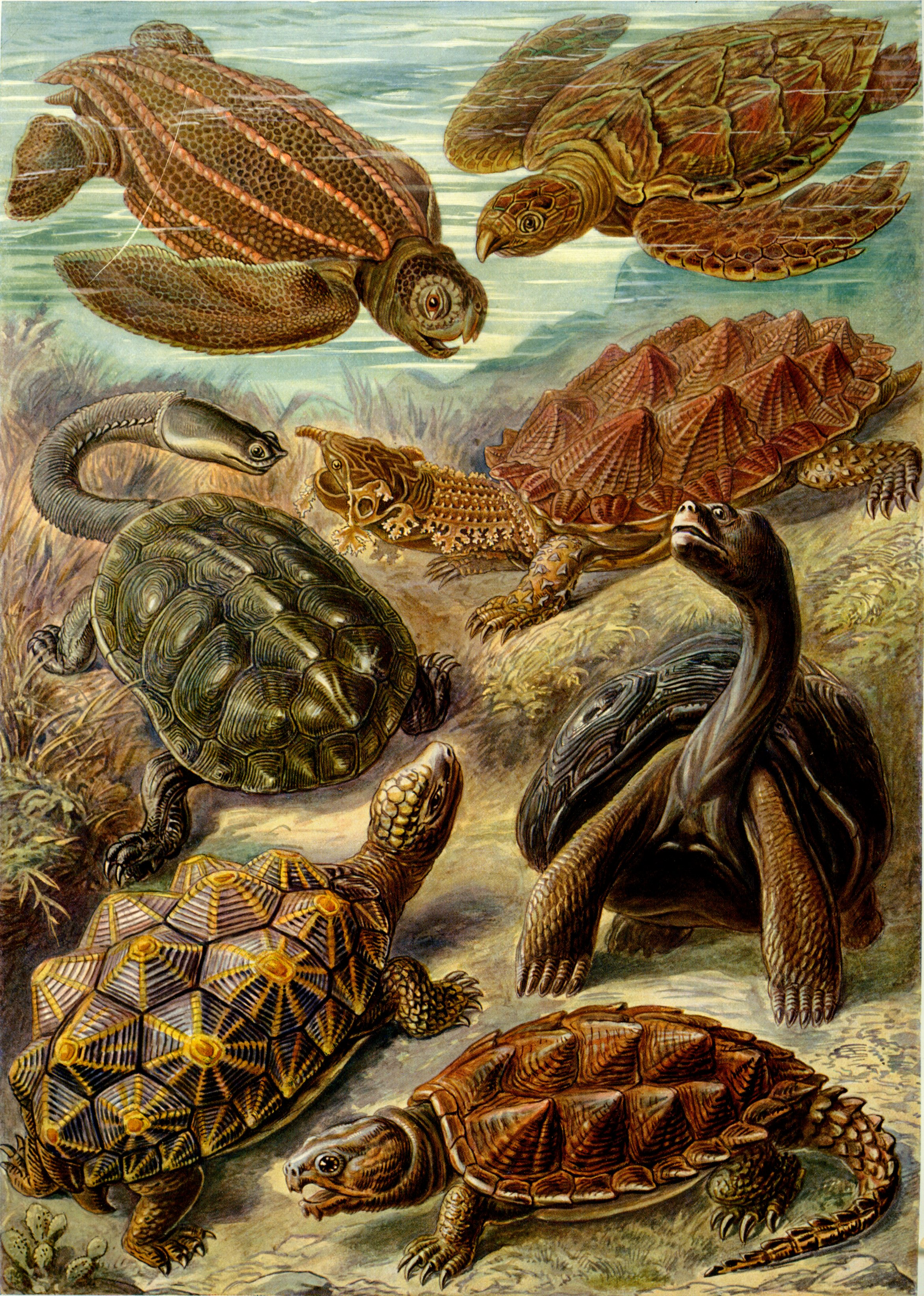
Turtle (Chelonia)

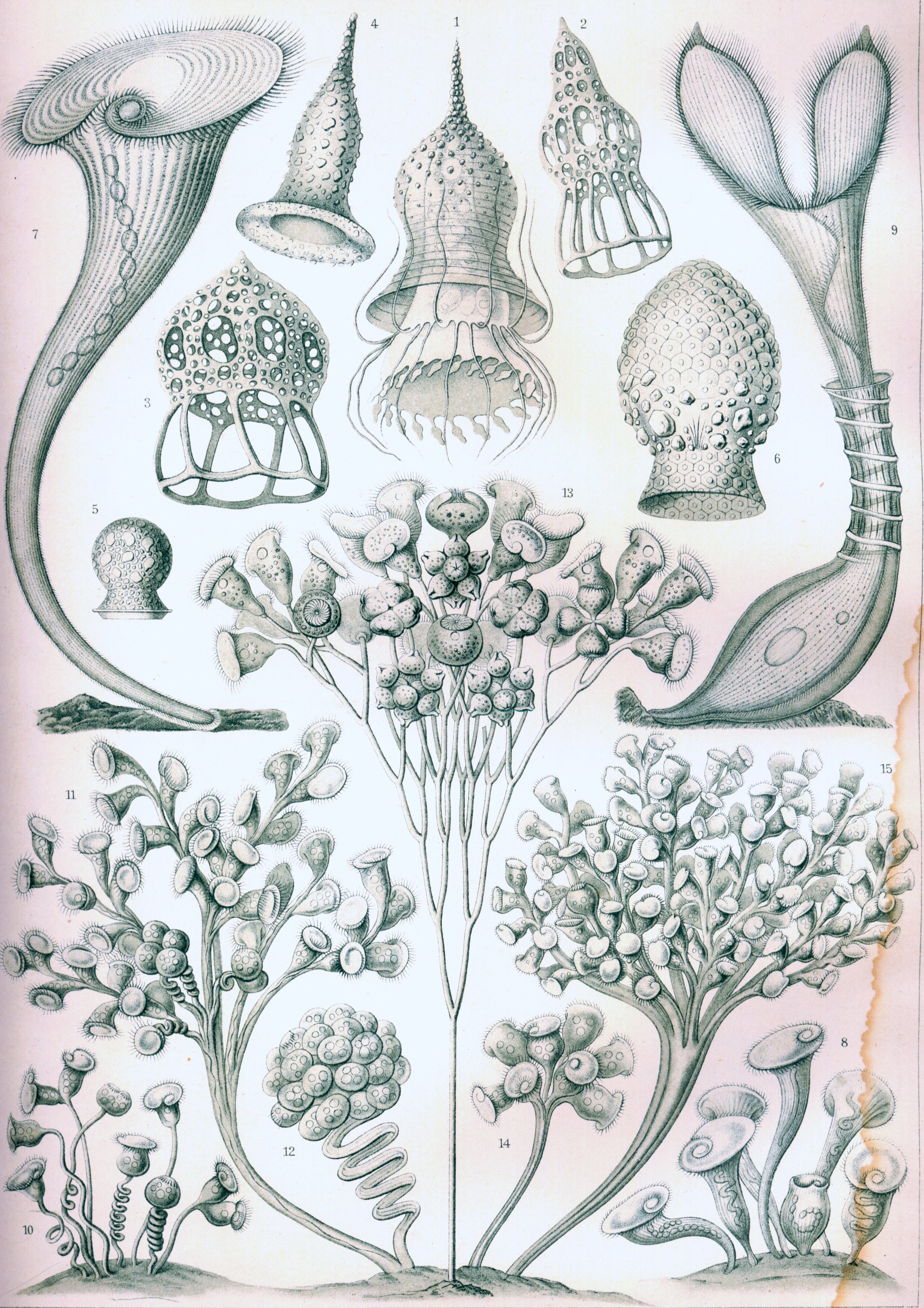
Ciliate (Ciliata)

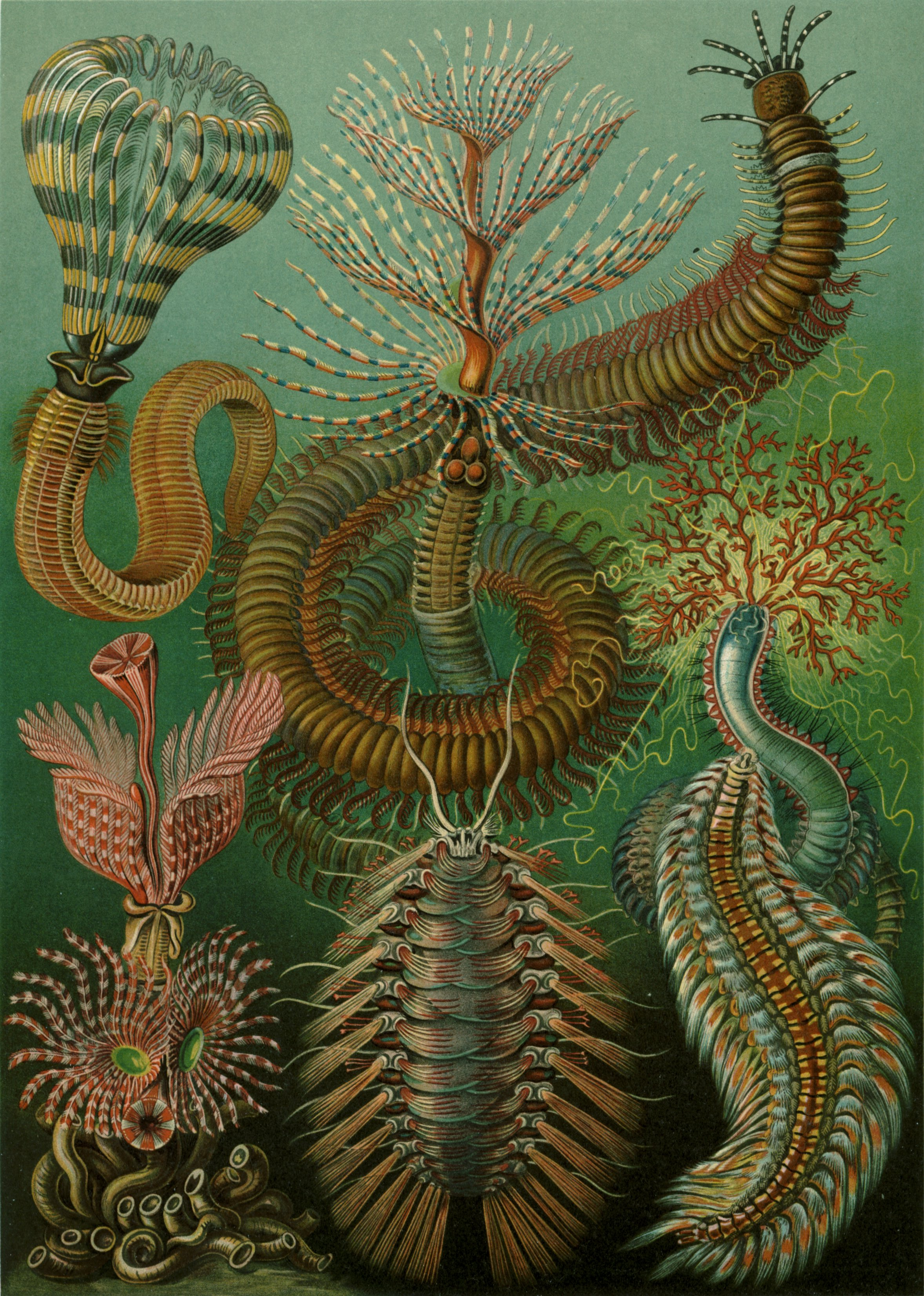
Annelid (Chaetopoda)

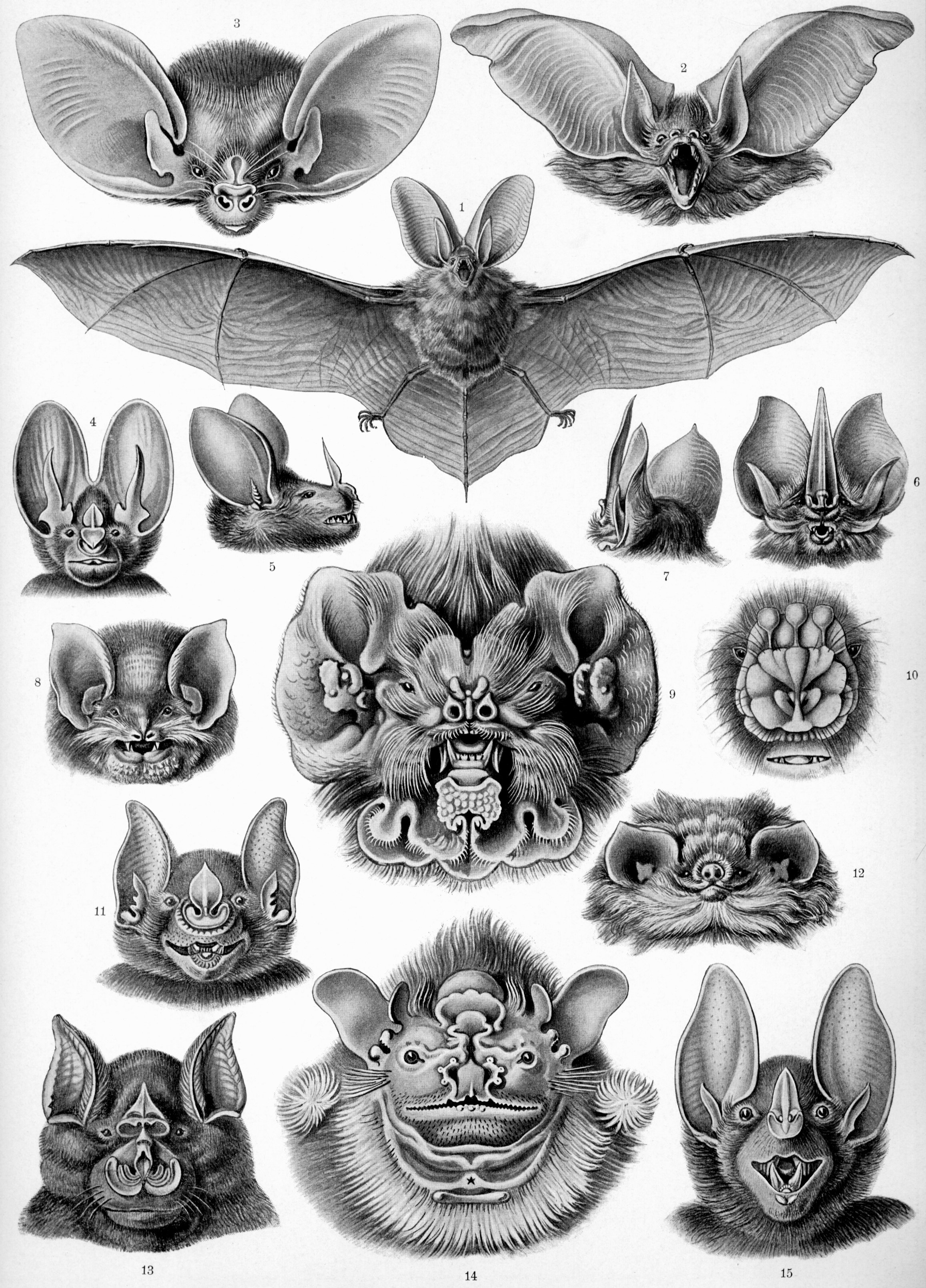
Bat (Chiroptera)

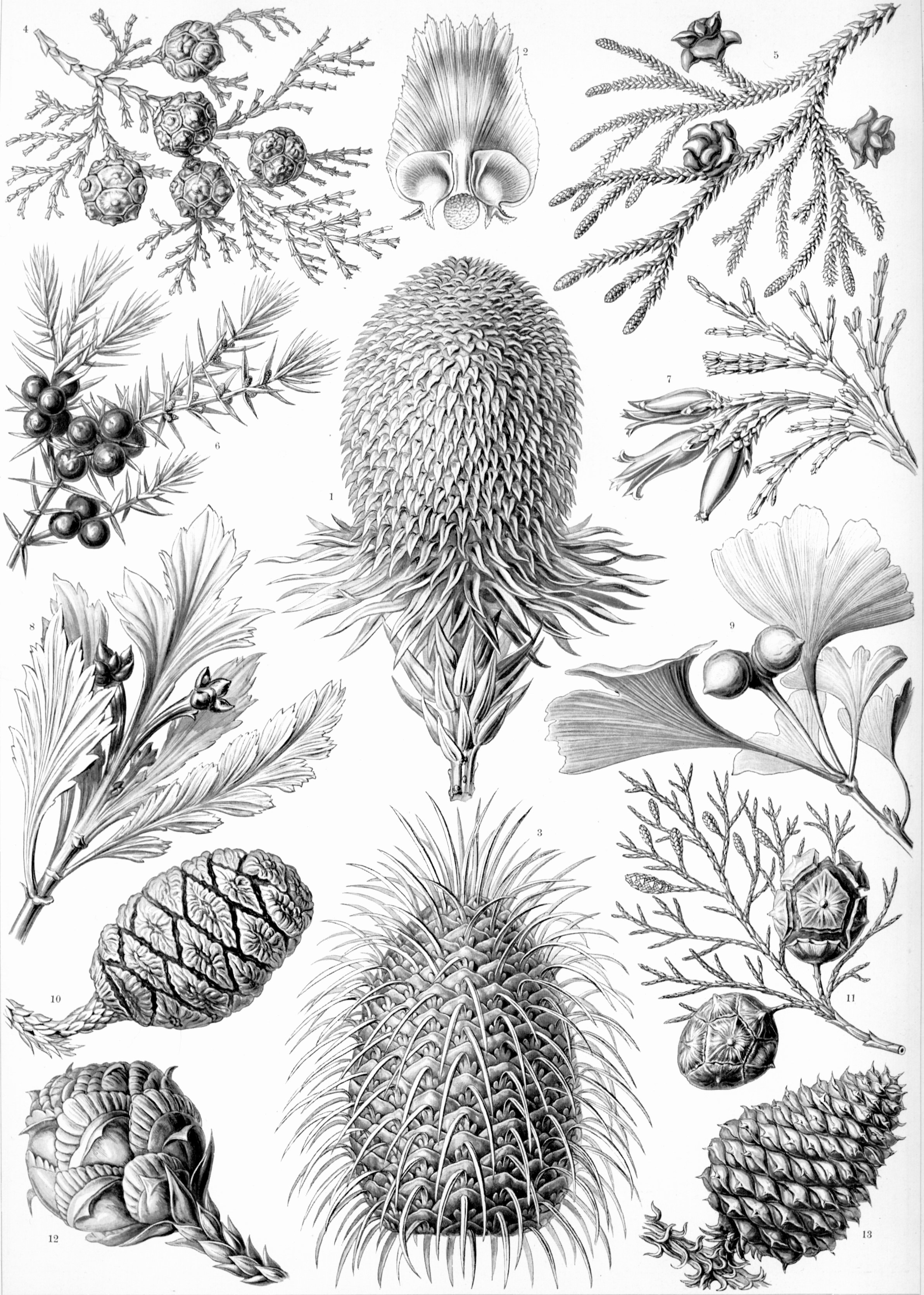
Conifer (Coniferae)

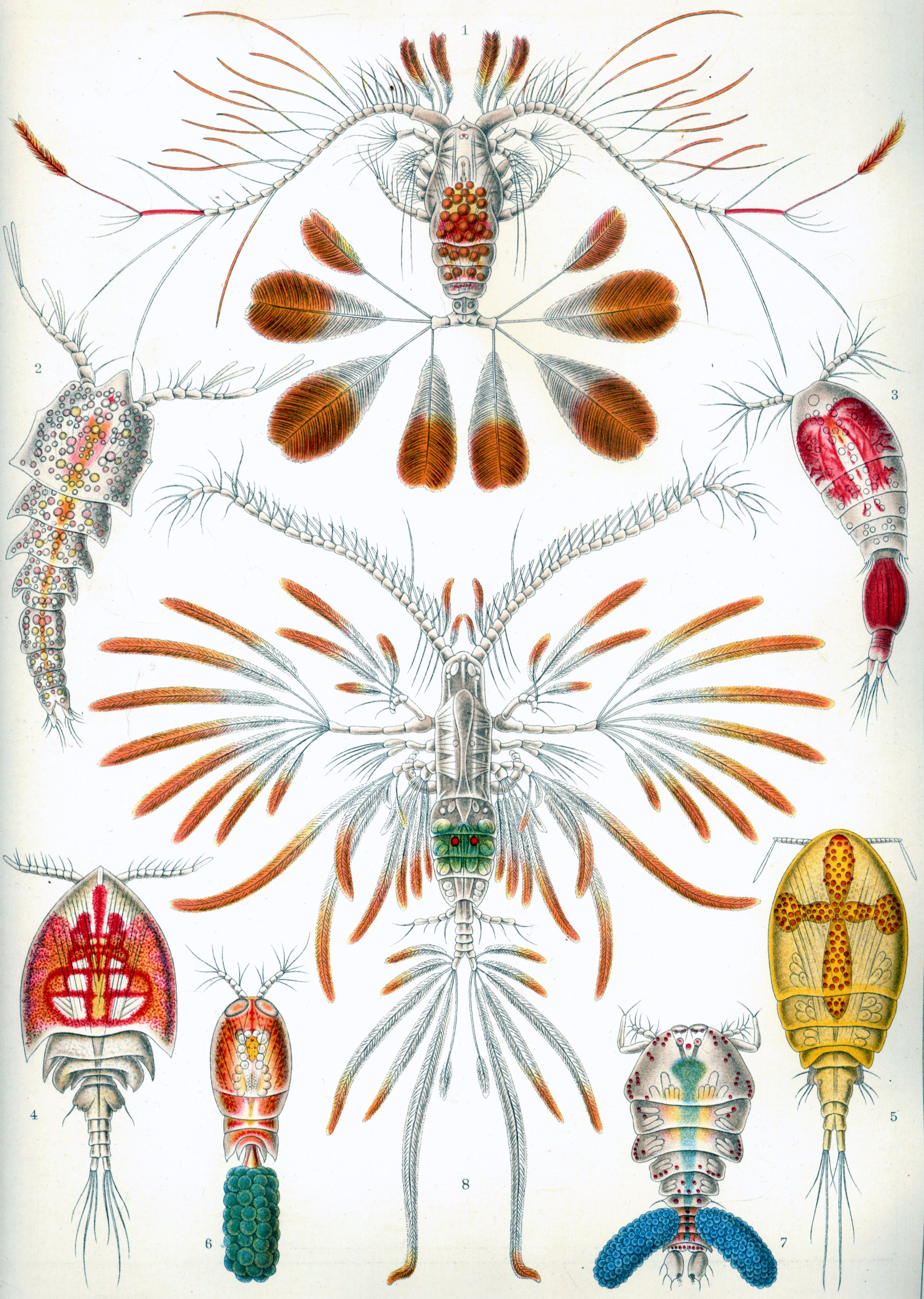
Copepod (Copepoda)

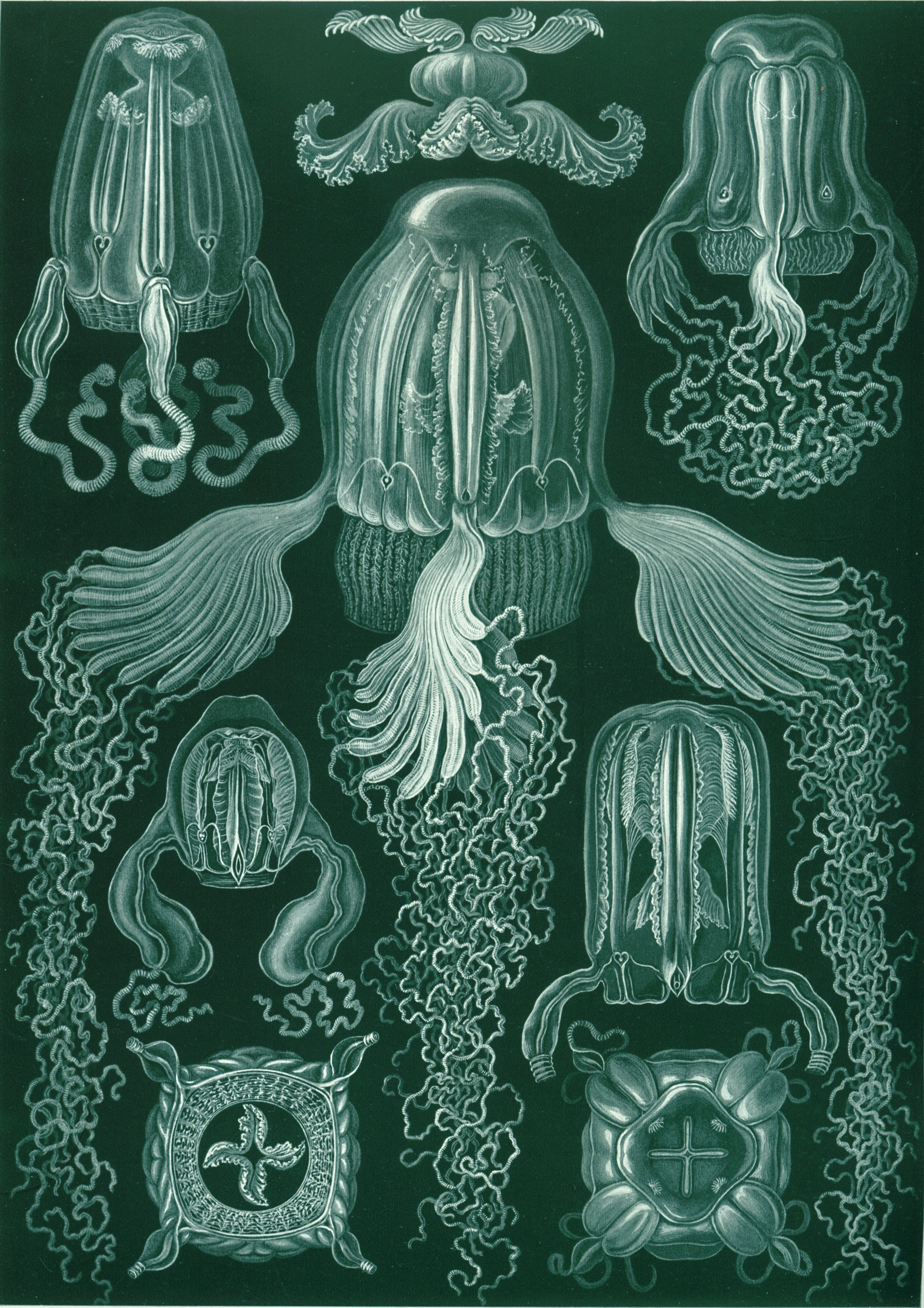
Box jellyfish (Cubomedusae)

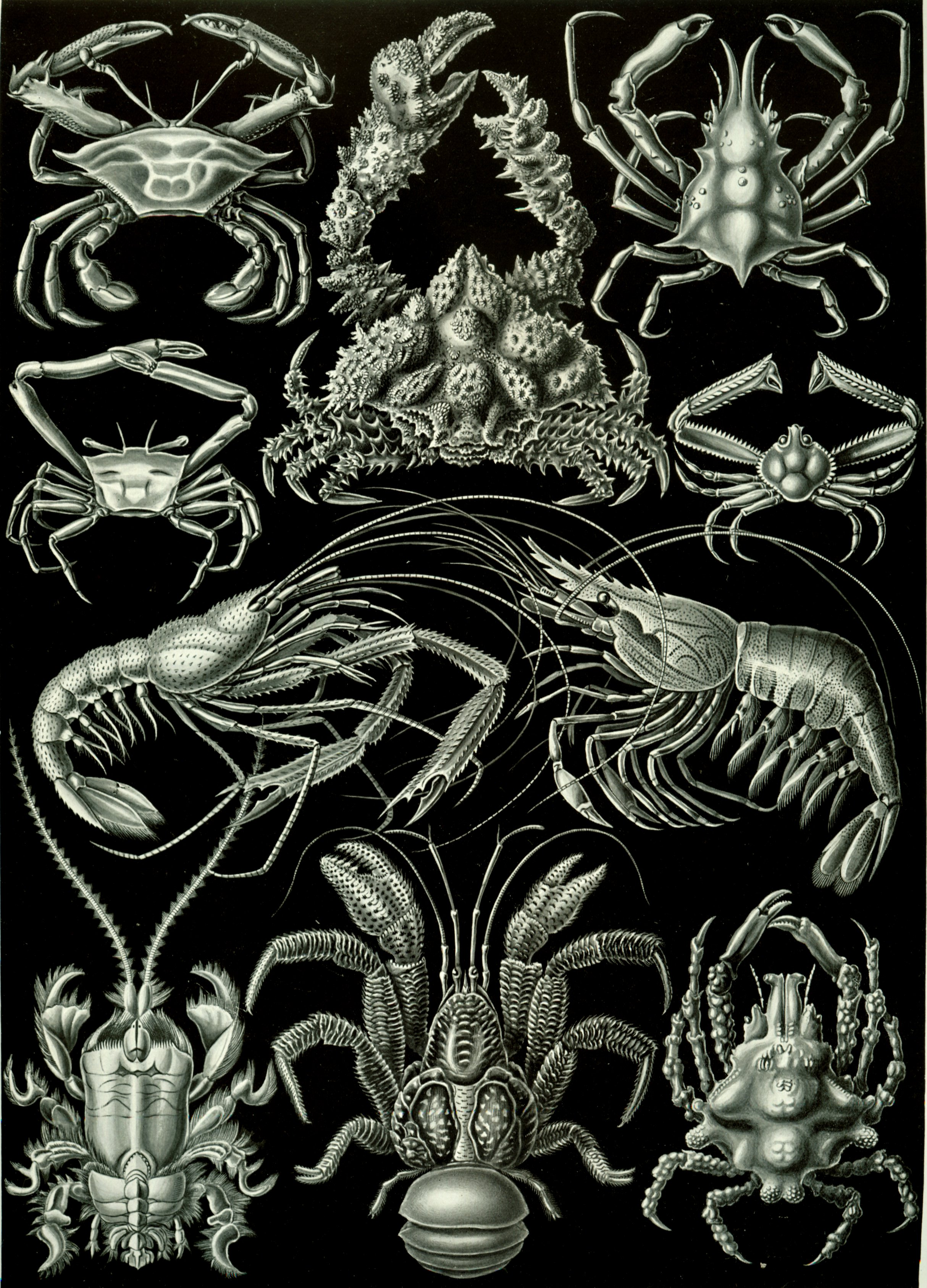
Decapods (Decapoda)

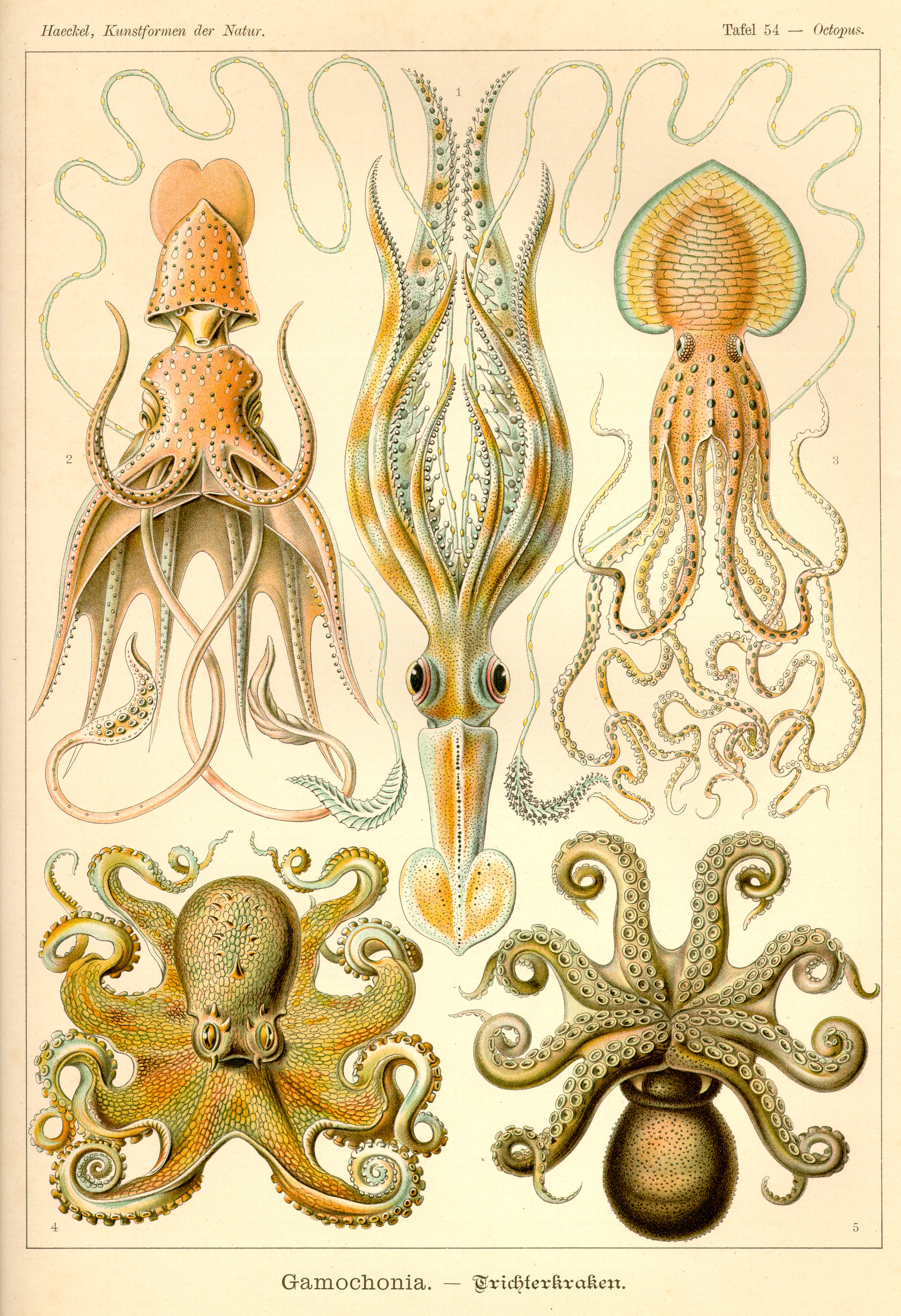
Cephalopod (Gamochonia)

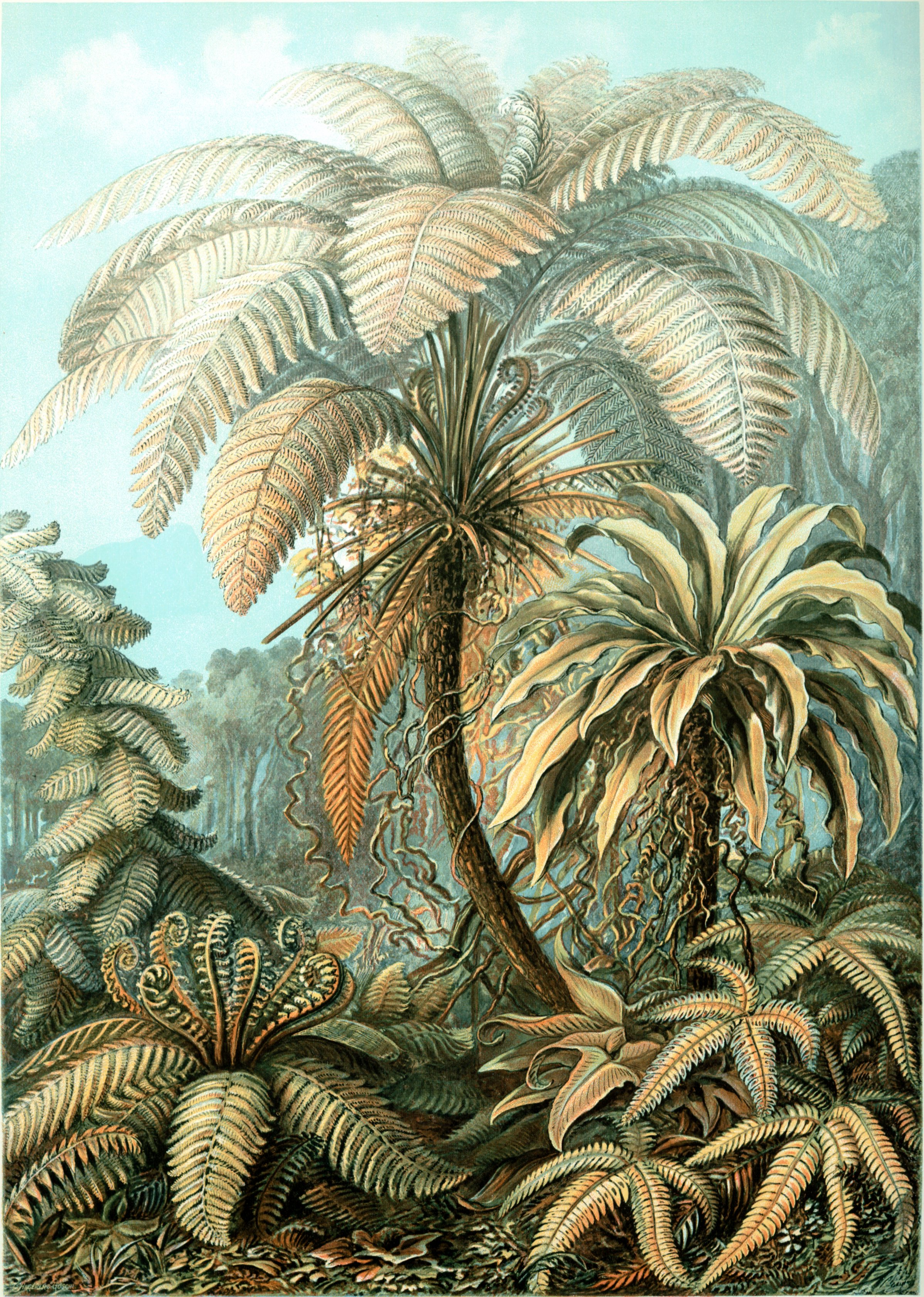
Fern (Filicinae)

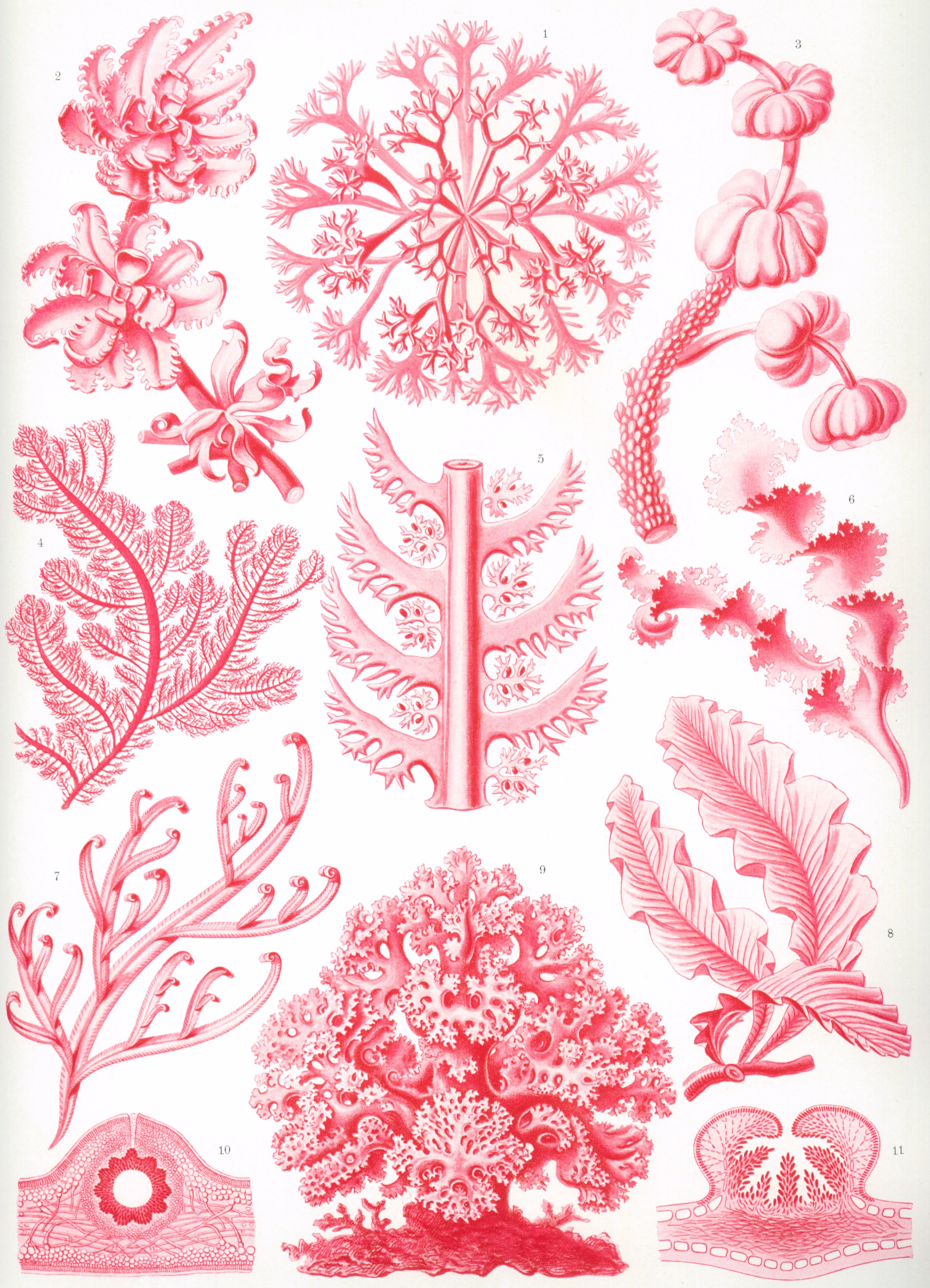
Red Algae (Florideae)

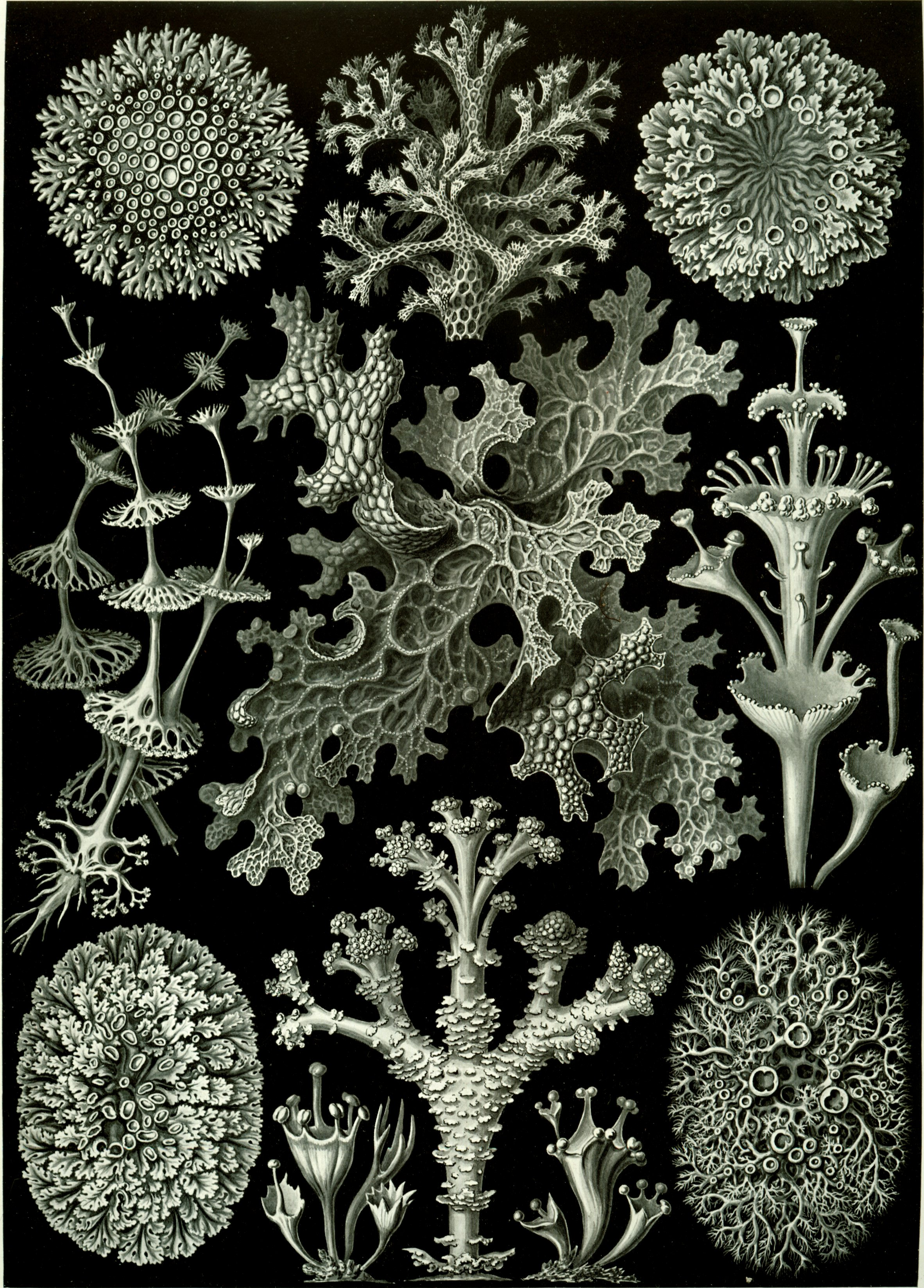
Lichen (Lichenes)

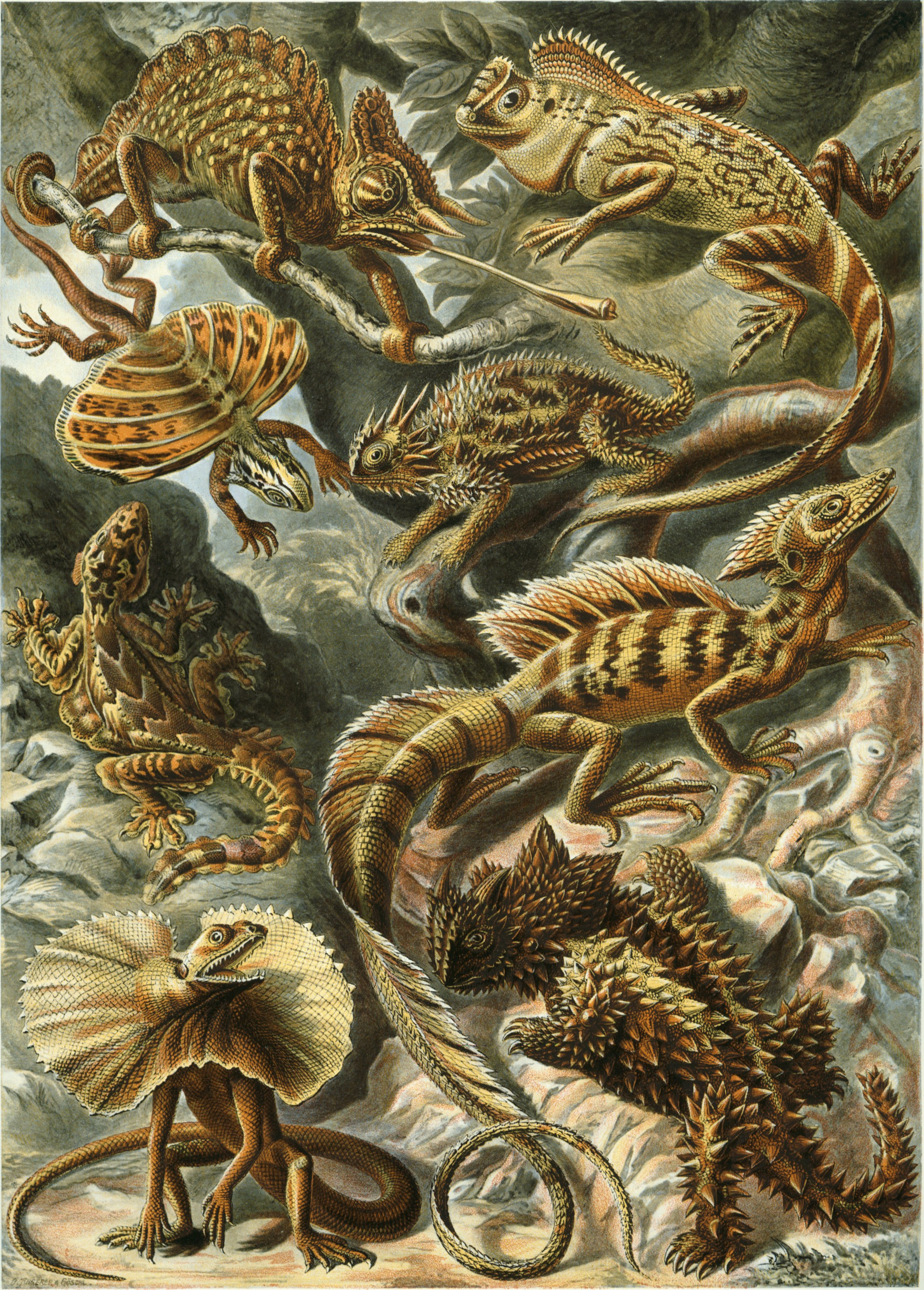
Lizard (Lacertilia)

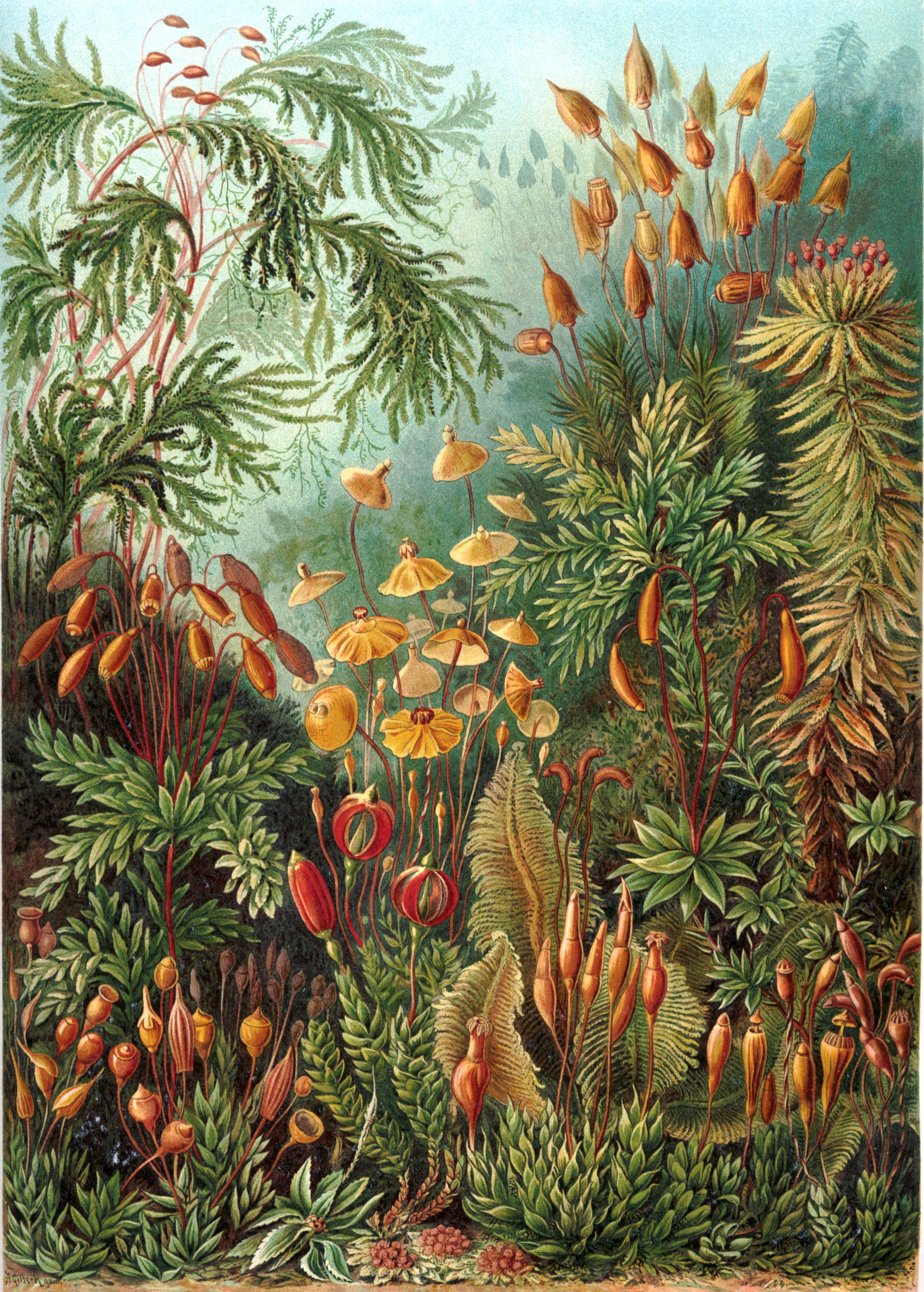
Moss (Muscinae)

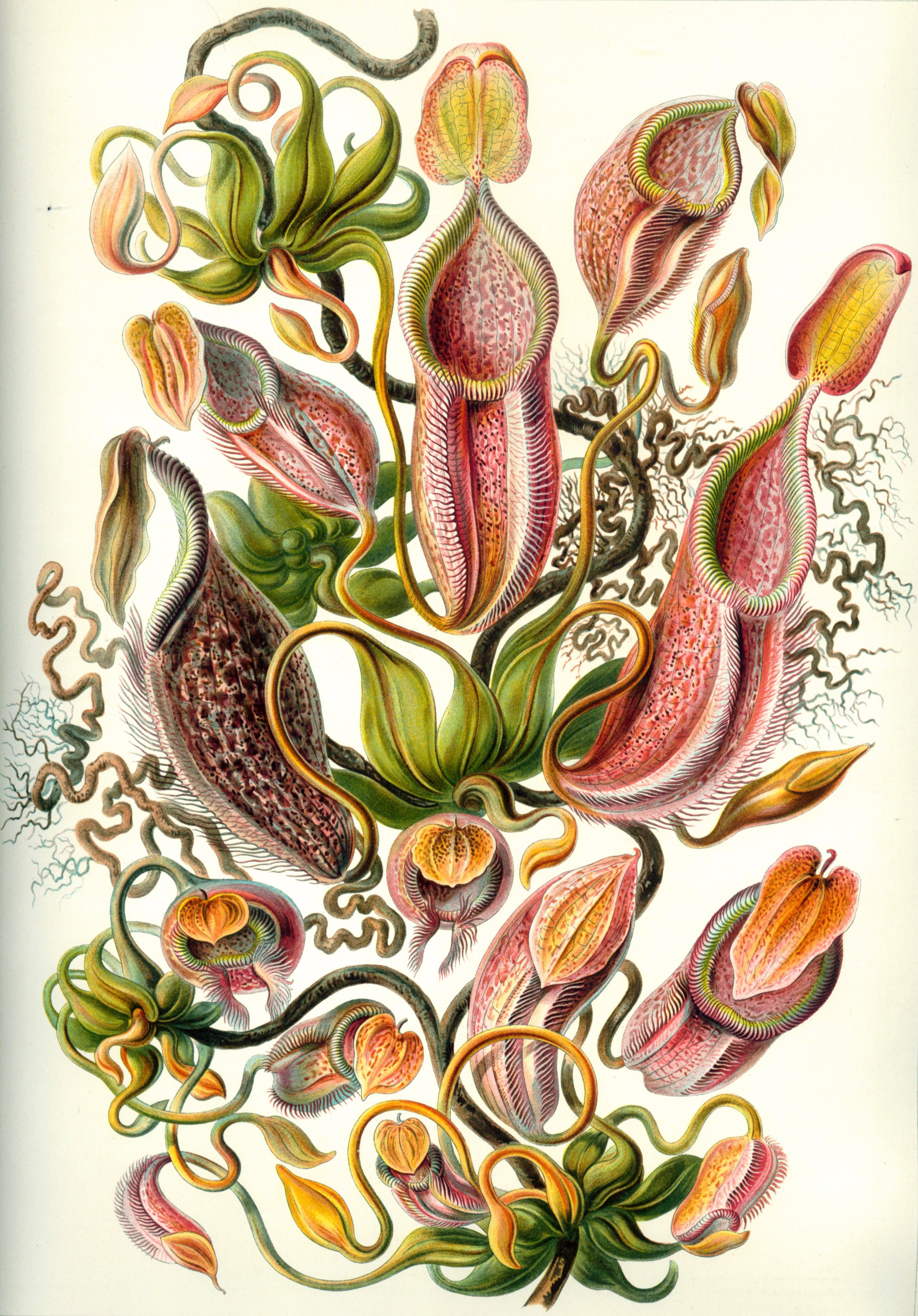
Nepenthes (Nepenthaceae)

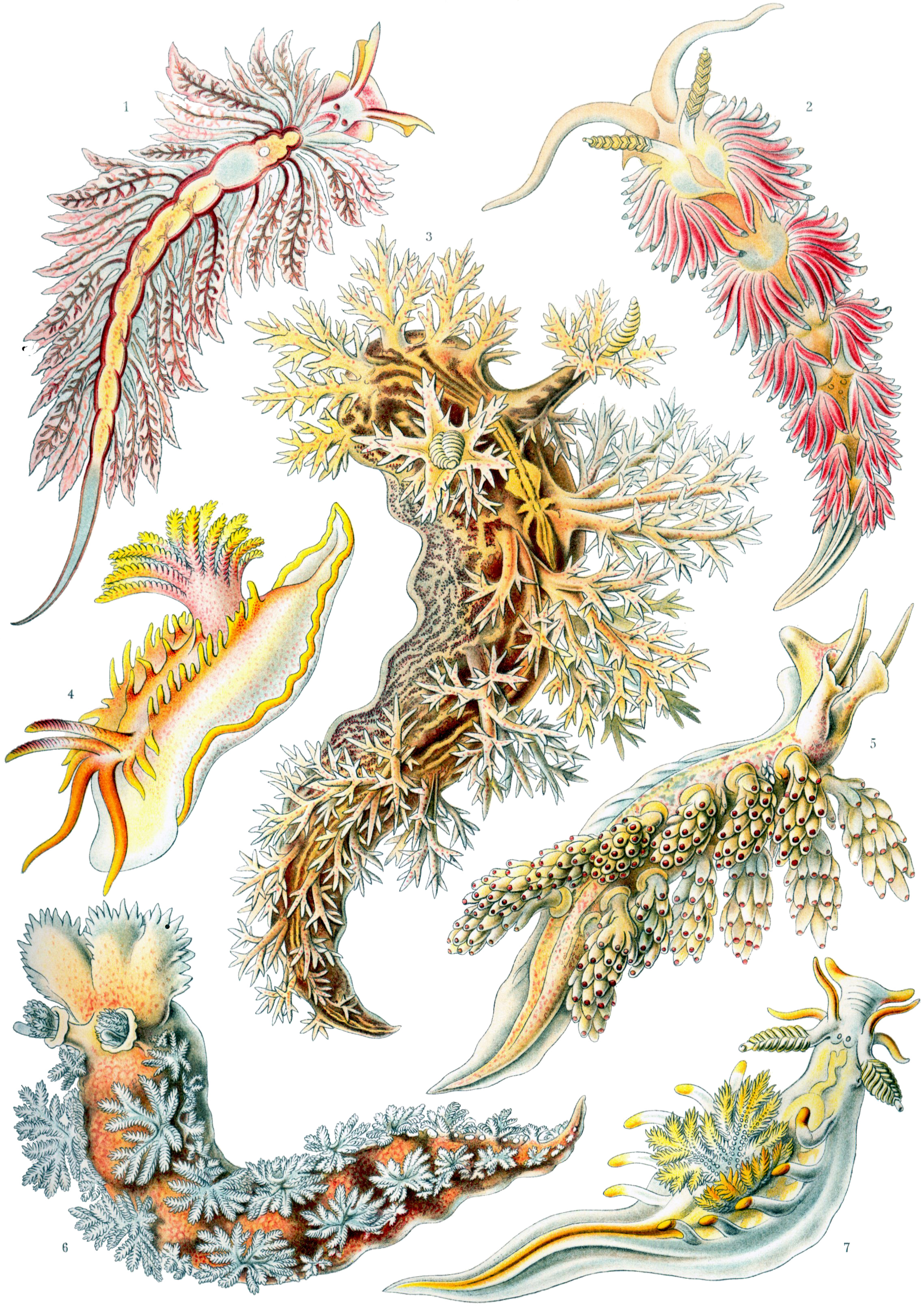
Nudibranch (Nudibranchia)

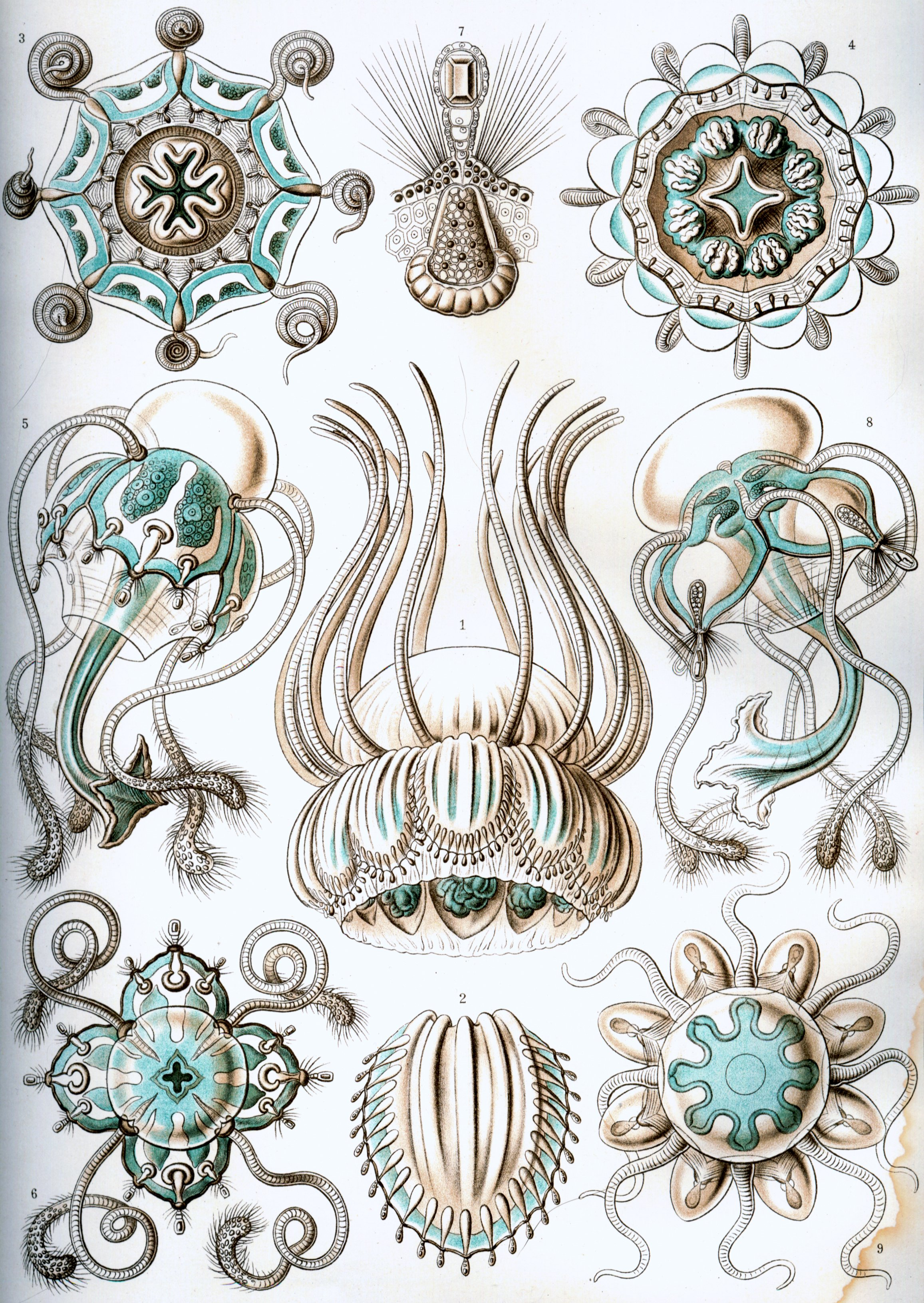
Trachylina (Narcomedusae)

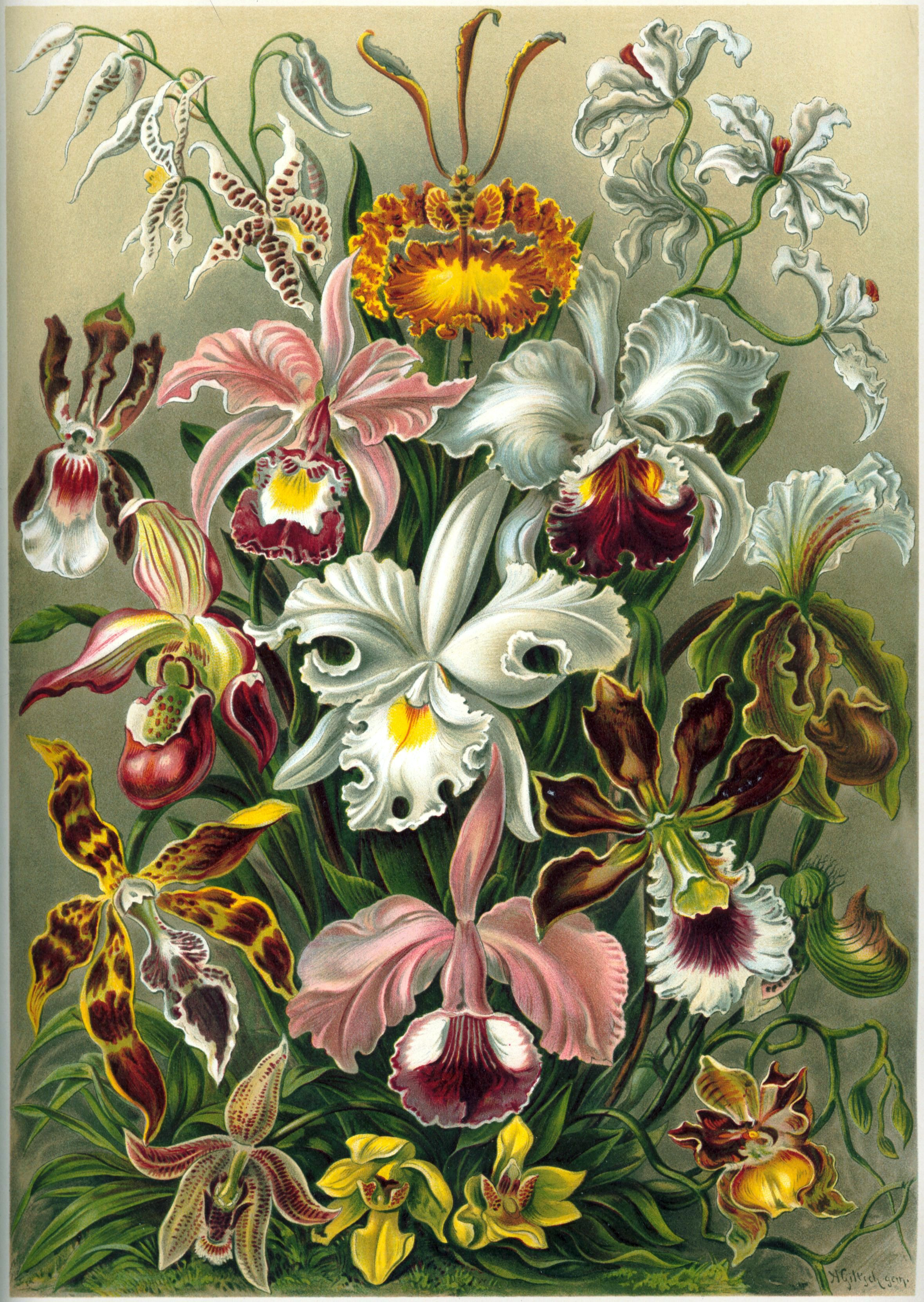
Orchid (Orchidae)

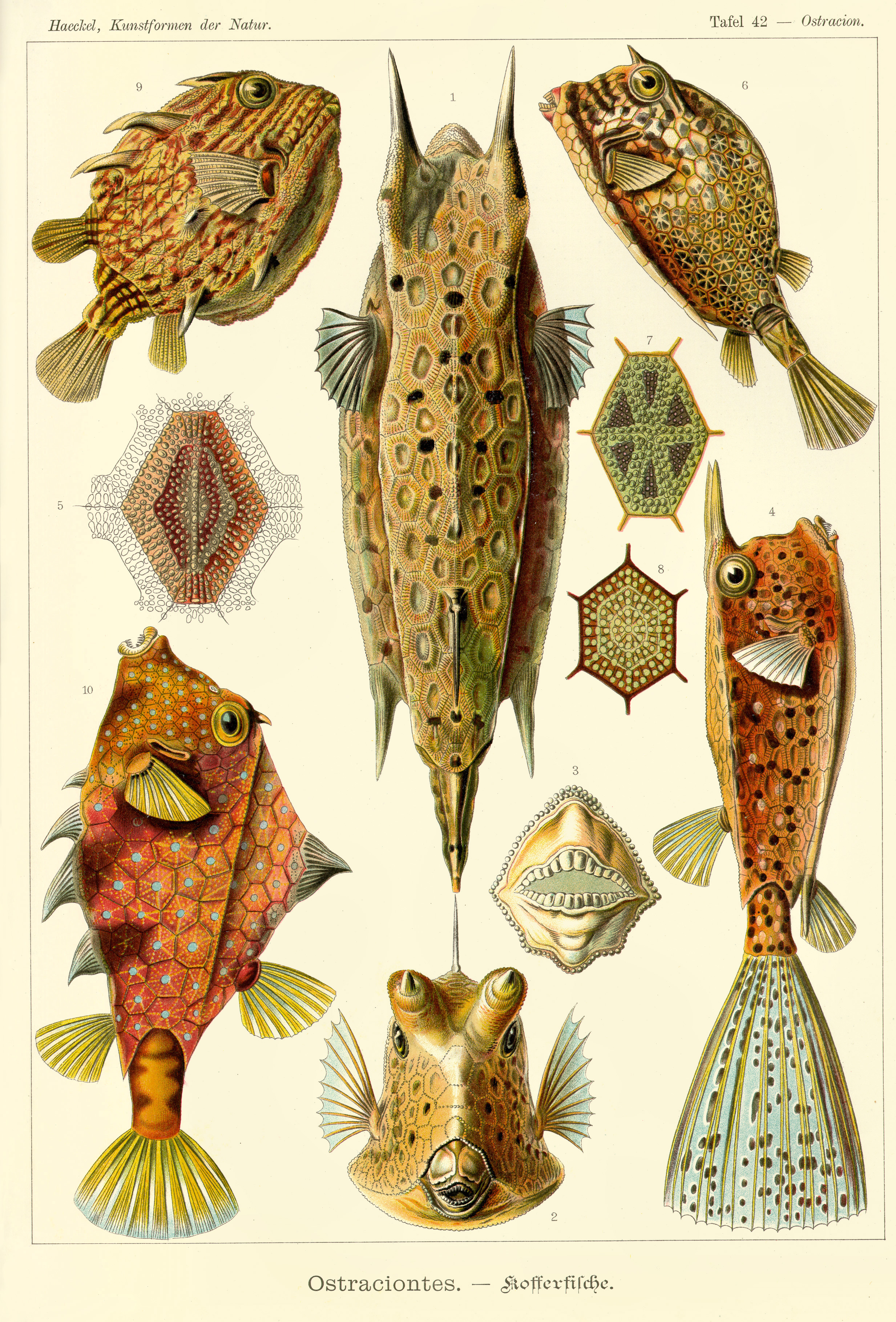
Boxfish (Ostraciontes)

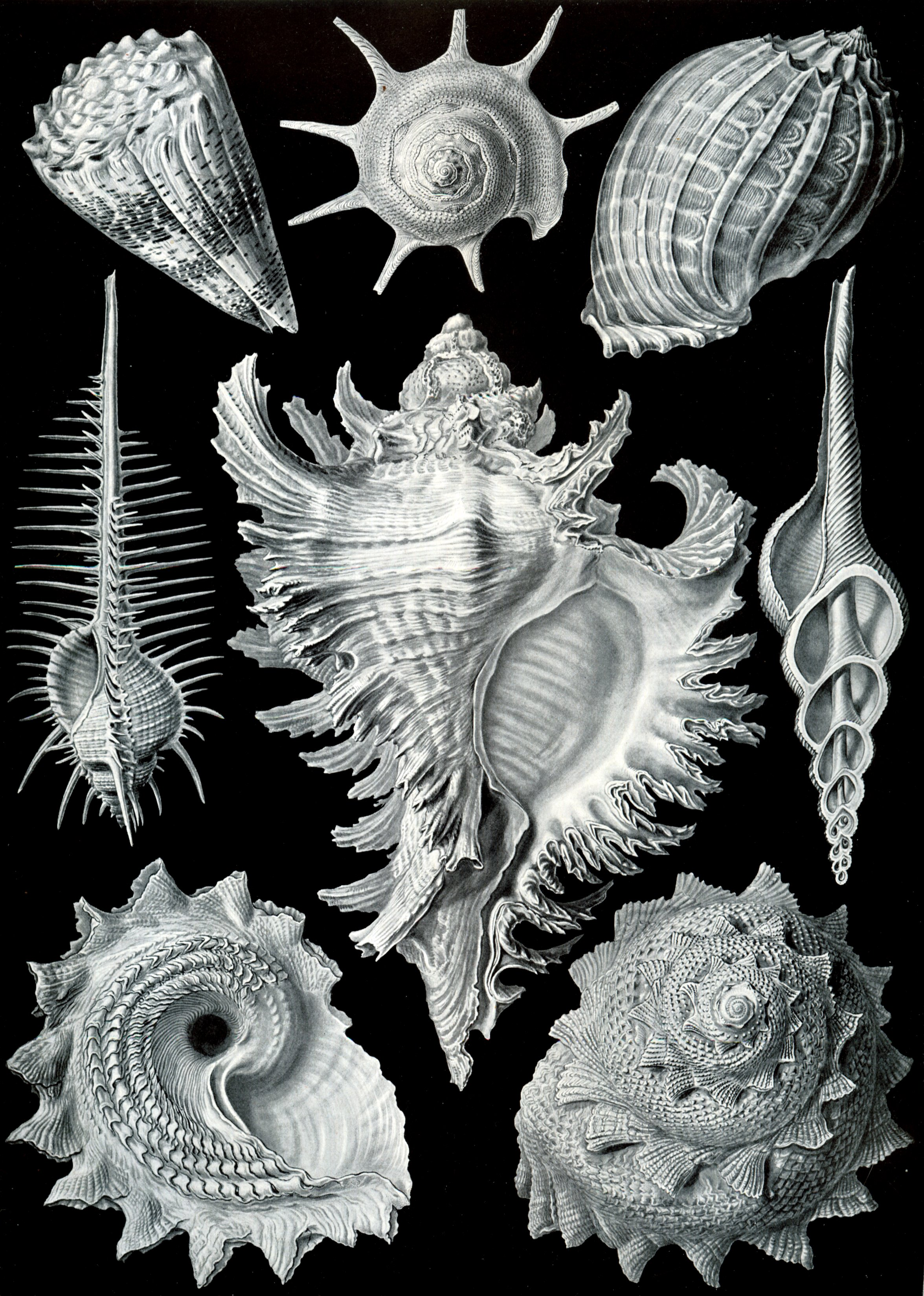
Prosobranchia (obsolete classification)

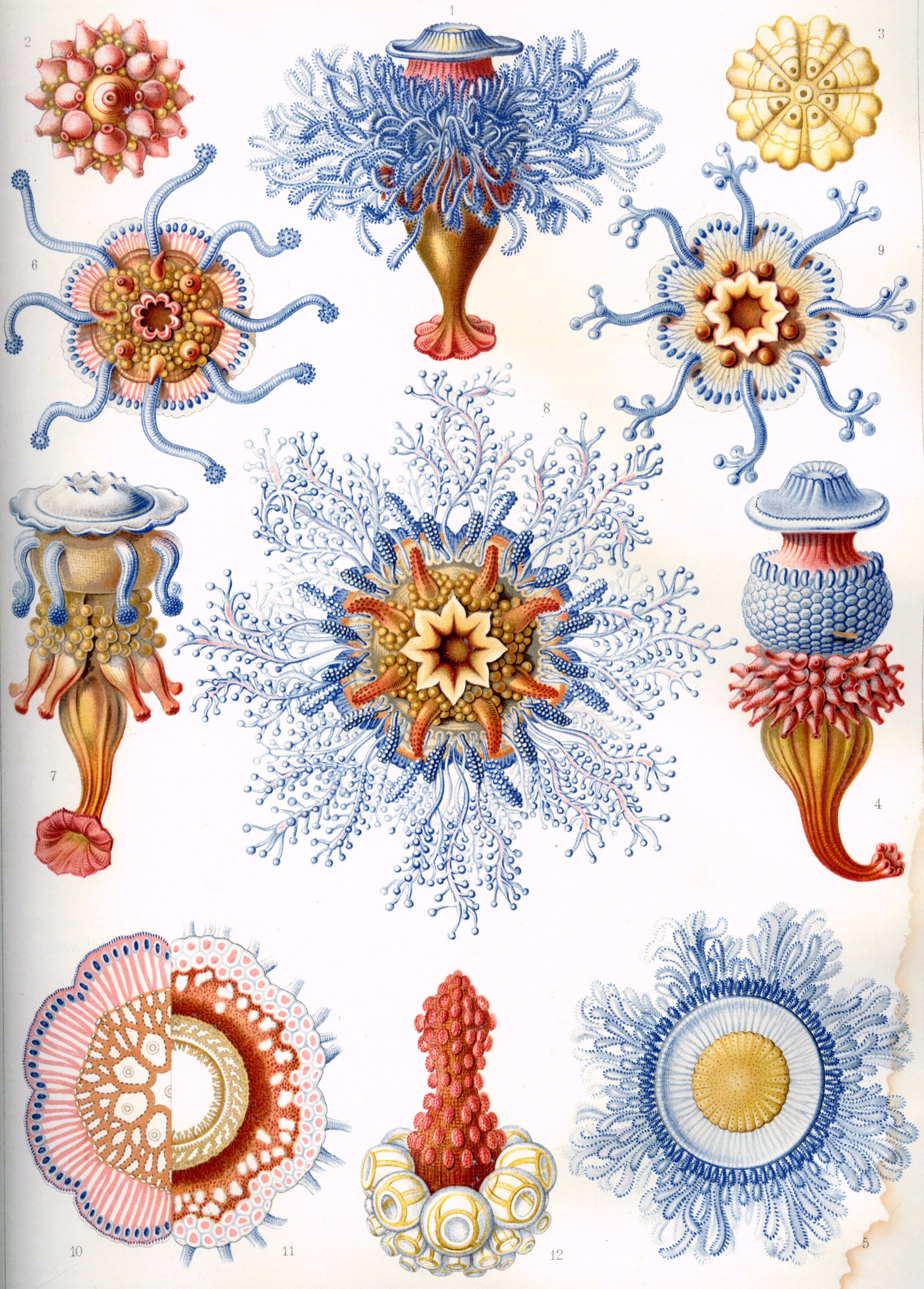
Siphonophorae

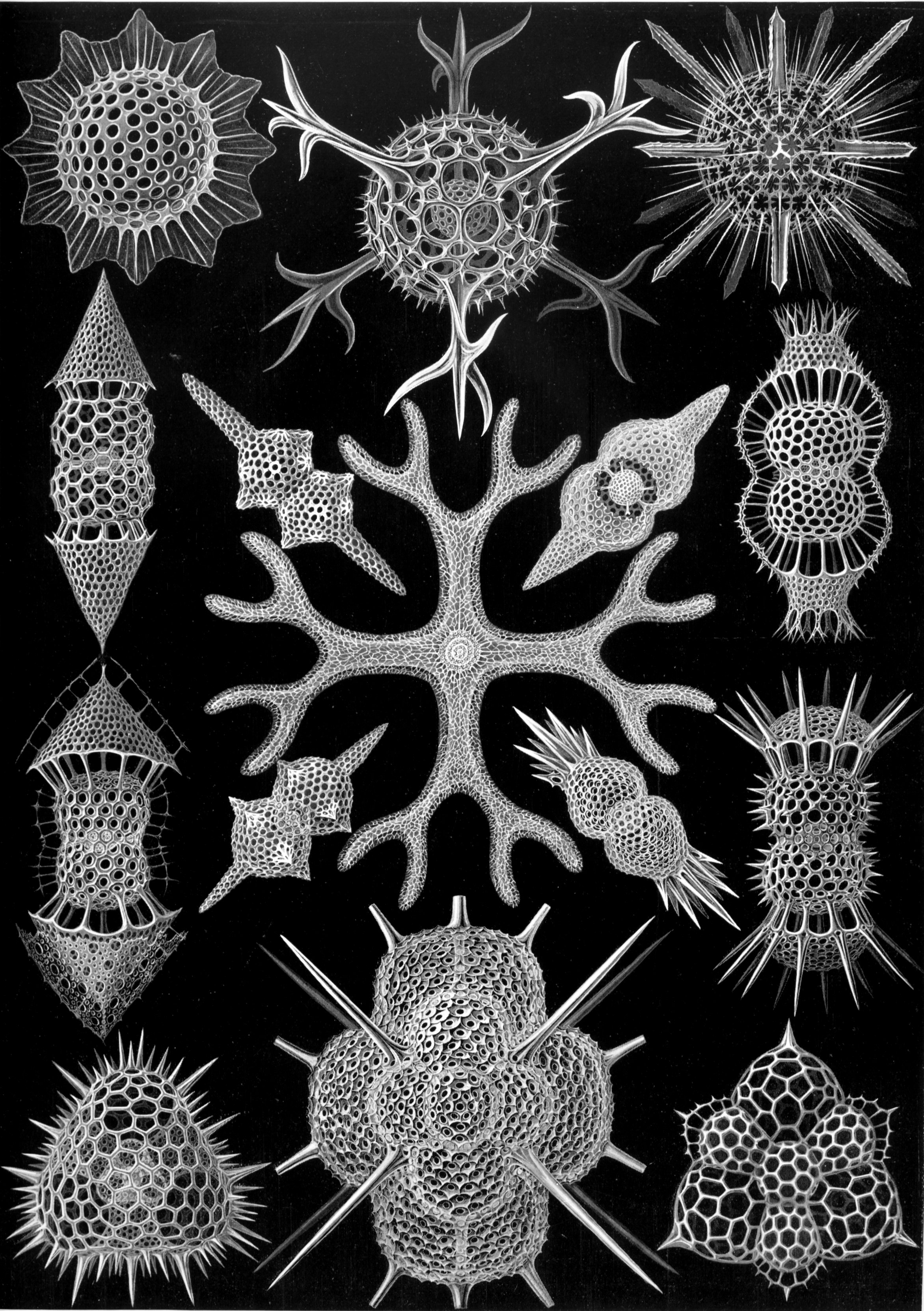
Polycystine (Spumellaria)

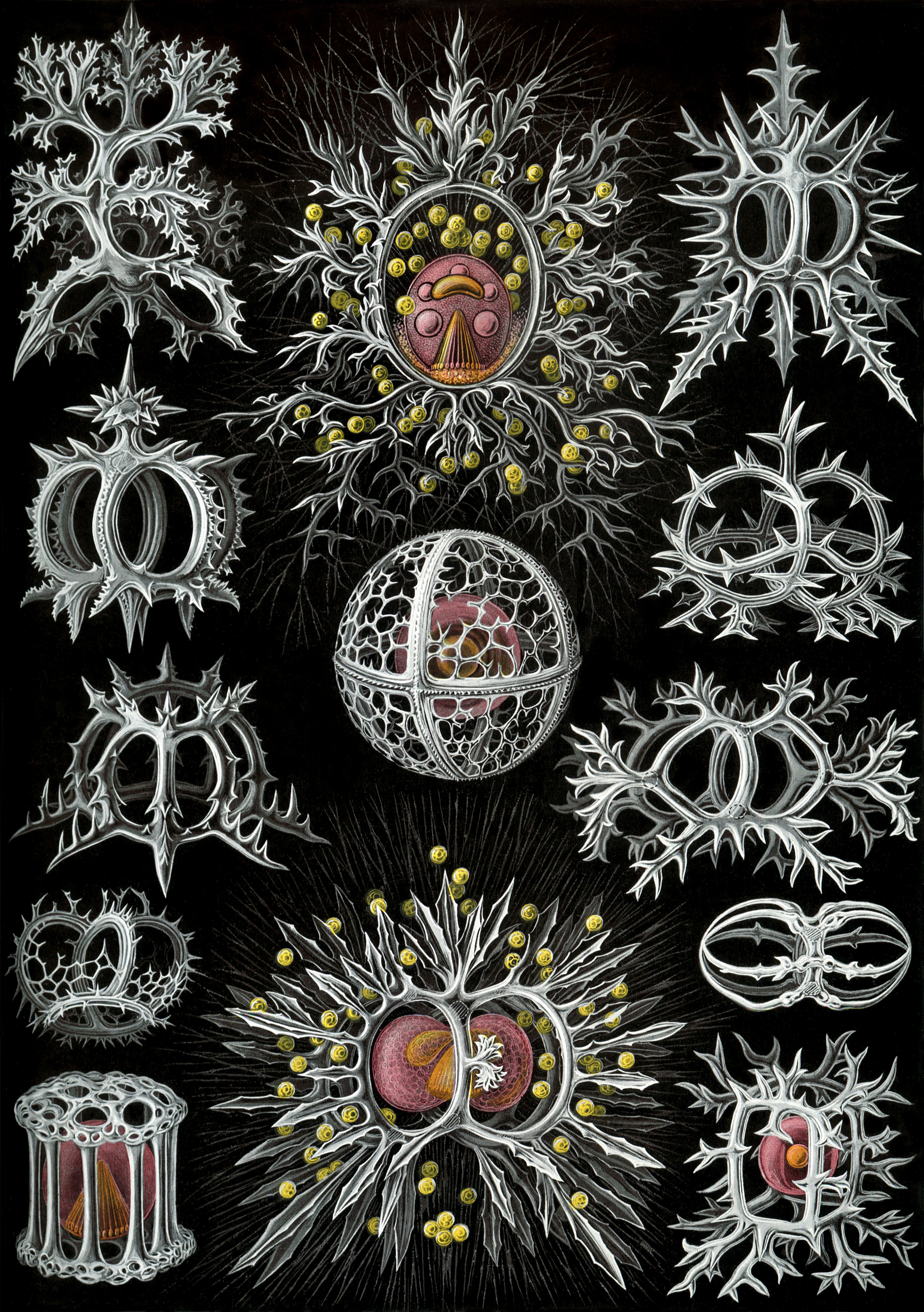
Radiolarian (Stephoidea)

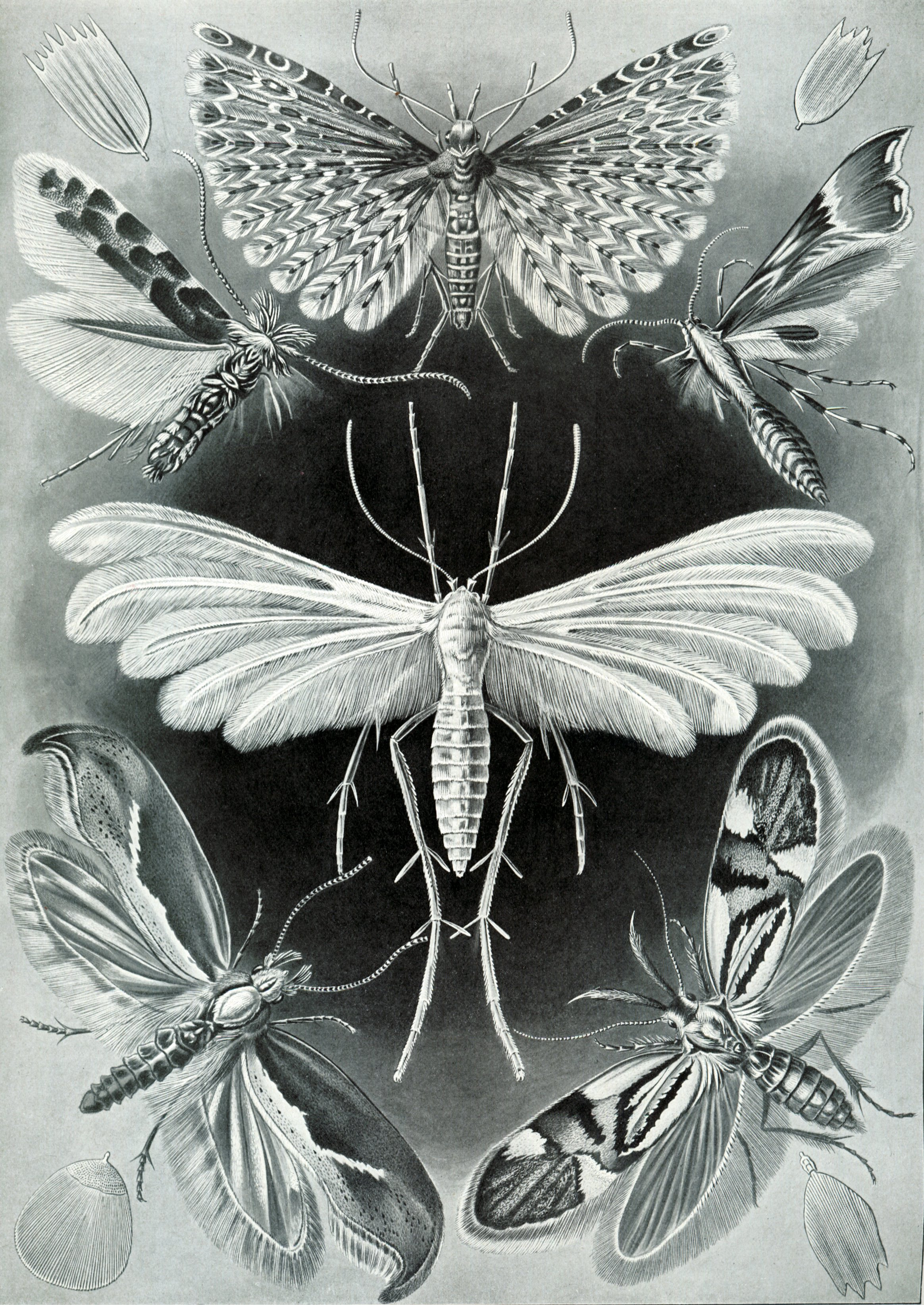
Moth (Tineida)

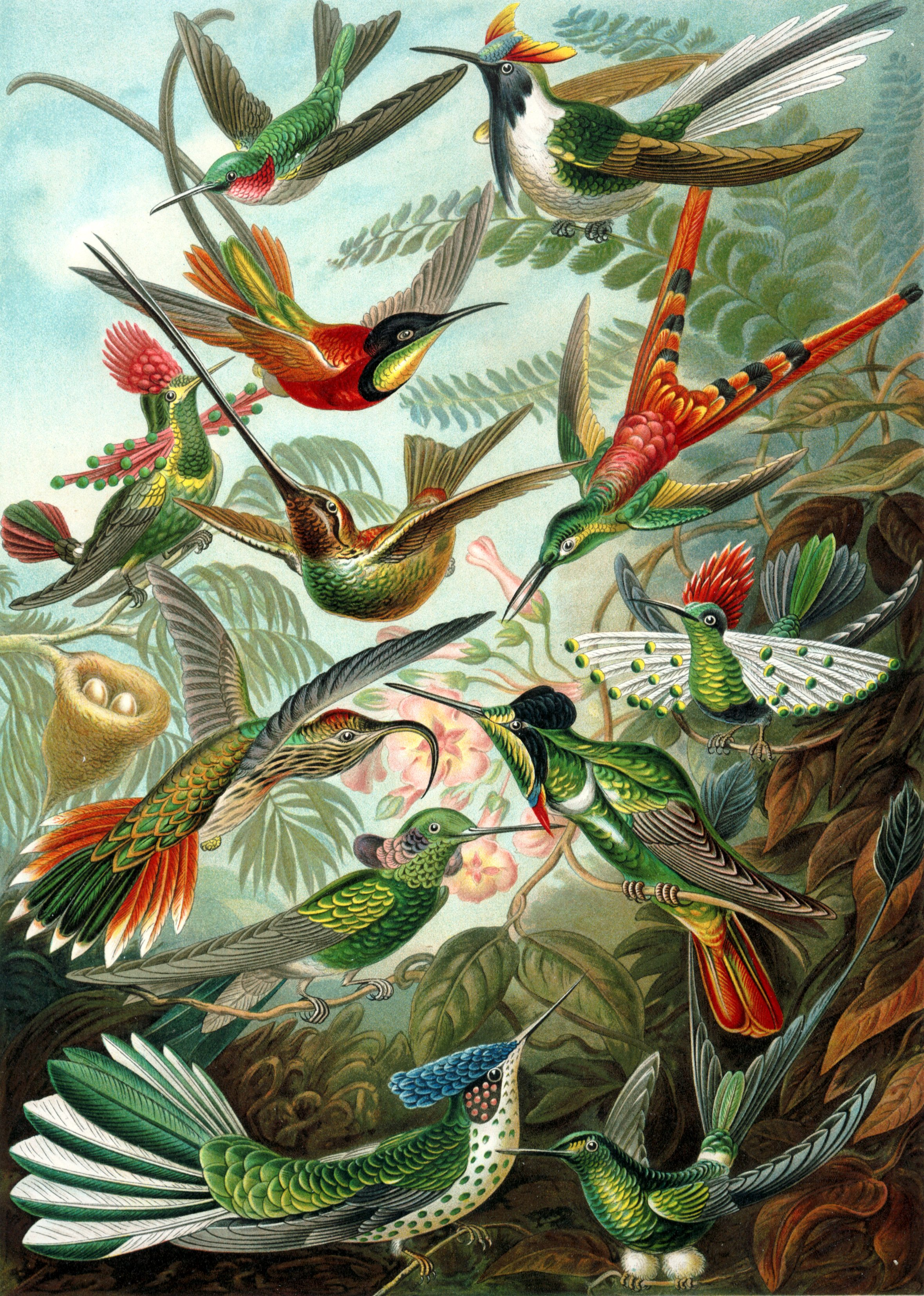
Hummingbird (Trochilidae)

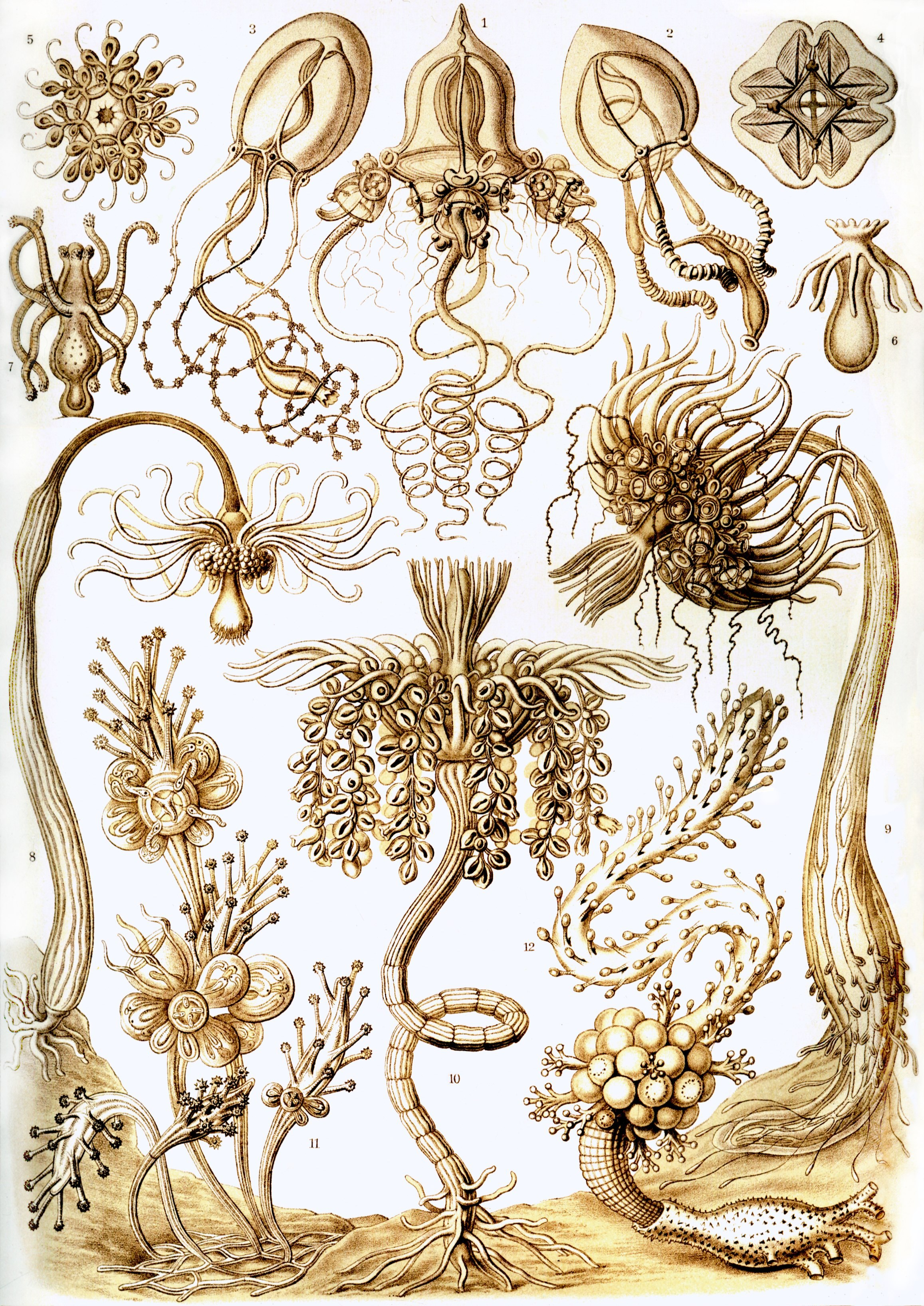
Tubularia (Tubulariae)

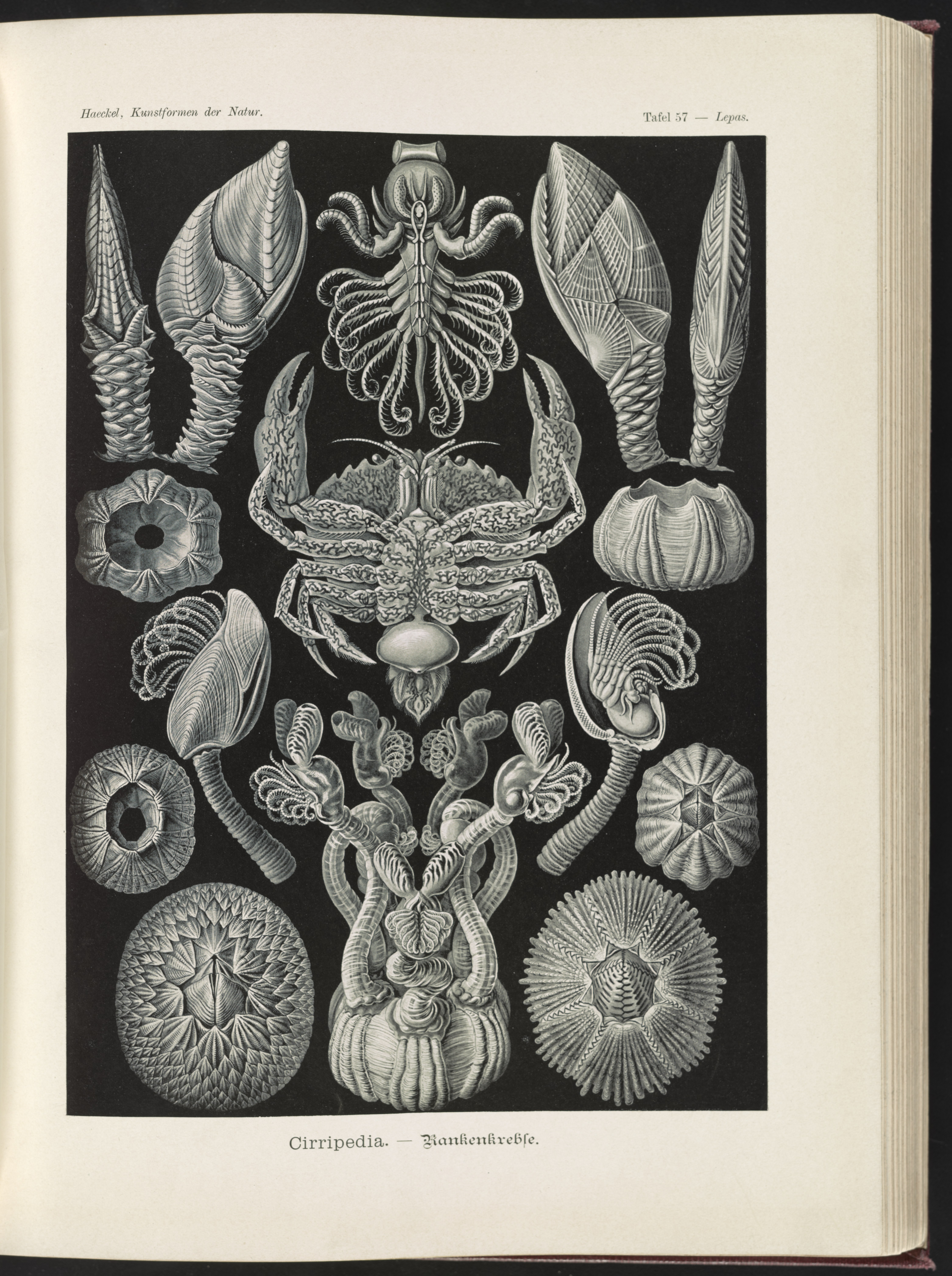

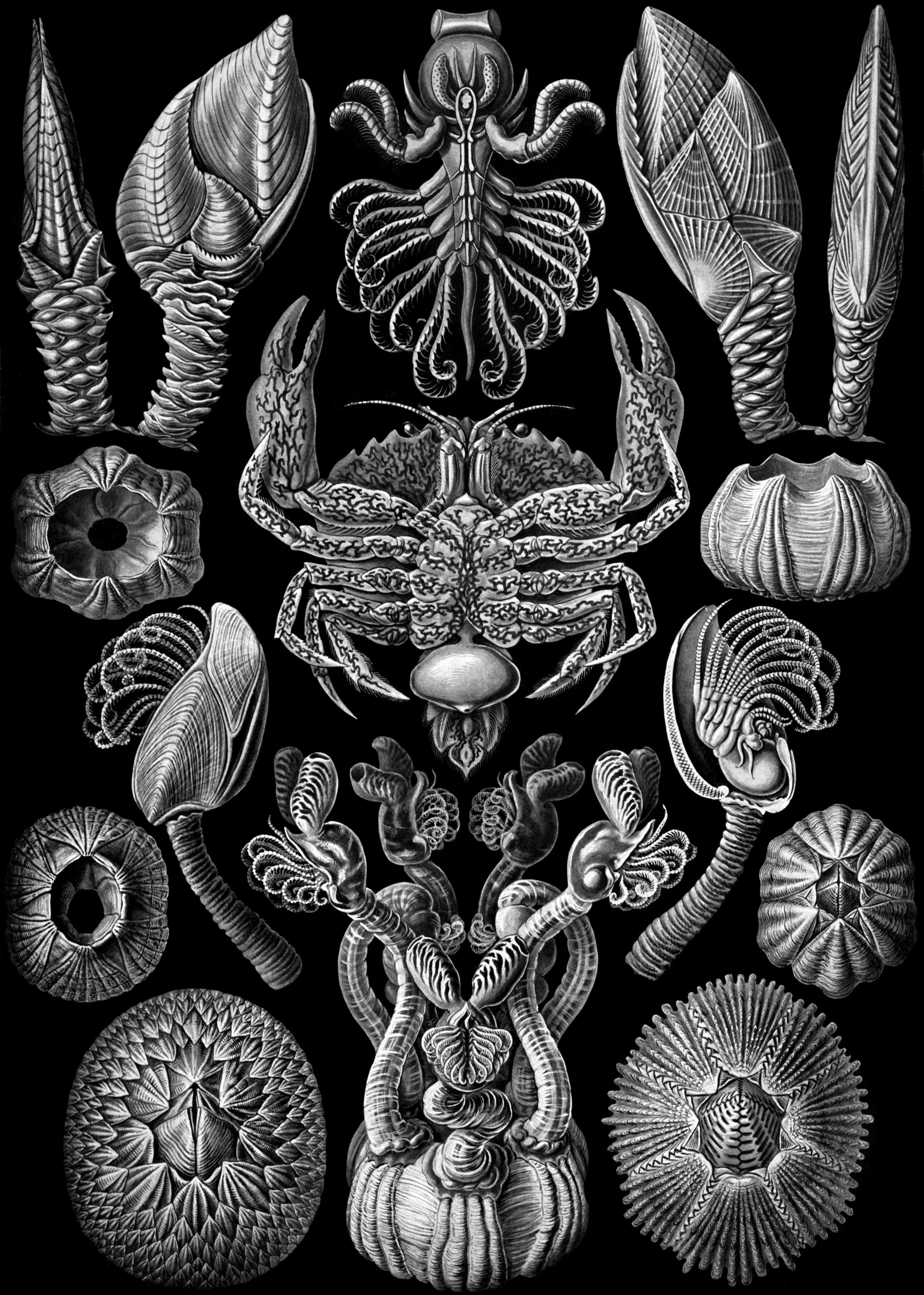
Cirripedia, Kunstformen der Natur, (1904).

== See also ==
- On Growth and Form
