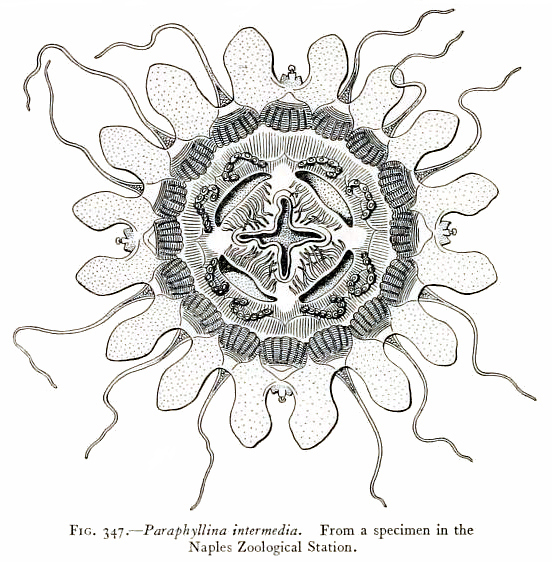

Scientific classification
- Kingdom: Animalia
- Phylum: Cnidaria
- Class: Scyphozoa
- Order: Coronatae
- Family: Paraphyllinidae
- Genus: Paraphyllina
- Species: P. intermedia

Binomial name
- Paraphyllina intermedia Maas, 1903

= Paraphyllina intermedia =

Species of jellyfish

Paraphyllina intermedia is a crown jellyfish in the family Paraphyllinidae. It is bioluminescent, and has a coronal groove of ~50 millimeters.
