= Nausithoe striata =

Scientific classification
- Kingdom: Animalia
- Phylum: Cnidaria
- Class: Scyphozoa
- Order: Coronatae
- Family: Nausithoidae
- Genus: Nausithoe
- Species: N. striata

Binomial name
- Nausithoe striata (Vanhöffen, 1910)

Synonyms
- Stephanoscyphus striatus Vanhöffen, 1910

Species of jellyfish

Nausithoe striata is a species of crown jellyfish in the family Nausithoidae. This species can be found in the Davis Sea.
