= Nausithoe hagenbeckii =

Scientific classification
- Kingdom: Animalia
- Phylum: Cnidaria
- Class: Scyphozoa
- Order: Coronatae
- Family: Nausithoidae
- Genus: Nausithoe
- Species: N. hagenbeckii

Binomial name
- Nausithoe hagenbeckii Jarms, 2001

Species of jellyfish

Nausithoe hagenbeckii is a species of crown jellyfish in the family Nausithoidae. Medusa of the species are estimated to be ~5 millimeters in diameter. Despite being a marine jellyfish, this species has yet to be found in the wild: the type specimen was collected from a tropical aquarium at Hagenbeck Zoo in Hamburg, Germany.
