= Atolla reynoldsi =

Scientific classification
- Kingdom: Animalia
- Phylum: Cnidaria
- Class: Scyphozoa
- Order: Coronatae
- Family: Atollidae
- Genus: Atolla
- Species: A. reynoldsi

Binomial name
- Atolla reynoldsi Matsumoto, Christianson, Robison, Haddock & Johnson, 2022

Species of jellyfish

Atolla reynoldsi is a species of true jellyfish in the family Atollidae. It is known from type specimens found in the north Pacific Ocean.

== Etymology ==
The genus name, Atolla, is derived from the word atoll. The specific epithet was given in honor of Jeff Reynolds, a volunteer at the Monterey Bay Aquarium who guarded a beached whale overnight at Del Monte beach. Unlike most Atolla, it lacks the long trailing tentacle that most Atolla have.
