= Stephanoscyphistoma =

Scientific classification
- Kingdom: Animalia
- Phylum: Cnidaria
- Class: Scyphozoa
- Order: Coronatae
- Family: incertae sedis
- Genus: Stephanoscyphistoma; Jarms, 1990

Species
- Stephanoscyphistoma allmani (Kirkpatrick, 1890); Stephanoscyphistoma bianconis (Thiel, 1936); Stephanoscyphistoma corniformis (Komai, 1936)

Synonyms
- Stephanoscyphus Allman, 1874

Genus of jellyfish

Stephanoscyphistoma is a genus of crown jellyfish. Its taxonomic placement has been disputed, having been placed in Hydrozoa and Scyphozoa, and additionally having contained former members that were discovered to produce medusae belonging to the genera Atorella and Nausithoe.

== Etymology ==
The genus name is derived from the Ancient Greek stéphanos ("crown"), skúphos ("cup"), and stóma ("mouth"). This was given in reference to the cup-like shape of the species' bodies, and its crown of marginal tentacles.

== Species ==
According to the World Register of Marine Species, Stephanoscyphistoma contains three species:

- Stephanoscyphistoma allmani (Kirkpatrick, 1890)
- Stephanoscyphistoma bianconis (Thiel, 1936)
- Stephanoscyphistoma corniformis (Komai, 1936)
