= Nausithoe sorbei =

Scientific classification
- Kingdom: Animalia
- Phylum: Cnidaria
- Class: Scyphozoa
- Order: Coronatae
- Family: Nausithoidae
- Genus: Nausithoe
- Species: N. sorbei

Binomial name
- Nausithoe sorbei Jarms, Tiemann & Prados, 2003

Species of jellyfish

Nausithoe sorbei is a species of crown jellyfish belonging to the Nausithoidae family. Ephyrae of the species are believed to be 4.7–5.0 millimeters in diameter.
