= Atolla vanhoeffeni =

Scientific classification
- Domain: Eukaryota
- Kingdom: Animalia
- Phylum: Cnidaria
- Class: Scyphozoa
- Order: Coronatae
- Family: Atollidae
- Genus: Atolla
- Species: A. vanhoeffeni

Binomial name
- Atolla vanhoeffeni Russell, 1957

Species of jellyfish

Atolla vanhoeffeni is a species of true jellyfish in the family Atollidae.

== Etymology ==
The genus name, Atolla, is derived from the word atoll. The specific epithet was given in honor of Ernst Vanhöffen.
