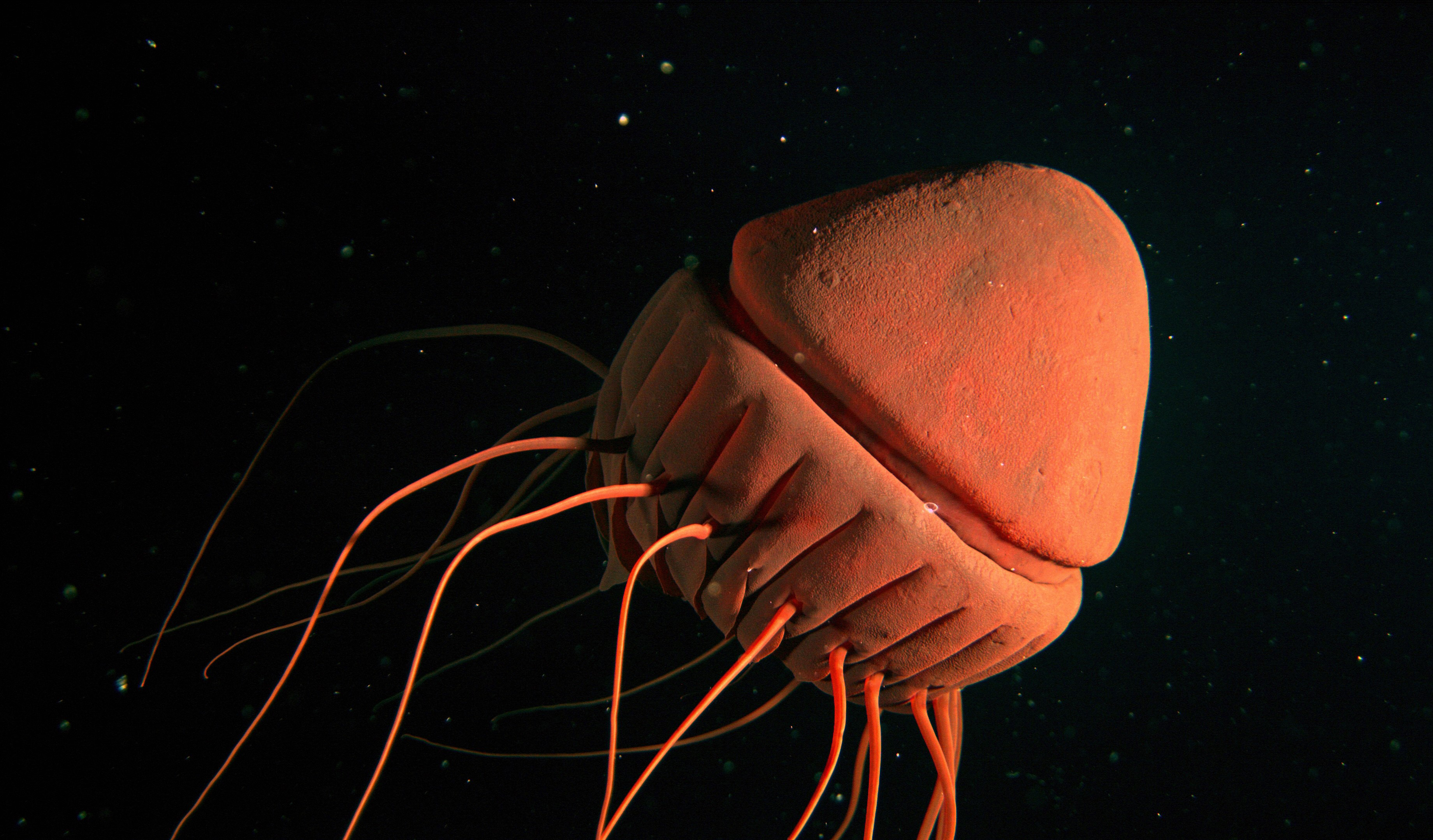
- Periphyllopsis braueri

Scientific classification
- Kingdom: Animalia
- Phylum: Cnidaria
- Class: Scyphozoa
- Order: Coronatae
- Family: Periphyllidae
- Genus: Periphyllopsis; Vanhöffen, 1902

Type species
- Periphyllopsis braueri Vanhöffen, 1902

Species
- Periphyllopsis braueri Vanhöffen, 1902; Periphyllopsis galatheae Kramp, 1959

Synonyms
- Stephanoscyphus Allman, 1874

= Periphyllopsis =

Genus of jellyfish

Periphyllopsis is a genus of deep-sea crown jellyfish in the family Periphyllidae.

== Species ==
According to the World Register of Marine Species, Periphyllopsis contains two accepted species:

- Periphyllopsis braueri Vanhöffen, 1902
- Periphyllopsis galatheae Kramp, 1959
