= Nausithoe marginata =

Scientific classification
- Kingdom: Animalia
- Phylum: Cnidaria
- Class: Scyphozoa
- Order: Coronatae
- Family: Nausithoidae
- Genus: Nausithoe
- Species: N. marginata

Binomial name
- Nausithoe marginata Kölliker, 1853

Species of jellyfish

Nausithoe marginata is a species of crown jellyfish in the family Nausithoidae. The species has only been observed a handful of times, and may be extinct.
