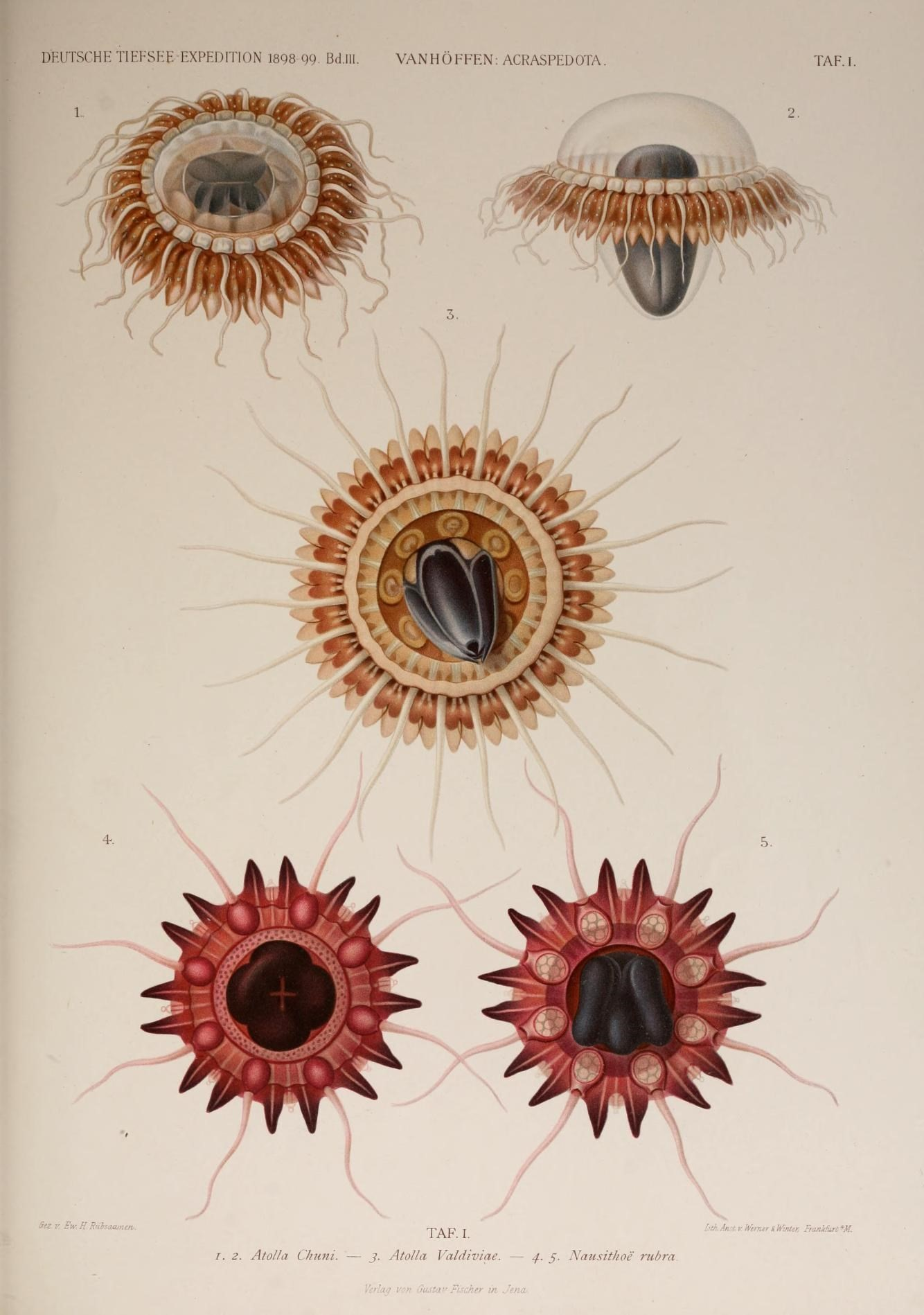
- Atolla chuni Top 1-2.

Scientific classification
- Domain: Eukaryota
- Kingdom: Animalia
- Phylum: Cnidaria
- Class: Scyphozoa
- Order: Coronatae
- Family: Atollidae
- Genus: Atolla
- Species: A. chuni

Binomial name
- Atolla chuni Vanhöffen, 1902

= Atolla chuni =

Species of jellyfish

Atolla chuni is a species of crown jellyfish within the family Atollidae. The species is found distributed in the Southern Ocean and some parts of the southern Pacific and Atlantic Ocean in pelagic environments at depths of up to 5198 meters. Individuals have been found with partially digesting remains of large Calanoida copepods, chaetognaths, Hyperiidea amphipods, and krill attached to the gastric cirri. It grows to a length of 7 centimeters.
