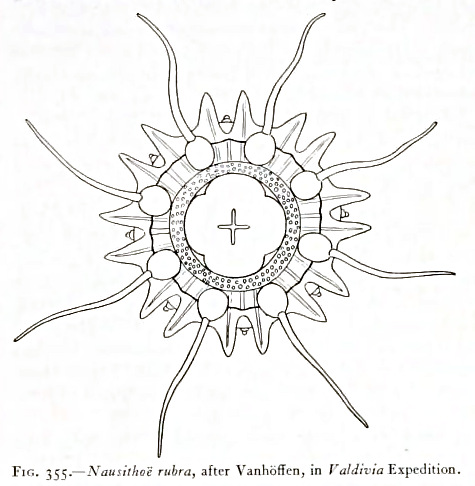

Scientific classification
- Kingdom: Animalia
- Phylum: Cnidaria
- Class: Scyphozoa
- Order: Coronatae
- Family: Nausithoidae
- Genus: Nausithoe
- Species: N. rubra

Binomial name
- Nausithoe rubra Vanhöffen, 1902

= Nausithoe rubra =

Species of jellyfish

Nausithoe rubra is a species of crown jellyfish in the family Nausithoidae. Adult medusa are believed to grow up to ~15 millimeters in size, and the species may be distributed worldwide. Species is confirmed to be in the East Atlantic, but may also reside in other oceans.
