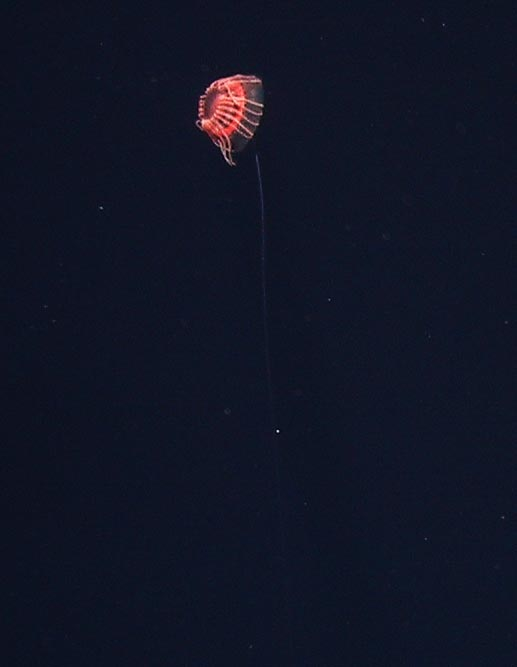

Scientific classification
- Kingdom: Animalia
- Phylum: Cnidaria
- Class: Scyphozoa
- Order: Coronatae
- Family: Atollidae
- Genus: Atolla
- Species: A. tenella

Binomial name
- Atolla tenella Hartlaub, 1909

= Atolla tenella =

Species of jellyfish

Atolla tenella is a species of jellyfish in the family Atollidae which lives in the Arctic Ocean. Its main characteristic is the long trailing tentacle that is way longer than the others.
