= Atorella arcturi =

Scientific classification
- Domain: Eukaryota
- Kingdom: Animalia
- Phylum: Cnidaria
- Class: Scyphozoa
- Order: Coronatae
- Family: Atorellidae
- Genus: Atorella
- Species: A. arcturi

Binomial name
- Atorella arcturi Bigelow, 1928

Species of jellyfish

Atorella arcturi is a species of crown jellyfish in the family Atorellidae.

== Etymology ==
It was named in honor of the Arcturus Oceanographic Expedition, on which the type specimen was found.
