= Atorella octogonos =

Scientific classification
- Domain: Eukaryota
- Kingdom: Animalia
- Phylum: Cnidaria
- Class: Scyphozoa
- Order: Coronatae
- Family: Atorellidae
- Genus: Atorella
- Species: A. octogonos

Binomial name
- Atorella octogonos Mills, Larson & Youngbluth, 1987

Synonyms
- Atorella octogonus Mills, Larson & Young, 1987

Species of jellyfish

Atorella octogonos is a species of crown jellyfish in the family Atorellidae. It has been found in the Bahamas.

== Etymology ==
The specific epithet is derived from the Ancient Greek words októ ("eight") and gónos ("reproductive organ"), in reference to the eight gonads of the species.

== Description ==
The holotype of the species was described as having a bell 20 millimetres (0.79 in) in diameter and 14 millimetres (0.55 in) in height. The mesoglea is sub-spherical in shape. The outer bell has several nematocyst warts, each around 0.1 millimetres (0.0039 in) in diameter. It has six rhopalia between its lappets, of which there are 12. The lappets are rounded and broad. It has six tentacles, each of which end in a head of nematocysts. The mouth is short and circular. The stomach has four groups of gastric cirri, each of which arise from a gelatinous stalk having 20-30 gastric filaments. It has eight spindle-shaped gonads, which are a cream-tan color; the species is otherwise transparent and colorless.
