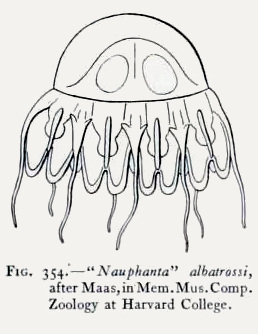

Scientific classification
- Kingdom: Animalia
- Phylum: Cnidaria
- Class: Scyphozoa
- Order: Coronatae
- Family: Nausithoidae
- Genus: Nausithoe
- Species: N. albatrossi

Binomial name
- Nausithoe albatrossi (Maas, 1897)

Synonyms
- Nauphanta albatrossi Maas, 1897

= Nausithoe albatrossi =

Species of jellyfish

Nausithoe albatrossi is a species of crown jellyfish in the family Nausithoidae. It was first described in 1897 as Nauphanta albatrossi by Otto Maas.

It is found in the eastern Pacific Ocean.

== Etymology ==
The specific epithet was given to commemorate the USS Albatross; the type specimens were found on an exploratory expeditiom by the ship.

== Description ==
Nausithroe albatrossi is around 35–40 millimetres (1.4–1.6 in) in width and 35 millimetres (1.4 in) in height. It has a smooth central disk and a short stomach. Its gonads are long, oval, and bladder-like. Its rows of gastric filaments are composed of four clusters containing five filaments each.
