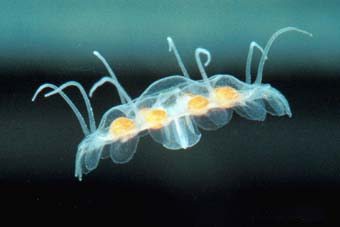

Scientific classification
- Kingdom: Animalia
- Phylum: Cnidaria
- Class: Scyphozoa
- Order: Coronatae
- Family: Nausithoidae
- Genus: Nausithoe
- Species: N. aurea

Binomial name
- Nausithoe aurea da Silveira and Morandini, 1997

= Nausithoe aurea =

Species of jellyfish

Nausithoe aurea, also known as the Nausithoe maculata, is a species of crown jellyfish found off the southeastern coast of Brazil. The central disc has been measured to be 10.5 mm. N. aurea is transparent with yellow and brown spots located around the gonads. N. aurea can reproduce either asexually by strobilation or sexually. Either ephyrae or planuloids may be produced by strobilation; only ephyrae can produce the medusal form. Strobilation can be induced to occur when food is abundant. In polyps, a large availability of food leads to strobilation if it is not regulated. N. aurea species usually take more than 20 weeks to begin the differentiation and development of reproductive organs.
