= Nausithoe globifera =

Scientific classification
- Kingdom: Animalia
- Phylum: Cnidaria
- Class: Scyphozoa
- Order: Coronatae
- Family: Nausithoidae
- Genus: Nausithoe
- Species: N. globifera

Binomial name
- Nausithoe globifera Broch, 1913

Species of jellyfish

Nausithoe globifera is a species of crown jellyfish in the family Nausithoidae. The species is ~22 millimeters in diameter, 10 millimeters of which is composed of the central disc.
