= Atolla russelli =

Scientific classification
- Domain: Eukaryota
- Kingdom: Animalia
- Phylum: Cnidaria
- Class: Scyphozoa
- Order: Coronatae
- Family: Atollidae
- Genus: Atolla
- Species: A. russelli

Binomial name
- Atolla russelli Repelin, 1962

Species of jellyfish

Atolla russelli is a species of true jellyfish in the family Atollidae. It is known from type specimens found in the north Pacific Ocean.

== Etymology ==
The genus name, Atolla, is derived from the word atoll.
