= Nausithoe thieli =

Scientific classification
- Kingdom: Animalia
- Phylum: Cnidaria
- Class: Scyphozoa
- Order: Coronatae
- Family: Nausithoidae
- Genus: Nausithoe
- Species: N. thieli

Binomial name
- Nausithoe thieli Jarms, 1990

Species of jellyfish

Nausithoe thieli is a species of crown jellyfish in the family Nausithoidae. The species can be found in the Mediterranean Sea and Western Indian Ocean.
