= Nausithoe clausi =

Scientific classification
- Kingdom: Animalia
- Phylum: Cnidaria
- Class: Scyphozoa
- Order: Coronatae
- Family: Nausithoidae
- Genus: Nausithoe
- Species: N. clausi

Binomial name
- Nausithoe clausi Vanhöffen, 1892

Species of jellyfish

Nausithoe clausi is a species of crown jellyfish in the family Nausithoidae. The species has been observed in the Western Central Pacific, and are ~0.9 centimeters wide.
