= Nausithoe eumedusoides =

Scientific classification
- Kingdom: Animalia
- Phylum: Cnidaria
- Class: Scyphozoa
- Order: Coronatae
- Family: Nausithoidae
- Genus: Nausithoe
- Species: N. eumedusoides

Binomial name
- Nausithoe eumedusoides (Werner, 1974)

Synonyms
- Stephanoscyphus eumedusoides Werner, 1974

Species of jellyfish

Nausithoe eumedusoides is a species of crown jellyfish in the family Nausithoidae. They have been observed as inhabiting the Mediterranean.
