= Nausithoe planulophora =

Scientific classification
- Kingdom: Animalia
- Phylum: Cnidaria
- Class: Scyphozoa
- Order: Coronatae
- Family: Nausithoidae
- Genus: Nausithoe
- Species: N. planulophora

Binomial name
- Nausithoe planulophora (Werner, 1971)

Synonyms
- Stephanoscyphus planulophora Werner, 1971

Species of jellyfish

Nausithoe planulophora is a species of crown jellyfish in the family Nausithoidae. They have only been obersved a handful of times, all off the coast of Hawaii in the Pacific Ocean.
