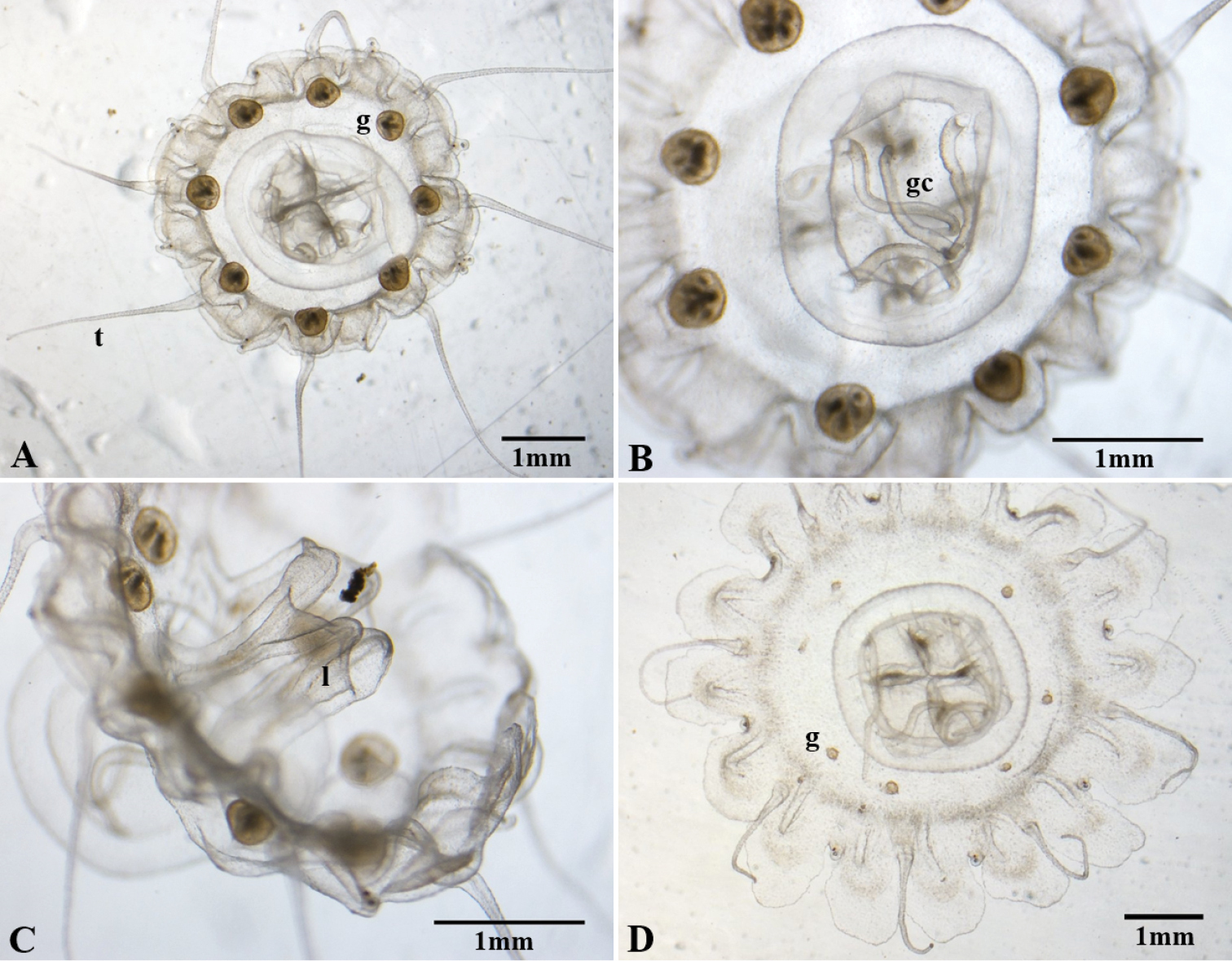

Scientific classification
- Kingdom: Animalia
- Phylum: Cnidaria
- Class: Scyphozoa
- Order: Coronatae
- Family: Nausithoidae
- Genus: Nausithoe
- Species: N. werneri

Binomial name
- Nausithoe werneri Jarms, 1990

= Nausithoe werneri =

Species of jellyfish

Nausithoe werneri is a species of crown jellyfish in the family Nausithoidae. They are concentrated off of the Brazilian coast.
