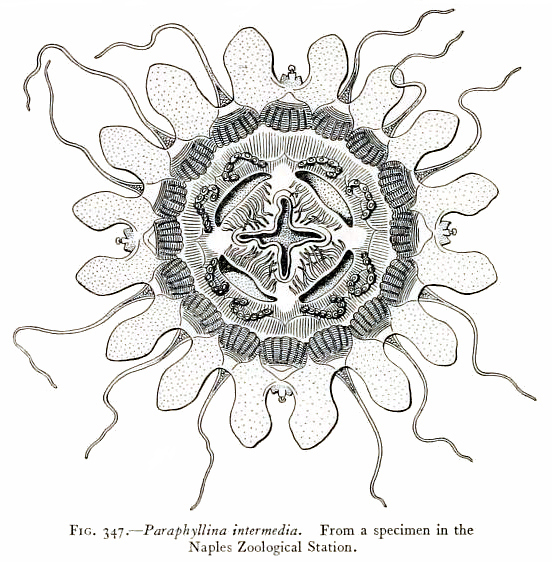
- Paraphyllina intermedia

Scientific classification
- Kingdom: Animalia
- Phylum: Cnidaria
- Class: Scyphozoa
- Order: Coronatae
- Family: Paraphyllinidae; Maas, 1903
- Genus: Paraphyllina; Maas, 1903

Species
- 3 species (see text)

= Paraphyllina =

Genus of jellyfishes

Paraphyllina is a genus of crown jellyfish. It is the only genus in the monotypic family Paraphyllinidae, and includes three species.

== Characteristics ==
Members of this family differ from members of Periphyllidae in having the four rhopalia (sensory organs) located on the bell margin on the radii, as opposed to between the radii.

== Species ==
The World Register of Marine Species lists the following species:

- Paraphyllina kubanci Artüz, 2023
- Paraphyllina intermedia Maas, 1903
- Paraphyllina ransoni Russell, 1956
- Paraphyllina rubra Neppi, 1915
