= Nausithoe challengeri =

Scientific classification
- Kingdom: Animalia
- Phylum: Cnidaria
- Class: Scyphozoa
- Order: Coronatae
- Family: Nausithoidae
- Genus: Nausithoe
- Species: N. challengeri

Binomial name
- Nausithoe challengeri (Haeckel, 1880)

Synonyms
- Nauphanta challengeri Haeckel, 1880

Species of jellyfish

Nausithoe challengeri is a species of crown jellyfish in the family Nausithoidae. Adult medusa are believed to be up to 12 millimeters in diameter, and the specimen has long and thin tentacles.
