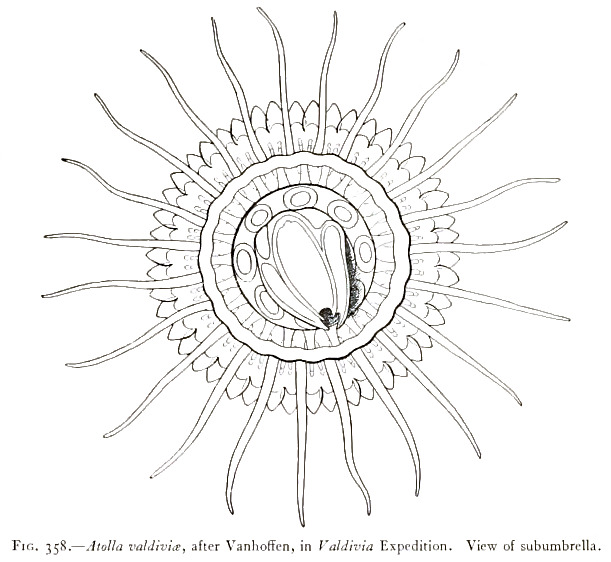

Scientific classification
- Domain: Eukaryota
- Kingdom: Animalia
- Phylum: Cnidaria
- Class: Scyphozoa
- Order: Coronatae
- Family: Atollidae
- Genus: Atolla
- Species: A. valdiviae

Binomial name
- Atolla valdiviae Vanhöffen, 1902

= Atolla valdiviae =

Species of jellyfish

Atolla valdiviae is a species of true jellyfish in the family Atollidae. It is known from type specimens found in the north Pacific Ocean.

== Etymology ==
The genus name, Atolla, is derived from the word atoll.
