= Atorella sibogae =

Scientific classification
- Domain: Eukaryota
- Kingdom: Animalia
- Phylum: Cnidaria
- Class: Scyphozoa
- Order: Coronatae
- Family: Atorellidae
- Genus: Atorella
- Species: A. sibogae

Binomial name
- Atorella sibogae (Leloup, 1937)

Species of jellyfish

Atorella sibogae is a species of crown jellyfish in the family Atorellidae. They are rarely seen, but have been observed in Asia and southern Africa.
