= Paraphyllina ransoni =

Scientific classification
- Domain: Eukaryota
- Kingdom: Animalia
- Phylum: Cnidaria
- Class: Scyphozoa
- Order: Coronatae
- Family: Paraphyllinidae
- Genus: Paraphyllina
- Species: P. ransoni

Binomial name
- Paraphyllina ransoni Russell, 1956

Species of jellyfish

Paraphyllina ransoni is a species of crown jellyfish within the family Paraphyllinidae. It is found distributed in the Pacific and Atlantic Ocean near the United States, Canada and Liberia, as well as in the Mediterranean Sea in deep pelagic waters. The bell reaches up to 75 millimeters wide, and is dome shaped with a thick mesoglea. Colorations are colourless with a reddish stomach, although some individuals are brownish red all over.
