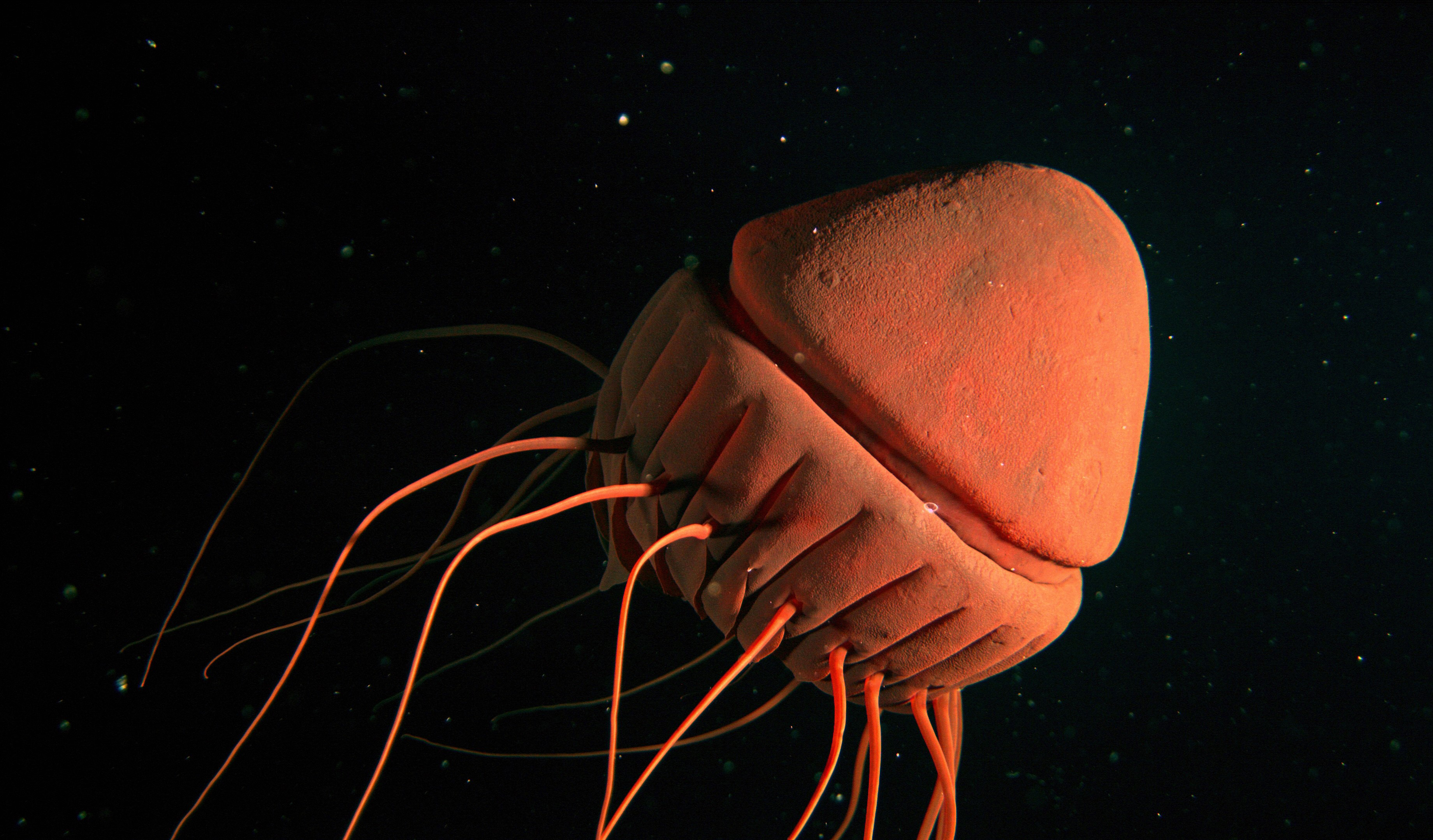

Scientific classification
- Domain: Eukaryota
- Kingdom: Animalia
- Phylum: Cnidaria
- Class: Scyphozoa
- Order: Coronatae
- Family: Periphyllidae
- Genus: Periphyllopsis
- Species: P. braueri

Binomial name
- Periphyllopsis braueri Vanhöffen, 1902

= Periphyllopsis braueri =

Deep-sea jellyfish

Periphyllopsis braueri is a red-colored jellyfish of the deep sea, belonging to the order Coronatae of the phylum Cnidaria. It is one of two species in the genus Periphyllopsis. It has only been documented ~18 times because of the depth that it resides at, and inhabits areas off the coast of Florida and Japan. The species has also been observed in the Gulf of Alaska.

== Ecology ==
Like several related species, Periphyllopsis braueri is capable of bioluminescence. In response to stimulus, it emits rapidly pulsating light from multiple sites, and expels luminous material into the water. Its reaction is similar to that of the related Periphylla periphylla.

The seven-arm octopus, Haliphron atlanticus, has been observed to prey on Periphyllopsis braueri.

== See also ==
- Helmet jellyfish
