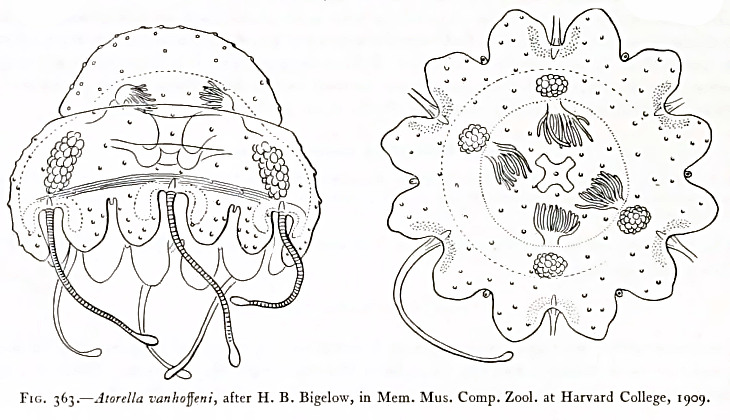
- Illustration of A. vanhoeffeni

Scientific classification
- Domain: Eukaryota
- Kingdom: Animalia
- Phylum: Cnidaria
- Class: Scyphozoa
- Order: Coronatae
- Family: Atorellidae
- Genus: Atorella
- Species: A. vanhoeffeni

Binomial name
- Atorella vanhoeffeni Bigelow, 1909

= Atorella vanhoeffeni =

Species of jellyfish

Atorella vanhoeffeni, also known as the gold-spotted crown jelly, is a species of true jellyfish in the family Atorellidae.

== Etymology ==
The specific epithet was given in honor of Ernst Vanhöffen, who originally described the genus Atorella. The vernacular name "gold-spotted crown jelly" is in reference to the bioluminescent orange color of its gonads and the tips of its tentacles.

== Description ==
The bell of Atorella vanhoeffeni is 3–5 millimetres (0.12–0.20 in) high and 4.5–7 millimetres (0.18–0.28 in) wide. It has a deep, distinct ring furrow. The outside of its bell has several nematocyst warts that extend over the lappets. The marginal lappets are long and oval-like in shape; it has 12, with six tentacles and six rhopalia between them. The stomach is flattened and shallow. Its gastric filaments are arranged in four groups. The amount of filaments in each group has been reported to be as much as 80–100 to as few as 20–30. Each group arises from a gelatinous stalk. The mouth is cross-shaped, with four short lips. It has four leaf-shaped gonads, which are split down the middle; the female gonads contain large eggs. Its tentacles are about as long as the bell's diameter, occasionally longer, and have a knob-shaped swelling at their tips. The swelling is partially related to nematocysts, which litter the tips of the tentacles. The tips of the tentacles are a bright orange-yellow color, as are the gonads; this is used by the species to lure and then paralyze plankton via aggressive mimicry. However, the gonads have been reported as being a beige color as well. Otherwise, the species is colorless and transparent.
