= Nausithoe limpida =

Scientific classification
- Kingdom: Animalia
- Phylum: Cnidaria
- Class: Scyphozoa
- Order: Coronatae
- Family: Nausithoidae
- Genus: Nausithoe
- Species: N. limpida

Binomial name
- Nausithoe limpida Hartlaub, 1909

Species of jellyfish

Nausithoe limpida is a species of crown jellyfish in the family Nausithoidae. An adult medusae is ~6 millimeters in diameter, and the species is possibly extinct.
