= Atolla parva =

Scientific classification
- Domain: Eukaryota
- Kingdom: Animalia
- Phylum: Cnidaria
- Class: Scyphozoa
- Order: Coronatae
- Family: Atollidae
- Genus: Atolla
- Species: A. parva

Binomial name
- Atolla parva Russell, 1958

Species of jellyfish

Atolla parva is a species of true jellyfish in the family Atollidae. It is found in the north Atlantic Ocean and in waters around New Zealand.

== Etymology ==
The genus name, Atolla, is derived from the word atoll. The specific epithet is derived from the Latin parvus, meaning "small"; this is in reference to the species' small size, with it generally not being larger than 30 millimetres (1.2 in) in diameter.
