= Nausithoe atlantica =

Scientific classification
- Kingdom: Animalia
- Phylum: Cnidaria
- Class: Scyphozoa
- Order: Coronatae
- Family: Nausithoidae
- Genus: Nausithoe
- Species: N. atlantica

Binomial name
- Nausithoe atlantica Broch, 1913

Species of jellyfish

Nausithoe atlantica is a species of crown jellyfish in the family Nausithoidae. They have only been encountered ~38 times by humans since records began, and inhabit the deep sea.
