= Nausithoe picta =

Scientific classification
- Kingdom: Animalia
- Phylum: Cnidaria
- Class: Scyphozoa
- Order: Coronatae
- Family: Nausithoidae
- Genus: Nausithoe
- Species: N. picta

Binomial name
- Nausithoe picta Agassiz & Mayer, 1902

Species of jellyfish

Nausithoe picta is a species of crown jellyfish in the family Nausithoidae. It is found in the south Pacific Ocean.

== Description ==
Nausithoe picta has a flat bell that's around 17 millimetres (0.67 in) in diameter, and is a translucent, milky color. It has eight tentacles that are about the length of the radius of the bell. It has eight rhopalia that alternate with the tentacles, and 16 marginal lappets. The rhopalia each have an ocellus and an otolith. The ocelli are a brown color. The mouth is a cross-shaped slit with four short lips. Four groups of gastric filaments alternate in position with the lips, each containing around a dozen filaments. The cores of the filaments are a dark blue. It has eight gonads that are a rich brown color.
