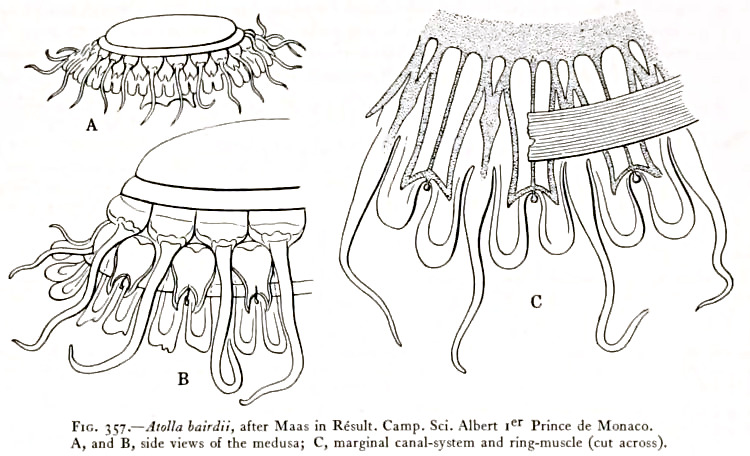

Scientific classification
- Kingdom: Animalia
- Phylum: Cnidaria
- Class: Scyphozoa
- Order: Coronatae
- Family: Atollidae
- Genus: Atolla
- Species: A. bairdii

Binomial name
- Atolla bairdii Fewkes, 1886

= Atolla bairdii =

Species of jellyfish

Atolla bairdii is a species of true jellyfish in the family Atollidae. It is known from type specimens found in the north Atlantic Ocean, near Cape Hatteras.

== Etymology ==
The genus name, Atolla, is derived from the word atoll.
