= Nausithoe simplex =

Scientific classification
- Kingdom: Animalia
- Phylum: Cnidaria
- Class: Scyphozoa
- Order: Coronatae
- Family: Nausithoidae
- Genus: Nausithoe
- Species: N. simplex

Binomial name
- Nausithoe simplex (Kirkpatrick, 1890)

Synonyms
- Stephanoscyphus simplex Kirkpatrick, 1890

Species of jellyfish

Nausithoe simplex is a species of crown jellyfish in the family Nausithoidae. The species is found in the Indian Ocean, and are gonochoric.
