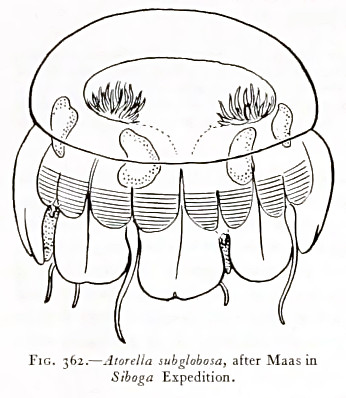

Scientific classification
- Domain: Eukaryota
- Kingdom: Animalia
- Phylum: Cnidaria
- Class: Scyphozoa
- Order: Coronatae
- Family: Atorellidae
- Genus: Atorella
- Species: A. subglobosa

Binomial name
- Atorella subglobosa Vanhöffen, 1902

= Atorella subglobosa =

Species of jellyfish

Atorella subglobosa is a species of crown jellyfish in the family Atorellidae. The species was collected from marine waters near Indonesia during the Siboga expedition and described by Ernst Vanhöffen in 1902.
