= Paraphyllina rubra =

Scientific classification
- Domain: Eukaryota
- Kingdom: Animalia
- Phylum: Cnidaria
- Class: Scyphozoa
- Order: Coronatae
- Family: Paraphyllinidae
- Genus: Paraphyllina
- Species: P. rubra

Binomial name
- Paraphyllina rubra Neppi, 1915

Species of jellyfish

Paraphyllina rubra is a species of crown jellyfish in the family Paraphyllinidae. It is about 1.5 cm (0.59 in) wide, has 8 gonads, and is usually dark-brown in color.
