= Nausithoe racemosa =

Scientific classification
- Kingdom: Animalia
- Phylum: Cnidaria
- Class: Scyphozoa
- Order: Coronatae
- Family: Nausithoidae
- Genus: Nausithoe
- Species: N. racemosa

Binomial name
- Nausithoe racemosa (Komai, 1936)

Synonyms
- Stephanoscyphus racemosus Komai, 1936

Species of jellyfish

Nausithoe racemosa is a species of crown jellyfish in the family Nausithoidae. They are found in the Marshall Islands, and are poisonous.
