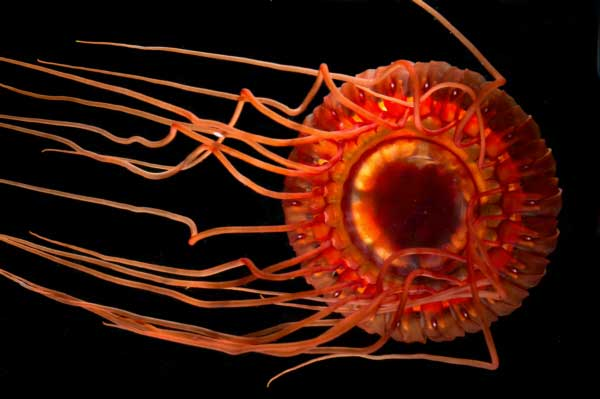
- Atolla jellyfish (Atolla wyvillei)

Scientific classification
- Kingdom: Animalia
- Phylum: Cnidaria
- Class: Scyphozoa
- Order: Coronatae
- Family: Atollidae; Bigelow, 1913
- Genus: Atolla; Haeckel, 1880

Synonyms
- Collapsis Haeckel, 1880

= Atolla =

Genus of jellyfishes

Atolla is a genus of crown jellyfish in the order Coronatae. The genus Atolla was originally proposed by Haeckel in 1880 and elevated to the monotypic family level, as Atollidae by Henry Bigelow in 1913. The six known species inhabit the mesopelagic zone. The medusae possess multiple lobes called lappets at the bell margin. Medusae also have eight tentacles, alternating with eight rhopalia, and twice as many lappets occur as tentacles.

== Species ==
- Atolla bairdii Fewkes, 1886
- Atolla chuni Vanhöffen, 1902
- Atolla clara Gershwin & Gordon, 2014
- Atolla gigantea Maas, 1897
- Atolla parva Russell, 1958
- Atolla reynoldsi Matsumoto et al., 2022
- Atolla russelli Repelin, 1962
- Atolla tenella Hartlaub, 1909
- Atolla valdiviae Vanhöffen, 1902
- Atolla vanhoeffeni Russell, 1957
- Atolla verrillii Fewkes, 1886
- Atolla wyvillei Haeckel, 1880
