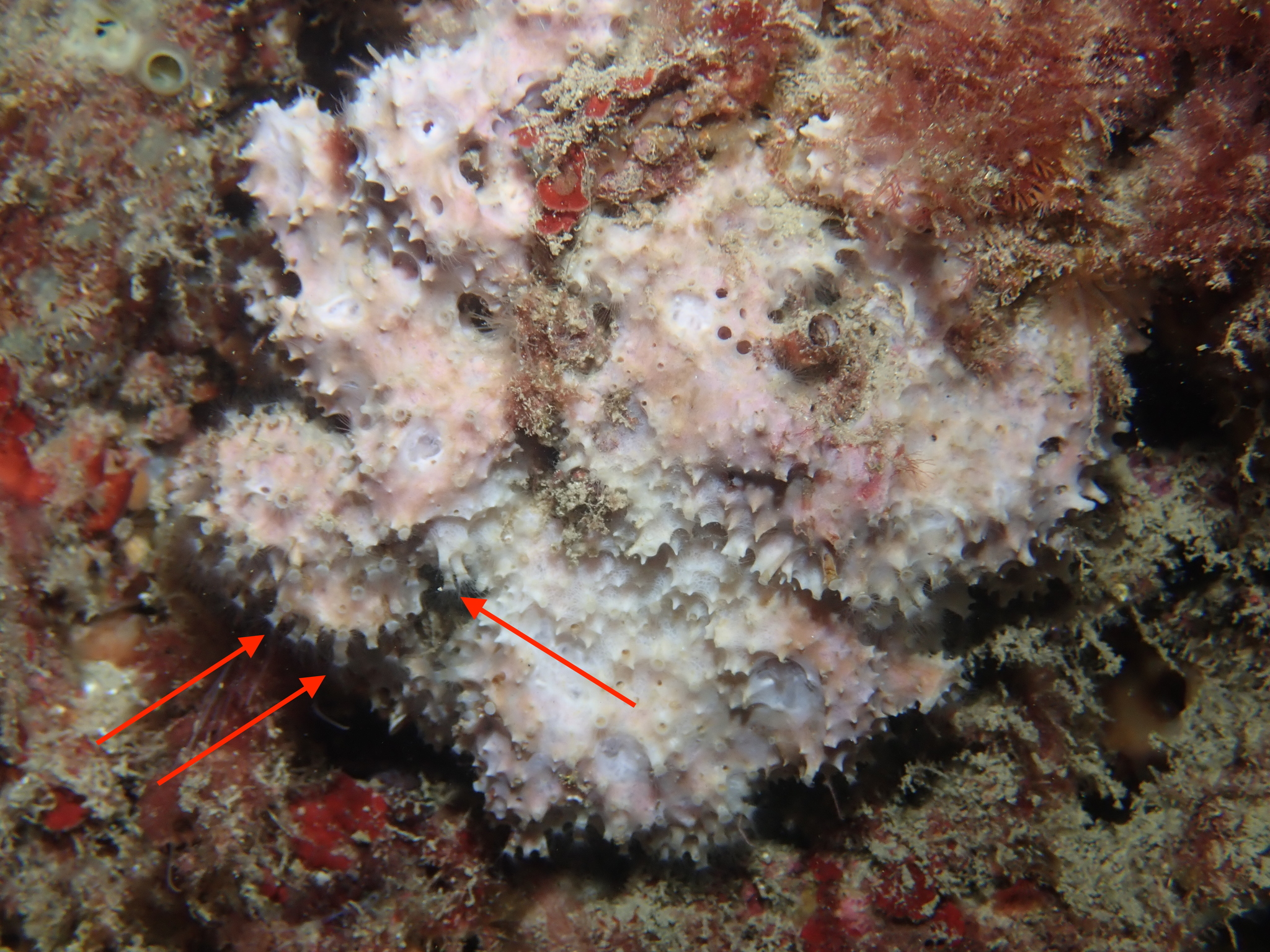

Scientific classification
- Kingdom: Animalia
- Phylum: Cnidaria
- Class: Scyphozoa
- Order: Coronatae
- Family: Nausithoidae
- Genus: Nausithoe
- Species: N. punctata

Binomial name
- Nausithoe punctata Kölliker, 1853

= Nausithoe punctata =

Species of jellyfish

Nausithoe punctata is a species of crown jellyfish in the family Nausithoidae. They are widespread throughout the oceans, and are believed to be ~0.9 to 1.5 centimeters wide with a thick central disk.
