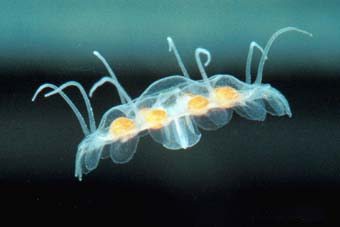
- Nausithoe aurea

Scientific classification
- Kingdom: Animalia
- Phylum: Cnidaria
- Class: Scyphozoa
- Order: Coronatae
- Family: Nausithoidae; Bigelow, 1913

Genera
- Nausithoe; Palephyra; Thecoscyphus

= Nausithoidae =

Family of jellyfishes

Nausithoidae is a family of jellyfish.

== Genera ==
- Nausithoe
  - Nausithoe albatrossi (Maas, 1897)
  - Nausithoe atlantica (Broch, 1914)
  - Nausithoe aurea Da Silveira & Morandini, 1997
  - Nausithoe challengeri (Haeckel, 1880)
  - Nausithoe clausi (Vanhöffen, 1892)
  - Nausithoe eumedusoides Werner, 1974
  - Nausithoe globifera (Bloch, 1914)
  - Nausithoe hagenbeckii Jarms, 2001
  - Nausithoe limpida (Hartlaub, 1909)
  - Nausithoe maculata Jarms, 1990
  - Nausithoe marginata (Kölliker, 1853)
  - Nausithoe picta (Agassiz & Mayer, 1902)
  - Nausithoe planulophora (Werner, 1971)
  - Nausithoe punctata (Kölliker, 1853)
  - Nausithoe racemosa (Komai, 1936)
  - Nausithoe rubra (Vanhöffen, 1902)
  - Nausithoe simplex (Kirkpatrick, 1890)
  - Nausithoe sorbei Jarms, Tiemann & Prados, 2003
  - Nausithoe striata (Vanhöffen, 1910)
  - Nausithoe thieli Jarms, 1990
  - Nausithoe werneri Jarms, 1990
- Palephyra
  - Palephyra antiqua
  - Palephyra indica (Vanhöffen, 1902)
  - Palephyra pelagica (Haeckel, 1880)
- Thecoscyphus
  - Thecoscyphus zibrowii Werner, 1984
