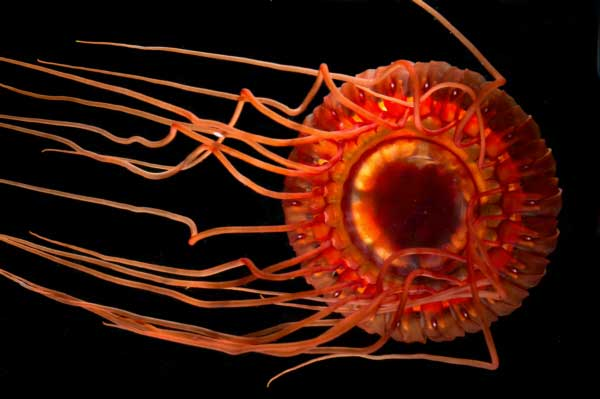

Scientific classification
- Kingdom: Animalia
- Phylum: Cnidaria
- Class: Scyphozoa
- Order: Coronatae
- Family: Atollidae
- Genus: Atolla
- Species: A. wyvillei

Binomial name
- Atolla wyvillei Haeckel, 1880

Synonyms
- Atolla alexandri Maas, 1897; Collaspis achillis Haeckel, 1880

= Atolla jellyfish =

Species of jellyfish

Atolla wyvillei, also known as the Atolla jellyfish, Coronate medusa, and deep-sea jellyfish, is a species of deep-sea crown jellyfish (Scyphozoa: Coronatae). It lives in oceans around the world. Like many species of mid-water animals, it is deep red in color. This species was named in honor of Sir Charles Wyville Thomson, chief scientist on the Challenger expedition.

It typically has 20 marginal tentacles and one hypertrophied tentacle which is larger than the rest. This long trailing tentacle is thought to facilitate prey capture.

This species is bioluminescent. When attacked, it will launch a series of flashes, whose function is to draw predators who will be more interested in the attacker than itself. This has earned the animal the nickname "alarm jellyfish".

Marine biologist Edith Widder created a device based on the Atolla jellyfish's distress flashes called the E-jelly, which has been used successfully and efficiently to lure in mysterious and rarely seen deep-sea animals for filming and documentation. The device's mimicry of the live animal was such that it successfully lured in a giant squid in an expedition financed by Discovery Channel and NHK to find the creature.

== Description ==
The body of Atolla wyvillei has a bell shape, of around 20–174 mm (0.79–6.85 in) in diameter, and is rimmed by several moderately long tentacles, including a single, long, hypertrophied tentacle, which has several purposes, including aid in predation as well as aid in reproduction. These jellyfish do not have a digestive system, a respiratory system, a circulatory system, or a central nervous system.

== Distribution and habitat ==
Atolla wyvillei is found around the globe in the deep ocean. There has been evidence of them at a depth from 1,000 to 4,000 m (3,300 to 13,100 ft), an area commonly called the "Midnight Zone".

== Behavior and ecology ==
=== Reproduction ===
Atolla wyvillei can reproduce in two different ways. They can reproduce asexually like many other jellyfish species. This process involves the development into polyps that then produce buds that grow into larvae. Atolla wyvillei can also reproduce sexually. They attach themselves to another Atolla wyvillei by grabbing them with their hypertrophied tentacle and pulling themselves toward the other to mate.

=== Feeding ===
Atolla wyvillei have been found to prey on crustaceans and other floating nutrients. Atolla wyvillei can trap its prey through the use of its hypertrophied tentacle. It can passively catch its prey by leaving the tentacle extended and allow it to catch things that may be floating nearby. The colors of its body as well as the light it emits, prevents the bioluminescent nature of its prey from being discovered inside of it. This may also be why they live in the depths as opposed to near the surface of the ocean. Thus, the ability to extend its tentacles to catch prey is only found in the specific species that live in the depths, even though this trait is not guaranteed for all of them.

=== Bioluminescence ===
Bioluminescence is the production of visible light by a living organism. Bioluminescence is a common phenomenon in marine animals found in the deep sea. Atolla wyvillei has adapted a safety response to avoid predation. When Atolla wyvillei is attacked it produces an array of blue light flashes. The propagation rate of these flashes are 5–50 cm/s (2.0–19.7 in/s) and they propagate in circular waves. It is because of these blue flashes that Atolla wyvillei has been nicknamed the "alarm jelly". It is believed that the purpose of these flashes is to attract a bigger predator than the one that was currently attacking it. It is an attempt to scare the predator that is currently attacking it with a larger predator that could possibly prey on the predator attacking it.

== Threats ==
There has been evidence that Atolla wyvillei is threatened by shrimp. Other species of crown jellyfish (Coronatae), the same order of jellyfish Atolla belongs to, are caught and eaten in Japan.
