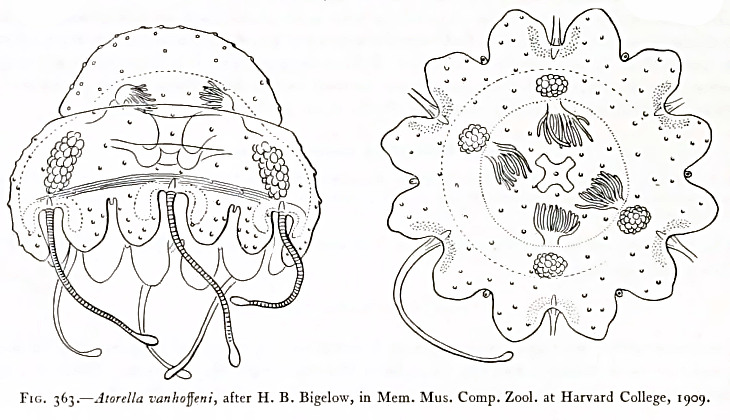
- An illustration of Atorella vanhoffeni

Scientific classification
- Domain: Eukaryota
- Kingdom: Animalia
- Phylum: Cnidaria
- Class: Scyphozoa
- Order: Coronatae
- Family: Atorellidae; Vanhöffen, 1902
- Genus: Atorella; Vanhöffen, 1902

Species
- 5 species (see text)

= Atorella =

Genus of jellyfishes

Atorella is a genus of crown jellyfish. It is the only genus in the monotypic family Atorellidae and includes five species. Members of this family are known from the eastern coast of Africa and the western coast of Panama.

== Characteristics ==
Members of this genus are characterised by having exactly six tentacles and six rhopalia, twelve marginal lappets and twelve pedalia. The bell ranges from 5 to 17 mm (0.20 to 0.67 in) in diameter. The bell is colourless and transparent and the four orange gonads can be seen inside. The mouth has four lips.

== Species ==
The World Register of Marine Species lists the following species:-

- Atorella arcturi Bigelow, 1928
- Atorella japonica Kawaguti & Matsuno, 1981
- Atorella octogonos Mills, Larson & Young, 1987
- Atorella sibogae Leloup, 1937
- Atorella subglobosa Vanhöffen, 1902
- Atorella vanhoeffeni Bigelow, 1909
