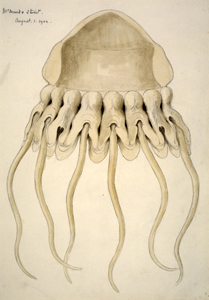

Scientific classification
- Kingdom: Animalia
- Phylum: Cnidaria
- Class: Scyphozoa
- Order: Coronatae
- Family: Periphyllidae
- Genus: Periphylla; F. Müller, 1861
- Species: P. periphylla

Binomial name
- Periphylla periphylla (Péron & Lesueur, 1810)

Synonyms
- Carybdea periphylla Peron & Lesueur, 1810; Medusa hyacinthina Faber, 1829; Periphylla humilis Fewkes, 1886; Periphylla hyacinthina Haeckel, 1880; Periphylla mirabilis Haeckel, 1880; Periphylla regina Haeckel, 1880

= Helmet jellyfish =

Species of jellyfish

The helmet jellyfish (Periphylla periphylla), sometimes called the merchant-cap, is a luminescent, red-colored jellyfish of the deep sea, belonging to the order Coronatae of the phylum Cnidaria. It is the only species in the monotypic genus Periphylla and a rare example of a scyphozoan with a polyp-less life cycle, occurring exclusively as a medusa.
Periphylla is intensely photophobic, and thus only seldom leaves the bathypelagic zone (likely only on particularly dark nights).

== Description ==
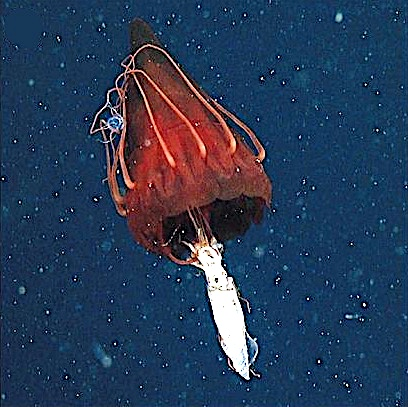
Helmet jellyfish feeding on an armhook squid underwater

Helmet jellyfish reach a body size of up to 30 cm (12 in). The average wet weight of the jellyfish is 540 grams. Overall, helmet jellyfish have a uniform size. They consist 90% of water, the rest being tissue and gelatinous mass, which give the animals their form. They have a biochemical content consisting of a small amount of carbohydrates, an average amount of lipids, and a large content of proteins.

They light themselves from within by means of bioluminescence, with red flashes serving as a signal amongst themselves. Between their marginal lobes sit small sense bulbs, by which the helmet jellyfish can distinguish between light and dark. They have been observed to avoid light, thus being photophobic.

The helmet jellyfish has twelve tentacles consisting of layers of endoderm and mesoglea, but each jellyfish can have a different type of tentacle posture. Through observational studies, it was found that within 51 observed jellyfish, there were 8 different tentacle postures. The two most common type of tentacle postures are straight-extended tentacles with a 45-degree angle in respect to the oral-aboral body axis, and straight-extended tentacles with a 45 to 90-degree angle in respect to the oral-aboral body axis. These tentacle postures are how each individual helmet jellyfish swims.

== Habitat and behavior ==
The helmet jellyfish is found in depths up to 2700 meters and is adapted to its dark environment. Not only have they become adapted and more abundant in darker environments, but they are also found in opaque and cloudy waters. They are found in these deep and dark waters due to the fact that sunlight can be harmful to adult helmet jellyfish, and even deadlier to younger ones.

The depth that helmet jellyfish inhabit varies throughout the day. They are found in abundance at a depth of approximately 13.75 m during nighttime, and as deep as 150 m during daytime. Their abundance at 150 m during daytime is nearly three times than during nighttime. Helmet jellyfish were also seen as far below the surface as 250 m. At this depth, one-third of the total population inhabited the lower water column during daylight while less than 10% were found at the same depths after sunset. This observation shows that they are constantly migrating vertically throughout the depths based on the available sunlight at the time. Their presence at different depths also depends on their physical size and age. Helmet jellyfish of smaller size or less fit juveniles consistently have been found at higher depths across different locations.

Through vertical swimming, the jellyfish can move at various speeds. The majority of their vertical swimming is at a speed of <2 cm/s, but can reach over 10 cm/s for a short time span. If they do reach this speed, it is assumed that they follow this with a time of no vertical movement. They move by swimming with their tentacles in an aboral position. Their tentacles also have various unique muscles, including longitudinal, ring-, radial-, and diagonal musculatures. The two most unique are the longitudinal and the diagonal musculature. The longitudinal is used for consuming prey by moving very quickly to the jellyfish's mouth. The diagonal is used for the corkscrew reaction used to obtain and capture prey. With a full stomach it returns from the surface back to the depths. Other deep-sea inhabitants may feed upon its faeces.

In 2017, helmet jellyfish were caught to be studied to determine their main prey. In this experiment it was found that each had only an average of five different prey species in their digestive system. The prey in their digestive system was examined as well as their relative abundance. There was a 27% presence of copepods, 23% of pteropods, 20% of amphipods, 17% of euphausiids, and 13% of chaetognaths.

== Reproductive cycle ==
Periphylla periphylla represents an exception, very rarely found in the phylum Cnidaria: the medusae do not go through a polyp stage, thus presenting a "holopelagic" life cycle. They also do not undergo an ephyra stage as well as a sessile stage. The helmet jellyfish is also unique in its growth and sexual reproduction in that they are the only known scyphozoan that undergoes sexual propagation but lacks the planula stage. During reproduction, the female helmet jellyfish contain thousands of eggs within their gonads. Their eggs are actually the largest sized eggs within all Cnidaria; despite this however, females will only produce a small number of eggs. The jellyfish release their eggs on the surface of the water, where they rapidly sink to a depth that limits visibility of predators. The medusae release fertilized eggs in open water and these develop directly into medusae, whose development rests entirely upon the egg's high yolk supply:

- This yolk supply is seen during the first stage of development and is found inside of a network of plasma strains. This is when nuclei dispersed, and many of them are only found during this stage.
- During the second stage of development a minor indentation is seen, which then develops into a mouth. The yolk supply has by then shrunk to only one to two layers above the nucleus. An acid mucus develops through secretion of the endodermal layer.
- As the jellyfish enters its third stage of development a smooth pit is visible on its anterior end. There is the first indication of a mouth, and their body shape resembles a hat. The amount of yolk granules decrease throughout this stage, and occur in three to four layers.
- The fourth stage of development shows their “umbrella” to have four indentations which creates the gastric septa on its inside. This stage is when there is the first indication of a histone.
- As for stage five, there are now sixteen lappets and four rhopalic buds developed. Their medusa shape is much more defined. There is also nearly no yolk present.
- Stage six of development is when the first glimpse of an opaque jelly is seen. At the end of the hypstome, the cross-shaped mouth is now opened.
- The seventh stage of development is when they begin to take on their medusa jellyfish shape. They have twelve tentacles as well as four interradial rhopalia. They do not begin to show pigmentation in this stage, but this stage is when cilia is first seen.
- The final eighth stage is known for when the purple pigmentation of the helmet jellyfish is now seen in their mouth and stomach.

== Distribution ==
The helmet jellyfish is found in nearly every ocean of the world, as well as in the Norwegian fjords and in the Mediterranean Sea. The only ocean they are not known to inhabit is the Arctic Ocean, despite being found commonly in fjords located within Lurefjorden and western Spitsbergen, Norway. They can also be found in the Iceland and Greenland Seas. Additionally, there has been an increase in their population throughout the northern Barents Sea in recent years. Their distribution throughout these different locations are greatly influenced by the depths of water, abundance of food sources, and preferred light intensities. Their distribution can also be affected by physical conditions, and they have been observed to position themselves further from the surface of the water if there are harsh weather conditions or to avoid too much sunlight.

Their distribution can be affected by water temperature. The vast majority of helmet jellyfish live in temperatures ranging from 4 - 11°C but they are able to survive in water temperatures reaching up to nearly 20°C.
