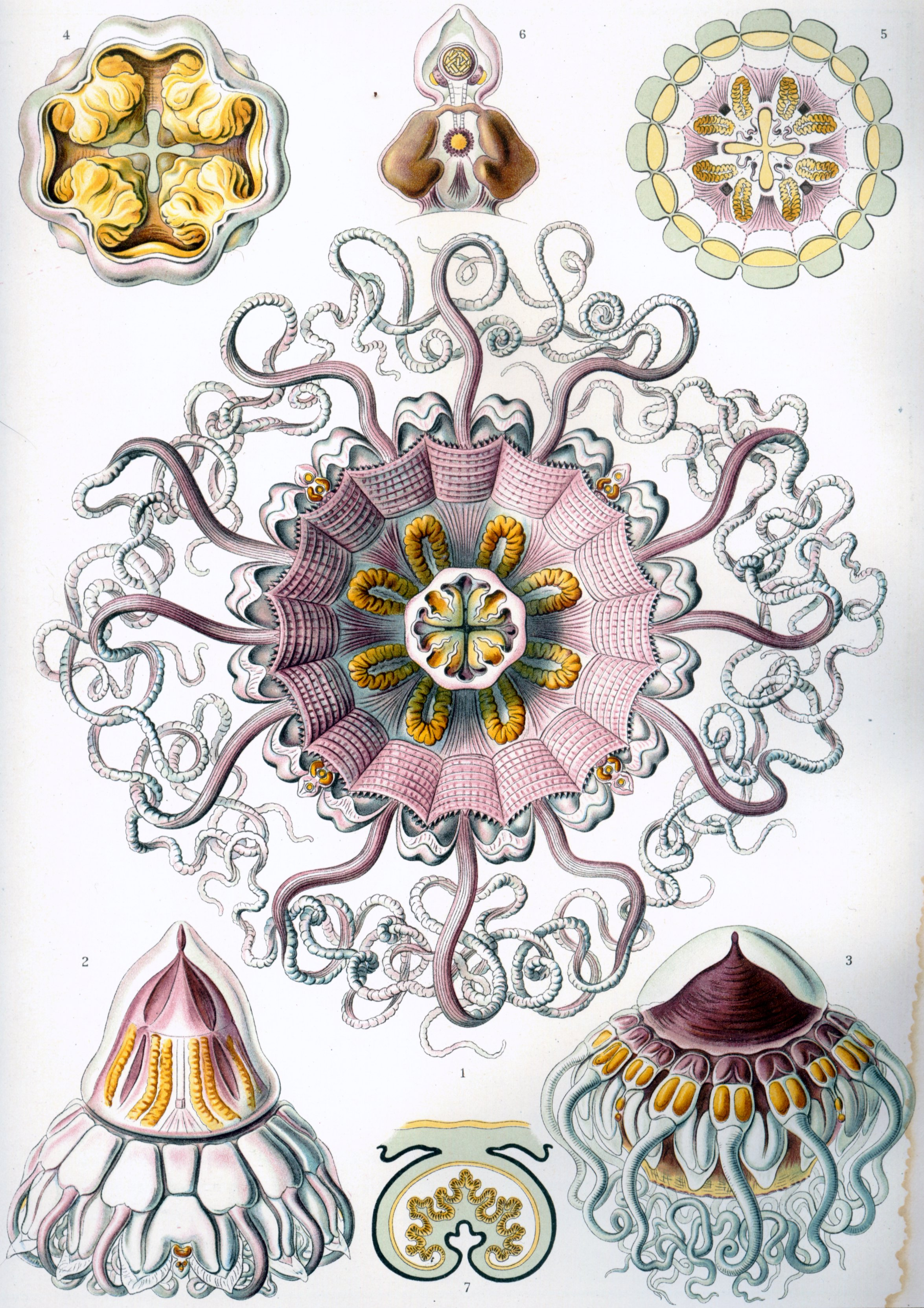
- Periphylla periphylla, illustration by Ernst Haeckel

Scientific classification
- Kingdom: Animalia
- Phylum: Cnidaria
- Class: Scyphozoa
- Order: Coronatae
- Family: Periphyllidae; Haeckel, 1880

Genera
- Nauphantopsis; Pericolpa; Periphylla; Periphyllopsis

= Periphyllidae =

Family of jellyfishes

Periphyllidae is a family of jellyfish containing four genera and six species. The most well-known member of the family, Periphylla periphylla, is usually considered a deep-sea species, but it forms large blooms in surface waters of Norwegian fjords.

== Genera ==
- Nauphantopsis
  - Nauphantopsis diomedeae Fewkes, 1885
- Pericolpa
  - Pericolpa campana (Haeckel, 1880)
  - Pericolpa quadrigata Haeckel, 1880
- Periphylla
  - Periphylla periphylla (helmet jellyfish) (Péron & Lesueur, 1810)
- Periphyllopsis
  - Periphyllopsis braueri Vanhöffen, 1902
  - Periphyllopsis galatheae Kramp, 1959
