= Steven Haddock =

Steven H. D. Haddock is a marine biologist known for his work on bioluminescence of the jellylike animals of the open ocean and the deep sea, and the photoproteins and fluorescent proteins of these animals.

== Life ==
Haddock was educated at Harvey Mudd College, where he took his bachelor's degree, and the University of California, Santa Barbara, where he took his doctorate. He is a professor of ecology and evolutionary biology at the University of California, Santa Cruz, and a senior scientist at the Monterey Bay Aquarium Research Institute.

== Works ==
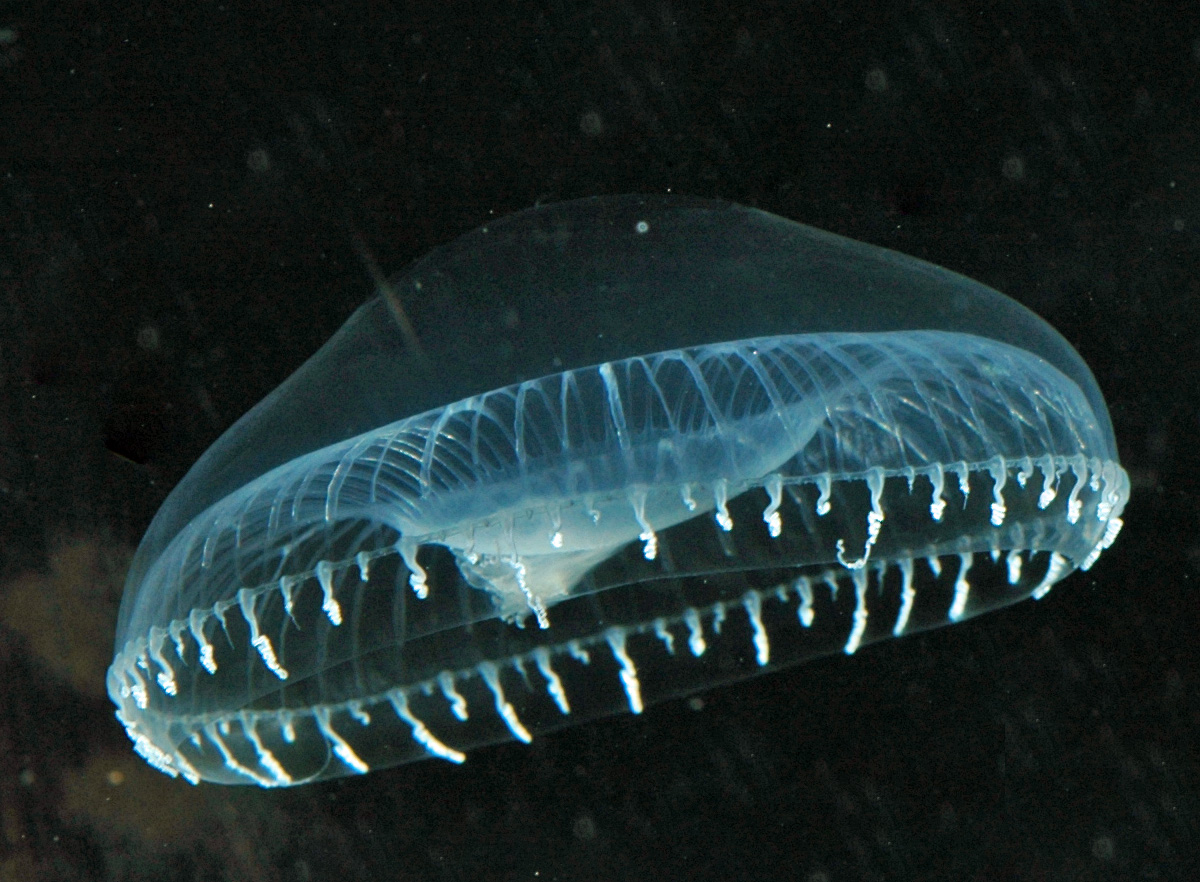
The bioluminescent crystal jellyfish Aequorea victoria

Haddock is the lead author of Practical computing for biologists (Sinauer, 2011). He has contributed to over 100 research papers on bioluminescence and related phenomena in open ocean and deep sea animals including Ctenophora, Siphonophorae, Radiolaria, and Medusae. His co-written paper "Broad phylogenomic sampling improves resolution of the animal tree of life" has been cited over 1675 times, while the review article "Bioluminescence in the sea" has been cited over 475 times.
