= Otto Maas (zoologist) =

German biologist (1867–1916)

Otto Philipp Maas
- Born: 30 July 1867; Mannheim
- Died: 17 March 1916 (aged 48); Munich
- Scientific career
- Fields: Zoology
- Author abbrev. (zoology): Maas

Otto Philipp Maas (born 30 July 1867 Mannheim; † 17 March 1916 Munich) was a German zoologist and university professor of evolutionary history.

== Life ==
Maas studied zoology and medicine at the universities of Munich, Strasbourg, and Berlin, and received his doctorate in 1890 with a thesis on the development of the freshwater sponge. In 1894, he became a professor of zoology and evolutionary history at the Ludwig-Maximilians-Universität München. In 1902, he was promoted to associate professor in Munich, and in 1908, he was given a paid personal teaching position in comparative and experimental evolutionary history, as well as a teaching position in general zoology at the Royal Bavarian Academy of Agriculture and Brewing in Weihenstephan. In addition to the general and experimental history of animal development, Maas was mainly concerned with the research into cnidarians and in this area was the first to describe the umbrella jellyfish Nausithoe albatrossi (Maas, 1897) and the hydrozoa Euphysora bigelowi - now Corymorpha bigelowi (Maas, 1905), which he named in honor of the US zoologist Henry Bryant Bigelow.

On 8 March 1906, Maas was admitted as a member of the Imperial Leopoldine-Carolinian German Academy of Natural Scientists under the registration number 3208 in the Zoology and Anatomy section.

== Selected publications ==
- Über die Entwicklung des Süfswasserschwammes. In: Journal of Scientific Zoology, 50, 1890, pp. 527–554, Plates XXII–XXIII BHL page 42561890
- Otto Maas (September 1897). "Die medusen". Memoirs of the Museum of Comparative Zoology (in German). 23 (1): 1–94. doi:10.5962/BHL.TITLE.39397. ISSN 1067-8611. OCLC 30489714. Wikidata Q51502895.
- Ueber Medusen aus dem Solenhofer Slate Schiefer und der unteren Kreide der Karpathan. In: Palaeontographica. Contributions to the Natural History of Prehistory, 48, Sixth Issue, April 1902, Stuttgart 1901–1902, pp. 297–322, Plates XXII–XXIII
- Maas, Otto, 1867-1916 (1903), Einführung in die experimentelle Entwickelungsgeschichte (Entwickelungsmechanik) (in German), Wiesbaden: J.F. Bergmann, doi:10.5962/BHL.TITLE.3938, LCCN 04009384, OCLC 8084327, OL 23296849M, Wikidata Q51468007
- Maas, Otto, 1867-1916 (1903). "Die scyphomedusen der Siboga-expedition". Siboga-Expeditie (in German). Leiden: Buchhandlung und druckerei vormals E. J. Brill. doi:10.5962/BHL.TITLE.11300. OCLC 6811072. OL 23295282M. Wikidata Q51389373.
- Maas, Otto, 1867-1916 (1904), Meduses provenant des campagnes des yachts Hirondelle et Princesse-Alice .. (in French), Munich, doi:10.5962/BHL.TITLE.58248, OCLC 12203424, OL 25473121M, Wikidata Q51502903
- Otto Maas (1905). "Die craspedoten Medusen der Siboga-Expedition". Siboga-Expeditie (in German). Leiden: Buchhandlung und druckerei vormals E.J. Brill. doi:10.5962/BHL.TITLE.11301. OCLC 1900890. OL 18161765M. Wikidata Q51389379.
- Lebensbedingungen und verbreitung der tiere (Living conditions and distribution of animals). Teubner, Leipzig 1907 ( digital copy )
- Maas, Otto, 1867-1916 (1911). "Japanische medusen". Abhandlungen der Bayerischen Akademie der Wissenschaften. Mathematisch-naturwissenschaftliche Klasse (in German). I. Munich: 1–52. doi:10.5962/BHL.TITLE.6252. OCLC 21453772. OL 22883859M. Wikidata Q51496518.
- Otto Maas; Otto Renner (1912), Einführung in die Biologie (in German), Munich: R. Oldenbourg, doi:10.5962/BHL.TITLE.3720, OCLC 18108284, OL 22879221M, Wikidata Q51468000

== Publications about Maas ==
- Cristina Herbst (ed.): Hedwig Pringsheim. Diaries. Volume 2, 1892–1897. Wallstein Verlag, Göttingen 2013, pp. 706–707
- Wilhelm Roux : Obituary. Professor Otto Maas. In: Archives for Developmental Mechanics of Organisms, 42, 1916, pp. 508–512
