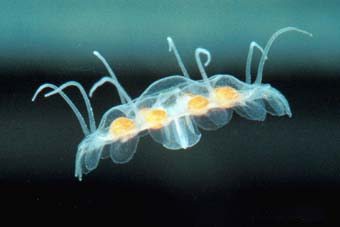
- Nausithoe aurea

Scientific classification
- Kingdom: Animalia
- Phylum: Cnidaria
- Class: Scyphozoa
- Order: Coronatae
- Family: Nausithoidae
- Genus: Nausithoe; Kölliker, 1853

Synonyms
- Nauphanta Haeckel, 1880; Nausicaa Haeckel, 1880

= Nausithoe (cnidarian) =

Genus of fishes

Nausithoe is a genus of jellyfishes belonging to the family Nausithoidae.

The genus has almost cosmopolitan distribution.

== Species ==
There are 22 species recognized in the genus Nausithoe

- Nausithoe albatrossi (Maas, 1897)
- Nausithoe albida Gegenbaur, 1856
- Nausithoe atlantica Broch 1913
- Nausithoe challengeri (Haeckel, 1880)
- Nausithoe clausi Vanhöffen, 1892
- Nausithoe eumedusoides (Werner, 1974)
- Nausithoe globifera Broch, 1913
- Nausithoe hagenbecki Jarms, 2001
- Nausithoe limpida Hartlaub, 1909
- Nausithoe maculata Jarms, 1990 accepted as Nausithoe aurea Silveira & Morandini, 1997
- Nausithoe marginata Kölliker, 1853
- Nausithoe phaeacum Haeckel, 1880
- Nausithoe picta Agassiz & Mayer, 1902
- Nausithoe planulophora Werner, 1971
- Nausithoe punctata Kölliker, 1853
- Nausithoe racemosa (Komai, 1936)
- Nausithoe rubra Vanhöffen, 1902
- Nausithoe simplex (Kirkpatrick, 1890)
- Nausithoe sorbei Jarms, Tiemann & Altuna Prados, 2003
- Nausithoe thieli Jarms, 1990
- Nausithoe werneri Jarms, 1990
