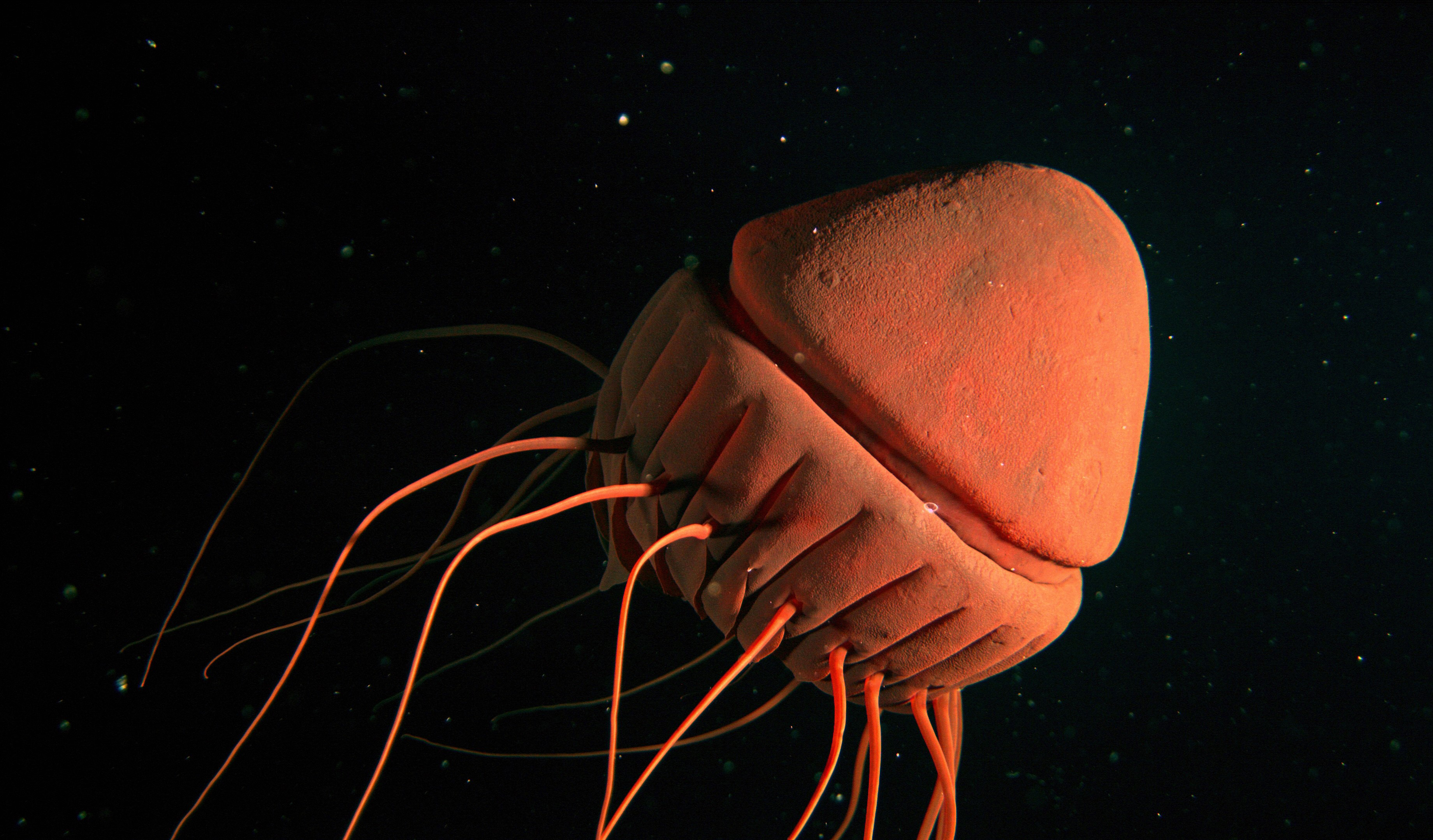
- Periphyllopsis braueri

Scientific classification
- Kingdom: Animalia
- Phylum: Cnidaria
- Class: Scyphozoa
- Order: Coronatae; Vanhöffen, 1892

= Crown jellyfish =

Crown jellyfishes

Order of cnidarians with a deep groove around the bell

Crown jellyfishes are the six families of true jellyfish that belong to the order Coronatae. They are distinguished from other jellyfish by the presence of a deep groove running around the umbrella, giving them the crown shape from which they take their name. Many of the species in the order inhabit deep sea environments.

Crown jellyfish are able to make light through bioluminescence. When they are touched, their bells will light up. Otherwise, the bell of a crown jellyfish will look transparent when undisturbed. When they are attacked, crown jellyfish are able to startle, mislead, and distract their predators with the light that they produce. They may also use their bioluminescence to lure or dazzle their prey.

== Families ==
As of 2016, 53 recognized extant species were in the order Coronatae, spread throughout 12 genera. These belong in the following six families:

- Atollidae (Hickson, 1906)— one genus, seven species
- Atorellidae (Vanhöffen, 1902)— one genus, five species
- Coronatae incertae sedis — one genus, four species
  - Stephanoscyphistoma (Jarms, 1990)
- Linuchidae (Haeckel, 1880)— three genera, four species
- Nausithoidae (Haeckel, 1880)— three genera, 26 species
- Paraphyllinidae (Mass, 1903)— one genus, three species
- Periphyllidae (Haeckel, 1880)— four genera, six species
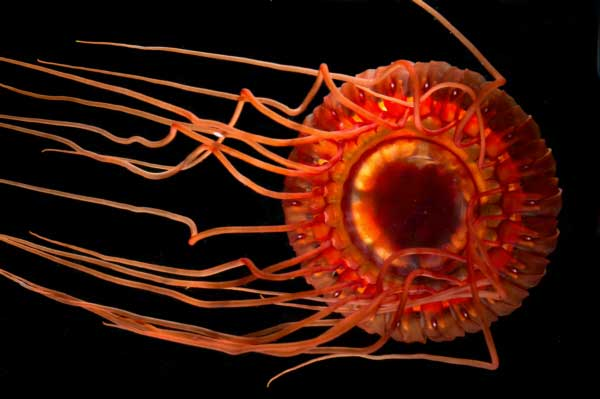
Atolla wyvillei

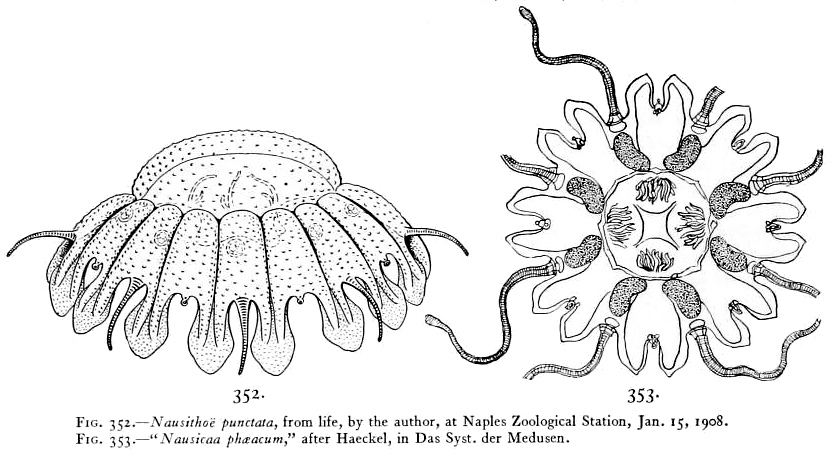
Nausithoe punctata

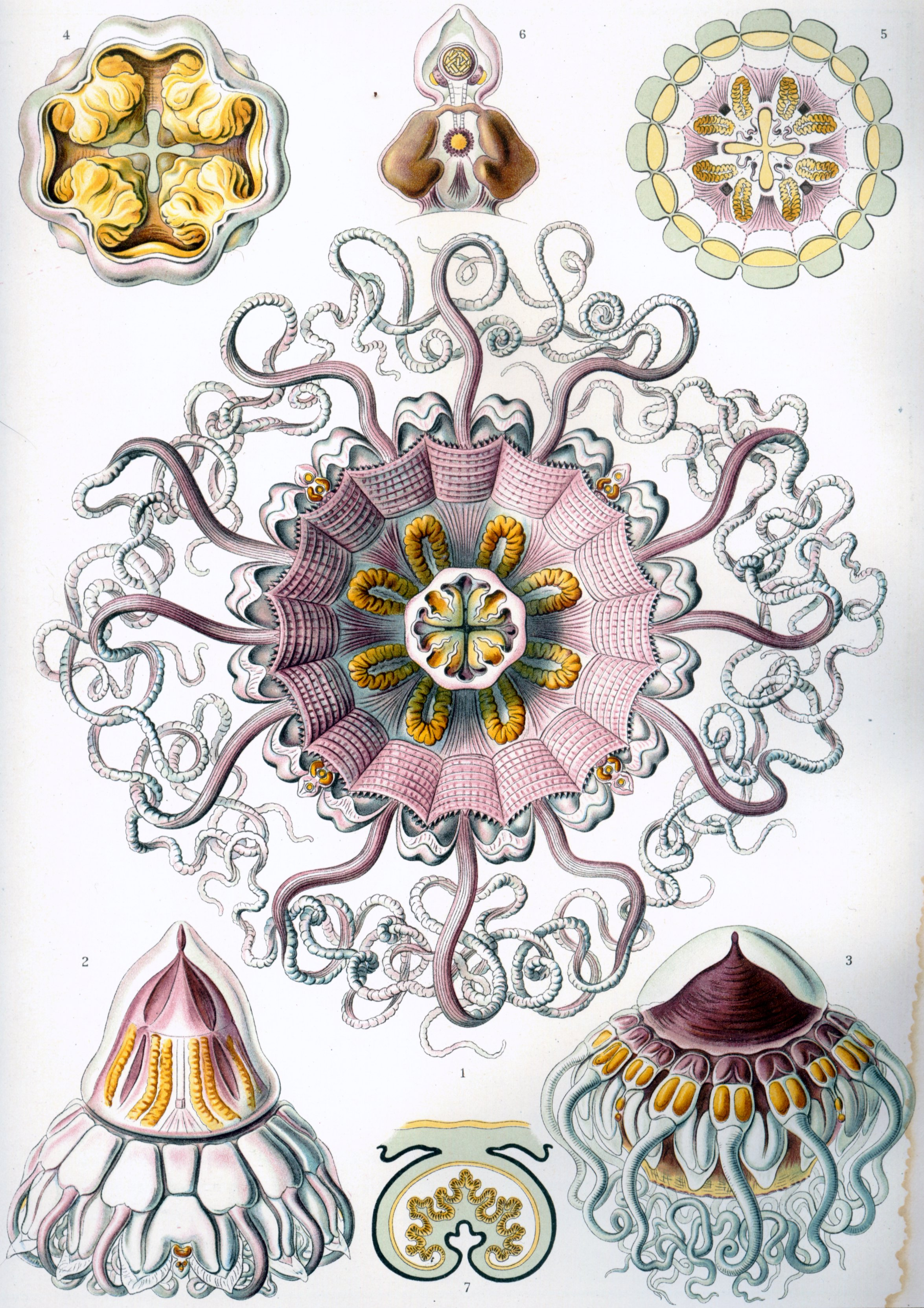
Periphylla periphylla
