= Crambione cooki =

Scientific classification
- Kingdom: Animalia
- Phylum: Cnidaria
- Class: Scyphozoa
- Order: Rhizostomeae
- Family: Catostylidae
- Genus: Crambione
- Species: C. cooki

Binomial name
- Crambione cooki Mayer, 1910

Species of jellyfish

Crambione cooki is a rare species of jellyfish in the family Catostylidae. After its original discovery and description in 1910 by Alfred Gainsborough Mayer, it was later presumed extinct, until 2013 when it was sighted off the Australian coast in Queensland. Crambione cooki was originally described as having a bell diameter of 11 centimeters and arms approximately 27cm long.
