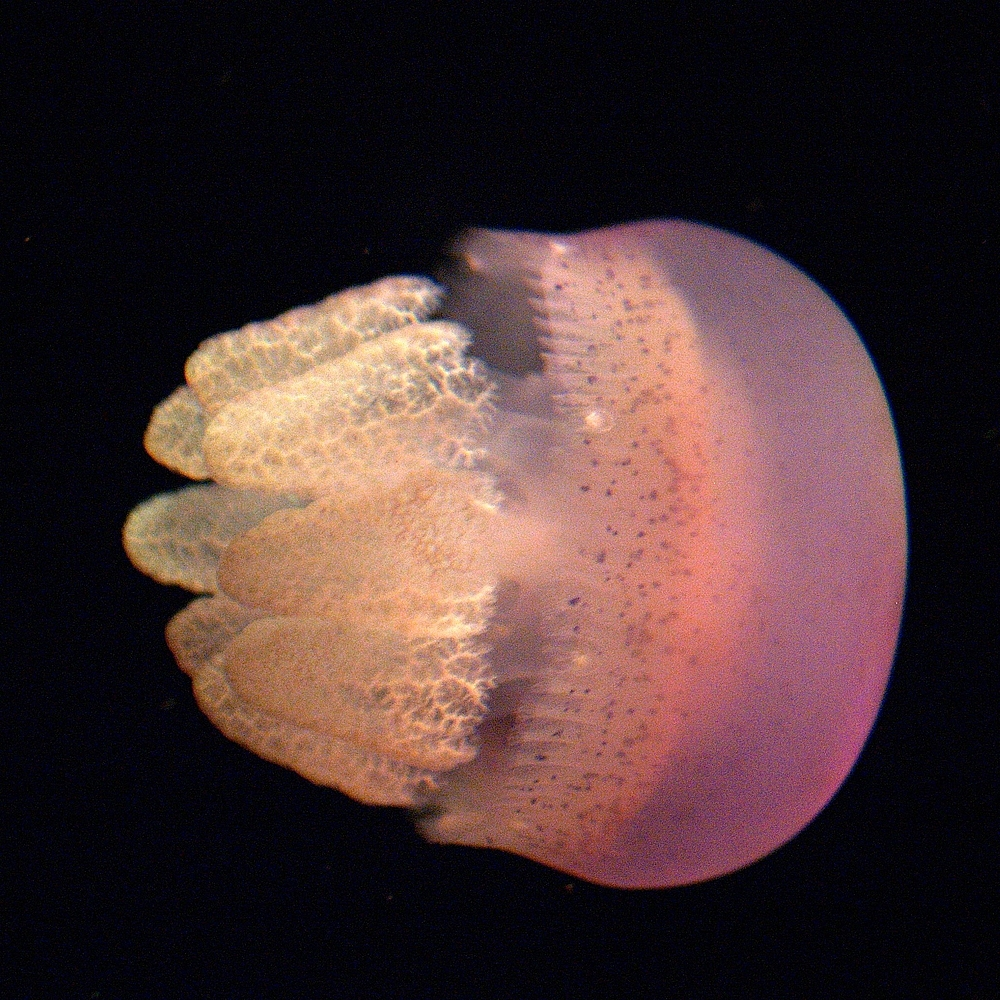

Scientific classification
- Domain: Eukaryota
- Kingdom: Animalia
- Phylum: Cnidaria
- Class: Scyphozoa
- Order: Rhizostomeae
- Family: Catostylidae
- Genus: Catostylus
- Species: C. townsendi

Binomial name
- Catostylus townsendi Mayer, 1915

= Catostylus townsendi =

Species of jellyfish

Catostylus townsendi or Marble Jelly is a species of jellyfish in the family Catostylidae. The species can be found off the coast of Borneo, and members can reach a maximum length of 10 centimeters.
