= Catostylus tagi =

- Catostylus tagi in Portugal

Scientific classification
- Kingdom: Animalia
- Phylum: Cnidaria
- Class: Scyphozoa
- Order: Rhizostomeae
- Family: Catostylidae
- Genus: Catostylus
- Species: C. tagi

Binomial name
- Catostylus tagi Haekel, 1869

Species of jellyfish

Catostylus tagi is a species of jellyfish from warmer parts of the East Atlantic Ocean and since the 2000s also found in the Mediterranean Sea. It is the only member of the family Catostylidae that is found in Europe, and it is a common species in the Tagus estuary in Portugal. It has collagen in its bell which is currently being researched to see if it has biomedical uses as an intercellular matrix. The species is named after the Tagus river.

== Description ==
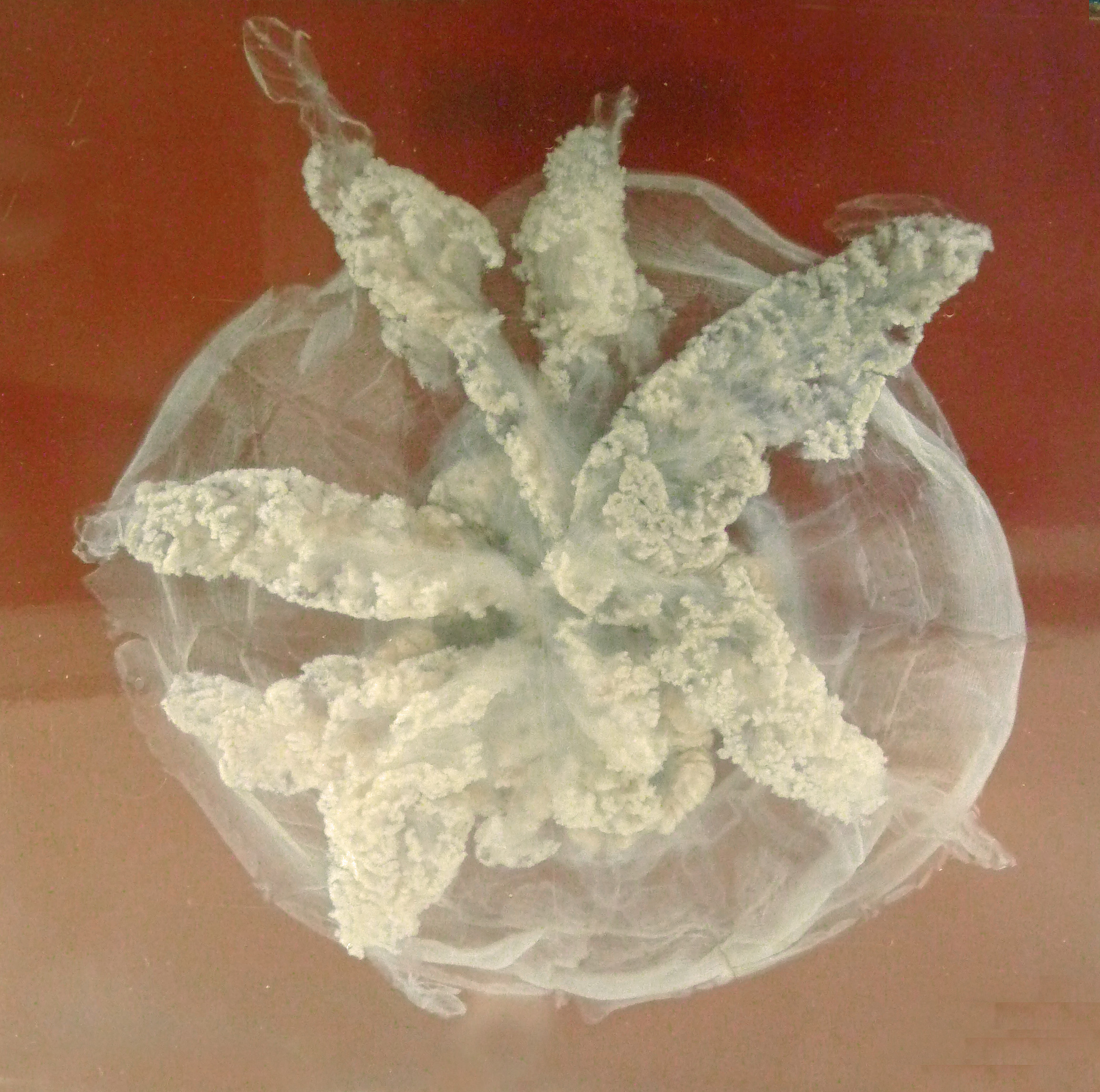
Specimen at Musée zoologique de la ville de Strasbourg

Typical Catostylus with chunky appendages and tentacle to go with each. This jellyfish has a sting that causes light pain and a skin rash, but generally poses no serious threat. It is up to 65 cm (26 in) in bell diameter, but a more typical size is 25 cm (10 in) in diameter and 2.5 kg (5.5 lb) in weight. Its colour is variable and can be blue-white, cream, brown, or off-white. The exumbrellar grooves are reddish or purplish brown. C. tagi has gonads along the edge of its stomach in an X shape. It has the octant formation typical of Catostylus jellies, the height of the octants are also variable.

== Food ==
Eats both zooplankton and phytoplankton, certain crustaceans, small fish, and marine snow.

== Biomedical use ==
Its bell collagen is currently being researched for use as an intercellular matrix. The collagen is made up of 1/3 glycine and most of the rest is water and other amino acids, its amino acid content is very small. The collagen is denatured as soon as it reaches 29.9 °C (85.8 °F).
