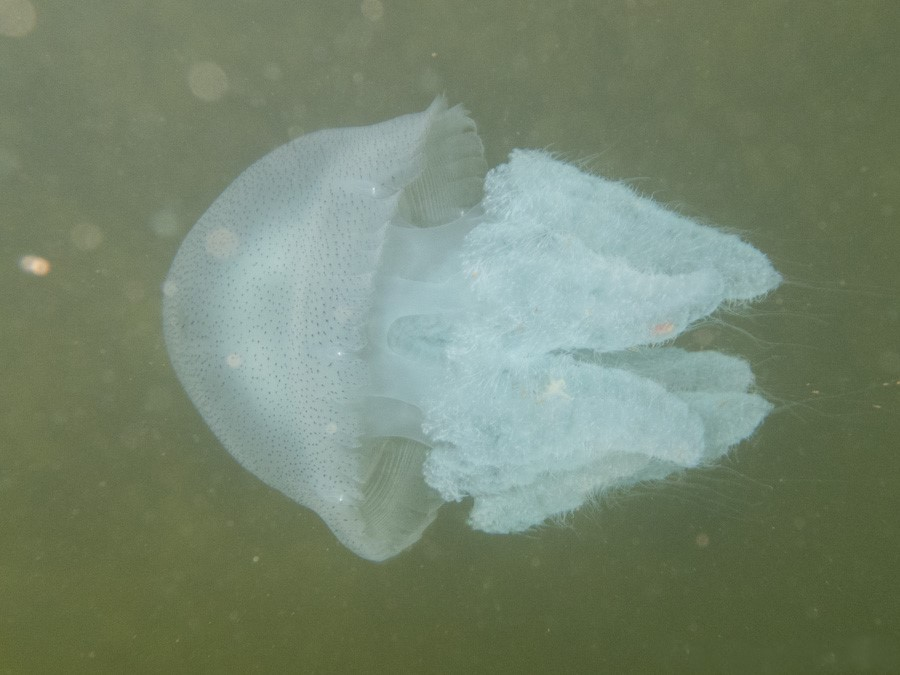

Scientific classification
- Kingdom: Animalia
- Phylum: Cnidaria
- Class: Scyphozoa
- Order: Rhizostomeae
- Family: Catostylidae
- Genus: Acromitus
- Species: A. flagellatus

Binomial name
- Acromitus flagellatus (Mass, 1903)

= Acromitus flagellatus =

Species of cnidarian

Acromitus flagellatus is a species of jellyfish in the Catostylidae family, suborder Dactyliophorae. It was discovered in 1903 by Otto Maas in the Malay Archipelago, and is closely related to Nemopilema nomurai and Rhopilema esculentum Other species in the genus Acromitus include A. hardenbergi, A. maculosus, A. rabanchatu, and A. tankahkeei. A. flagellatus get their name from their long flagellum and their oral arms that are as about as long as the diameter of their bell, while other species in the genus, like A. hardenbergi, have oral arms that are about half the length of their bell.

== Habitat ==
Acromitus flagellatus are found in brackish waters, like mangroves or estuaries, and even coasts. They've been seen in Bay of Bengal, Saptamukhi river channel, and the coastal waters of Hainan Province. They are most seen throughout the Western Indian Ocean and Central Pacific Ocean.

== Description ==
Acromitus flagellatus have an exumbrella that is 160 ± 40 mm in diameter, with uneven black or brown spots. They have eight oral arms that are about 115 ± 45 mm long with long flagellum at the end of each of them. The medusa can be white, grey, pink, or transparent. Their stings have little to no effect on humans and they exhibit sluggish movement with their contractions being very slow. Sometimes a Caranx leptolepis helps them move along.

== Life cycle ==
Acromitus flagellatus reproduces sexually and is gonochoristic. The medusa (parent) lays an egg, which develops into a planula, then scyphistoma, then strobila, and finally a medusa. They cannot eat as egg or strobila. In other words, it only eats in every second stage of its life.

== Swarms and feeding ==
The first recorded swarm of the A. flagellatus was at the Bay of Bengal. Jellyfish swarming happens because of changes in their environment, like habitat deterioration, overfishing, deep sea trawling, coastal pollution, and climate change. Since jellyfish feed off of zooplankton and ichthyoplankton, once they swarm an area, they cause a disturbance to the food web or a trophic cascade, consuming most of the primary and secondary producers. These swarms can also have a negative impact on human economic activities, like damaging fish gear, clogging nets, and decreasing fish catch. A. flagellatus swarms will most likely happen in areas of mangroves or estuaries, with forest and aquatic properties simultaneously, and two studies of these jellyfish swarms have happened during monsoon season. A. flagellatus are opportunistic feeders who will also feed on copepods and nautili, phytoplankton, ciliates, dinoflagellates, molluscan larvae, rotifers, and foraminiferans

== Anti-cancer research ==
Cancer researchers look at marine organisms for anti-cancer effects because the proteins of marine creatures have an ability to stop disease better than other organisms. They produce substances and have molecules that show pharmaceutical properties. The venom of A. flagellatus has a higher and richer amount of this protein than most, and exhibited higher anti-cancer activity on lung and liver cell lines. Another study found that gold nanoparticles with the A. flagellatus nematocyst venom residue also have anti-proliferative affects on cancer cells.
