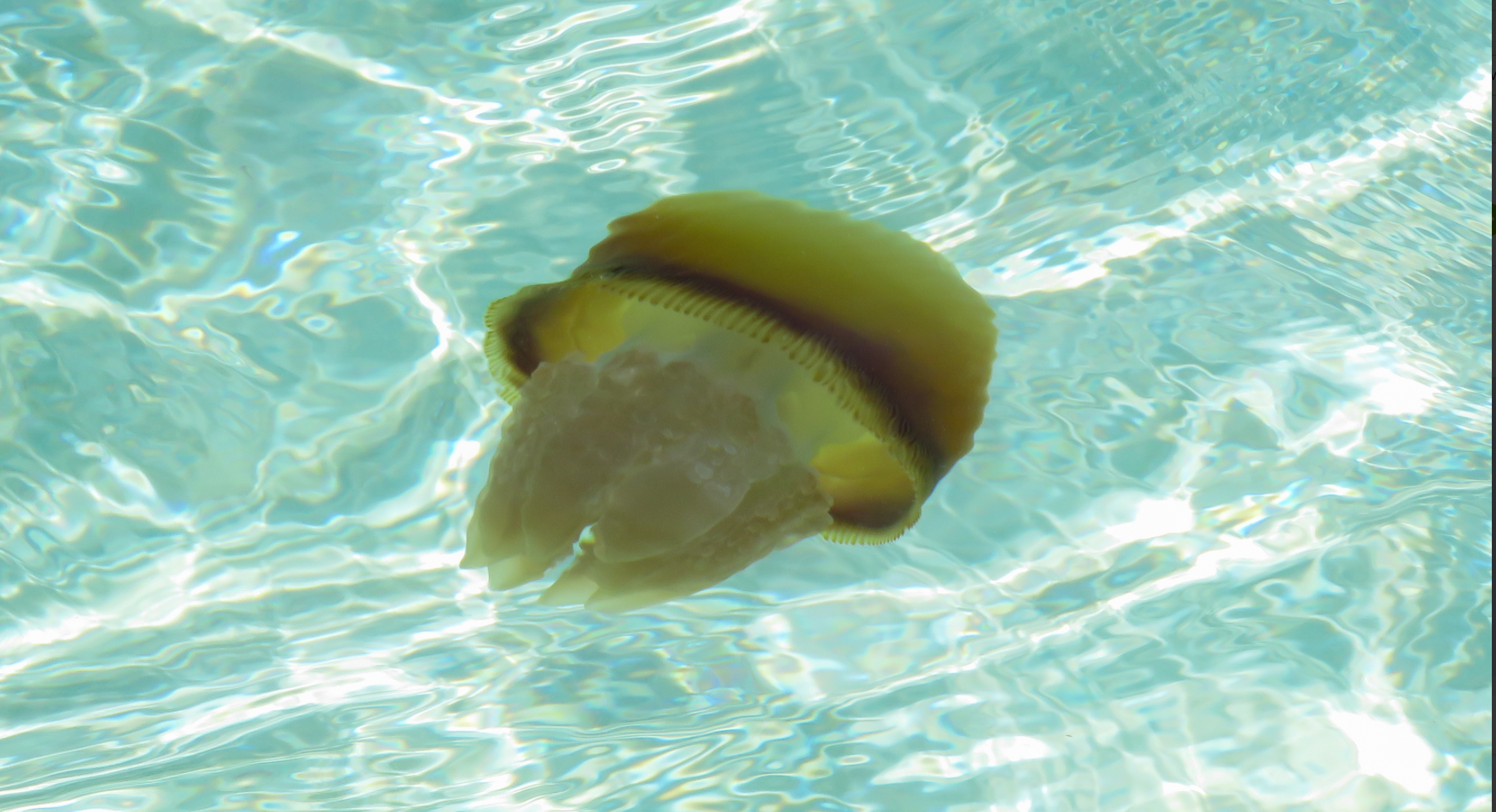
- Crambionella Orsini (Vanhöffen 1888)

Scientific classification
- Kingdom: Animalia
- Phylum: Cnidaria
- Class: Scyphozoa
- Order: Rhizostomeae
- Family: Catostylidae
- Genus: Crambionella; Stiasny, 1921

= Crambionella =

Genus of cnidarians

Crambionella is a genus of Cnidarians belonging to the family Catostylidae. The genus is distinguishable from other Castostylid species by a terminal club on each oral arm without filaments and a canal system featuring a narrow, wide-meshed intra-circular network of interconnected vessels. These vessels solely communicate with the ring canal and not with the radial canals. Four species belong to the genus Crambionella (Stiasny, 1921): C. annandalei (Rao, 1931), C. helmbiru (Nishikawa, Mulyadi & Ohtsuka, 2014), C. orsini (Vanhöffen, 1888) and C. stuhlmanni (Chun, 1896). C. orsini is the type species for the genus.

Species of Crambionella can be found throughout the Indian Ocean ranging from South Africa to Java. All 4 species can be found during the summer and winter in their respective habitats. Many nations bordering the Indian Ocean harvest Crambionella species for food, with Japan, the Philippines, Vietnam, Malaysia, Thailand, Indonesia, Singapore, and Myanmar being significant consumers.

Crambionella along with other species of jellyfish in the classes Scyphozoa, Cubozoa and Hydrozoa are integral components of marine biodiversity. Their capability to cycle nutrients and swiftly store carbon through decomposed blooms underscores their significance as a crucial component of the ocean environment. Jellyfish blooms can have negative impacts as well, particularly those of scyphozoan jellyfish. There is a link to the decline of coastal marine ecosystems, with reports of increased occurrences globally, potentially stemming from overfishing and human activities. Blooms can have negative economic impact by disrupting various industries such as commercial fisheries, tourism, and coastal power production, as seen in the significant presence of C. orsini in the Iranian fishing grounds in May 2002.

== Species ==
- Crambionella annandalei (Rao, 1931)
- Crambionella helmbiru (Nishikawa, Mulyadi & Ohtsuka, 2014)
- Crambionella orsini (Vanhöffen 1888)
- Crambionella stuhlmanni (Chun, 1896)

== Morphology ==
=== Crambionella orsini ===
The bell diameter is 100–200 mm (3.9-7.9 in). The bell is described as chocolate colored that is hard and cartilaginous. The texture of the bell feels smooth and has a shininess to it. The medusae have 9 octants; with 8 of the octants containing 16 velar lappets and 1 octant only contain 3 velar lappets. The velar lappets are sharply pointed in shape. Rhopalia is found at the juncture of each octant making nine total rhopalia. The medusae have 8 oral arms that are proportionate to the radius of the disc. The distal portion, taking up 1/4 of the oral arms, is gelatinous, pyramidal, and three winged with blunt endings.

=== Crambionella stuhlmanni ===
The umbrella diameter ranges from 62 to 181 mm (2.4-7.1 in). The bell is granular with a hemispherical shape. The medusae have eight oral arms with club shaped appendages on the distal end. In length, the oral arms are slightly shorter than the diameter of the disc radius. The terminal knob of the oral arms are blunt, pyramidal, short, and three-cornered. In nature, it exhibits transparent-white coloration, including light-brown mouthlets and appendages on the oral arms, and cream-colored gonads. It possesses eight rhopalia with twelve velar lappets per octant. The subumbrella surface contains approximately 84 annular muscles. Four crescent-shaped ostia lead from the gonadal and gastrovascular cavity. Gonadal maturity occurs at a bell diameter of 100 mm, with around half of examined specimens showing developed gonads.

=== Crambionella annandalei ===
Has an umbrella shaped, spherical head. The diameter of the head ranges from 89 to 154 mm (3.5-6 in.) and 32–94 mm (1.3-3.7 in.) in height. There are eight equidistant rhopalia with 14 bluntly pointed velar lappets in each octant. There are four genital ostia each in the shape of a crescent. The reproductive organs are light yellow. The medusae have 8 oral arms and no tentacles arising from the umbrella margin. When alive, the jellyfish is pale brown with light brown frills on the arms and transparent brown tips. After preservation, it turns pale pink or cream-colored. Crambionella annandalei has been described morphologically similar to Crambionella stuhlmanni.

=== Crambionella helmbiru ===
C. helmbiru bears resemblance to C. orsini because of the lack of tubercles on the velar lappets; however, it can be discerned from C. orsini by the presence of foliaceous appendages on the frills, which are typically absent in C. orsini. Typically, there are around 14 velar lappets per octant in C. helmbiru, but this count can vary between 12 and 18. Additionally, C. helmbiru exhibits a greater ratio of terminal club length to oral-arm length compared to C. orsini.

== Distribution ==
=== Crambionella orsini ===
C. orsini is found globally in the Red Sea, Persian Gulf, Gulf of Oman, Arabian Sea, Kenya, Mozambique Channel, West Indian Ocean, Mombasa in eastern Africa, Seychelles, Laccadive Sea, and Pakistan. Specifically, in India it has been reported to be in Madras and Gulf of Mannar of Tamil Nadu, Pondicherry, Kerala, and Agatti Island of Lakshadweep.

=== Crambionella stuhlmanni ===
C. stuhlmanni has been reported to be in the Quelimane River, South East Africa, Madagascar, and St. Lucia Estuary, South Africa. C. stuhlmanni demonstrates broad euryhaline characteristics, as it has been observed across salinity levels spanning from 12 to 65%. Its highest recorded densities are typically linked with the upper ranges of salinity. This suggests its adaptation to the fluctuating conditions present in the St. Lucia system. It is present throughout the winter (December to March) and summer (July to September) periods. The Agulhas Current and the Madagascar Current play a major role in distributing young medusae.

=== Crambionella annandalei ===
C. annandalei originates from the Andaman sea. Its range extends to the coasts of the Bay of Bengal and into the Kaladan river as well. In studies carried out along the Bay of Bengal, C. annandalei displayed marked seasonal fluctuations in both its abundance and growth rates. C. annandalei inhabits the waters during the summer and the first two months of the pre-monsoon season. During the monsoon and post-monsoon seasons, C. annandalei are scarce or completely absent. The reason behind the observable seasonal patterns remains unclear, though it is theorized that they arise from regional and local circulation patterns as well as the inherent life cycle of the species.

=== Crambionella helmbiru ===
C. helmbiru resides in the coastal waters of Java in the Indian Ocean. It is found in bloom during both summer and winter (August–December).

== Commercial Fishing Aspects ==
Rhizostomeae is widely consumed due to their larger size and sturdier bodies compared to other scyphozoans. These jellyfish have substantial, tough bodies with thick umbrellas, resulting in a desirable crunchy texture when processed. C. annandalei is caught in the largest quantities in the Andhra Pradesh state of India, and is one of the main supporters of the commercial jellyfish industry in the region. In the region, C. annandalei is called 'Munthakaya' (in the language Telugu). In India, the harvesting of edible jellyfish began in 1980, with the primary goal being exportation of the jellyfish. Catching these jellyfish offers small-scale fishermen an additional income, accounting for approximately 20–25% of their annual earnings. Local fisherman catch C. annandalei using gillnets strung at a depth of 50 m or less from the back of boats. C. annadalei is the most harvested of the 3 commercial species of Crambionella. Given its status as an edible species consumed in multiple Asian nations, C. annandalei represents a promising resource deserving of further investigation and exploration.

C. orsini is included among this group of popular edible jellyfish. C. orsini is greatly prized for its nutritional value and gourmet appeal, especially in nations across Southeast Asia.

Both species are found for sale in markets of the nations Japan, Philippines, Vietnam, Malaysia, Thailand, Indonesia, Singapore, and Myanmar.

== Jellyfish Blooming ==
Jellyfish blooms are frequently associated with the deterioration of coastal marine ecosystems in scientific discourse. Specifically, scyphozoan jellyfish stand out due to their notable size and capacity to create dense blooms during specific times of the year. Lately, there have been more frequent reports of jellyfish blooms occurring in various regions globally. Some suggest that this uptick in occurrences could be linked to overfishing and other human activities disrupting marine ecosystems. Additionally, jellyfish blooms disrupt commercial fisheries, tourism, and coastal power production, leading to predominantly negative effects on these industries and ecosystems.

In the initial weeks of May 2002, fishermen along the western shore of Gwatar Bay noticed a significant presence of the medium-sized brown jellyfish, C. orsini. It appeared that C. orsini was also prevalent in the coastal waters of the Gulf of Oman. The reported consequences of this bloom included reduced catches in both artisanal and industrial fisheries, damage to fishing equipment, disruptions in the functioning of desalination plants, and impairment of seawater cooling systems used by coastal power plants.
