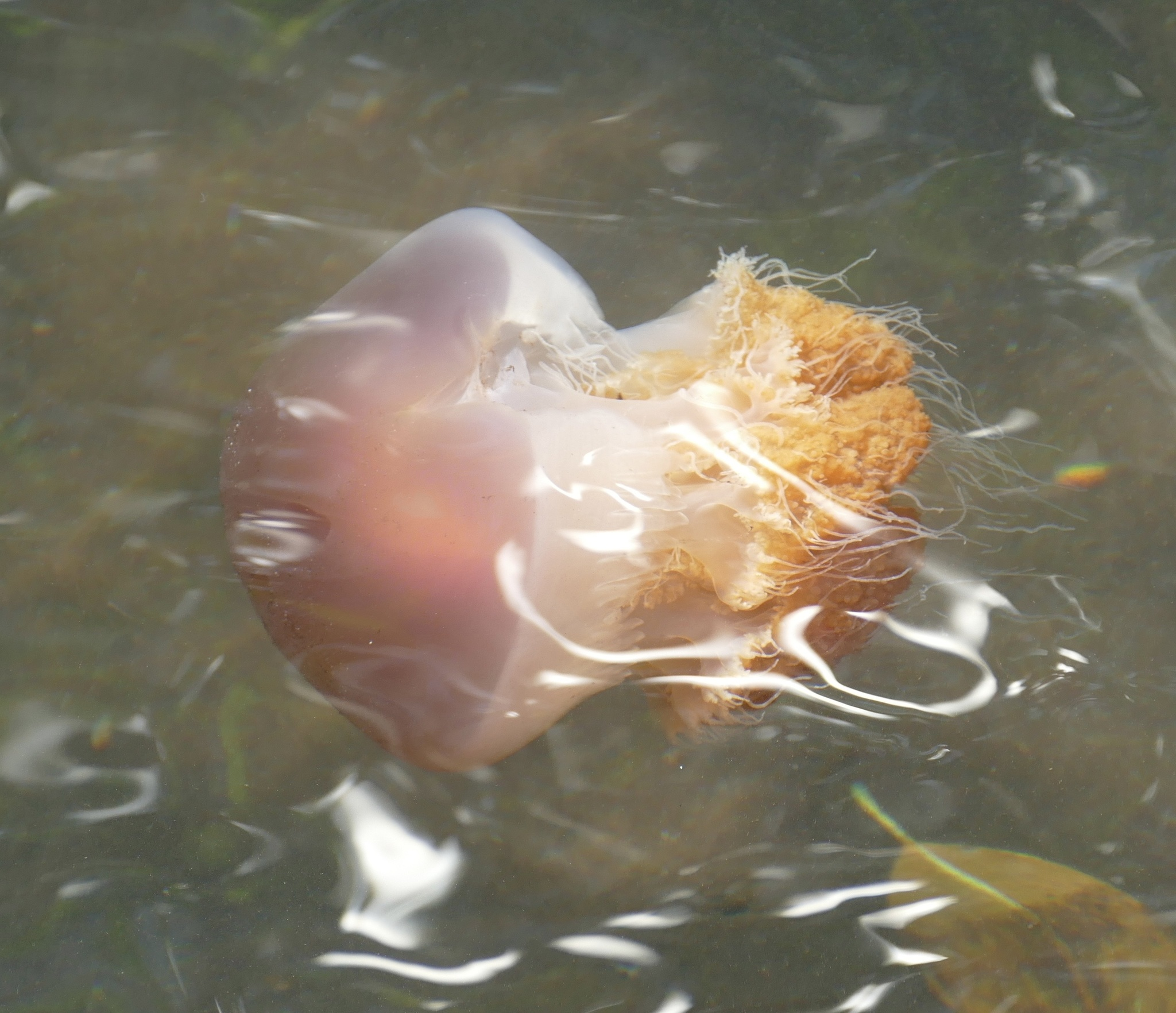
- Crambione mastigophora

Scientific classification
- Kingdom: Animalia
- Phylum: Cnidaria
- Class: Scyphozoa
- Order: Rhizostomeae
- Family: Catostylidae
- Genus: Crambione; Maas, 1903

Species
- Crambione bartschi (Mayer, 1910); Crambione cooki Mayer, 1910; Crambione mastigophora Maas, 1903

= Crambione =

Genus of jellyfishes

Crambione is a genus of jellyfish in the family Catostylidae.
