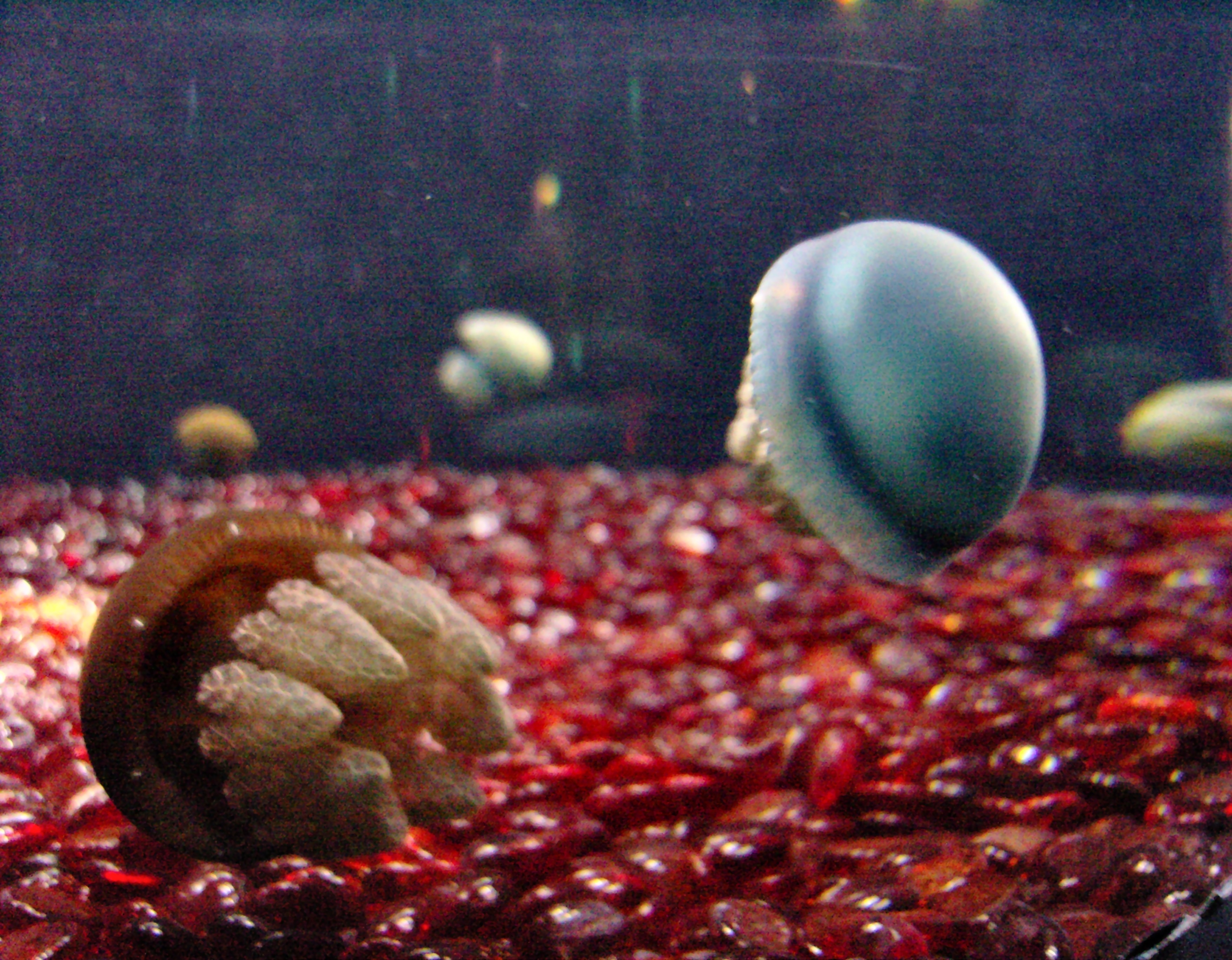
- Two color morphs on display at the Monterey Bay Aquarium

Scientific classification
- Kingdom: Animalia
- Phylum: Cnidaria
- Class: Scyphozoa
- Order: Rhizostomeae
- Family: Catostylidae
- Genus: Catostylus
- Species: C. mosaicus

Binomial name
- Catostylus mosaicus Quoy & Gaimard, 1824

= Jelly blubber =

Species of jellyfish

Catostylus mosaicus, also known as the jelly blubber or blue blubber jellyfish, is a species of jellyfish of the order Rhizostomeae. The jelly blubber is distinguishable by its colour, which ranges from light blue to a dark blue or purple, and its large (250–300 mm (9.8–11.8 in)), rounded bell which pulses in a staccato rhythm. It occurs along the coastline of Eastern Australia in estuaries and shallow bays, and often blooms to high abundance.

== Morphology ==
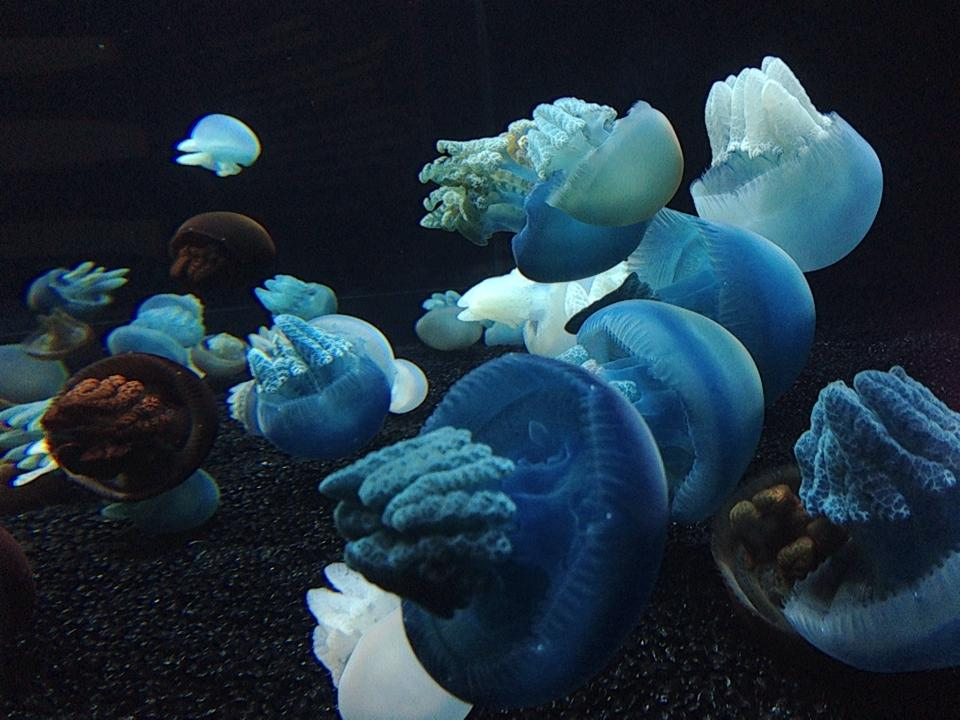
Blubber jellyfish at the Monterey Bay Aquarium's "Jellyfish Experience"

Catostylus mosaicus is a member of the class Scyphozoa and order Rhizostomae, which are distinguishable by the lack of tentacles. Instead, their bodies are composed of four oral lobes and eight arms that attach at the centre of the bell. The bell of the jelly blubber is spherical in shape, and its feeding structures make up a greater proportion of its body than in many other species of jellyfish. Because of their unique body shape, C. mosaicus are known to utilise jet propulsion, triggered by the contracting and relaxing patterns of their bell.

Stinging nematocyst cells are located on the arms of C. mosaicus, which are utilised for defence as well as to immobilise prey. Because they vary between species, they are often used for species identification. Different types of nematocysts are specialised to catch different types of prey, and may be a causal factor for the specialised diets seen in jellyfish Catolystus mosaicus have four different types of nematocysts (Oval Isorhizae, pear-shaped Isorhizae, Rhopaloids, and Birhopaloids), distributed in relatively high abundance, that allow them to capture prey and defend themselves.

There are thought to be two monophyletic clades of Catostylus mosaicus found in Eastern Australia: C. mosaicus mosaicus and C. mosaicus conservitus, which have differences in mitochondrial DNA, colour, as well as morphology such as general proportions and bell depth. C mosaicus mosaicus is found in New South Wales and southern Queensland, and can be distinguished due to their small or nonexistent papillae and larger bell diameter. C. mosaicus conservitus occupies the Bass Strait and can be distinguished by conspicuous papillae, blue or white colour, and smaller bell.

== Habitat ==
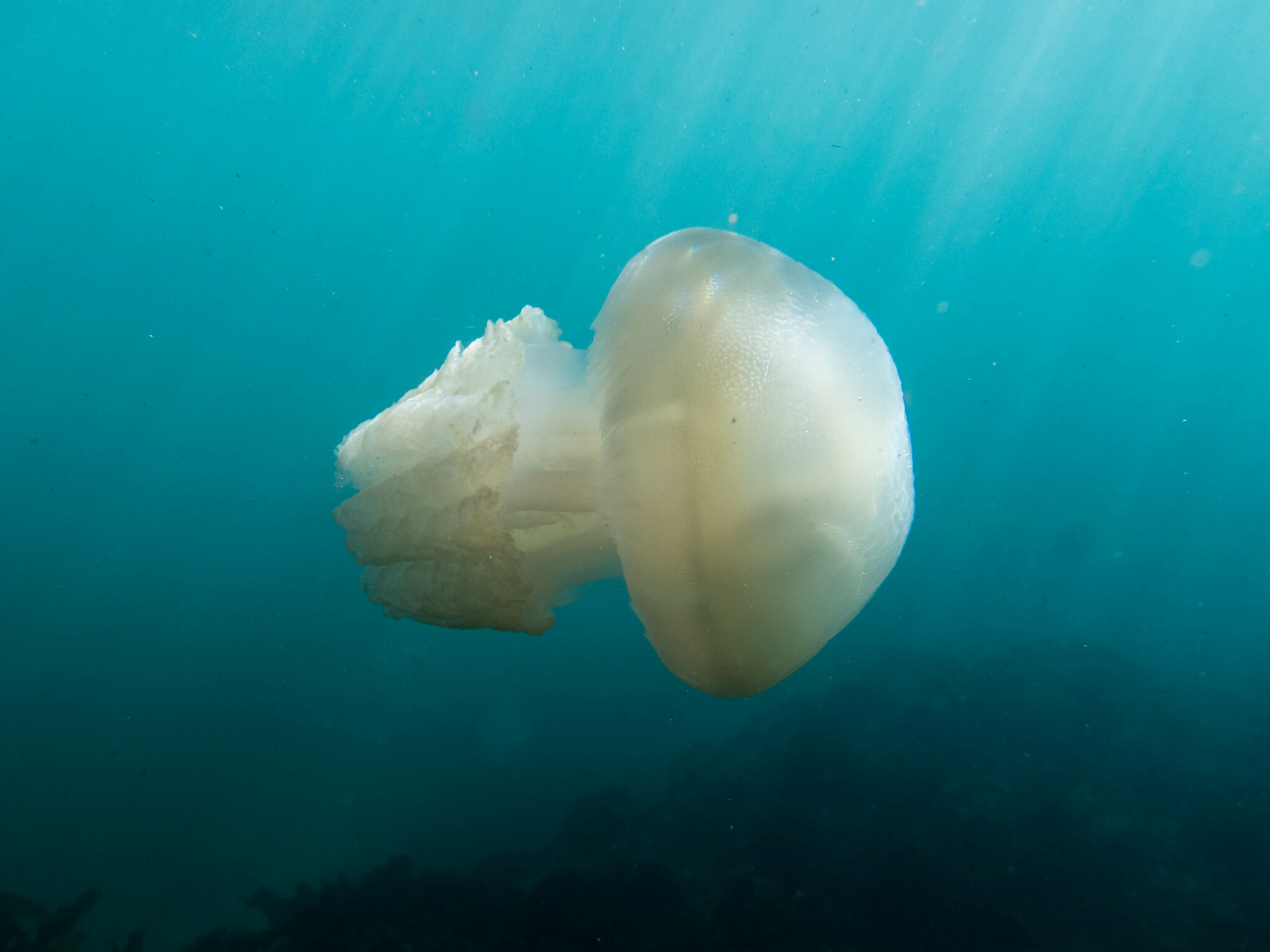
Blue jelly blubber off the coast of Randwick, Australia

Catostylus mosaicus is the most common large medusae along the coastline of Eastern Australia, and can be found along the Malay Peninsula. They inhabit estuaries, semi-enclosed lagoons, and shallow bays, and can form large, dense blooms. C. mosaicus thrive in high salinity environments, and events of lowered salinity can inhibit planula settlement and impair feeding ability of medusae. Additionally, rapid changes in salinity can impair osmoregulation, causing the jellyfish to swell or shrink rapidly. As a result, C. mosaicus resides predominantly in higher salinity areas of estuaries.

== Ecology ==
Catostylus mosaicus feeds primarily on zooplankton, specifically mollusc veligers along with copepods and their nauplii. They generally capture fewer gelatinous zooplankton, as well as later, more developed stages of fish larvae and crab megalopae, as these animals are better able to evade capture. C. mosaicus can form large blooms in the regions it inhabits, which can affect both their competition as well as their zooplankton prey. These blooms can negatively impact zooplankton which are consumed at higher rates or forced to expend more energy to avoid capture, leading to limitations in feeding and survival. In addition, competition with C. mosaicus for food may lead to declines in populations for competitors such as fish.

C. mosaicus populations are controlled by predation by sea turtles as well as jellyfish-eating fish, including tuna, butterfish, sunfish, and spiny dogfish

C. mosaicus are able to recycle inorganic nutrients, providing nutrition for primary producers. Due to lower amounts of symbiotic photosynthetic zooxanthellae, C. mosaicus is able to recycle higher amounts of inorganics than many other estuarine-dwelling Scyphozoa.

=== Symbiosis ===
Catostylus mosaicus are known to have a symbiotic relationship with photosynthetic algae. This algae lives within the host and uses the sun to produce energy for itself as well as its C. mosaicus host. This energy makes up a small proportion of the diet of the jellyfish, and C. mosaicus is known to have less of this symbiotic zooxanthellae than many other Scyphozoa. Catostylus mosaicus are also known to have relationships with other species, including fishes, spider crabs, shrimp, phyllosoma larvae, portunid crabs, and amphipods. A commensal relationship with the copepod species Paramacrochiron maximum has been observed, which exists in high abundance on the oral arms of the jellyfish. It is thought that the copepod consumes mucus produced by its jellyfish host.

== Reproduction and life history ==
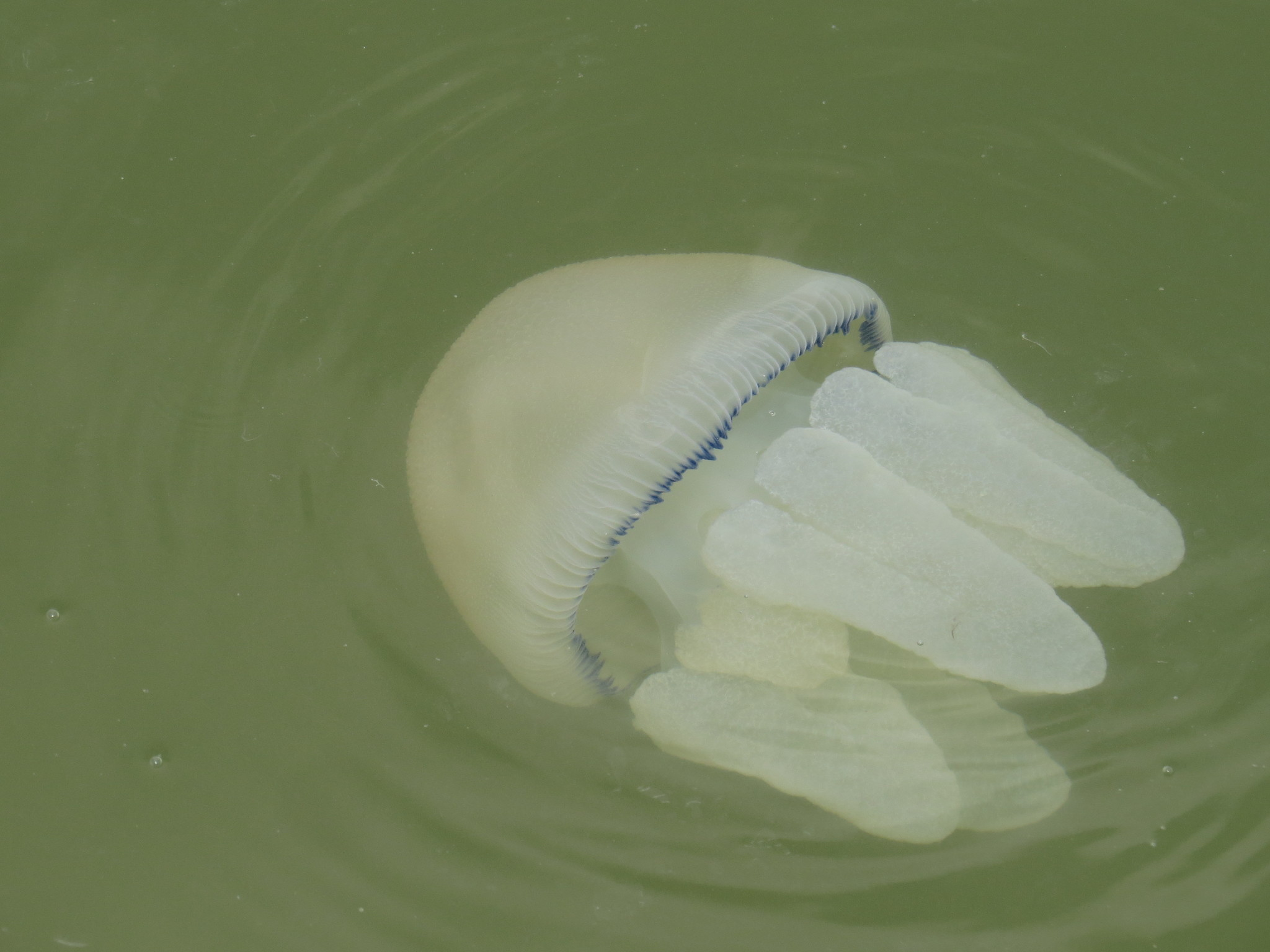
Blue blubber jelly off the coast of Koumala, Australia

The life cycle of catostylus moscaicus is similar to that of other members of the order Rhizostomeae. These jelly blubbers alternate life stages between a sexually reproducing free-swimming medusae stage and an asexually reproducing benthic polyp stage. The polyp stage reproduces asexually, while the medusa stage of C. mosaicus reproduces sexually. The medusae are gonochoristic, with a 1:1 ratio of female to male. After fertilisation, the eggs of C. mosaicus develop into elongated, pelagic planula larvae and settle to the benthos to develop into their polyp stage. The polyp reproduces asexually through strobilation which produces an ephyra, a juvenile stage that matures into the medusa

== Human interactions ==
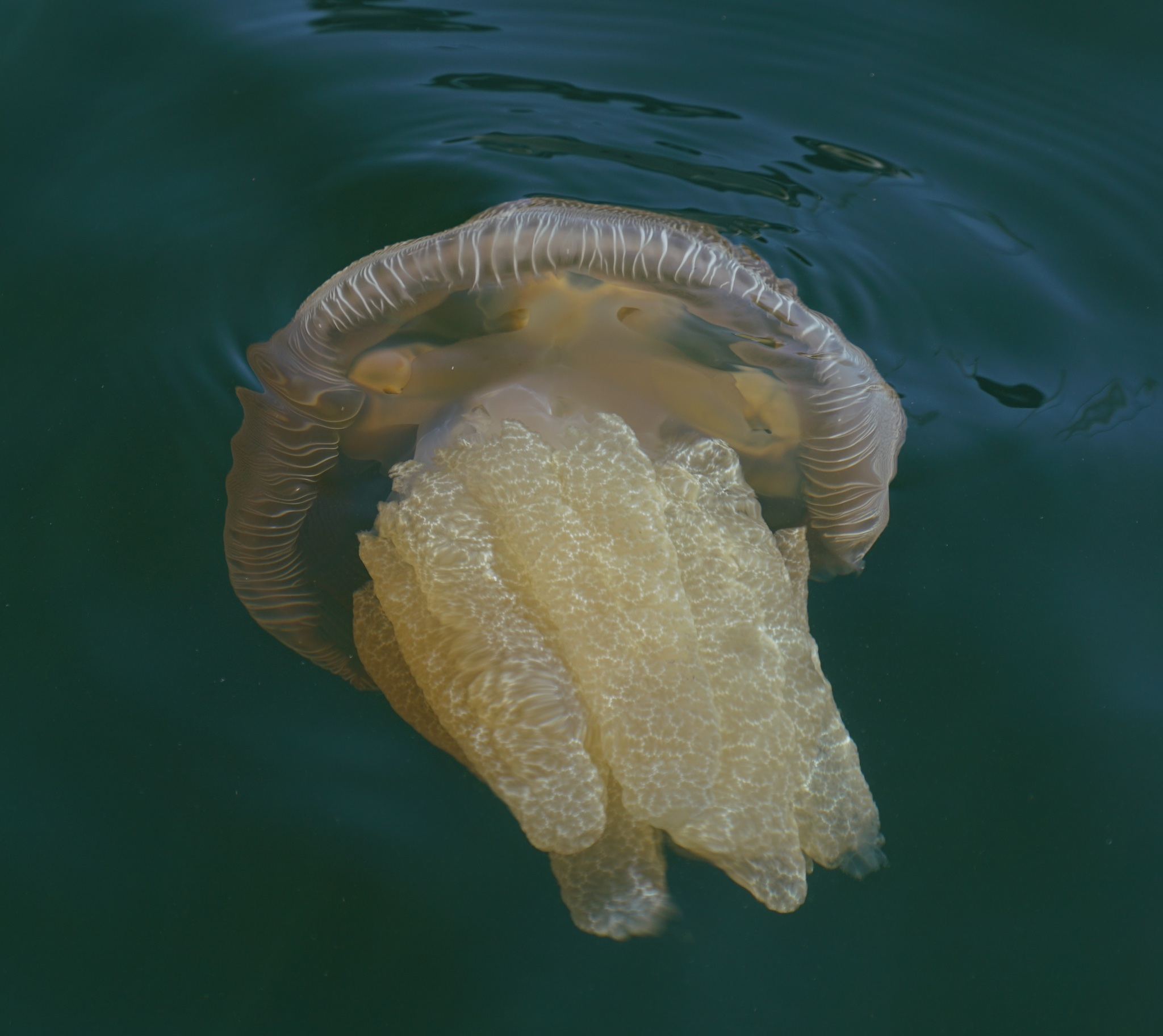
Blue blubber jelly in Ku-ring-gai Chase National Park, Australia

Catostylus mosaicus and humans influence one another in a few different ways. Large blooms of jellyfish in coastal areas can interrupt recreation and their arms may produce a mild but irritating sting. Due to their size and high abundance, C. mosaicus is harvested for human consumption, and is considered a delicacy in some countries, including China and Japan.

Finally, the venom of C. mosaicus and other Scyphozoans is being investigated in terms of potential anticancer effects. The cnidocytes of C. mosaicus hold venom which may have apoptopic effects on A549 cells, the same cells linked to pulmonary adenocarcinoma, a common form of lung cancer. Further study and isolation of these cnidocytes may lead to anticancer innovations.
