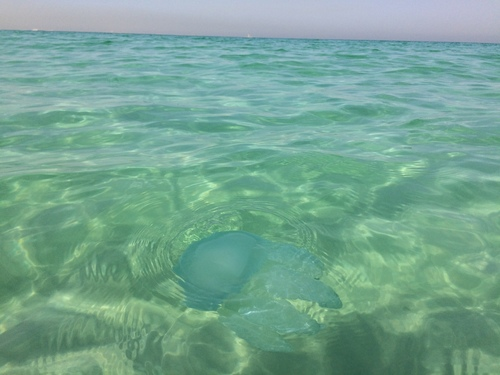
- Catostylus perezi, also known as banana jellyfish, floating through the ocean near Asia

Scientific classification
- Kingdom: Animalia
- Phylum: Cnidaria
- Class: Scyphozoa
- Order: Rhizostomeae
- Family: Catostylidae
- Genus: Catostylus
- Species: C. perezi

Binomial name
- Catostylus perezi Ranson, 1945

= Catostylus perezi =

Species of jellyfish

Catostylus perezi, commonly known as the banana jellyfish, is a jellyfish in the family Catostylidae.

== Description ==
Catostylus perezi has a smooth domed bell that is 147 mm in diameter and around eight sensory structures called rhopalia. The jellyfish also presents eight oral arms that can grow up to 85 mm long. When alive, the color of the jellyfish ranges from blue to transparent, but when preserved, it turns a creamy white color. This jellyfish is distinguished from other groups because it lacks appendages around its bell-shaped area. Catostylus perezi has been observed in the coastal waters of the Southern Arabian Peninsula and Persian Gulf region.

== Behavior and ecology ==
Catostylus perezi move by thrusting their bell, which creates propulsion to help them get through the water. Due to having no control over which direction they go, they are passive feeders, feeding primarily on zooplankton and fish larvae using their oral arms. Though the jellyfish's sting is not harmful to humans, it does have nematocysts used to help aid in capturing prey and defending itself from predators. This species has shown to be very hardy with studies showing them being able to adapt to different environment changes. A 2022 study found that a mass jellyfish bloom would occur near power plants and ports that emit increased temperature waters, nutrient availability, and low predation. This suggests that the Catostylus perezi can easily adapt to different environments, which leads to their high abundance and popularity in fisheries.

== Distribution and habitat ==
Catostylus perezi can be found in the Persian Gulf and the Arabian Sea just off the coast of Pakistan. They are particularly found at Keti Bunder, Bhanbore, and Mirpur Sakro for about 6–8 months. They prefer warmer waters and shallow areas close to nutrient runoff. Catostylus perezi has also been spotted at the Main Outfall Drain Channel in Iraq.

== Human interactions ==
The Catostylus perezi sting is harmless, posing zero threat to humans. The Banana jellyfish is beneficial in other countries, such as Pakistani, where food is limited. A study found that this jellyfish contained a large amount of nutrients, making it edible to humans and helping support malnutrition communities. Due to their high abundance, the Banana jellyfish is fished off the Balochistan coast of Pakistan, where their oral arms are used for biological compounds and food. The mucin that comes off the jellyfish has been found to help aid in the relief of joint pain. Once a year, about 2,500 million Catostylus perezi and Rhopilema hispidum are harvested from the Pakistan area.
