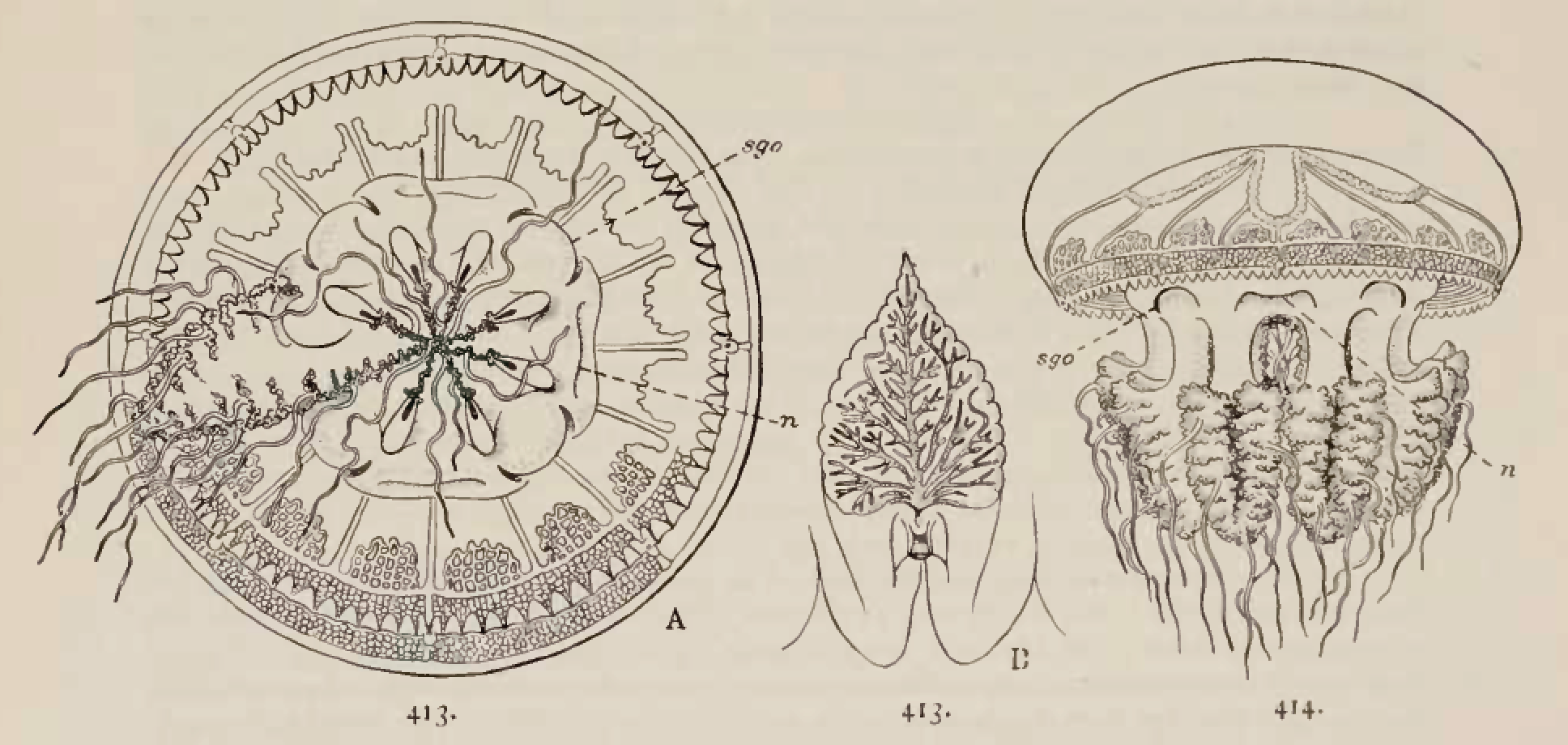

Scientific classification
- Domain: Eukaryota
- Kingdom: Animalia
- Phylum: Cnidaria
- Class: Scyphozoa
- Order: Rhizostomeae
- Family: Catostylidae
- Genus: Crambione
- Species: C. bartschi

Binomial name
- Crambione bartschi Mayer, 1910

Synonyms
- Lychnorhiza bartschi Mayer, 1910

= Crambione bartschi =

Species of jellyfish

Crambione bartschi is a species of jellyfish in the family Catostylidae. It is found in the Philippines, and grows to 7.4 centimetres (~2.9 inches) wide. When originally described, it was placed in the genus Lychnorhiza, but was moved to Crambione in 1921.
