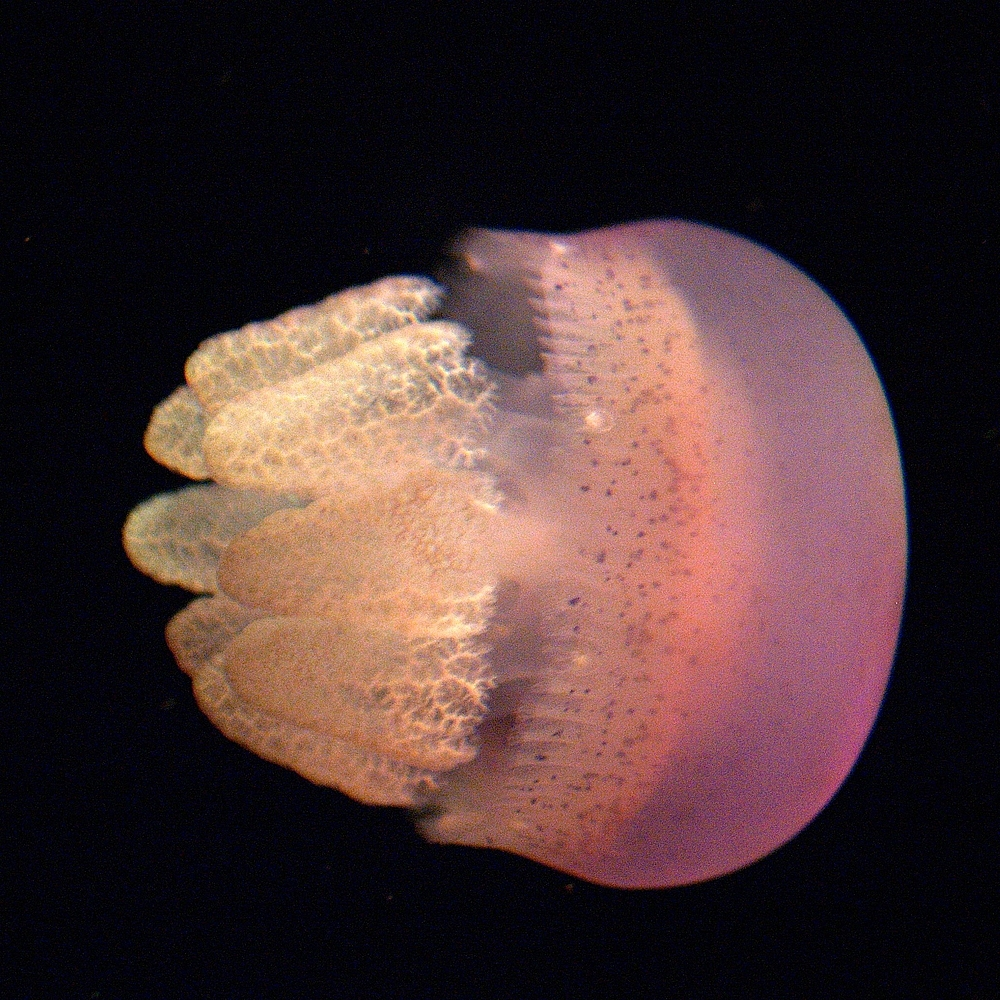
- Catostylus townsendi

Scientific classification
- Kingdom: Animalia
- Phylum: Cnidaria
- Class: Scyphozoa
- Order: Rhizostomeae
- Family: Catostylidae
- Genus: Catostylus; Agassiz, 1862

= Catostylus =

Genus of jellyfishes

Catostylus is a genus of jellyfish in the family Catostylidae.

== Species ==
The following species are recognized in the genus Catostylus.

- Catostylus cruciatus (Lesson, 1830)
- Catostylus mosaicus (Quoy & Gaimard)
- Catostylus ornatellus (Vanhöffen, 1888)
- Catostylus ouwensi Moestafa & McConnaughey, 1966
- Catostylus perezi Ranson, 1945
- Catostylus purpurus Mayer, 1910
- Catostylus tagi (Haeckel, 1869)
- Catostylus townsendi Mayer, 1915
- Catostylus tripterus (Haeckel, 1880)
- Catostylus turgescens (Schulze, 1911)
- Catostylus viridescens (Chun, 1896)
