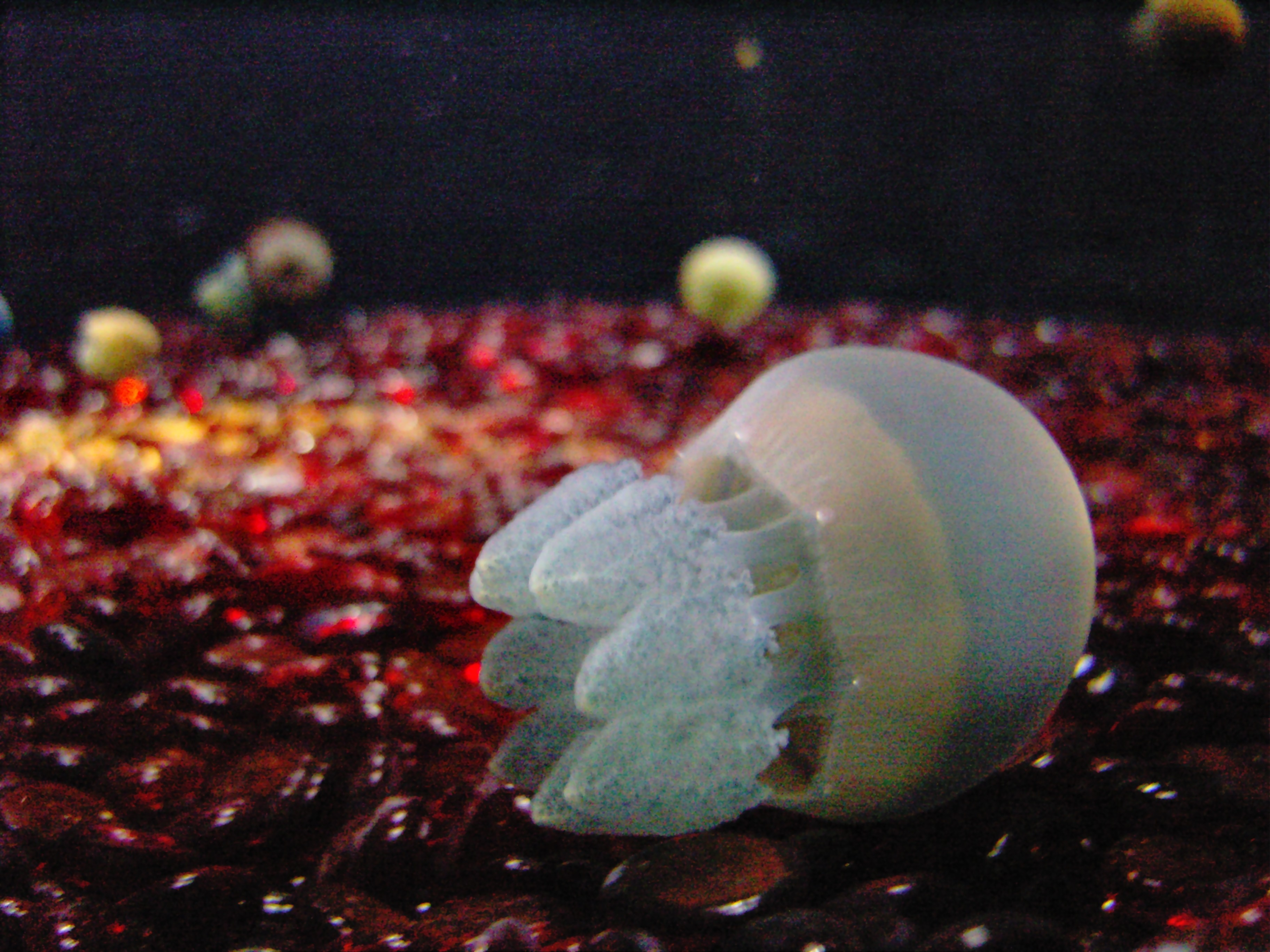
- Catostylus mosaicus, blubber jellyfish

Scientific classification
- Kingdom: Animalia
- Phylum: Cnidaria
- Class: Scyphozoa
- Order: Rhizostomeae
- Suborder: Dactyliophorae
- Family: Catostylidae; Gegenbaur, 1857

Genera
- See text

= Catostylidae =

Family of jellyfishes

Catostylidae, the fat-arm jellies, is a family of jellyfish. Members of this family are characterized by their thick, sausage-like oral arms. Members of the family Catostylidae are small marine jellyfish with domed bells. The eight short oral arms are broad and three-sided. These jellies do sting but usually only leave minor burns.

== Biology ==
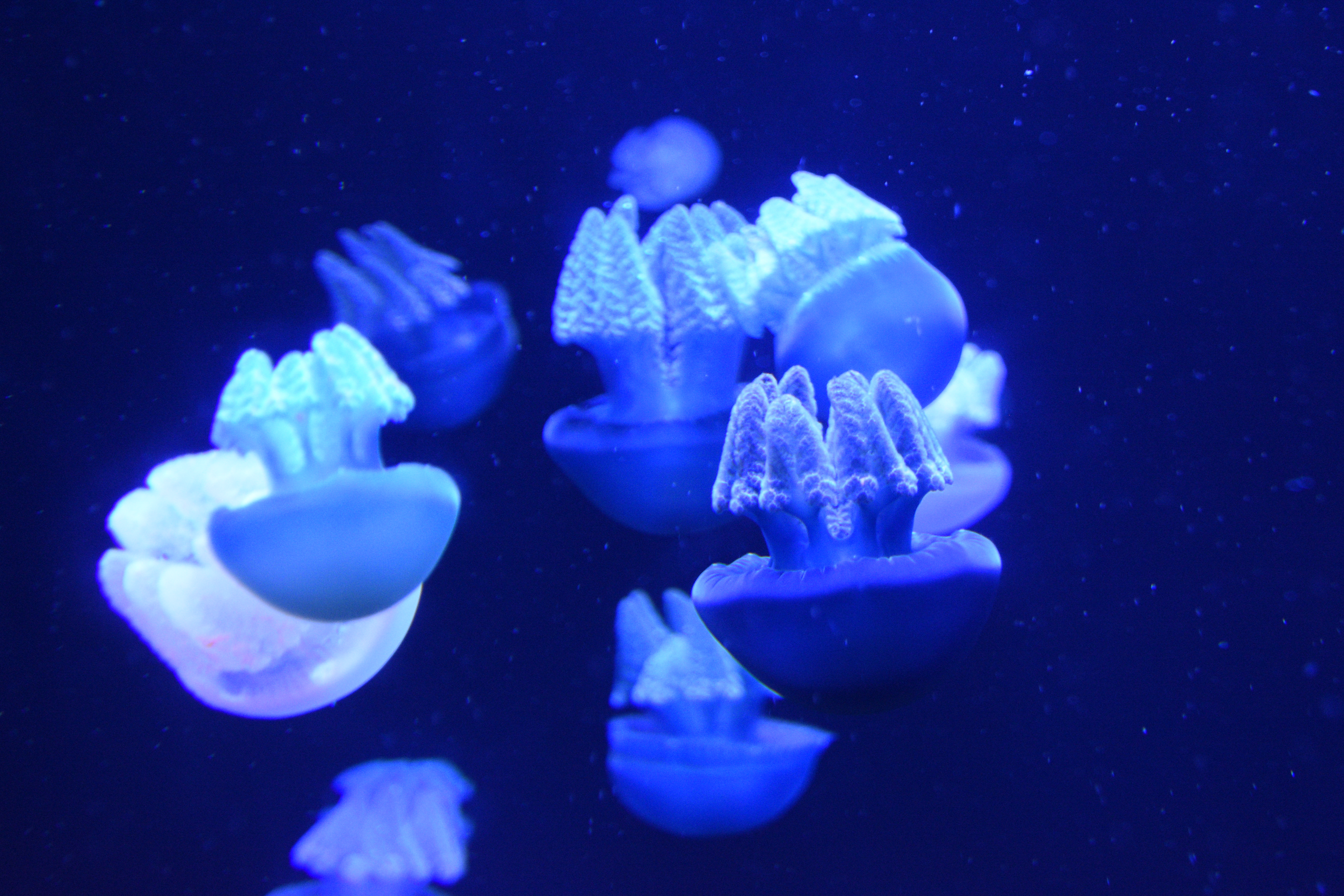
Catostylus mosaicus (Blue Blubber Jelly)

These jellyfish have 3 layers that make up their bodies. They have an inner gastrodermis that comprises the digestive cavity. The gastrodermis possesses a single opening that functions as a mouth and an anus. The middle layer is called the mesoglea; a jelly-like substance that is flexible and dense. The outermost layer is the epidermis; it contains the nerve net. There is a network of branching canals linked with the primary ring canal, but these are not joined to the gastrovascular cavity except through the sixteen or thirty two radial canals. Some of these radial canals do not extend to the edge of the bell. There are eight sense organs, known as rhopalia, which have canals extending to the margin of the bell. Numerous jellyfish in this family rely on zooplankton as a primary source of substance.

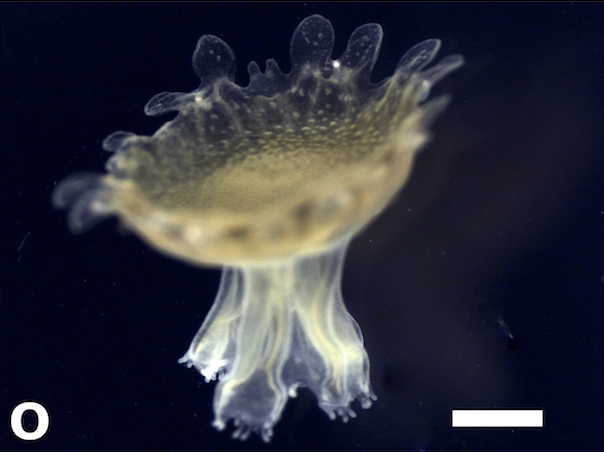
Ephyra stage of development

These jellyfish swim in jerks by contracting their circular and radial muscles, which decreases the volume of water enclosed under the bell, before relaxing them again and repeating the sequence. They have no control over the direction of locomotion and drift with the currents and tides. They come in many different colors the most common are brown, clear, and blue. They are found around Africa, Australia, Spain, and South Asia. A few have also been spotted near the equator in the Americas. Sunfish, tuna, spiny dogfish, and sea turtles feed on many jellyfish of the Catostylidae family.

Catostylidae jellyfish go through six stages in their life cycle. They go between both asexual (polypoid) and sexual (medusoid) generations. Their life cycle progresses from planula to scyphistoma to podocyst to strobila to ephyra, culminating finally in the medusa stage.

== History ==
Catostylidae was first mentioned in 1883 by Carl Claus is his book Untersuchungen über die Organisation und Entwicklung der Medusen.

=== Evolution ===
Within their phylum, Cnidarian, their eyes emerged separately on a minimum of eight occasions. Furthermore, the evolutionary trajectory of complex, lensed eyes diverge from other eye variations. Additionally, light-sensing behavior seems prevalent among them lacking eyes, indicating that their ancestors likely possessed scattered photoreceptor cells with light-detecting capabilities.

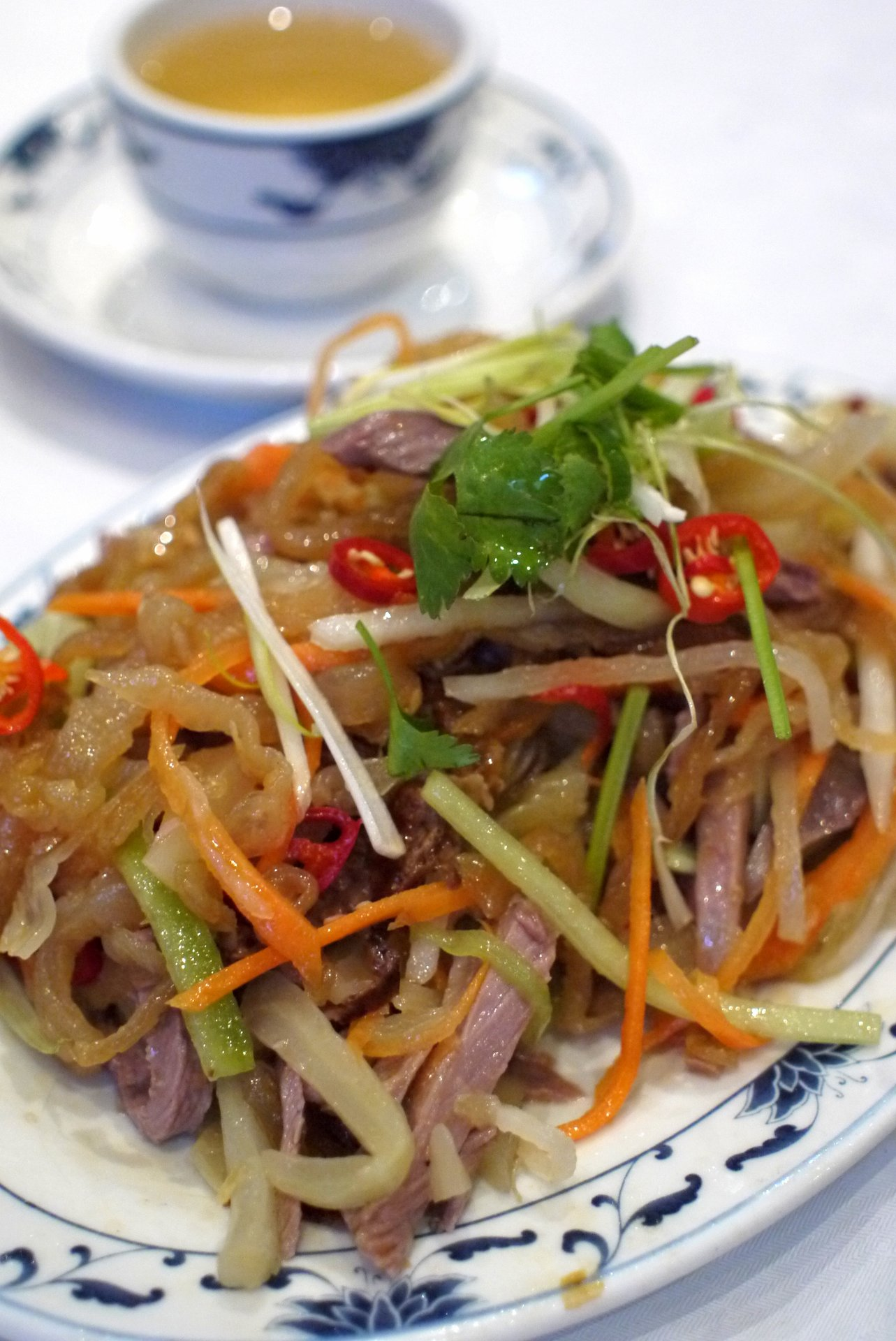
Jellyfish Salad

=== Culture ===
In numerous ancient Chinese cultures, Catostylidae jellyfish have served as a great food source. During their medusa stage, the umbrellas of these jellyfish become edible due to them beginning to create collagen. They offer minimal carbohydrates and saturated fats in their composition, creating an alternative to traditional proteins. This tradition of including cooked jellyfish umbrellas in salads has spread throughout various Asian countries including Japan, Thailand, and Malaysia. Moreover, in recent years, some European nations have begun to explore this culinary practice as well.

=== Taxonomy ===
There are six known genera and twenty-one known species of Catostylidae. Limited information exists regarding all species within the Catostylidae family, primarily because some inhabit deep ocean environment, making them challenging to access for study. The ones that are seen are the ones that wash up on shore due to drifting with the ocean currents.

== Genera ==
- Acromitoides
  - Acromitoides purpurus (Mayer, 1910)
  - Acromitoides stiphropterus (Schultze, 1897)
- Acromitus
  - Acromitus flagellatus (Haeckel)
  - Acromitus maculosus (Light, 1914)
- Catostylus
  - Catostylus cruciatus (Lesson, 1830)
  - Catostylus mosaicus (Quoy & Gaimard, 1824)
  - Catostylus ornatellus (Vanhöffen, 1888)
  - Catostylus ouwensi (Moestafa & McConnaughey, 1966)
  - Catostylus perezi (Ranson, 1945)
  - Catostylus tagi (Haeckel, 1869)
  - Catostylus townsendi (Mayer, 1915)
  - Catostylus tripterus (Haeckel, 1880)
  - Catostylus turgescens (Schulze, 1911)
  - Catostylus viridescens (Chun, 1896)
- Crambione
  - Crambione bartschi (Mayer, 1910)
  - Crambione mastigophora (Maas, 1903)
- Crambionella
  - Crambionella orsini (Vanhöffen, 1888)
  - Crambionella stuhlmanni (Chun, 1896)
  - Crambionella annandalei (Rao, 1931)
  - Crambionella helmbiru (Nishikawa, Mulyadi & Ohtsuka, 2014)
- Leptobrachia
  - Leptobrachia leptopus (Chamisso & Eysenhardt, 1821)

== See also ==
- Catostylus mosaicus, jelly blubber
