= Fried egg jellyfish =

Fried egg jellyfish may refer to:

- Cotylorhiza tuberculata, a medium-sized jellyfish from the Mediterranean Sea
- Phacellophora, a large jellyfish found in subarctic and temperate oceans around the world
