= Netrostoma dumokuroa =

Scientific classification
- Kingdom: Animalia
- Phylum: Cnidaria
- Class: Scyphozoa
- Order: Rhizostomeae
- Family: Cepheidae
- Genus: Netrostoma
- Species: N. dumokuroa

Binomial name
- Netrostoma dumokuroa Agassiz & Mayer, 1899

Synonyms
- Cephea dumokuroa Agassiz & Mayer, 1899

Species of jellyfish

Netrostoma dumokuroa is a species of true jellyfish in the family Cepheidae. It has been found in the South Pacific Ocean surrounding Fiji.

== Etymology ==
The specific epithet, dumokuroa, is derived from the native Fijian name for the species, dumokuro.
