= Netrostoma setouchianum =

Scientific classification
- Kingdom: Animalia
- Phylum: Cnidaria
- Class: Scyphozoa
- Order: Rhizostomeae
- Family: Cepheidae
- Genus: Netrostoma
- Species: N. setouchianum

Binomial name
- Netrostoma setouchianum (Kishinouye, 1902)

Synonyms
- Microstylus setouchianus Kishinouye, 1902

Species of jellyfish

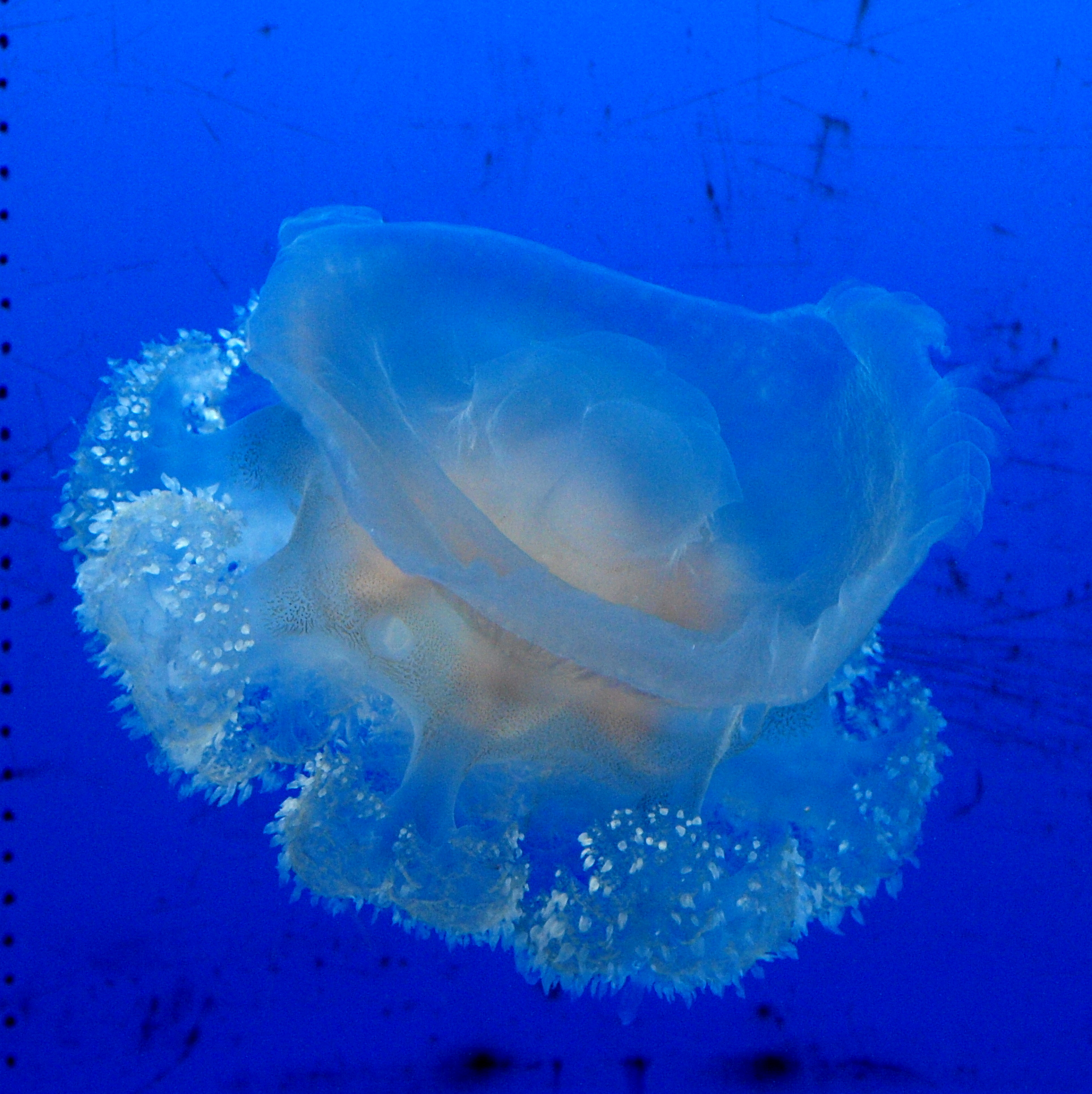
Netrostoma Setouchiana

Netrostoma setouchianum is a species of true jellyfish in the family Cepheidae. It has been found in the Pacific Ocean off the coasts of Japan, China and Vietnam.

== Etymology ==
The specific epithet, setouchianum, is derived from the species' type locality, the Seto Inland Sea (Setouchi-umi).
