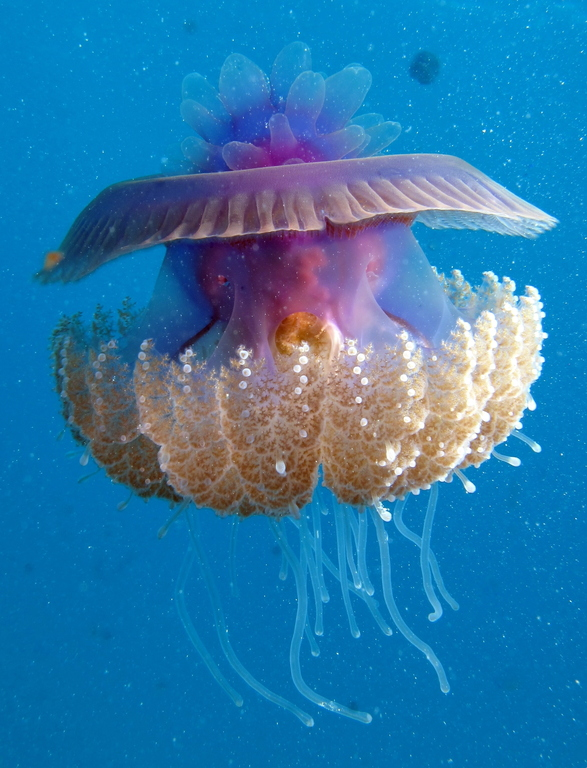

Scientific classification
- Kingdom: Animalia
- Phylum: Cnidaria
- Class: Scyphozoa
- Order: Rhizostomeae
- Family: Cepheidae
- Genus: Cephea
- Species: C. cephea

Binomial name
- Cephea cephea Forsskål, 1775

Synonyms
- Cephea forskalea Haeckel, 1880; Cephea rhizostomoidea Péron & Lesueur, 1810; Diplopilus Couthouyi Agassiz, 1862; Medusa cephea Forskål, 1775; Perirhiza nematophora Kishinouye, 1902

= Cephea cephea =

Species of jellyfish

Cephea cephea, also known as the crown jellyfish, or cauliflower jellyfish, is a species of jellyfish in the family Cepheidae. It occurs in the tropical waters of the western Indo-Pacific to Northern Australia. The species was first described by Peter Forsskål in 1775 and originally given the name Medusa cephea. It inhabits the pelagic zone of tropical and sub-tropical waters and is most commonly found in the Indo-West Pacific, eastern Atlantic and the Red Sea. Although this species is among the most venomous jellyfish, it is not harmful to humans and is eaten as a delicacy and used for medical purposes in China and Japan. The species can achieve a diameter of up to 60 cm.

== Description ==
Cephea cephea is purplish-blue in color and grows up to 60 centimeters in diameter. This species has wart-like projections and a bell shape that is associated with the given common names for the species. As in other jellyfish species, the tentacles contain nematocysts that are used to stun, kill and grapple prey items. It moves by pulsing its body to propel itself through the water. Its lifespan is approximately three to six months. These jellyfish are 95% water.

== Ecology ==
This species of jellyfish is known to live in the Pelagic zone of the ocean in the Indo-West Pacific, Eastern Atlantic and the Red Sea. They live and thrive in cold water and can be found as deep as over 3,000 feet below the surface. The species is bioluminescent. During the day it tends to remain in deeper waters, migrating to surface waters at night. Its prey mainly consists of algae, shrimp, plankton, invertebrate eggs and invertebrate larvae. The most common known predators of the species are sea turtles. Juvenile fish may occasionally swim along with it as a form of shelter.

== Reproduction ==
The reproduction cycle is similar to many other jellyfish. Adults release sperm or egg into the water; fertilized eggs form planula larvae. The planula then attaches itself to a rock or similar structure that allows it to grow into a polyp. Asexual reproduction then occurs meaning the polyp essentially clones itself and develops into another stage called the ephyra. The last process is the growth and development into an adult medusa jellyfish. This species grows unusually fast and is able to reach the size of a dime within two to three weeks under optimal conditions. Water temperature and food supply influence the efficiency of the asexual reproduction phase.

== Venom and human use ==
Cephea cephea is known to be one of the most venomous jellyfish. Although they have large amounts of venom deadly to their prey, their stings and venom are not harmful to humans. They are actually known to be eaten by humans located mostly in Japan and China. The dish is a delicacy in the Japanese and Chinese cultures. This particular species of jellyfish is used also used for medicinal purposes for humans.

== Gallery ==
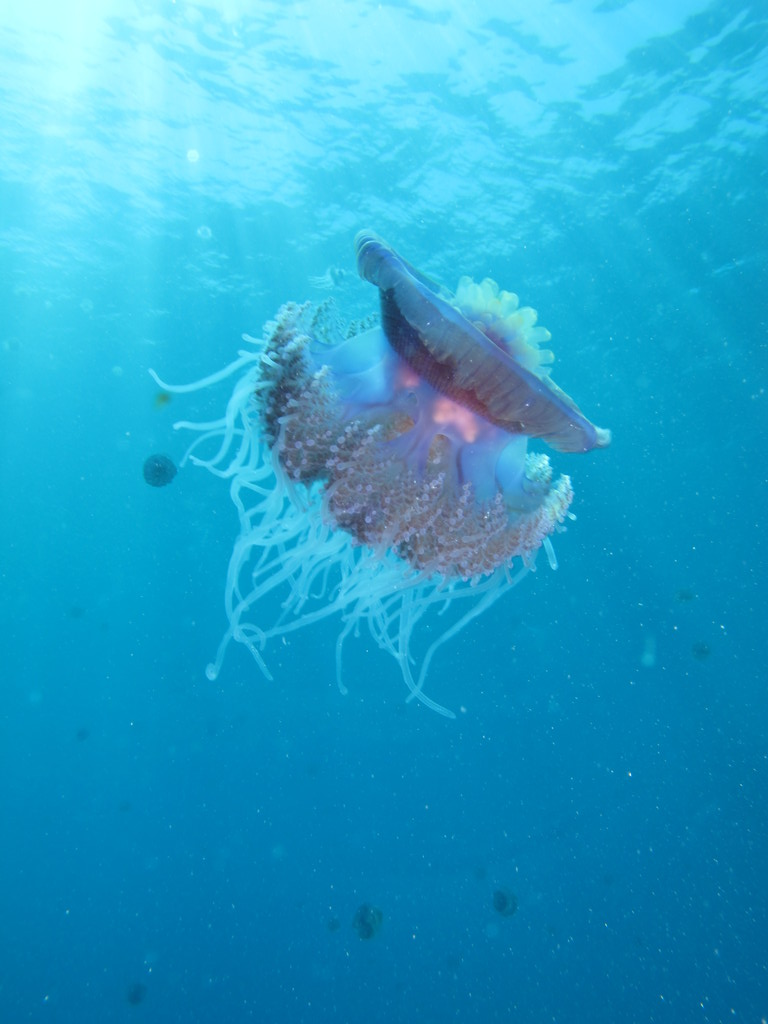

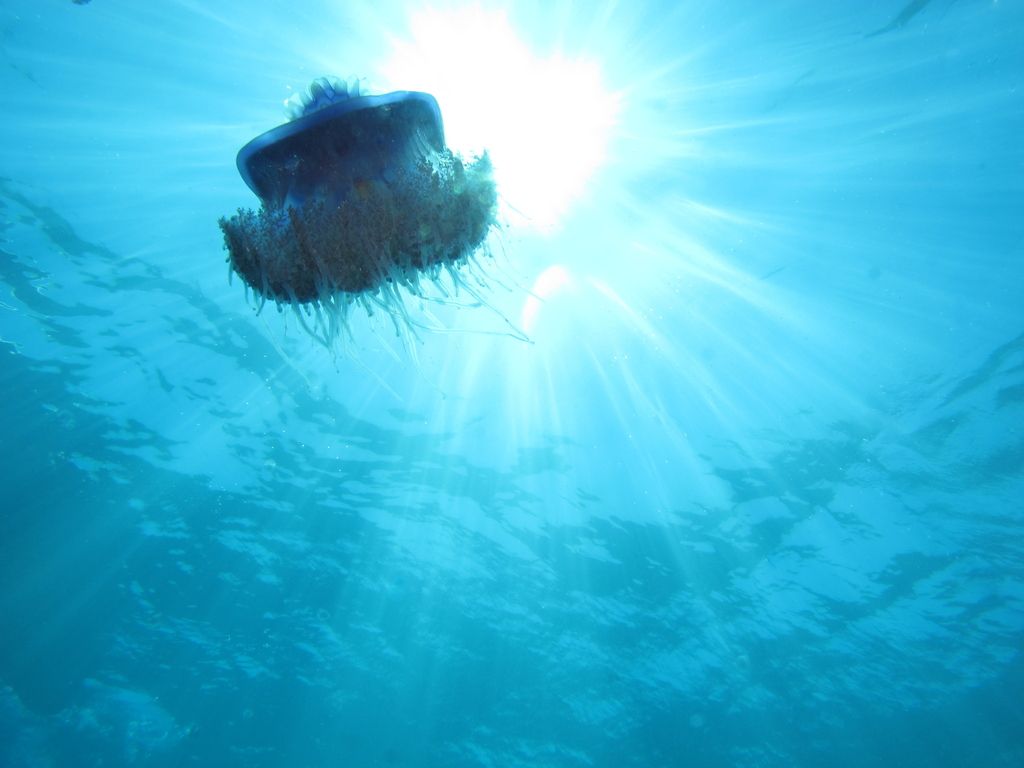

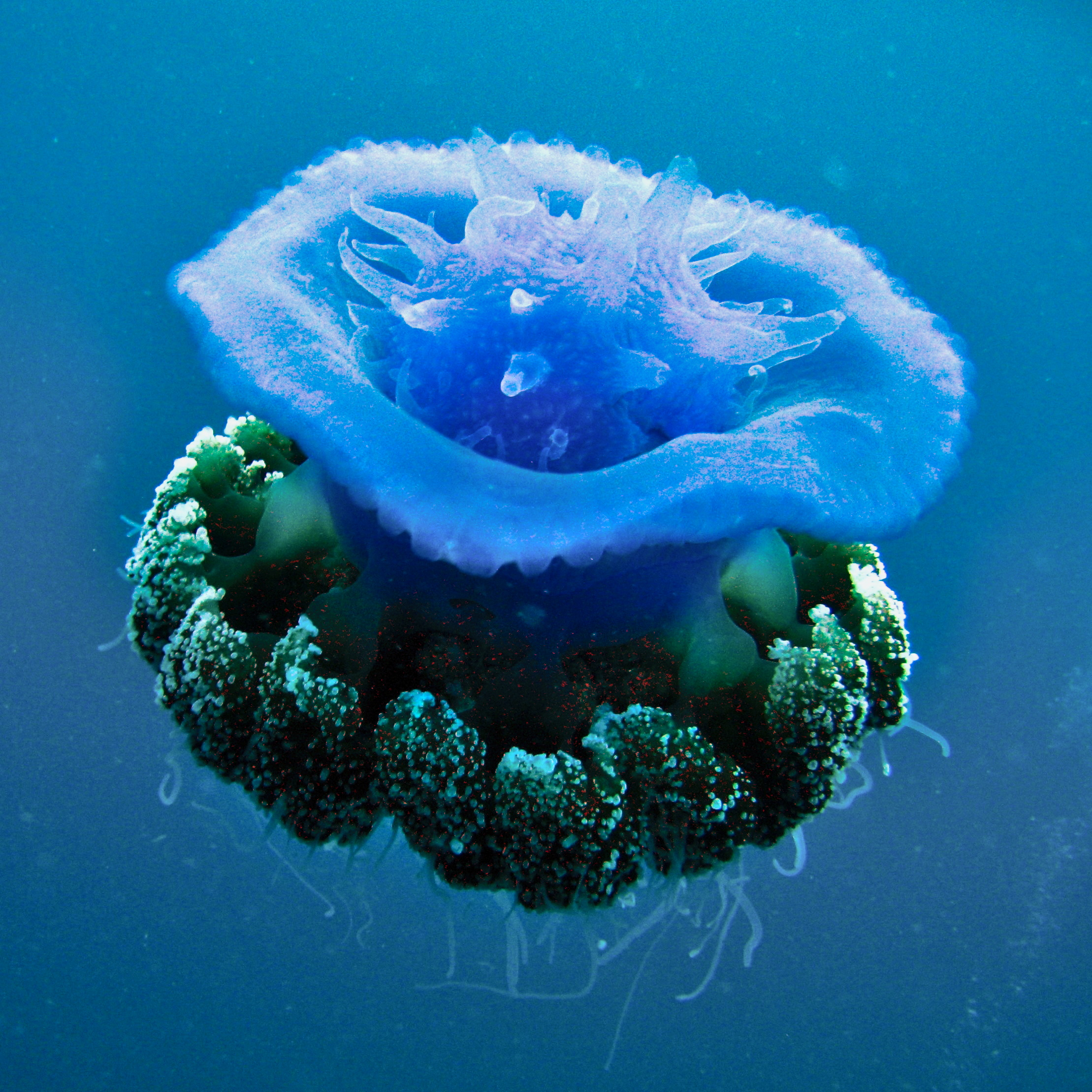

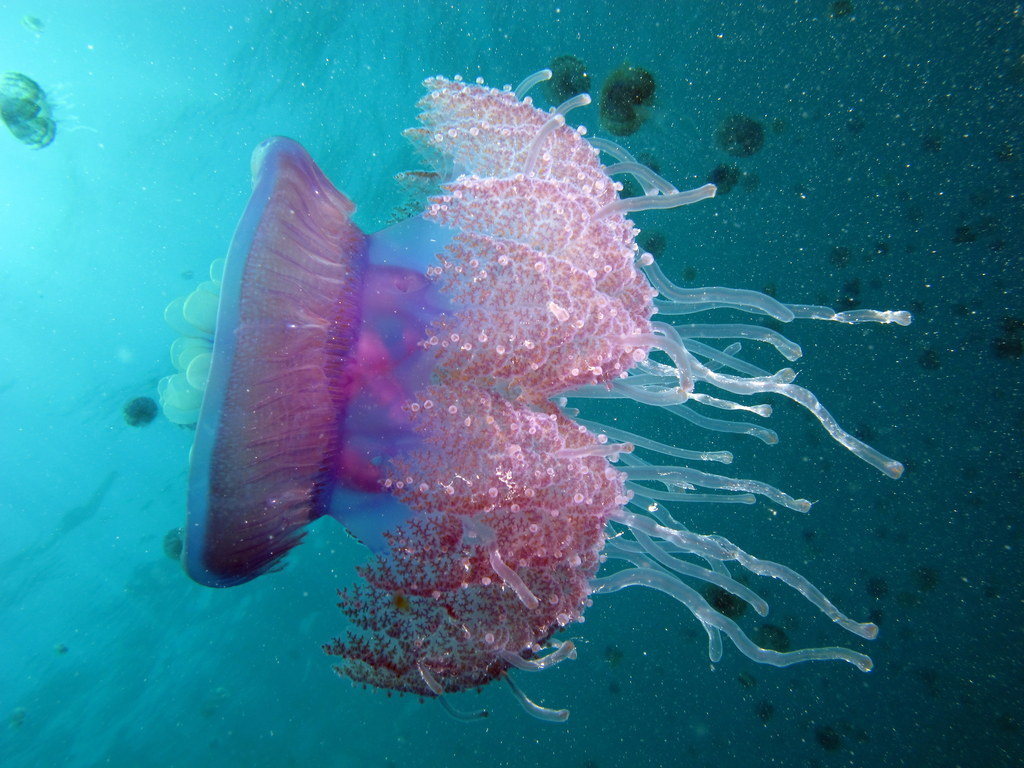

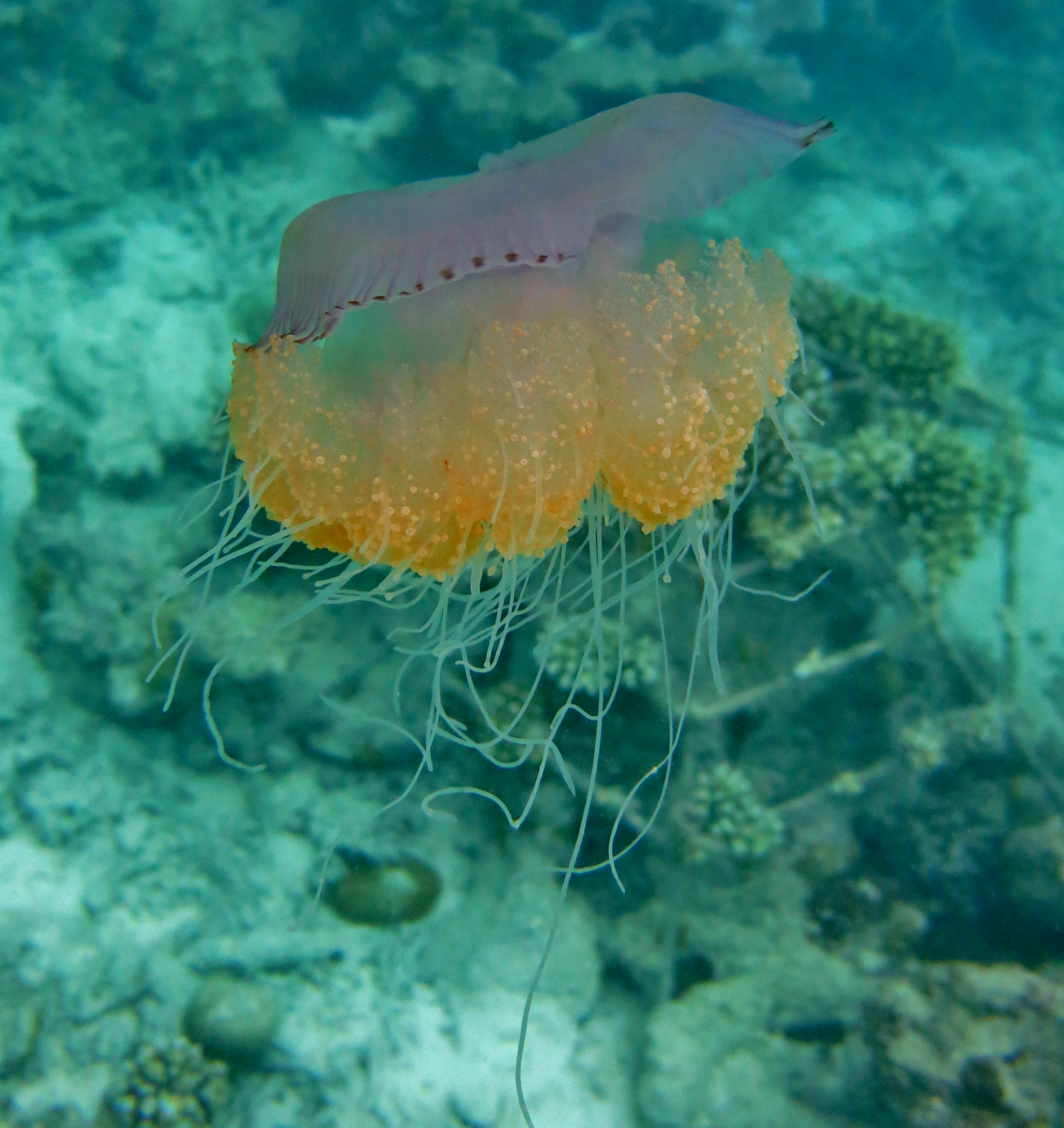
