= Cepheid (disambiguation) =

A Cepheid is a type of pulsating variable star.

It may also refer to:

- Cepheid (company), a molecular diagnostics company
- Cepheid, a fictional alien species in the Isaac Asimov novel Blind Alley

== See also ==
- Cepheus (constellation)
- Cepheidae (cnidarian)
