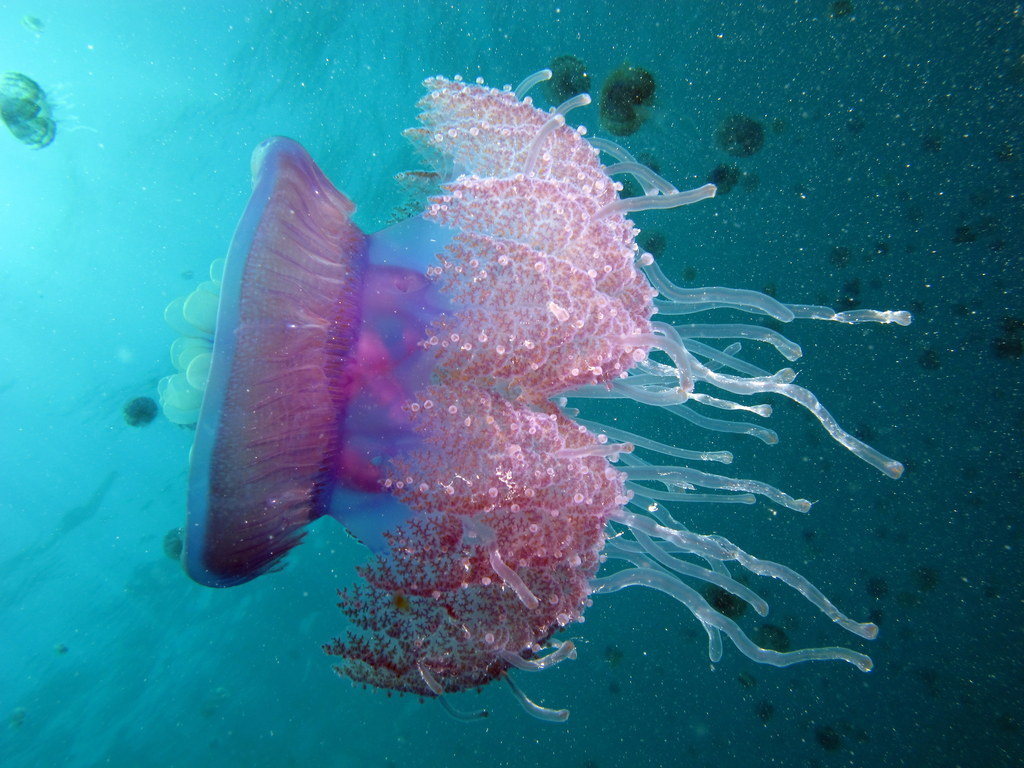
- Cephea cephea

Scientific classification
- Kingdom: Animalia
- Phylum: Cnidaria
- Class: Scyphozoa
- Order: Rhizostomeae
- Family: Cepheidae
- Genus: Cephea; Péron & Lesueur, 1810

Species
- 2 species, see text

Synonyms
- Diplopilus Agassiz, 1862; Perirhiza Kishinouye, 1902; Stylorhiza Haeckel, 1880

= Cephea =

Genus of jellyfishes

Cephea is a genus of true jellyfish in the family Cepheidae. They are found in the Indo-Pacific and eastern Atlantic oceans. They are sometimes called the crown jellyfish, but this can cause confusion with the closely related genus Netrostoma or the distantly related species in the order Coronatae. They are also sometimes called the cauliflower jellyfish because of the cauliflower-looking form on top of its bell.

== Habitat ==
Found in tropical, pelagic oceanic regions from the Eastern Central Atlantic to Indo-Western Pacific

== Lifestyle ==
Lives in a marine environment

== Species ==
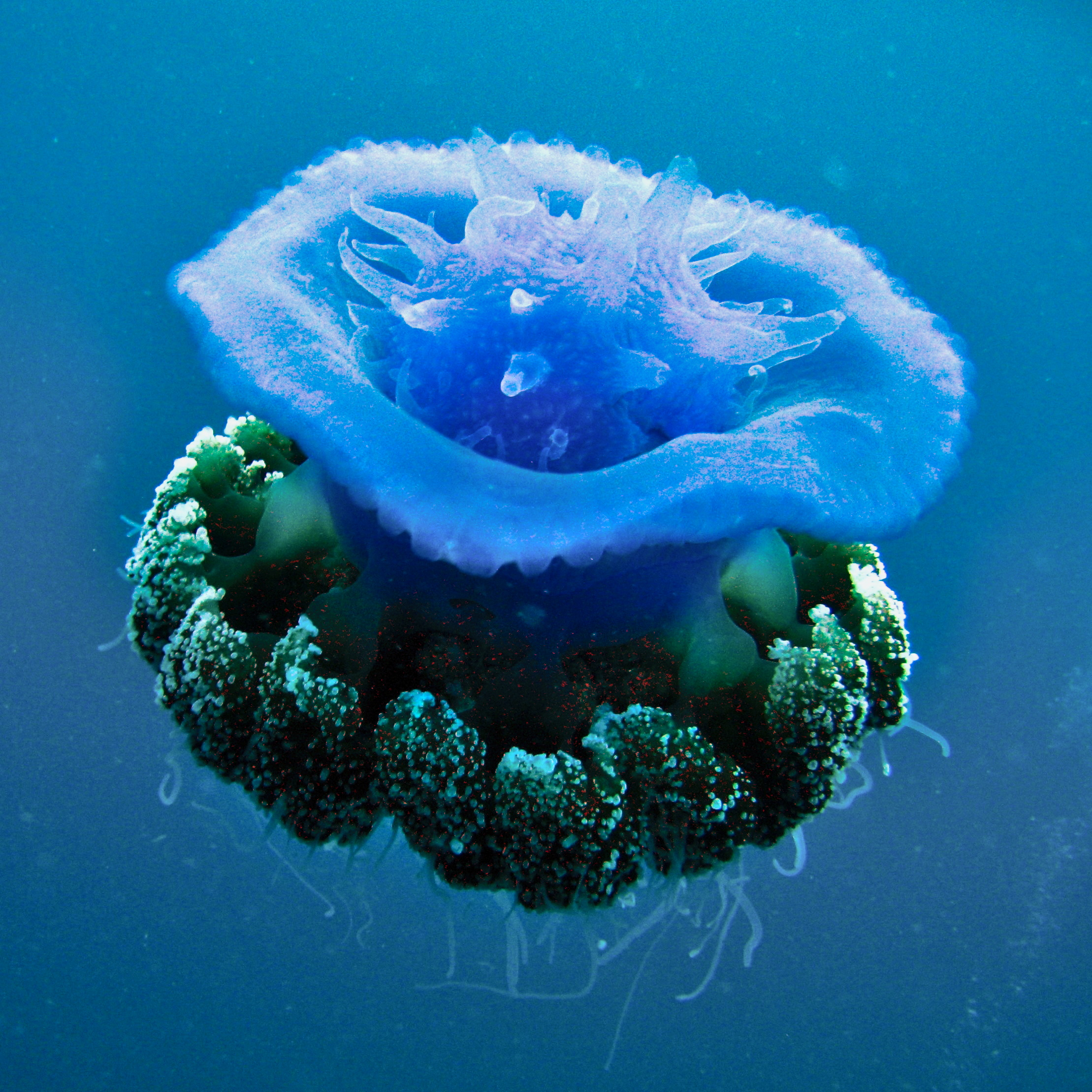
A Cephea jellyfish at Mactan, Cebu, Philippines

According to the World Register of Marine Species, this genus includes the following species:

- Cephea cephea
- Cephea coerulea
- Cephea conifera
- Cephea octostyla

=== Invalid names ===
- Cephea diplopilus (unassessed)
- Cephea fusca (unassessed)
