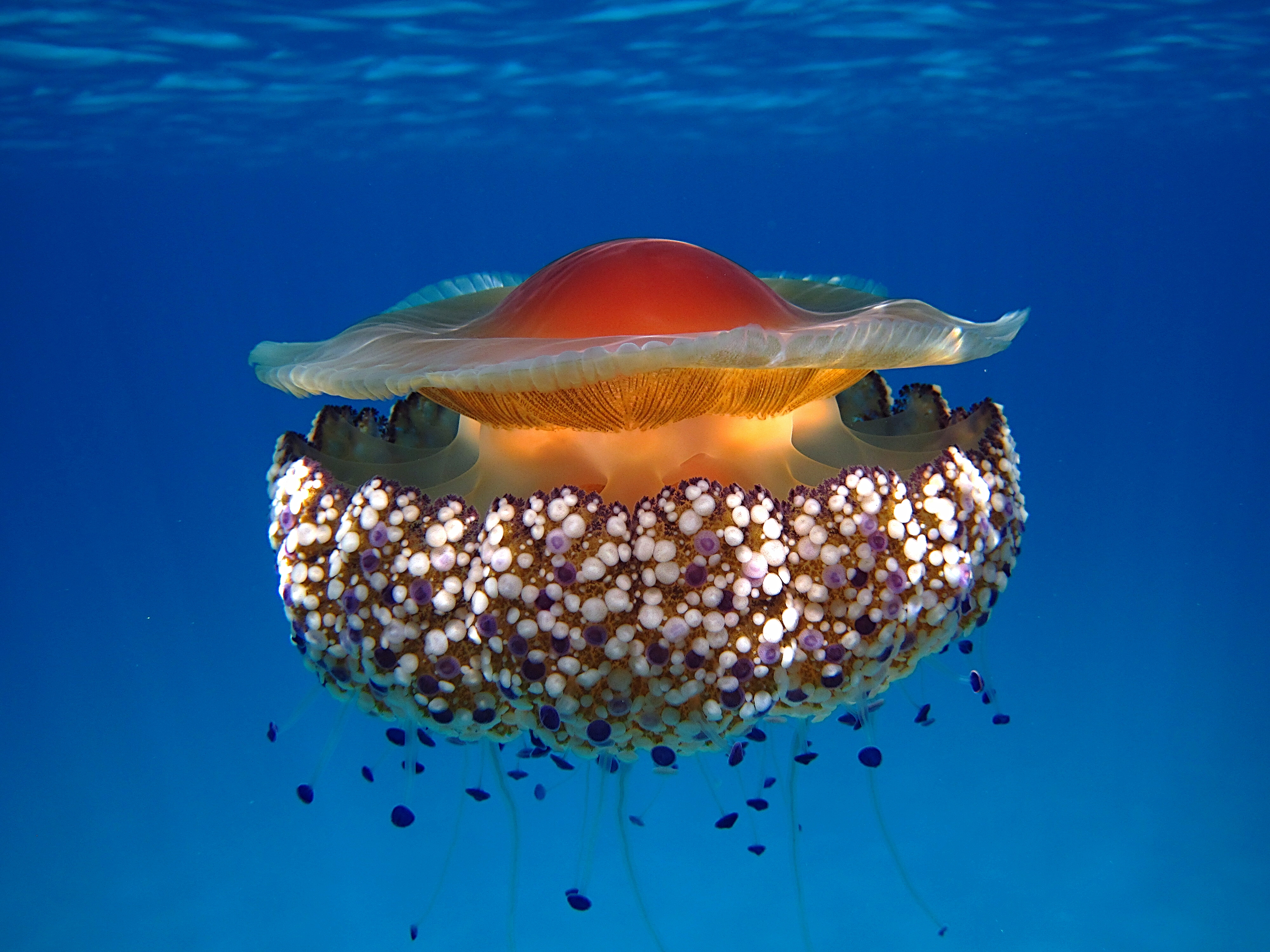
- Cotylorhiza tuberculata

Scientific classification
- Kingdom: Animalia
- Phylum: Cnidaria
- Class: Scyphozoa
- Order: Rhizostomeae
- Family: Cepheidae
- Genus: Cotylorhiza; Agassiz, 1862

Species
- Cotylorhiza ambulacrata; Cotylorhiza erythraea; Cotylorhiza tuberculata

= Cotylorhiza =

Genus of jellyfishes

Cotylorhiza is a genus of true jellyfish from the family Cepheidae. The genus is found in the central-east Atlantic, Mediterranean, and western Indian Ocean.

== Description ==
The genus Cotylorhiza falls under the family Cepheidae, which includes jellyfish. Species in this genus include Cotylorhiza abulacrata, Cotylorhiza erythraea, and Cotylorhiza tuberculata, which is the most common species in the genus, as well as in the order Rhizostomeae. Characterized by eight short oral arms, this genus is pelagic and generally tinted white or yellow and include a sun shade at the top to protect arms and cnidoblasts.

First discovered in the Sea of Marmara in the 1700s, the Cotylorhiza genus had major impacts on species in surrounding areas as it invaded the area. Species reside in pelagic environments in southern European seas, where they impact ecological balances of ecosystem due to resource competitions and rapid reproduction patterns. Cotylorhiza are among the most abundant jellyfish in the Mediterranean sea, though they are not native to this area.

== Lifestyle ==
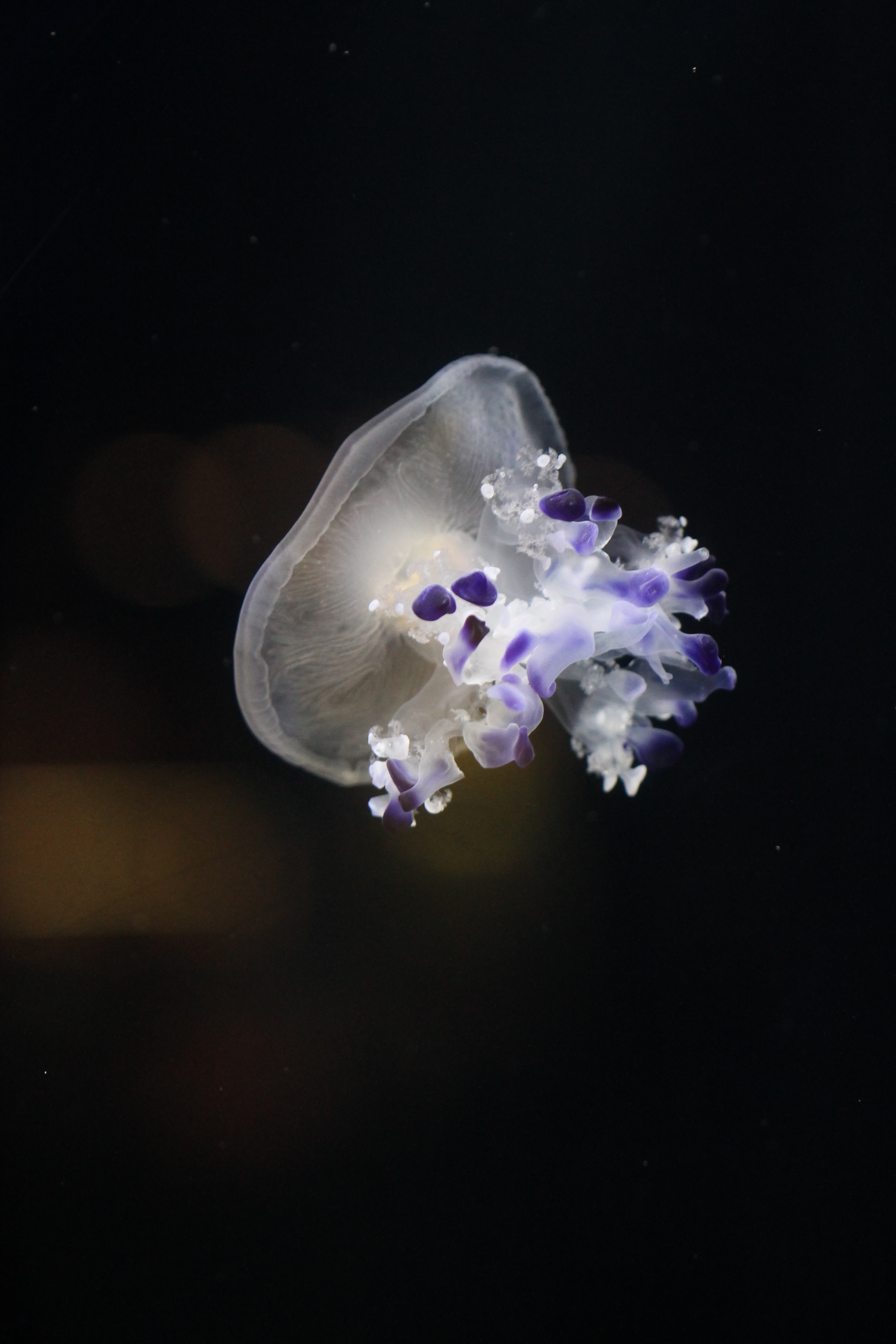
Picture of Cotylorhiza in the Moscow oceanarium

=== Feeding ===
Organisms consume zooxanthellae and zooplankton through their eight mouth arms, which transport consumed organisms to the stomach. Juvenile individuals in the Cotylorhiza genus were found to have higher feeding rates than other jellyfish of the Cepheidae family, such as Rhizostoma pulmo.

=== Reproduction and life cycle ===
Species begin as polyps attached to a substrate, and eventually grow into a medusa stage. The medusa are pelagic, swimming organisms in the jellyfish form. In the medusa stage, sperm and egg cells release into the water and fertilize to form polyps on benthic substrates. Jellyfish tend to be more abundant in spring seasons, as the temperature and resource concentrations are ideal for an increase in reproduction during this time.

== Relationships ==
Cnidarian abundance in the Northwest Mediterranean Sea can have major impacts on fish populations, as they pose a major predatory threat to juvenile fish. The size and number of fish in this area was found to be directly correlated to the size and abundance of C. tuberculata.

== Possible human impact ==
Jellyfish populations in the Mediterranean Sea, including those in the genus Cotylorhiza, may have hazardous effects on people in the area. Species in this area are becoming progressively more venomous as more invasive predators enter the waters they inhabit, therefore hospitalizations and serious injury has increased in children swimming in these areas.

Blooms of jellyfish may also impact economic stability in surrounding communities, due to overfishing which alters trophic processes. As jellyfish overpopulate ecosystems, they may wipe out large numbers of fish in their habitat. Blooms occur because of changes in temperature and phytoplankton abundance in the ecosystem.
