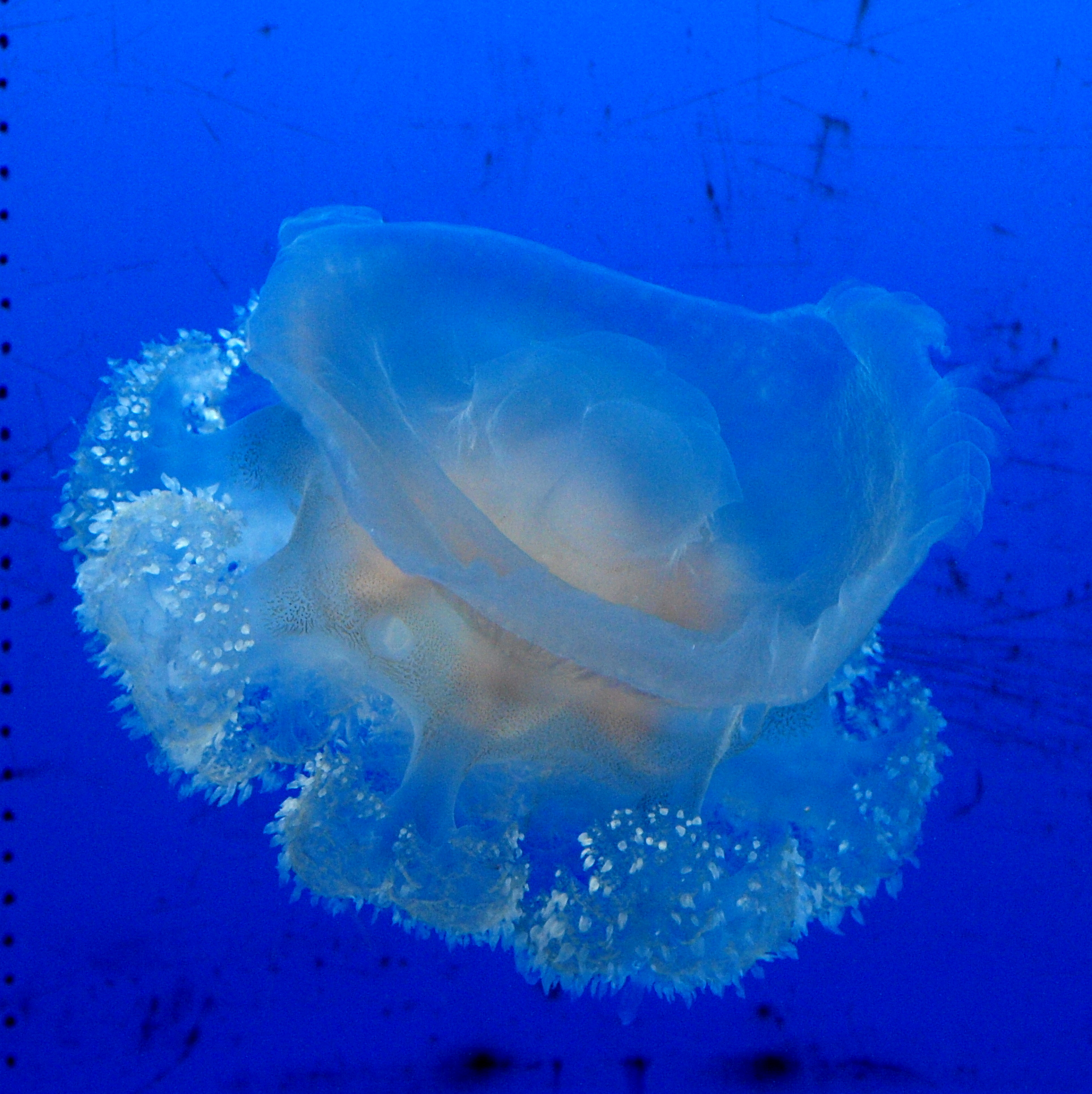
- Netrostoma setouchiana

Scientific classification
- Kingdom: Animalia
- Phylum: Cnidaria
- Class: Scyphozoa
- Order: Rhizostomeae
- Family: Cepheidae
- Genus: Netrostoma; Schultze, 1898

Species
- 4 species, see text

Synonyms
- Microstylus Kishinouye, 1902

= Netrostoma =

Genus of jellyfishes

Netrostoma is a genus of true jellyfish in the family Cepheidae. They are found in the Indo-Pacific. They are sometimes called crown jellyfish, but this can cause confusion with the closely related genus Cephea or the distantly related species in the order Coronatae.

== Species ==
According to the World Register of Marine Species, this genus includes the following species:

- Netrostoma coerulescens
- Netrostoma dumokuroa
- Netrostoma nuda
- Netrostoma setouchianum
