= Marivagia =

Scientific classification
- Kingdom: Animalia
- Phylum: Cnidaria
- Class: Scyphozoa
- Order: Rhizostomeae
- Family: Cepheidae
- Genus: Marivagia; Galil & Gershwin, 2010
- Species: M. stellata

Binomial name
- Marivagia stellata Galil & Gershwin, 2010

Genus of jellyfishes

Marivagia is a monotypic genus of jellyfish, containing only the species, Marivagia stellata, that was first described in 2010 following the discovery of several specimens on the Mediterranean coast of Israel.

== Etymology ==
The genus name, Marivagia, is derived from the Latin 'mari' (sea) and 'vagus' (wanderer), while the species name is from the Latin 'stella' (star) for the dots and star-burst like pattern on the exumbrella.

== Identification ==
The earliest specimen of Marivagia stellata was collected off the coast of Tel Shikmona, at the southern entrance to Haifa’s port, in 2006. It was photographed, preserved, and then sent to Australia for identification but was lost en route. A larger specimen was collected at nearby Bat Galim on June 29, 2010, while a smaller one was found at Beit Yanai on July 7. Photographs taken in June 2010 off Rosh Hanikra, on the Israeli-Lebanese border, documented live specimens.

== Characteristics ==
Star-shaped and with a diameter of about 15 centimeters, M. stellata is "life translucent bluish-white jelly, with conspicuous pattern of reddish stars, dots and streaks clustered in centre third of exumbrella". Three characteristics of the family Cepheidae, the radial canals, exumbrellar morphology and subumbrellar appendages, place it firmly among the Cepheids. Genetic analysis also placed it in close proximity to the Cepheids. M. stellata, however, displays several markedly different morphological features from all other Cepheid genera and cannot be placed within an existing genus.

The coast of the southeastern Levant has been inundated by alien biota and it is unlikely that M. stellata, markedly different from all known scyphozoans in the Mediterranean, is a native species. Its discovery in the vicinity of Haifa, a major port, suggests that it is indeed an invasive species. It most likely originates in the Indian Ocean, probably introduced by vessels traversing the Suez Canal. The identification of sexually mature specimens, in both winter and summer, and at sites nearly 90 km apart, suggests a local population has been established. Reports of a new and previously unknown type of jellyfish near the southern Lebanese port of Sidon have also appeared in the Lebanese press, though these have yet to be explicitly linked to M. stellata.
