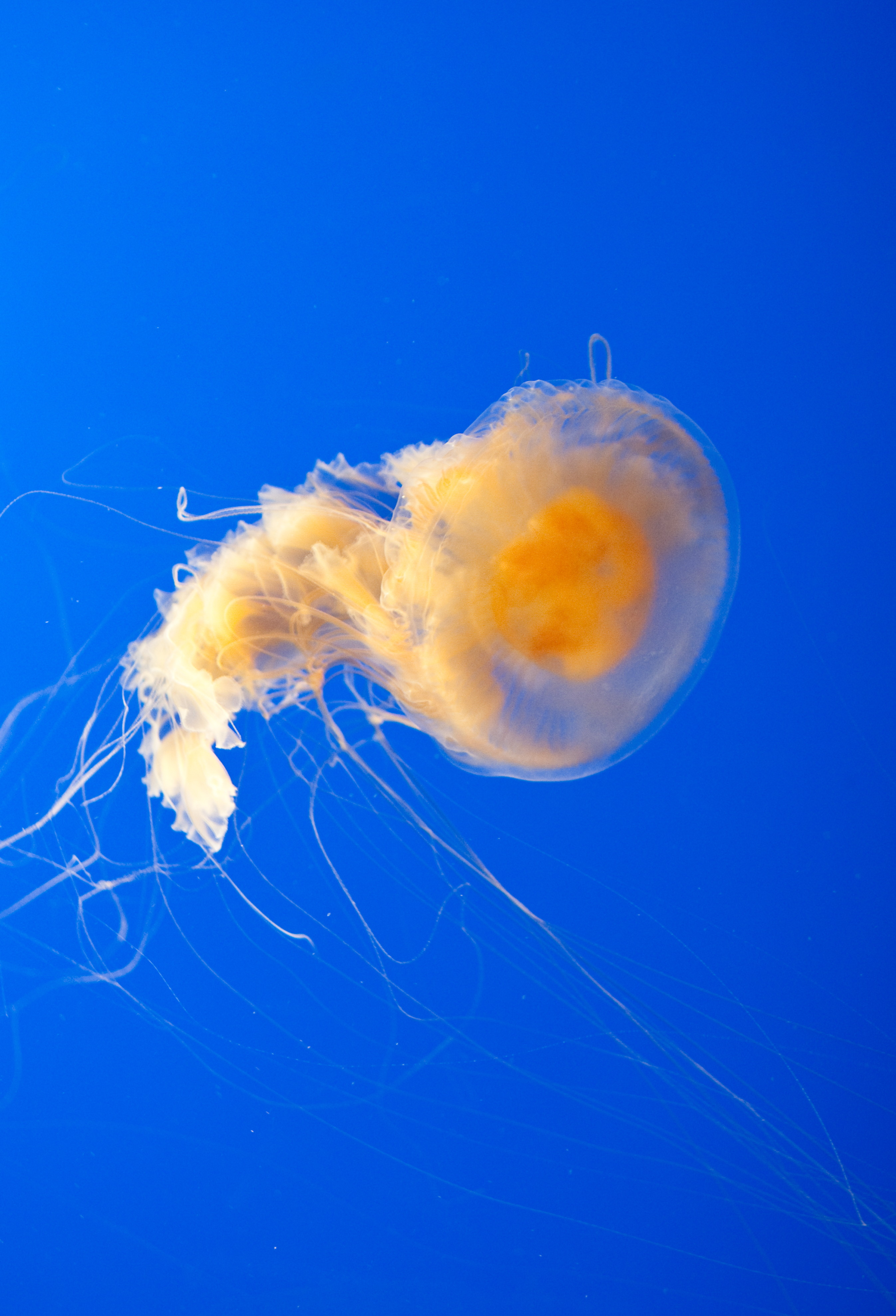

Scientific classification
- Kingdom: Animalia
- Phylum: Cnidaria
- Class: Scyphozoa
- Order: Semaeostomeae
- Family: Phacellophoridae
- Genus: Phacellophora
- Species: P. camtschatica

Binomial name
- Phacellophora camtschatica Brandt, 1835

Synonyms
- Callinema ornata Verrill, 1869; Cyanea ambiguum Brandt, 1838; Phacellophora sicula Haeckel, 1880

= Phacellophora =

Species of jellyfish

Phacellophora, commonly known as the fried egg jellyfish or egg-yolk jellyfish, is a very large jellyfish in the monotypic family Phacellophoridae containing a single species Phacellophora camtschatica. This genus can be easily identified by the yellow coloration in the center of its body which closely resembles an egg yolk, hence its common name. Some individuals can have a bell close to 60 cm (2 ft) in diameter, and most individuals have 16 clusters of up to a few dozen tentacles, each up to 6 m (20 ft) long. A smaller jellyfish, Cotylorhiza tuberculata, typically found in warmer water, particularly in the Mediterranean Sea, is also popularly called a fried egg jellyfish. Also, P. camtschatica is sometimes confused with the lion's mane jellyfish (Cyanea capillata).

It feeds primarily by collecting medusae and plankton with its tentacles, and bringing them into its mouth for digestion. It is capable of only limited motion, and mostly drifts with the current, even when swimming. This species and most of its relatives in the Cnidaria phylum often use suspension feeding as their main food gathering strategy.

The body of this jellyfish does not contain any respiratory, circulatory, or excretory systems. Instead, it uses its large surface area to accomplish these things. Also, this species (and all others in the phylum cnidaria) lack a mesoderm and instead uses mesoglea. Therefore, there are not three true tissue layers, in turn making this species (and all other cnidarians) diploblastic, not triploblastic.

The reproduction and life cycle of this jellyfish has been well documented. It mostly follows the same life cycle as other members in the class Scyphozoa. It alternates between a polyp form that reproduces asexually and a medusa form that reproduces sexually. These jellyfish are a cool water species found in most of the world's oceans, but most commonly in the Northern Pacific.

== Taxonomy and systematics ==
Phacellophora has only one species, P. camtschatica. P. camtschatica is a large jellyfish that has a yellow center, resembling a broken egg yolk, surrounded by opaque, white tissue. This jellyfish is the representative of the family Phacellophoridae in the class of Scyphozoa.This jellyfish was once believed to be part of the family Ulmaridae, but the juvenile characteristics did not match the family characteristics of Ulmaridae or Cyaneidae. Due to these findings, the family Phacellophoridae was created specifically for this genus, serving as an intermediate between Cyaneidae and Ulmaridae. Key distinguishing features are a gastric cavity with radial canals joining a marginal ring canal, as well as broad curtain-like oral arms; and subumbrellar tentacles in 16 linear clusters. Currently, Phacellophora is the sole member of the family Phacellophoridae. However, the latest phylogenetic analyses actually suggest the genus Phacellophora is a member of the family Ulmaridae. Furthermore, cryptic diversity is evident within the genus Phacellophora, with at least three or four distinct species.

== Ecology ==
=== Feeding ===
Phacellophora mainly feeds on gelatinous zooplankton and smaller jellyfish, which become ensnared within the tentacles. Tentacles contain nematocysts, which help in prey capture. These structures also provide defense against predation. Food that is caught in the tentacles is then covered in mucous, then these tentacles are brought to the mouth by oral lobes. Food is then digested by digestive enzymes in the gastrovascular cavity. Broken-down food is then distributed throughout the jellyfish by ciliary action.

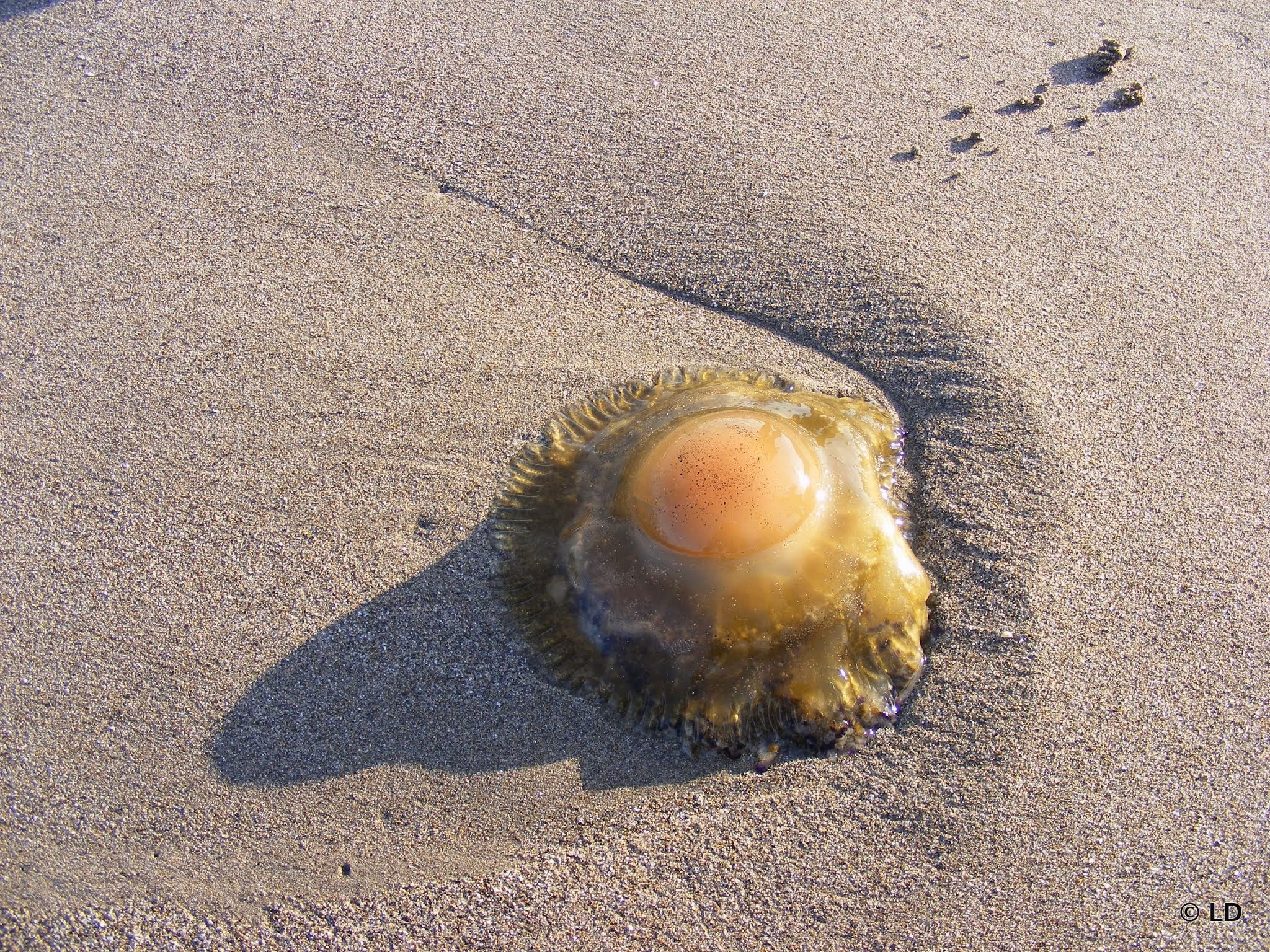
Cotylorhiza tuberculata. A different jellyfish species also commonly known as the fried egg jellyfish.

Phacellophora feeds on a great variety of taxa, including euphausiids, cladocerans, and decapod zoea, fish (including fish larvae), and especially other jellyfish such as Aurelia spp., ctenophores and Pelagia noctiluca. The fried egg jellyfish have been known to host symbionts that will transfer onto Phacellophora when the host is consumed. This is possible because the sting of this jellyfish is weak therefore allowing many symbionts/parasites including small crustaceans like larval crabs (Cancer gracilis) and some Amphipoda (Hyperia medusarum) to regularly ride on its bell and even steal food from its oral arms and tentacles.

=== Symbiotic relationships ===
Phacellophora has symbiotic relationships with larval crabs (Cancer gracilis), in which the crabs feed on the parasitoid Amphipoda (Hyperia medusarum) that also resides on the bell of the jellyfish. Larval crabs benefit from this relationship by riding on the bell of the medusa or within the tentacles to gain food and develop faster due to locomotion through warmer surface waters without expending extra energy. When the juvenile crabs first associate with the jellyfish, the crab feeds on the tentacles and preys on small plankton from the water and the hosts' surface. As the crab develops into an instar, it begins to feed on the parasitoid Amphipoda (Hyperia medusarum), which aids the jellyfish in keeping the parasitic impact low. Although a symbiotic relationship exists between juvenile Cancer gracilis and the jellyfish, when the C. gracilis matures it begins to feed more substantially on the jellyfish itself; other predators include crabs (Cancer productus and Pugettia producta) and the giant deep-sea octopus, Haliphron atlanticus, which clings to the jellyfish and consumes its oral arms and stomach.

== Body systems ==
Phacellophora does not have respiratory organs such as gills, lungs or trachea. Instead, it respires by diffusing oxygen from water through the thin membrane covering its body. Within the gastrovascular cavity, low oxygenated water can be expelled through the mouth and high oxygenated water can be distributed by ciliated action, thus increasing the diffusion of oxygen into the cells. The large surface area to volume ratio helps to diffuse more oxygen and nutrients into the cells. Similarly, this animal lacks dedicated respiratory, excretory, and circulatory systems because of the high surface area to volume ratio.

The basic body plan consists of several parts. Food travels through the muscular manubrium while the radial canals help disperse the food. The fried egg jelly and all other members of the phylum Cnidaria are diploblastic. This is due to a lack of a mesoderm, which in this phylum is replaced with mesoglea. The tissue layers of this species is a middle layer of mesoglea, a gastrodervascular cavity with a gastrodermis, and an epidermis. Additionally, there is a nerve net that is responsible for contractions in swimming muscles and responses while feeding.

Cnidarians have radial symmetry, in which tentacles are radially symmetric about the mouth, and have two main body surfaces, an oral surface and an aboral surface. During polyp stage, the oral surface is oriented upwards, but during medusa stage the oral surface is oriented downwards for more efficient mobility.

== Life cycle ==
The life cycle of this jellyfish is well known, because it is kept in culture at the Monterey Bay Aquarium. During its life cycle, it alternates between an asexual benthic polyp stage attached to rocks and piers and a sexual planktonic medusa stage that reproduces in the water column; both males and females occur in the plankton form.

The life cycle begins by eggs being fertilized, then developing into planulae that are covered in cilia. These planulae swim for roughly 3–5 days before settling by attaching to the bottom and transforming, or metamorphosing, into the polyp (scyphistomae) stage. Once in the polyp stage, the scyphistomae undergoes a series of 2-, 4-, 8-, and 16- tentacled stages of development, each representing a difference in the overall shape of the calyx and symmetry amongst tentacles. When the polyp is mature, with 30–44 tentacles present, asexual proliferation occurs via side budding, one bud per polyp, and strobilating. During strobilation, the polyp is lengthened and thinned while tentacles are shortened and thickened, and mature ephyrae are released.

When ephyrae are released, a cruciform mouth is present with nematocyst batteries scattered throughout. As ephraye mature, the tentacles elongate and become filiform. Medusae reach larger bell diameters, additional tentacles form and oral arms elongate. Gastric system develops in a centrifugal direction. After roughly 9 months (under laboratory conditions), sexual maturity is achieved and reproduction can be achieved within the water column. The cycle then repeats all over again.

== Distribution ==
This cool-water genus are found in many parts of the world's oceans even though the abundance of the sole species in open marine waters is relatively low. Though, it can be rather abundant in some parts of the Sea of Japan and the Sea of Okhotsk, especially near the shore where it was found to dominate in the southern part of this area. However, most individuals are found in isolation. It was also found in the western and eastern Bering Sea. Additionally, it constituted a noticeable proportion of jellyfish biomass in waters of the northern California Current.

In a study conducted in 2011, the egg-yolk jelly was found to aggregate mostly over deep basins, whereas in shallow areas a significant quantity of this species was found only off West Kamchatka, This is in stark contrast to the other members of the family Ulmaridae (since it is no longer a member) which prefer shallow water. This preference could be related to the bell size of the individual which ranges from 5–59 cm. This bell size likely allows the jellyfish to swim in deeper waters by resisting stronger water currents and pressure.

Also, jellyfish populations (including the egg-yolk jelly) are on the rise in degraded areas as a result of increased tolerance to detrimental factors. Additionally, jellyfish play a large role in the food web and can serve as indicators of ecosystem structure and function; The larger the jellyfish population, the greater the negative impact on ecosystem services.

The fried egg jellyfish typically moves faster during the day and swims fastest during flood tides. This jellyfish undergoes vertical migrations that span the water column throughout short and long time frames. These vertical migrations allow them to enter the low depth of the hypoxia zone.

This genus typically resides below the pycnocline and avoids crossing the boundary layer, but they often dive into the hypoxic layer during the day when competition is high. By diving deep into the hypoxia zone, the fried egg jellyfish evades competition; unlike other species where hypoxia generally causes species to move away from the oxygen depleted zone, the fried egg jellyfish is able to withstand low oxygen levels for several hours at a time. And, with the belief that hypoxia regions will continue to grow, the fried egg jellyfish could thrive.
