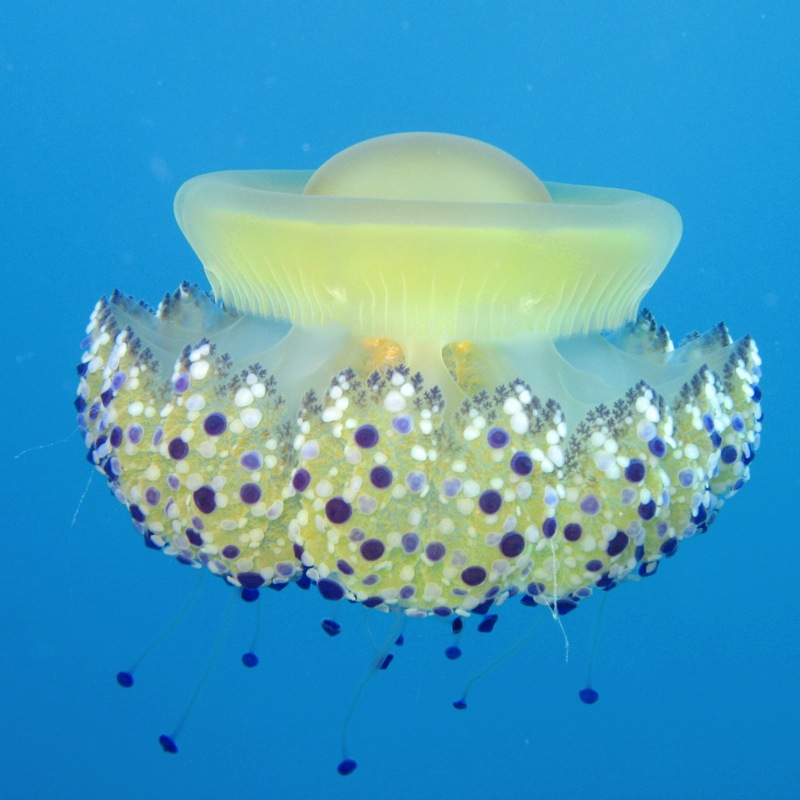

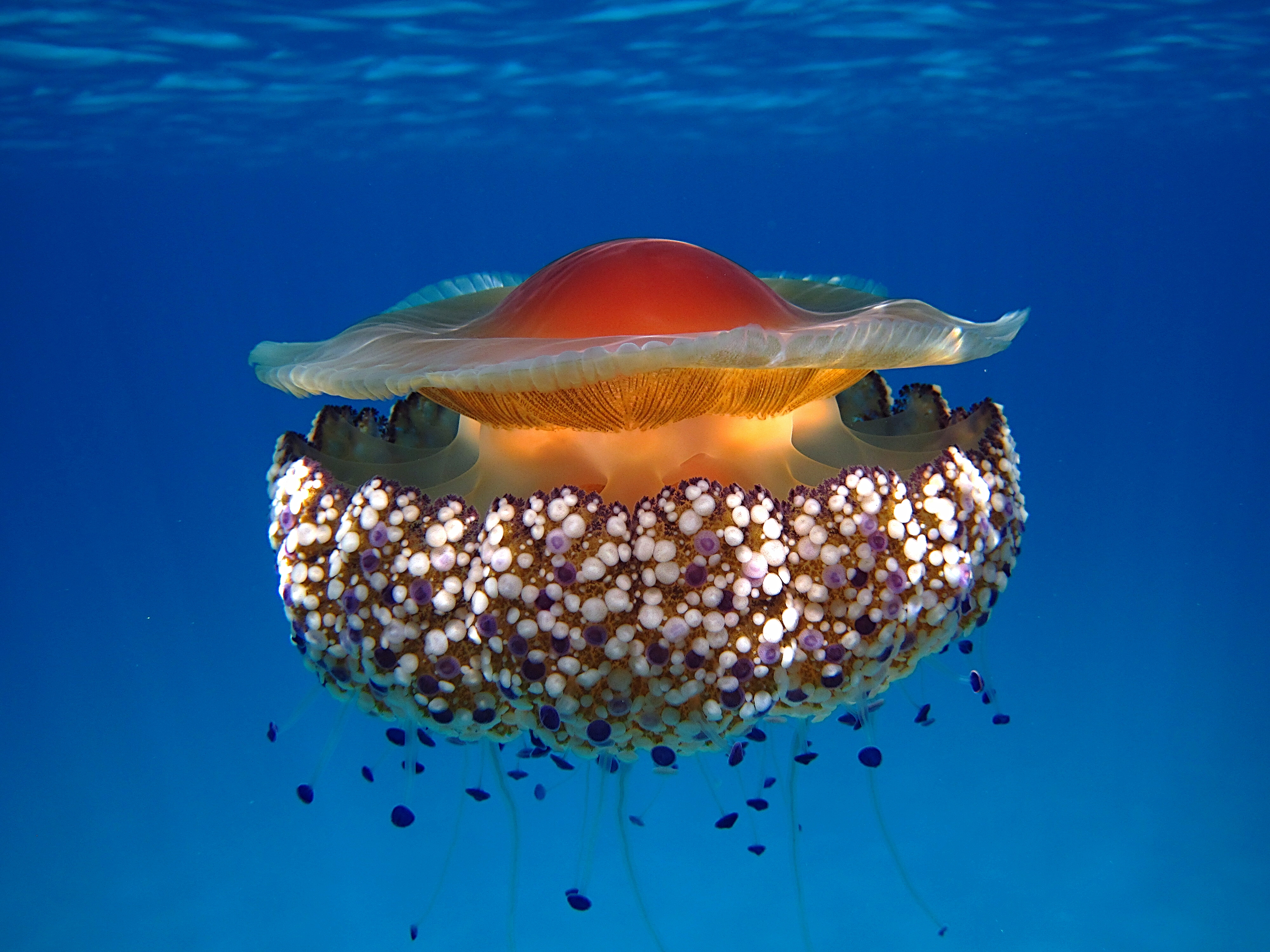
- Two examples of the species (upper from the Ionian Sea, Italy, lower from the Sant'Antioco, Sardinia)

Scientific classification
- Kingdom: Animalia
- Phylum: Cnidaria
- Class: Scyphozoa
- Order: Rhizostomeae
- Family: Cepheidae
- Genus: Cotylorhiza
- Species: C. tuberculata

Binomial name
- Cotylorhiza tuberculata (Macri, 1778)

Synonyms
- Medusa tuberculata Gmelin, 1788; Cassiopea borbonica Delle Chiaje, 1823; Cassiopea canariensis Tilesius, 1831; Cephea polychroma Péron & Lesueur, 1810

= Cotylorhiza tuberculata =

Species of jellyfish

Cotylorhiza tuberculata is a species of jellyfish of the phylum Cnidaria, also known as the Mediterranean jellyfish, Mediterranean jelly, or fried egg jellyfish. It is commonly found in the Mediterranean Sea, Aegean Sea, and Adriatic Sea.

== Description ==
Cotylorhiza tuberculata can reach 40 cm (16 in) in diameter, but is usually less than 17 cm (6.7 in) wide. This jellyfish's sting has very little or no effect on humans; however, it can cause allergies in more sensitive people. These allergies usually involve itching and scratching in the stung area. The cnidarian's smooth, elevated central dome is surrounded by a gutter-like ring. Its marginal lappets are elongated and subrectangular. Each mouth arm bifurcates near its base and branches several times. In addition to some larger appendages, there are many short, club-shaped ones that bear disk-like ends.

== Development ==
Cotylorhiza tuberculata are the most common jellyfish of their entire order in the Mediterranean Sea. They experience an annual life cycle marked by summer population blooms, which is likely an adaptive result of the strong seasonal changes in their Mediterranean environment. Their phases of development are quite similar to that of their other jellyfish counterparts. C. tuberculata's four main stages of growth include the swimming larvae known as planulae; younger, sessile polyps called scyphistomae; the undeveloped young adult intermediates known as ephyrae; and the adult jellyfish forms, called medusas. In a given year, planulae are present from August to November, scyphistomae are present perennially, ephyrae can be seen from May to August, and medusa are prominent from July to November.

Planulae use their small cilia to propel them through the water, eventually settling on a hard sediment on which they develop into their polyp form. The scyphistomae acquire their photosynthetic algae symbionts during their preliminary development phase, although the mechanism for this is still unclear. These microorganisms live primarily in the mesoglea and lining of the cnidarian's gastrovascular system, bolstering oxygen production, and remain with the jellyfish for the rest of their lifespans. The polyps also undergo asexual reproduction to create more polyps; parts of each polyp will eventually metamorphose into ephyrae, which range between 1.7 and 4.2 mm in diameter. Young medusa take 8–10 weeks to reach an initial diameter of 3 cm, and then will grow by approximately 3–4 cm per week until reaching their final adult size. Gradually, the medusa develop with an average final diameter of approximately 35 cm.

Sexual reproduction between adult medusas typically occurs between August and October. Female C. tuberculata are internally fertilized with sperm from the mouth arm appendages of their male counterparts, and after a gestation period, eventually release large numbers of planulae into the water.

With age, the adult C. tuberculata become increasingly damaged, mainly in the central dome of their top umbrella area. While the leading cause of medusa damage is wave-driven and wind-driven abrasion, the next most prominent modes of injury are anthropogenic. Motor boats and fishing nets are prominent causes of injury for these cnidarians, often leading to severe damage. This harm is a mild setback for jellyfish that have not yet finished growing, and when they are able to regenerate the injured anatomy, it often grows back asymmetrically. Older fried egg jellyfish are distinguished by their physical deterioration; their mesoglea are often delicate with a visibly broken exumbrella and their coloration fades significantly.

== Relationships with microorganisms ==
=== Symbiosis ===
The endosymbiotic, photosynthetic algae that C. tuberculata hosts in its body are paramount to the jellyfish's prosperity. These mutualistic microorganisms are also known as zooxanthellae, originating from the dinoflagellate phylum, and they commonly engage in symbiotic relationships with many types of jellyfish. While the cnidarian hosts provide shelter for these symbionts, the dinoflagellates in return use their photosynthetic abilities to provide the C. tuberculata with energy for usage and storage. Fatty acids, for example, are the primary macromolecules for energy storage in cnidarians, and are obtained mainly from their carbon-fixing symbionts. This mutualistic relationship is so crucial to the Mediterranean jellyfish's growth and survival that the preliminary step of premature medusa formation will not initiate without the presence of zooxanthellae.

=== Feeding ===
C. tuberculata primarily consume minuscule aquatic organisms, often a mixture of phytoplankton and zooplankton. They do not demonstrate a very high feeding diversity on the taxonomic level; it has been recorded that anywhere between 69% and 82% of their diet consists of organisms associated with the genus Spiroplasma. These prokaryotes have also been found in the diets of several other jellyfish species. Furthermore, the C. tuberculata's diet likely consists of only three to four main taxa of microplankton. The jellyfish takes in these tiny organisms through its mouth arms, from where they travel to its stomach. The interconnectedness of the Mediterranean jelly and its surrounding waters allows for an easy flow of plankton into its gastric cavity.

== Effects on humans ==
One of the main issues created by annual blooms of C. tuberculata is an interference with human recreational and financial activities. The usual water-related activities of tourism, in addition to more commercial activities such as fishing, are often disrupted due to the sheer number of jellyfish in the waters. This often results in the removal of thousands of Mediterranean jellies from the waters by coastal officials in the summers by fishing boats or large nets.

Another possibility raised by the prevalence of jellyfish, however, is their usefulness to humankind. C. tuberculata have been studied due to their specified cytotoxicity in regards to certain breast cancer cells, which is made possible due to the organism's efficient intercellular gap junction communication. While further studies have been proposed to further research jellies' cytotoxicity in targeting breast cancer, there still is not much investigation on the topic. Since a main objective in cancer research is to create treatments that selectively kill malignant cells while leaving healthy ones intact, Cotylhoriza tuberculata may become a model organism for the treatment of those human ailments.
