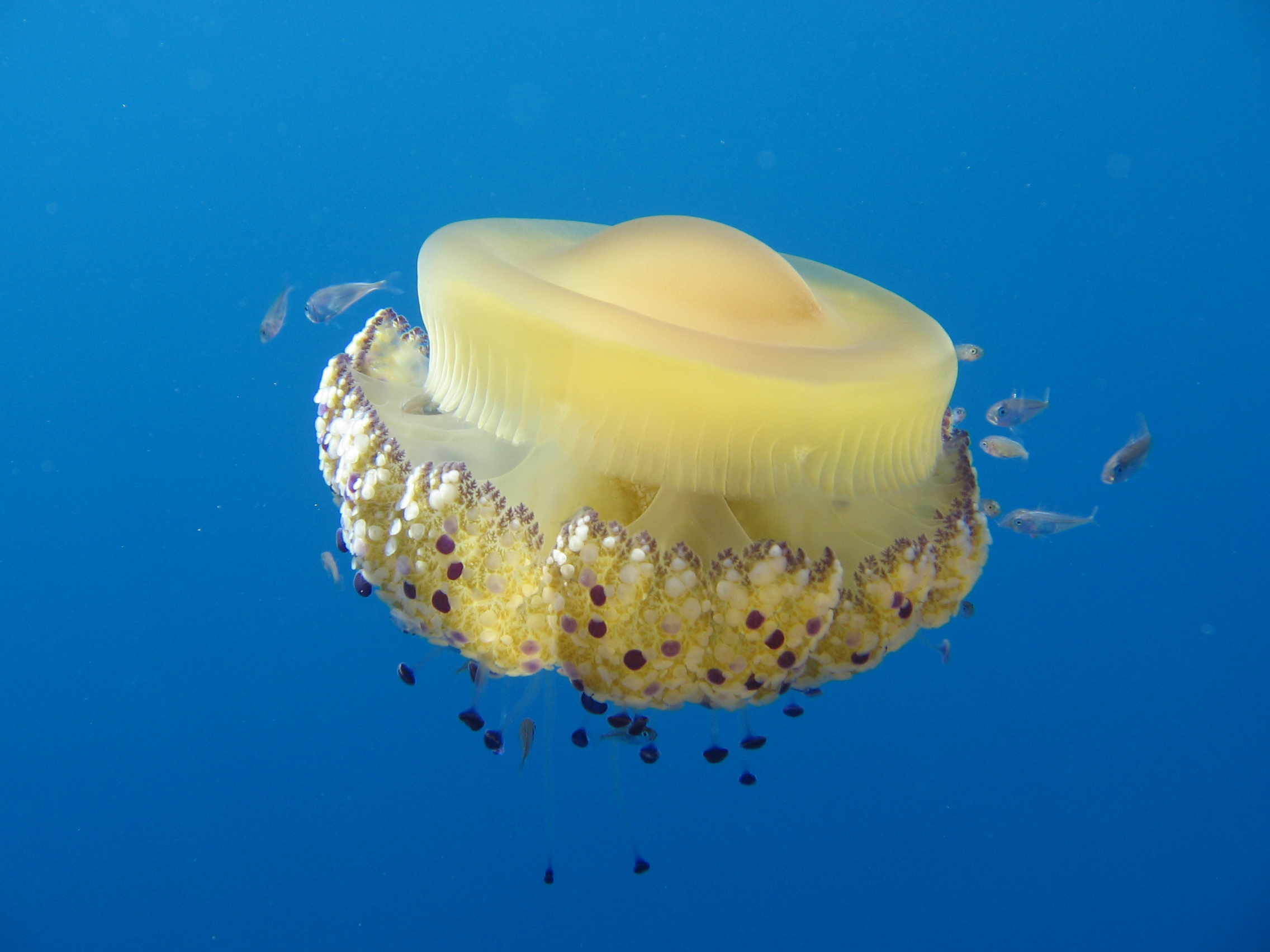
- Cotylorhiza tuberculata

Scientific classification
- Kingdom: Animalia
- Phylum: Cnidaria
- Class: Scyphozoa
- Order: Rhizostomeae
- Suborder: Kolpophorae
- Family: Cepheidae; L. Agassiz, 1862

Genera
- Cephea; Cotylorhiza; Marivagia; Netrostoma; Polyrhiza

= Cepheidae (cnidarian) =

Family of jellyfishes

Cepheidae is a family of jellyfish. It contains about 13 species.
