= Lists of prehistoric animals =

The following are lists of prehistoric animals:

== By type ==
=== Land and avian animals ===
- List of prehistoric amphibian genera
- List of prehistoric mammals
- List of fossil bird genera
- List of crurotarsan genera

==== Pterosaurs ====
- List of pterosaur genera
- List of informally named Mesozoic reptiles

==== Dinosaurs ====
- List of dinosaur genera
- List of informally named dinosaurs
- List of dinosaur species on display
- Lists of dinosaur specimens
- List of non-avian dinosaur species preserved with evidence of feathers
- List of fictional dinosaurs

===== By location =====
- List of African dinosaurs
- List of Asian dinosaurs
- List of Australian and Antarctic dinosaurs
- List of dinosaurs and other Mesozoic reptiles of New Zealand
- List of European dinosaurs
- List of Indian and Madagascan dinosaurs
- List of North American dinosaurs
  - List of Appalachian dinosaurs
  - List of archosaurs of the Chinle Formation
  - List of dinosaurs of the Morrison Formation
- List of South American dinosaurs

=== Marine animals ===
==== Corals ====
- List of prehistoric hexacoral genera
- List of prehistoric octocoral genera

==== Echinoderms ====
- List of prehistoric echinoderm genera
- List of prehistoric echinoid genera
- List of crinoid genera
- List of edrioasteroid genera
- List of prehistoric starfish genera
- List of prehistoric stylophoran genera

==== Fish ====
- Lists of prehistoric fish
  - List of prehistoric bony fish genera
  - List of prehistoric cartilaginous fish genera
  - List of prehistoric jawless fish genera
- List of acanthodian genera
- List of conodont genera
- List of placoderm genera

==== Other marine animals ====
- List of chitinozoan genera
- List of eurypterid genera
- List of mosasaur genera
- List of prehistoric annelid genera
- List of prehistoric barnacles
- List of prehistoric brittle stars
- List of prehistoric bryozoan genera
- List of prehistoric chitons
- List of prehistoric foraminifera genera
- List of ichthyosauromorph genera
- List of marine gastropod genera in the fossil record
- List of plesiosaur genera
- List of prehistoric malacostracans
- List of prehistoric medusozoan genera
- List of prehistoric nautiloid genera
- List of prehistoric ostracod genera
- List of prehistoric sea cucumbers
- List of prehistoric sponge genera
- List of trilobite genera

== By location ==
- Paleobiota of the La Brea Tar Pits, California, United States
- Paleobiota of the London Clay, England
- List of White Sea biota species by phylum, Russia
- Paleobiota of the Hell Creek Formation, northern United States
- Paleobiota of the Morrison Formation, western United States

== By period or other grouping ==
- Largest prehistoric animals
- List of Ediacaran genera
- List of Late Quaternary prehistoric bird species
- List of vertebrate fauna of the Maastrichtian stage
- List of Cambrian arthropods

== See also ==
- Lists of extinct species#Animals
- Transitional fossil#Prominent examples
- Paleontology
- Prehistory
