= List of prehistoric medusozoan genera =

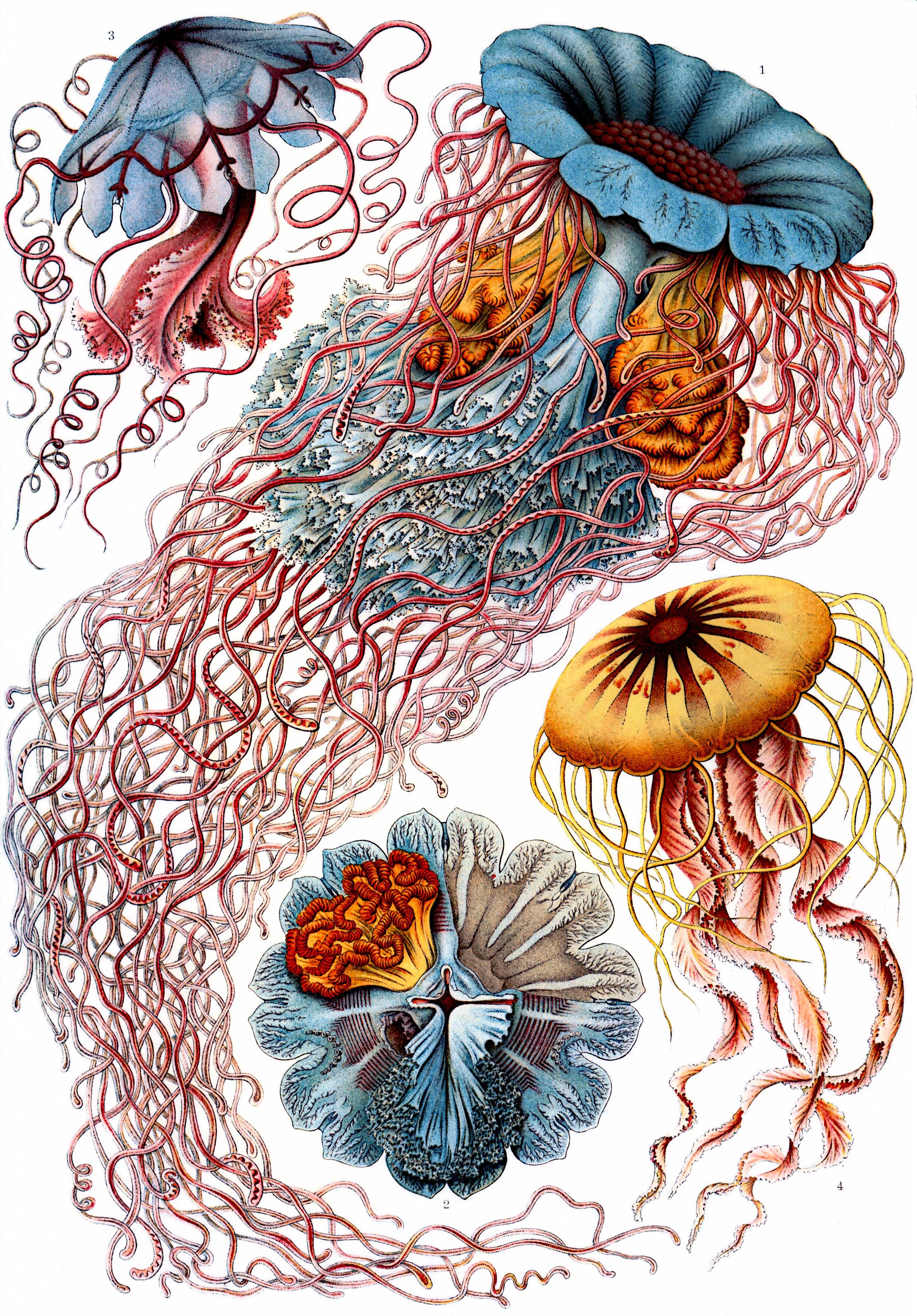
The 8th plate from Ernst Haeckel's Kunstformen der Natur (1904), depicting Discomedusae.

This list of prehistoric medusozoan genera is an attempt to create a comprehensive listing of all genera that have ever been included in the subphylum Medusozoa, excluding purely vernacular terms. The list includes all commonly accepted genera, but also genera that are now considered invalid, doubtful (nomina dubia), or were not formally published (nomina nuda), as well as junior synonyms of more established names, and genera that are no longer considered medusozoans.

== Naming conventions and terminology ==
Naming conventions and terminology follow the International Code of Zoological Nomenclature. Technical terms used include:

- Junior synonym: A name which describes the same taxon as a previously published name. If two or more genera are formally designated and the type specimens are later assigned to the same genus, the first to be published (in chronological order) is the senior synonym, and all other instances are junior synonyms. Senior synonyms are generally used, except by special decision of the ICZN, but junior synonyms cannot be used again, even if deprecated. Junior synonymy is often subjective, unless the genera described were both based on the same type specimen.
- Nomen nudum (Latin for "naked name"): A name that has appeared in print but has not yet been formally published by the standards of the ICZN. Nomina nuda (the plural form) are invalid, and are therefore not italicized as a proper generic name would be. If the name is later formally published, that name is no longer a nomen nudum and will be italicized on this list. Often, the formally published name will differ from any nomina nuda that describe the same specimen.
- Nomen oblitum (Latin for "forgotten name"): A name that has not been used in the scientific community for more than fifty years after its original proposal.
- Preoccupied name: A name that is formally published, but which has already been used for another taxon. This second use is invalid (as are all subsequent uses) and the name must be replaced. As preoccupied names are not valid generic names, they will also go unitalicized on this list.
- Nomen dubium (Latin for "dubious name"): A name describing a fossil with no unique diagnostic features. As this can be an extremely subjective and controversial designation, this term is not used on this list.

== The list ==
Genus	Class	Status	Age	Location	Description	Images	Some Karakorum stones (Stoliczkaria and Syringosphaera), relatives of Heterastridium. Fish surrounding a modern Millepora species. Fish near a modern Millepora species. Modern Millepora near Fiji.
†Anthracomedusa	Cubozoa.	Valid.					Some Karakorum stones (Stoliczkaria and Syringosphaera), relatives of Heterastridium. Fish surrounding a modern Millepora species. Fish near a modern Millepora species. Modern Millepora near Fiji.
†Archaeoantennularia	Hydrozoa.	Valid.					Some Karakorum stones (Stoliczkaria and Syringosphaera), relatives of Heterastridium. Fish surrounding a modern Millepora species. Fish near a modern Millepora species. Modern Millepora near Fiji.
†Archaeocryptolaria	Hydrozoa.	Valid.					Some Karakorum stones (Stoliczkaria and Syringosphaera), relatives of Heterastridium. Fish surrounding a modern Millepora species. Fish near a modern Millepora species. Modern Millepora near Fiji.
†Archaeolafoea	Hydrozoa.	Valid.					Some Karakorum stones (Stoliczkaria and Syringosphaera), relatives of Heterastridium. Fish surrounding a modern Millepora species. Fish near a modern Millepora species. Modern Millepora near Fiji.
†Archaeonectris	Hydrozoa.	Valid.					Some Karakorum stones (Stoliczkaria and Syringosphaera), relatives of Heterastridium. Fish surrounding a modern Millepora species. Fish near a modern Millepora species. Modern Millepora near Fiji.
†Astya	Hydrozoa.	Valid.					Some Karakorum stones (Stoliczkaria and Syringosphaera), relatives of Heterastridium. Fish surrounding a modern Millepora species. Fish near a modern Millepora species. Modern Millepora near Fiji.
†Auroralumina	Incertae Sedis	Valid.					Some Karakorum stones (Stoliczkaria and Syringosphaera), relatives of Heterastridium. Fish surrounding a modern Millepora species. Fish near a modern Millepora species. Modern Millepora near Fiji.
†Axopora	Hydrozoa.	Valid.					Some Karakorum stones (Stoliczkaria and Syringosphaera), relatives of Heterastridium. Fish surrounding a modern Millepora species. Fish near a modern Millepora species. Modern Millepora near Fiji.
†Axoporella	Hydrozoa.	Valid.					Some Karakorum stones (Stoliczkaria and Syringosphaera), relatives of Heterastridium. Fish surrounding a modern Millepora species. Fish near a modern Millepora species. Modern Millepora near Fiji.
†Cályxhydra	Hydrozoa.	Valid.					Some Karakorum stones (Stoliczkaria and Syringosphaera), relatives of Heterastridium. Fish surrounding a modern Millepora species. Fish near a modern Millepora species. Modern Millepora near Fiji.
†Cannostomites	Scyphozoa.	Valid.					Some Karakorum stones (Stoliczkaria and Syringosphaera), relatives of Heterastridium. Fish surrounding a modern Millepora species. Fish near a modern Millepora species. Modern Millepora near Fiji.
†Congregopora	Hydrozoa.	Valid.					Some Karakorum stones (Stoliczkaria and Syringosphaera), relatives of Heterastridium. Fish surrounding a modern Millepora species. Fish near a modern Millepora species. Modern Millepora near Fiji.
†Conopora	Hydrozoa.	Valid.					Some Karakorum stones (Stoliczkaria and Syringosphaera), relatives of Heterastridium. Fish surrounding a modern Millepora species. Fish near a modern Millepora species. Modern Millepora near Fiji.
†Crucimedusina	Hydrozoa.	Valid.					Some Karakorum stones (Stoliczkaria and Syringosphaera), relatives of Heterastridium. Fish surrounding a modern Millepora species. Fish near a modern Millepora species. Modern Millepora near Fiji.
†Diamantopora	Hydrozoa.	Valid.					Some Karakorum stones (Stoliczkaria and Syringosphaera), relatives of Heterastridium. Fish surrounding a modern Millepora species. Fish near a modern Millepora species. Modern Millepora near Fiji.
†Discophyllum	Hydrozoa.	Valid.					Some Karakorum stones (Stoliczkaria and Syringosphaera), relatives of Heterastridium. Fish surrounding a modern Millepora species. Fish near a modern Millepora species. Modern Millepora near Fiji.
Distichopora	Hydrozoa.	Valid.					Some Karakorum stones (Stoliczkaria and Syringosphaera), relatives of Heterastridium. Fish surrounding a modern Millepora species. Fish near a modern Millepora species. Modern Millepora near Fiji.
†Drevoôella	Hydrozoa.	Valid.					Some Karakorum stones (Stoliczkaria and Syringosphaera), relatives of Heterastridium. Fish surrounding a modern Millepora species. Fish near a modern Millepora species. Modern Millepora near Fiji.
†Eisenackiella	Hydrozoa.	Valid.					Some Karakorum stones (Stoliczkaria and Syringosphaera), relatives of Heterastridium. Fish surrounding a modern Millepora species. Fish near a modern Millepora species. Modern Millepora near Fiji.
†Epiphyllina	Scyphozoa.	Valid.					Some Karakorum stones (Stoliczkaria and Syringosphaera), relatives of Heterastridium. Fish surrounding a modern Millepora species. Fish near a modern Millepora species. Modern Millepora near Fiji.
†Essexella	Scyphozoa.	Invalid.					Some Karakorum stones (Stoliczkaria and Syringosphaera), relatives of Heterastridium. Fish surrounding a modern Millepora species. Fish near a modern Millepora species. Modern Millepora near Fiji.
†Errina	Hydrozoa.	Valid.					Some Karakorum stones (Stoliczkaria and Syringosphaera), relatives of Heterastridium. Fish surrounding a modern Millepora species. Fish near a modern Millepora species. Modern Millepora near Fiji.
†Flexihydra	Hydrozoa.	Valid.					Some Karakorum stones (Stoliczkaria and Syringosphaera), relatives of Heterastridium. Fish surrounding a modern Millepora species. Fish near a modern Millepora species. Modern Millepora near Fiji.
†Gelenoptron	Hydrozoa.	Valid.					Some Karakorum stones (Stoliczkaria and Syringosphaera), relatives of Heterastridium. Fish surrounding a modern Millepora species. Fish near a modern Millepora species. Modern Millepora near Fiji.
†Germanicum	Scyphozoa.	Valid.					Some Karakorum stones (Stoliczkaria and Syringosphaera), relatives of Heterastridium. Fish surrounding a modern Millepora species. Fish near a modern Millepora species. Modern Millepora near Fiji.
†Haootia	Staurozoa	Valid.					Some Karakorum stones (Stoliczkaria and Syringosphaera), relatives of Heterastridium. Fish surrounding a modern Millepora species. Fish near a modern Millepora species. Modern Millepora near Fiji.
†Heterastridium	Hydrozoa.	Valid.					Some Karakorum stones (Stoliczkaria and Syringosphaera), relatives of Heterastridium. Fish surrounding a modern Millepora species. Fish near a modern Millepora species. Modern Millepora near Fiji.
Hydractinia	Hydrozoa.	Valid.					Some Karakorum stones (Stoliczkaria and Syringosphaera), relatives of Heterastridium. Fish surrounding a modern Millepora species. Fish near a modern Millepora species. Modern Millepora near Fiji.
†Hydrallmania	Hydrozoa.	Valid.					Some Karakorum stones (Stoliczkaria and Syringosphaera), relatives of Heterastridium. Fish surrounding a modern Millepora species. Fish near a modern Millepora species. Modern Millepora near Fiji.
†Inocaulis	Hydrozoa.	Valid.					Some Karakorum stones (Stoliczkaria and Syringosphaera), relatives of Heterastridium. Fish surrounding a modern Millepora species. Fish near a modern Millepora species. Modern Millepora near Fiji.
†Kristinella	Hydrozoa.	Valid.					Some Karakorum stones (Stoliczkaria and Syringosphaera), relatives of Heterastridium. Fish surrounding a modern Millepora species. Fish near a modern Millepora species. Modern Millepora near Fiji.
†Kullingia	Hydrozoa.	Valid.					Some Karakorum stones (Stoliczkaria and Syringosphaera), relatives of Heterastridium. Fish surrounding a modern Millepora species. Fish near a modern Millepora species. Modern Millepora near Fiji.
†Lorenzinia	Scyphozoa.	Valid.					Some Karakorum stones (Stoliczkaria and Syringosphaera), relatives of Heterastridium. Fish surrounding a modern Millepora species. Fish near a modern Millepora species. Modern Millepora near Fiji.
†Mamsetia	Staurozoa.	Valid.					Some Karakorum stones (Stoliczkaria and Syringosphaera), relatives of Heterastridium. Fish surrounding a modern Millepora species. Fish near a modern Millepora species. Modern Millepora near Fiji.
†Mazohydra	Hydrozoa.	Valid.					Some Karakorum stones (Stoliczkaria and Syringosphaera), relatives of Heterastridium. Fish surrounding a modern Millepora species. Fish near a modern Millepora species. Modern Millepora near Fiji.
†Mesokylix	Hydrozoa.	Valid.					Some Karakorum stones (Stoliczkaria and Syringosphaera), relatives of Heterastridium. Fish surrounding a modern Millepora species. Fish near a modern Millepora species. Modern Millepora near Fiji.
†Milleaster	Hydrozoa.	Valid.					Some Karakorum stones (Stoliczkaria and Syringosphaera), relatives of Heterastridium. Fish surrounding a modern Millepora species. Fish near a modern Millepora species. Modern Millepora near Fiji.
Millepora	Hydrozoa.	Valid.					Some Karakorum stones (Stoliczkaria and Syringosphaera), relatives of Heterastridium. Fish surrounding a modern Millepora species. Fish near a modern Millepora species. Modern Millepora near Fiji.
†Octomedusa	Scyphozoa.	Valid.					Some Karakorum stones (Stoliczkaria and Syringosphaera), relatives of Heterastridium. Fish surrounding a modern Millepora species. Fish near a modern Millepora species. Modern Millepora near Fiji.
†Palaeacmea	Hydrozoa.	Valid.					Some Karakorum stones (Stoliczkaria and Syringosphaera), relatives of Heterastridium. Fish surrounding a modern Millepora species. Fish near a modern Millepora species. Modern Millepora near Fiji.
†Palaelophacmaea	Hydrozoa.	Valid.					Some Karakorum stones (Stoliczkaria and Syringosphaera), relatives of Heterastridium. Fish surrounding a modern Millepora species. Fish near a modern Millepora species. Modern Millepora near Fiji.
†Palaeokylix	Hydrozoa.	Valid.					Some Karakorum stones (Stoliczkaria and Syringosphaera), relatives of Heterastridium. Fish surrounding a modern Millepora species. Fish near a modern Millepora species. Modern Millepora near Fiji.
†Palaeomillepora	Hydrozoa.	Valid.					Some Karakorum stones (Stoliczkaria and Syringosphaera), relatives of Heterastridium. Fish surrounding a modern Millepora species. Fish near a modern Millepora species. Modern Millepora near Fiji.
†Palaeonectris	Hydrozoa.	Valid.					Some Karakorum stones (Stoliczkaria and Syringosphaera), relatives of Heterastridium. Fish surrounding a modern Millepora species. Fish near a modern Millepora species. Modern Millepora near Fiji.
†Palaeotuba	Hydrozoa.	Valid.					Some Karakorum stones (Stoliczkaria and Syringosphaera), relatives of Heterastridium. Fish surrounding a modern Millepora species. Fish near a modern Millepora species. Modern Millepora near Fiji.
†Parleria	Hydrozoa.	Valid.					Some Karakorum stones (Stoliczkaria and Syringosphaera), relatives of Heterastridium. Fish surrounding a modern Millepora species. Fish near a modern Millepora species. Modern Millepora near Fiji.
†Philippinactinia	Hydrozoa.	Valid.					Some Karakorum stones (Stoliczkaria and Syringosphaera), relatives of Heterastridium. Fish surrounding a modern Millepora species. Fish near a modern Millepora species. Modern Millepora near Fiji.
†Plectodiscus	Hydrozoa.	Valid.					Some Karakorum stones (Stoliczkaria and Syringosphaera), relatives of Heterastridium. Fish surrounding a modern Millepora species. Fish near a modern Millepora species. Modern Millepora near Fiji.
†Pliobothrus	Hydrozoa.	Valid.					Some Karakorum stones (Stoliczkaria and Syringosphaera), relatives of Heterastridium. Fish surrounding a modern Millepora species. Fish near a modern Millepora species. Modern Millepora near Fiji.
†Protohalecium	Hydrozoa.	Valid.					Some Karakorum stones (Stoliczkaria and Syringosphaera), relatives of Heterastridium. Fish surrounding a modern Millepora species. Fish near a modern Millepora species. Modern Millepora near Fiji.
†Protolyella	Hydrozoa.	Valid.					Some Karakorum stones (Stoliczkaria and Syringosphaera), relatives of Heterastridium. Fish surrounding a modern Millepora species. Fish near a modern Millepora species. Modern Millepora near Fiji.
†Protulophila	Hydrozoa.	Valid.					Some Karakorum stones (Stoliczkaria and Syringosphaera), relatives of Heterastridium. Fish surrounding a modern Millepora species. Fish near a modern Millepora species. Modern Millepora near Fiji.
†Psammactinia	Hydrozoa.	Valid.					Some Karakorum stones (Stoliczkaria and Syringosphaera), relatives of Heterastridium. Fish surrounding a modern Millepora species. Fish near a modern Millepora species. Modern Millepora near Fiji.
†Quadrimedusina	Cubozoa.	Valid.					Some Karakorum stones (Stoliczkaria and Syringosphaera), relatives of Heterastridium. Fish surrounding a modern Millepora species. Fish near a modern Millepora species. Modern Millepora near Fiji.
†Rhabdohydra	Hydrozoa.	Valid.					Some Karakorum stones (Stoliczkaria and Syringosphaera), relatives of Heterastridium. Fish surrounding a modern Millepora species. Fish near a modern Millepora species. Modern Millepora near Fiji.
†Sphenoecium	Hydrozoa.	Valid.					Some Karakorum stones (Stoliczkaria and Syringosphaera), relatives of Heterastridium. Fish surrounding a modern Millepora species. Fish near a modern Millepora species. Modern Millepora near Fiji.
†Sporadopora	Hydrozoa.	Valid.					Some Karakorum stones (Stoliczkaria and Syringosphaera), relatives of Heterastridium. Fish surrounding a modern Millepora species. Fish near a modern Millepora species. Modern Millepora near Fiji.
†Stylaster	Hydrozoa.	Valid.					Some Karakorum stones (Stoliczkaria and Syringosphaera), relatives of Heterastridium. Fish surrounding a modern Millepora species. Fish near a modern Millepora species. Modern Millepora near Fiji.
†Subaxopora	Hydrozoa.	Valid.					Some Karakorum stones (Stoliczkaria and Syringosphaera), relatives of Heterastridium. Fish surrounding a modern Millepora species. Fish near a modern Millepora species. Modern Millepora near Fiji.

== See also ==
- List of prehistoric hexacorals
- List of prehistoric octocorals
