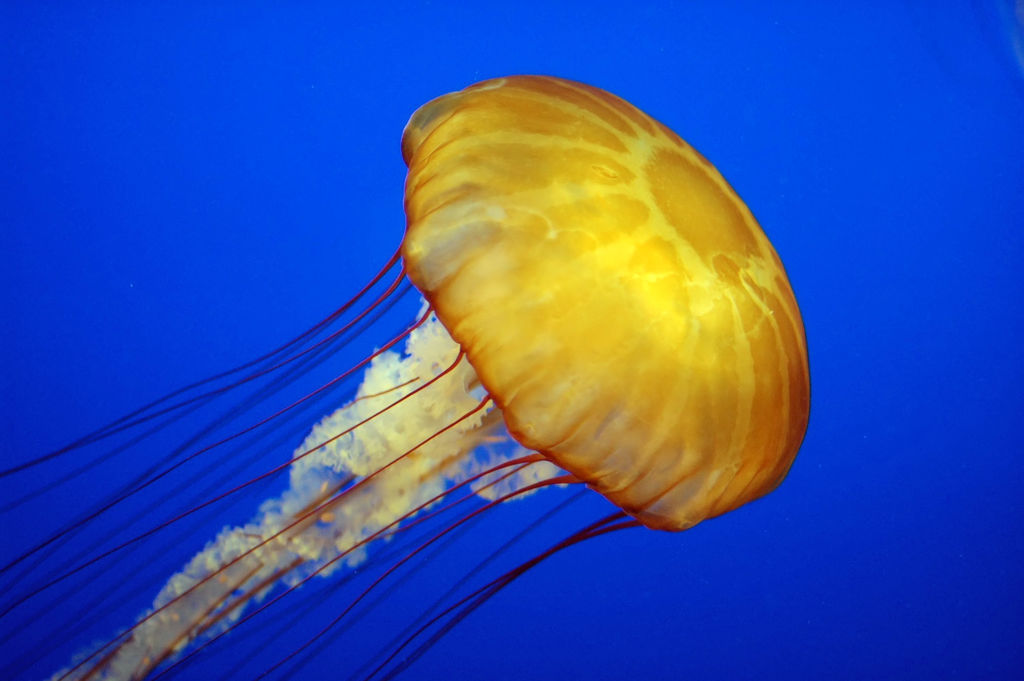
- Pacific sea nettle (Chrysaora fuscescens)

Scientific classification
- Kingdom: Animalia
- Phylum: Cnidaria
- Subphylum: Medusozoa

Groups included
- Acraspeda; Cubozoa—box jellyfish; Scyphozoa—true jellyfish; Staurozoa—stalked jellyfish; some Hydrozoa—small jellyfish

Cladistically included but traditionally excluded taxa
- some Hydrozoa, such as Hydra

= Jellyfish =

Soft-bodied, aquatic invertebrates

Spotted jellies swimming in a Tokyo aquarium

Jellyfish, also known as sea jellies or simply jellies, are the medusa-phase of certain gelatinous members of the subphylum Medusozoa, which is a major part of the phylum Cnidaria. Jellyfish are mainly free-swimming marine animals, although a few are anchored to the seabed by stalks rather than being motile. They are made of an umbrella-shaped main body made of mesoglea, known as the bell, and a collection of trailing tentacles on the underside.

Via pulsating contractions, the bell can provide propulsion for locomotion through open water. The tentacles are armed with stinging cells and may be used to capture prey or to defend against predators. Jellyfish have a complex life cycle, and the medusa is normally the sexual phase, which produces planula larvae. These then disperse widely and enter a sedentary polyp phase which may include asexual budding before reaching sexual maturity.

Jellyfish are found all over the world, from surface waters to the deep sea. Scyphozoans (the "true jellyfish") are exclusively marine, but some hydrozoans with a similar appearance live in fresh water. Large, often colorful, jellyfish are common in coastal zones worldwide. The medusae of most species are fast-growing, and mature within a few months then die soon after breeding, but the polyp stage, attached to the seabed, may be much more long-lived. Jellyfish have been in existence for at least 500 million years, and possibly 700 million years or more, making them the oldest multi-organ animal group.

Some jellyfish are eaten by humans in certain cultures. They are considered a delicacy in some Asian countries, where species in the Rhizostomeae order are pressed and salted to remove excess water. Australian researchers have described them as a "perfect food": sustainable and protein-rich but relatively low in food energy.

They are also used in cell and molecular biology research, especially the green fluorescent protein used by some species for bioluminescence. This protein has been adapted as a fluorescent reporter for inserted genes and has had a large impact on fluorescence microscopy.

The stinging cells used by jellyfish to subdue their prey can injure humans. Thousands of swimmers worldwide are stung every year, with effects ranging from mild discomfort to serious injury or even death. When conditions are favourable, jellyfish can form vast swarms, which may damage fishing gear by filling fishing nets, and sometimes clog the cooling systems of power and desalination plants which draw their water from the sea.

== Names ==
The name jellyfish, in use since 1796, has traditionally been applied to medusae and all similar animals including the comb jellies (ctenophores, another phylum). The term jellies or sea jellies is more recent, having been introduced by public aquaria in an effort to avoid use of the word "fish" with its modern connotation of an animal with a backbone, though shellfish, cuttlefish and starfish are not vertebrates either. In scientific literature, "jelly" and "jellyfish" have been used interchangeably. Many sources refer to only scyphozoans as "true jellyfish".

A group of jellyfish is called a "smack" or a "smuck".

== Mapping to taxonomic groups ==
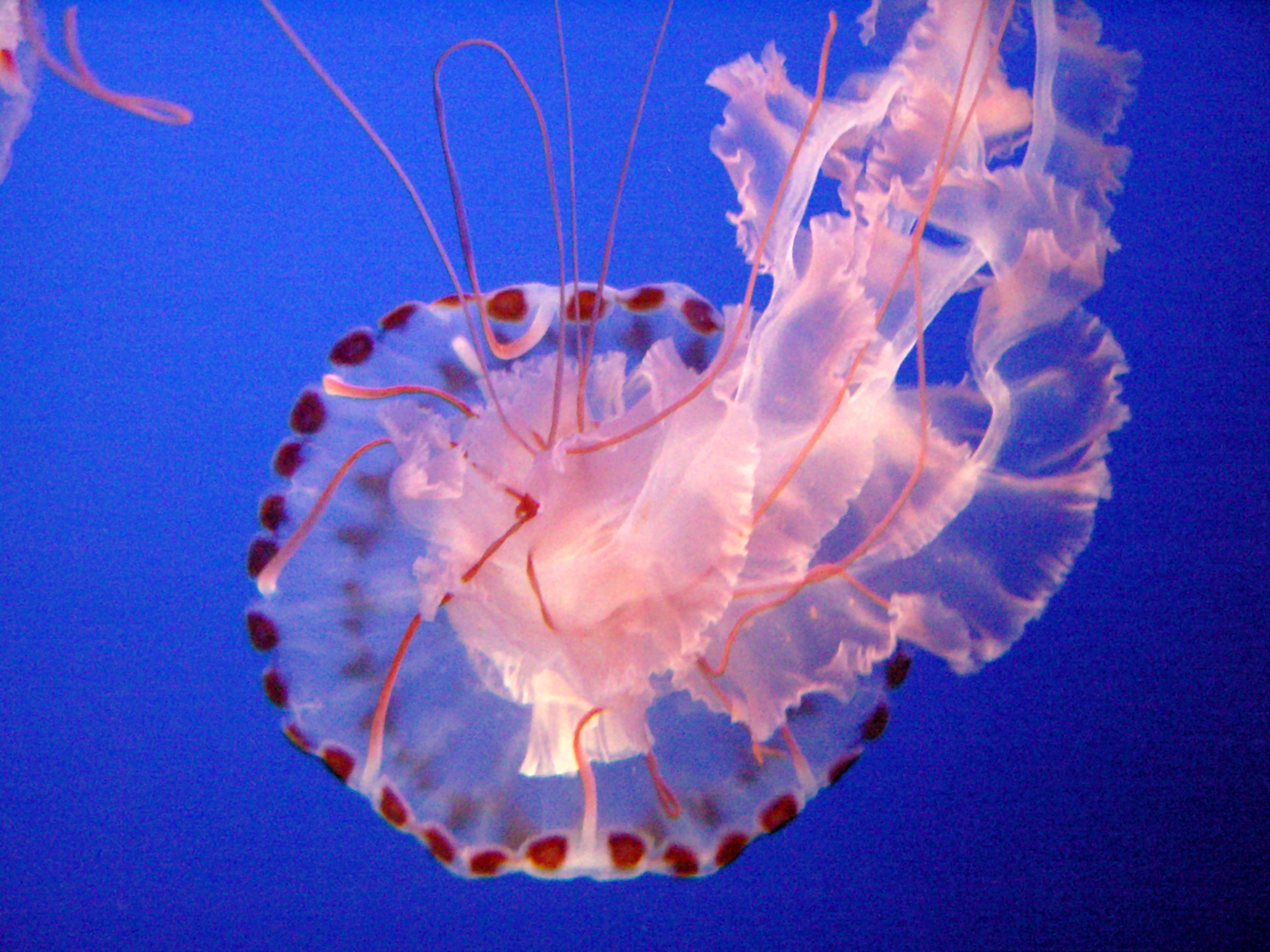
A purple-striped jellyfish at the Monterey Bay Aquarium

=== Phylogeny ===
==== Definition ====
The term jellyfish broadly corresponds to medusae, that is, a life-cycle stage in the Medusozoa. The American evolutionary biologist Paulyn Cartwright gives the following general definition:

Typically, medusozoan cnidarians have a pelagic, predatory jellyfish stage in their life cycle; staurozoans are the exceptions [as they are stalked].

The Merriam-Webster dictionary defines jellyfish as follows:

A free-swimming marine coelenterate that is the sexually reproducing form of a hydrozoan or scyphozoan and has a nearly transparent saucer-shaped body and extensible marginal tentacles studded with stinging cells.

Given that jellyfish is a common name, its mapping to biological groups is inexact. Some authorities have called the comb jellies and certain salps jellyfish, though other authorities state that neither of these are jellyfish, which they consider should be limited to certain groups within the medusozoa.

The non-medusozoan clades called jellyfish by some but not all authorities (both agreeing and disagreeing citations are given in each case) are indicated with "???" on the following cladogram of the animal kingdom:

- Animalia
  - Porifera
  - - **Ctenophora** (comb jellies) ???
    - - **Cnidaria** (includes jellyfish and other jellies)
      - Bilateria
        - Protostomia
        - Deuterostomia
          - Ambulacraria
          - Chordata
            - **Tunicata** (includes salps) ???
            - Vertebrata

==== Medusozoan jellyfish ====
Jellyfish are not a clade, as they include most of the Medusozoa, barring some of the Hydrozoa. The medusozoan groups included by authorities are indicated on the following phylogenetic tree by the presence of citations. Names of included jellyfish, in English where possible, are shown in boldface; the presence of a named and cited example indicates that at least that species within its group has been called a jellyfish.

- Cnidaria
  - Anthozoa (corals)
  - - Polypodiozoa and Myxozoa (parasitic cnidarians)
    - Medusozoa
      - Acraspeda
        - Staurozoa (**stalked jellyfish**)
        - Rhopaliophora
          - Cubozoa (**box jellyfish**)
          - Scyphozoa (**true jellyfish**)
            - **Discomedusae**
            - Coronatae (**crown jellyfish**)
      - Hydrozoa
        - - Aplanulata
          - - Siphonophorae
            - - Some **Leptothecata** e.g. crystal jelly
              - **Filifera** e.g. red paper lantern jellyfish
        - Trachylinae
          - **Limnomedusae**, e.g. flower hat jelly
          - **Narcomedusae**, e.g. cosmic jellyfish

=== Taxonomy ===
The subphylum Medusozoa includes all cnidarians with a medusa stage in their life cycle. The basic cycle is egg, planula larva, polyp, medusa, with the medusa being the sexual stage. The polyp stage is sometimes secondarily lost. The subphylum include the major taxa, Scyphozoa (large jellyfish), Cubozoa (box jellyfish) and Hydrozoa (small jellyfish), and excludes Anthozoa (corals and sea anemones). This suggests that the medusa form evolved after the polyps. Medusozoans have tetramerous symmetry, with parts in fours or multiples of four.

The four major classes of medusozoan Cnidaria are:

- Scyphozoa are sometimes called true jellyfish, though they are no more truly jellyfish than the others listed here. They have tetra-radial symmetry. Most have tentacles around the outer margin of the bowl-shaped bell, and long, oral arms around the mouth in the center of the subumbrella.
- Cubozoa (box jellyfish) have a (rounded) box-shaped bell, and their velarium assists them to swim more quickly. Box jellyfish may be related more closely to scyphozoan jellyfish than either are to the Hydrozoa.
- Hydrozoa medusae also have tetra-radial symmetry, nearly always have a velum (diaphragm used in swimming) attached just inside the bell margin, do not have oral arms, but a much smaller central stalk-like structure, the manubrium, with terminal mouth opening, and are distinguished by the absence of cells in the mesoglea. Hydrozoa show great diversity of lifestyle; some species maintain the polyp form for their entire life and do not form medusae at all (such as Hydra, which is hence not considered a jellyfish), and a few are entirely medusal and have no polyp form.
- Staurozoa (stalked jellyfish) are characterized by a medusa form that is generally sessile, oriented upside down and with a stalk emerging from the apex of the "calyx" (bell), which attaches to the substrate. At least some Staurozoa also have a polyp form that alternates with the medusoid portion of the life cycle. Until recently, Staurozoa were classified within the Scyphozoa.

There are over 200 species of Scyphozoa, about 50 species of Staurozoa, about 50 species of Cubozoa, and the Hydrozoa includes about 1000–1500 species that produce medusae, but many more species that do not.

=== Fossil history ===
Since jellyfish have no hard parts, fossils are rare. The oldest unambiguous fossil of a free-swimming medusa is Burgessomedusa from the mid-Cambrian Burgess Shale of Canada, which is likely either a stem group of box jellyfish (Cubozoa) or Acraspeda (the clade including Staurozoa, Cubozoa, and Scyphozoa). Other claimed records from the Cambrian of China and Utah in the United States are uncertain, and possibly represent ctenophores instead.

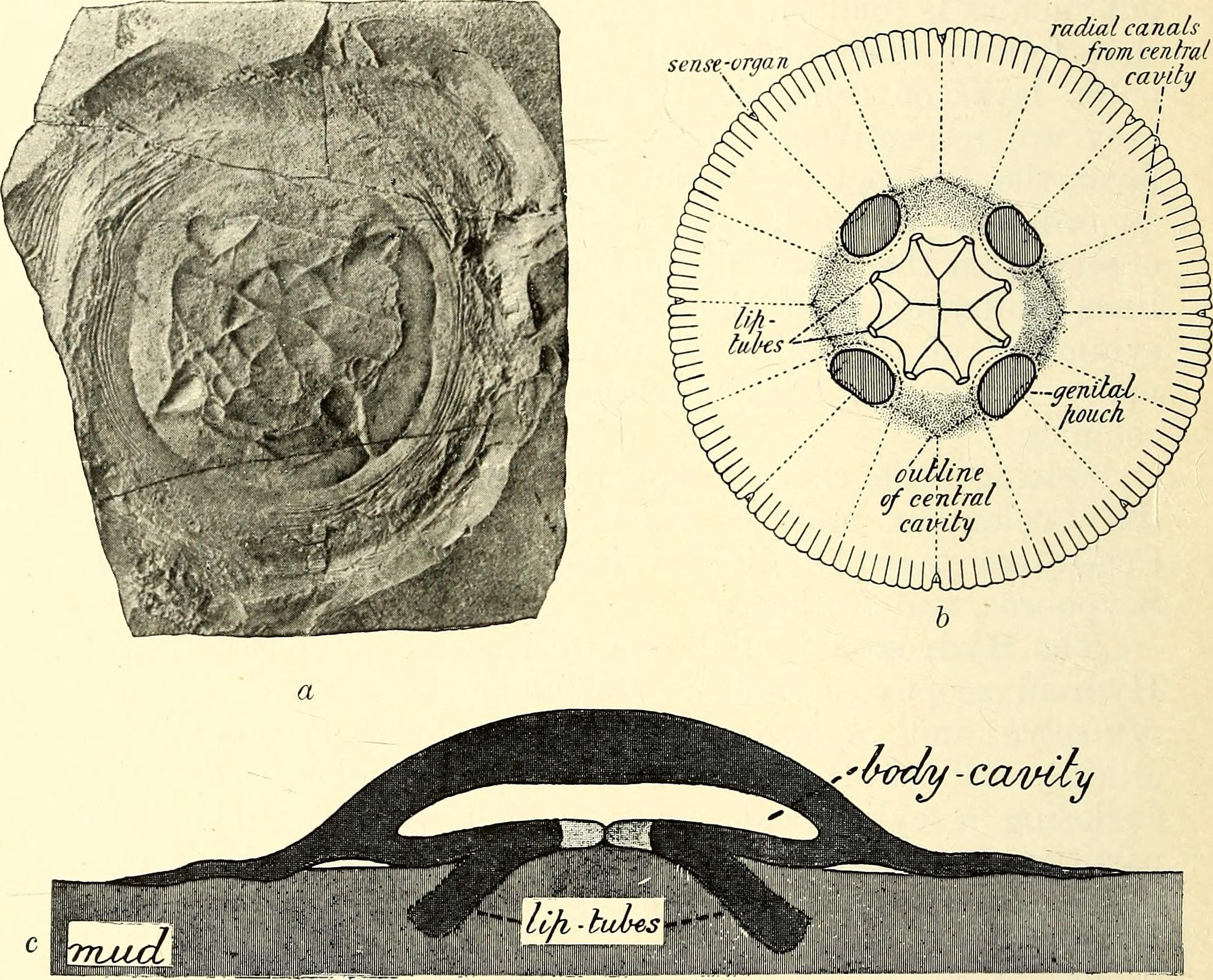
Fossil jellyfish, Rhizostomites lithographicus, one of the Scypho-medusae, from the Kimmeridgian (late Jurassic, 157 to 152 mya) of Solnhofen, Germany

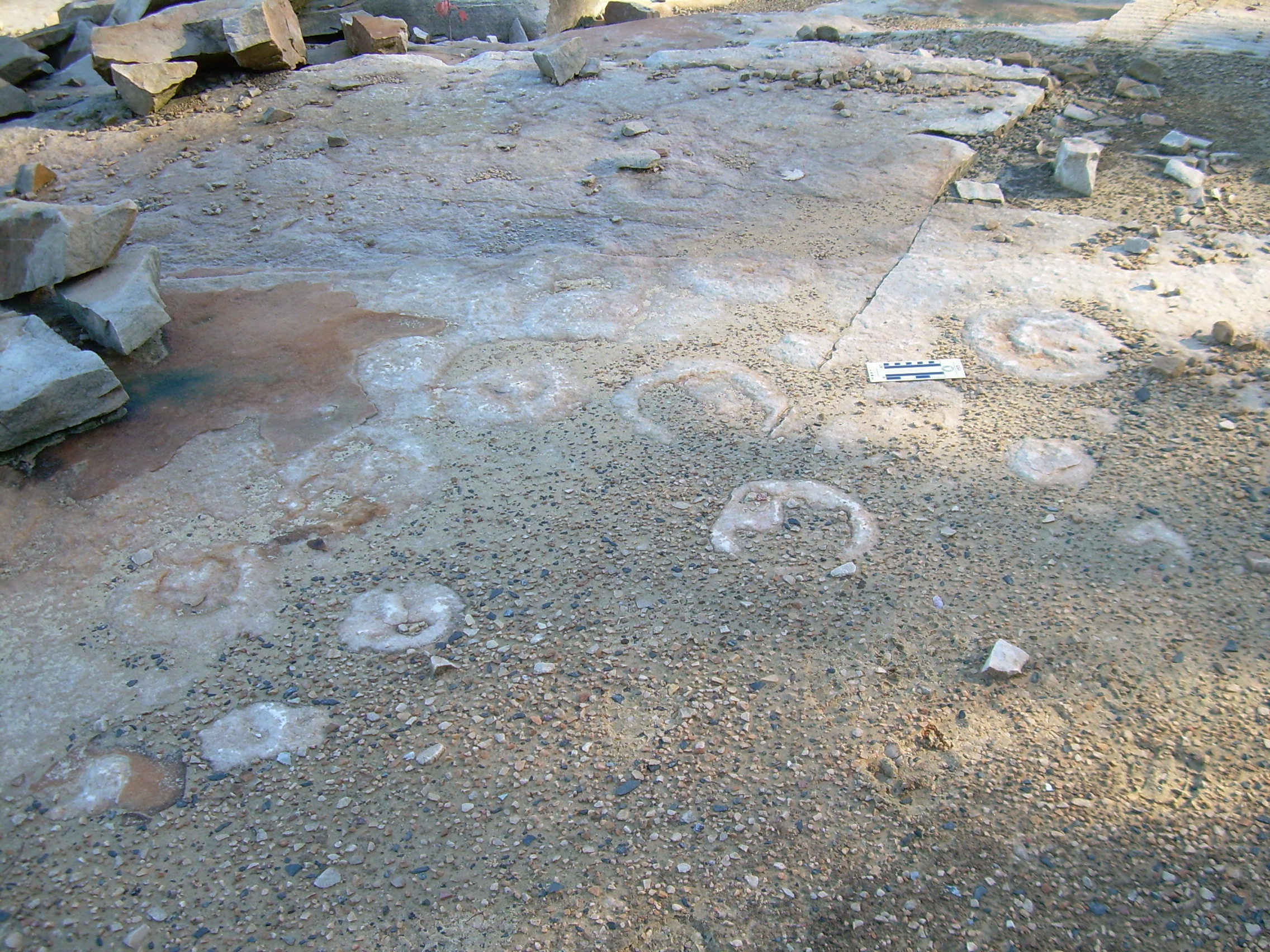
Stranded scyphozoans on a Cambrian fossil tidal flat at Blackberry Hill, Wisconsin

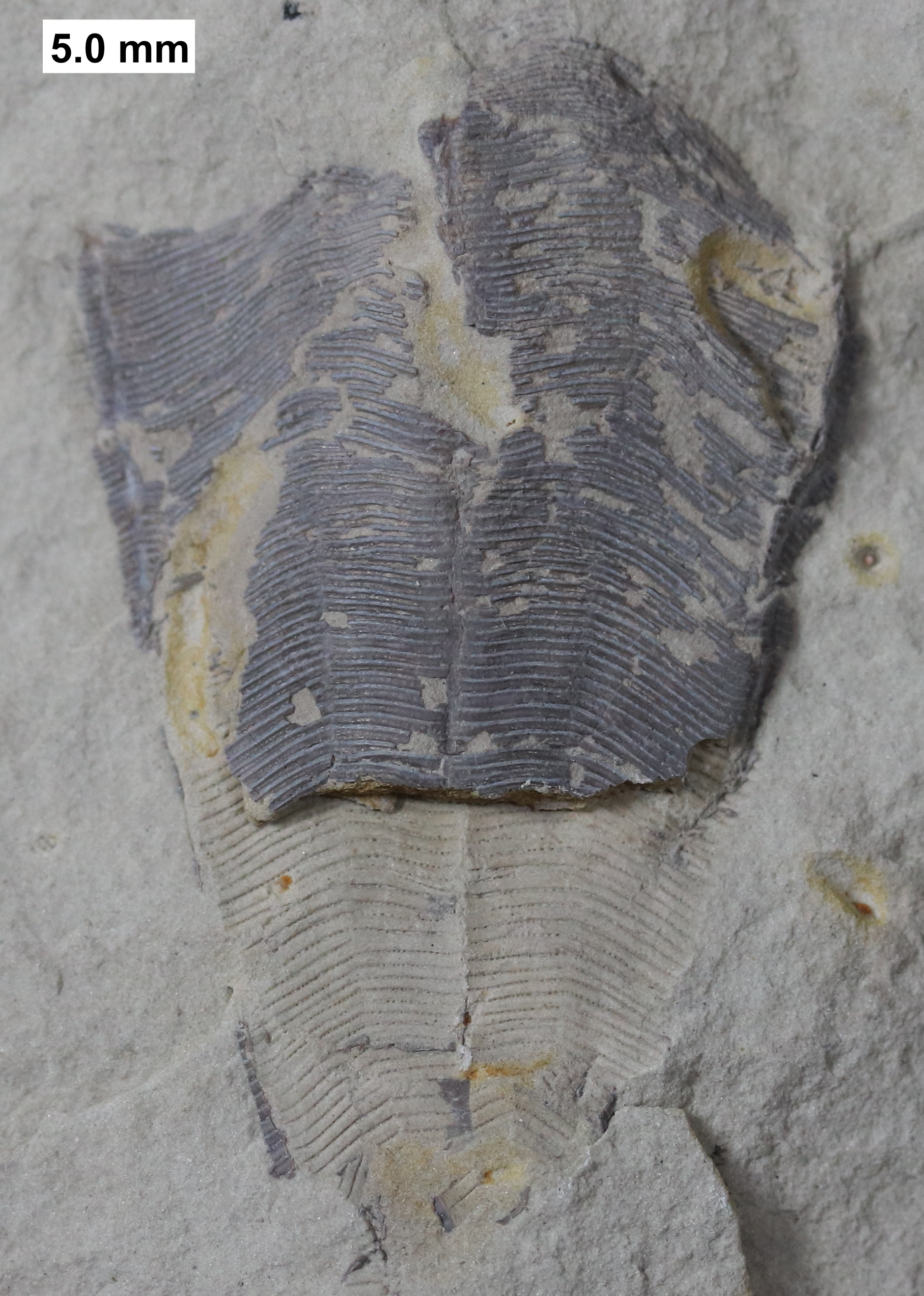
The conulariid Conularia milwaukeensis from the Middle Devonian of Wisconsin

== Anatomy ==
Labelled cross section of a jellyfish

The main feature of a true jellyfish is the umbrella-shaped bell. This is a hollow structure consisting of a mass of transparent jelly-like matter known as mesoglea, which forms the hydrostatic skeleton of the animal. The mesoglea is 95% or more composed of water, and also contains collagen and other fibrous proteins, as well as wandering amebocytes that can engulf debris and bacteria. The mesoglea is bordered by the epidermis on the outside and the gastrodermis on the inside. The edge of the bell is often divided into rounded lobes known as lappets, which allow the bell to flex. In the gaps or niches between the lappets are dangling rudimentary sense organs known as rhopalia, and the margin of the bell often bears tentacles.

Anatomy of a scyphozoan jellyfish

On the underside of the bell is the manubrium, a stalk-like structure hanging down from the centre, with the mouth, which also functions as the anus, at its tip. There are often four oral arms connected to the manubrium, streaming away into the water below. The mouth opens into the gastrovascular cavity, where digestion takes place and nutrients are absorbed. This is subdivided by four thick septa into a central stomach and four gastric pockets. The four pairs of gonads are attached to the septa, and close to them four septal funnels open to the exterior, perhaps allowing for better oxygenation of the gonads. Near the free edges of the septa, gastric filaments extend into the gastric cavity; these are armed with nematocysts and enzyme-producing cells and play a role in subduing and digesting the prey. In some scyphozoans, the gastric cavity is joined to radial canals which branch extensively and may join a marginal ring canal. Cilia in these canals circulate the fluid in a regular direction.

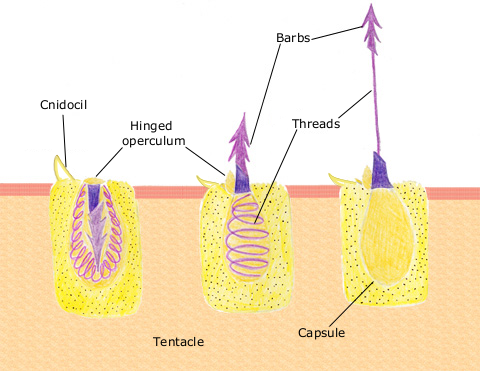
Discharge mechanism of a nematocyst

The box jellyfish is largely similar in structure. It has a squarish, box-like bell. A short pedalium or stalk hangs from each of the four lower corners. One or more long, slender tentacles are attached to each pedalium. The rim of the bell is folded inwards to form a shelf known as a velarium which restricts the bell's aperture and creates a powerful jet when the bell pulsates, allowing box jellyfish to swim faster than true jellyfish. Hydrozoans are also similar, usually with just four tentacles at the edge of the bell, although many hydrozoans are colonial and may not have a free-living medusal stage. In some species, a non-detachable bud known as a gonophore is formed that contains a gonad but is missing many other medusal features such as tentacles and rhopalia. Stalked jellyfish are attached to a solid surface by a basal disk, and resemble a polyp, the oral end of which has partially developed into a medusa with tentacle-bearing lobes and a central manubrium with four-sided mouth.

Most jellyfish do not have specialized systems for osmoregulation, respiration and circulation, and do not have a central nervous system. Nematocysts, which deliver the sting, are located mostly on the tentacles; true jellyfish also have them around the mouth and stomach. Jellyfish do not need a respiratory system because sufficient oxygen diffuses through the epidermis. They have limited control over their movement, but can navigate with the pulsations of the bell-like body; some species are active swimmers most of the time, while others largely drift. The rhopalia contain rudimentary sense organs which are able to detect light, water-borne vibrations, odour and orientation. A loose network of nerves called a "nerve net" is located in the epidermis. Although jellyfish are traditionally thought not to have a central nervous system, nerve net concentration and ganglion-like structures could be considered to constitute one in most species. A jellyfish detects stimuli, and transmits impulses both throughout the nerve net and around a circular nerve ring, to other nerve cells. The rhopalial ganglia contain pacemaker neurones which control swimming rate and direction.

In many species of jellyfish, the rhopalia include ocelli, light-sensitive organs able to tell light from dark. These are generally pigment spot ocelli, which have some of their cells pigmented. The rhopalia are suspended on stalks with heavy crystals of calcium carbonate at one end, acting like gyroscopes to orient the eyes skyward. Certain jellyfish look upward at the mangrove canopy while making a daily migration from mangrove swamps into the open lagoon, where they feed, and back again.

Box jellyfish have more advanced vision than the other groups. Each individual has 24 eyes, two of which are capable of seeing colour, and four parallel information processing areas that act in competition, supposedly making them one of the few kinds of animal to have a 360-degree view of its environment.

=== Box jellyfish eye ===
The study of jellyfish eye evolution is an intermediary to a better understanding of how visual systems evolved on Earth. Jellyfish exhibit immense variation in visual systems ranging from photoreceptive cell patches seen in simple photoreceptive systems to more derived complex eyes seen in box jellyfish. Major topics of jellyfish visual system research (with an emphasis on box jellyfish) include: the evolution of jellyfish vision from simple to complex visual systems), the eye morphology and molecular structures of box jellyfish (including comparisons to vertebrate eyes), and various uses of vision including task-guided behaviors and niche specialization.

==== Evolution ====
Experimental evidence for photosensitivity and photoreception in cnidarians antecedes the mid 1900s, and a rich body of research has since covered evolution of visual systems in jellyfish. Jellyfish visual systems range from simple photoreceptive cells to complex image-forming eyes. More ancestral visual systems incorporate extraocular vision (vision without eyes) that encompass numerous receptors dedicated to single-function behaviors. More derived visual systems comprise perception that is capable of multiple task-guided behaviors.

Although they lack a true brain, cnidarian jellyfish have a "ring" nervous system that plays a significant role in motor and sensory activity. This net of nerves is responsible for muscle contraction and movement and culminates the emergence of photosensitive structures. Across Cnidaria, there is large variation in the systems that underlie photosensitivity. Photosensitive structures range from non-specialized groups of cells, to more "conventional" eyes similar to those of vertebrates. The general evolutionary steps to develop complex vision include (from more ancestral to more derived states): non-directional photoreception, directional photoreception, low-resolution vision, and high-resolution vision. Increased habitat and task complexity has favored the high-resolution visual systems common in derived cnidarians such as box jellyfish.

Basal visual systems observed in various cnidarians exhibit photosensitivity representative of a single task or behavior. Extraocular photoreception (a form of non-directional photoreception), is the most basic form of light sensitivity and guides a variety of behaviors among cnidarians. It can function to regulate circadian rhythm (as seen in eyeless hydrozoans) and other light-guided behaviors responsive to the intensity and spectrum of light. Extraocular photoreception can function additionally in positive phototaxis (in planula larvae of hydrozoans), as well as in avoiding harmful amounts of UV radiation via negative phototaxis. Directional photoreception (the ability to perceive direction of incoming light) allows for more complex phototactic responses to light, and likely evolved by means of membrane stacking. The resulting behavioral responses can range from guided spawning events timed by moonlight to shadow responses for potential predator avoidance. Light-guided behaviors are observed in numerous scyphozoans including the common moon jelly, Aurelia aurita, which migrates in response to changes in ambient light and solar position even though they lack proper eyes.

The low-resolution visual system of box jellyfish is more derived than directional photoreception, and thus box jellyfish vision represents the most basic form of true vision in which multiple directional photoreceptors combine to create the first imaging and spatial resolution. This is different from the high-resolution vision that is observed in camera or compound eyes of vertebrates and cephalopods that rely on focusing optics. Critically, the visual systems of box jellyfish are responsible for guiding multiple tasks or behaviors in contrast to less derived visual systems in other jellyfish that guide single behavioral functions. These behaviors include phototaxis based on sunlight (positive) or shadows (negative), obstacle avoidance, and control of swim-pulse rate.

Box jellyfish possess "proper eyes" (similar to vertebrates) that allow them to inhabit environments that lesser derived medusae cannot. In fact, they are considered the only class in the clade Medusozoa that have behaviors necessitating spatial resolution and genuine vision. However, the lens in their eyes are more functionally similar to cup-eyes exhibited in low-resolution organisms, and have very little to no focusing capability. The lack of the ability to focus is due to the focal length exceeding the distance to the retina, thus generating unfocused images and limiting spatial resolution. The visual system is still sufficient for box jellyfish to produce an image to help with tasks such as object avoidance.

==== Utility as a model organism ====
Box jellyfish eyes are a visual system that is sophisticated in numerous ways. These intricacies include the considerable variation within the morphology of box jellyfishes' eyes (including their task/behavior specification), and the molecular makeup of their eyes including: photoreceptors, opsins, lenses, and synapses. The comparison of these attributes to more derived visual systems can allow for a further understanding of how the evolution of more derived visual systems may have occurred, and puts into perspective how box jellyfish can play the role as an evolutionary/developmental model for all visual systems.

===== Characteristics =====
Box jellyfish visual systems are both diverse and complex, comprising multiple photosystems. There is likely considerable variation in visual properties between species of box jellyfish given the significant inter-species morphological and physiological variation. Eyes tend to differ in size and shape, along with number of receptors (including opsins), and physiology across species of box jellyfish.

Box jellyfish have a series of intricate lensed eyes that are similar to those of more derived multicellular organisms such as vertebrates. Their 24 eyes fit into four different morphological categories. These categories consist of two large, morphologically different medial eyes (a lower and upper lensed eye) containing spherical lenses, a lateral pair of pigment slit eyes, and a lateral pair of pigment pit eyes. The eyes are situated on rhopalia (small sensory structures) which serve sensory functions of the box jellyfish and arise from the cavities of the exumbrella (the surface of the body) on the side of the bells of the jellyfish. The two large eyes are located on the mid-line of the club and are considered complex because they contain lenses. The four remaining eyes lie laterally on either side of each rhopalia and are considered simple. The simple eyes are observed as small invaginated cups of epithelium that have developed pigmentation. The larger of the complex eyes contains a cellular cornea created by a mono ciliated epithelium, cellular lens, homogenous capsule to the lens, vitreous body with prismatic elements, and a retina of pigmented cells. The smaller of the complex eyes is said to be slightly less complex given that it lacks a capsule but otherwise contains the same structure as the larger eye.

Box jellyfish have multiple photosystems that comprise different sets of eyes. Evidence includes immunocytochemical and molecular data that show photopigment differences among the different morphological eye types, and physiological experiments done on box jellyfish to suggest behavioral differences among photosystems. Each individual eye type constitutes photosystems that work collectively to control visually guided behaviors.

Box jellyfish eyes primarily use c-PRCs (ciliary photoreceptor cells) similar to that of vertebrate eyes. These cells undergo phototransduction cascades (process of light absorption by photoreceptors) that are triggered by c-opsins. Available opsin sequences suggest that there are two types of opsins possessed by all cnidarians including an ancient phylogenetic opsin, and a sister ciliary opsin to the c-opsins group. Box jellyfish could have both ciliary and cnidops (cnidarian opsins), which is something not previously believed to appear in the same retina. Nevertheless, it is not entirely evident whether cnidarians possess multiple opsins that are capable of having distinctive spectral sensitivities.

===== Comparison with other organisms =====
Comparative research on genetic and molecular makeup of box jellyfishes' eyes versus more derived eyes seen in vertebrates and cephalopods focuses on: lenses and crystallin composition, synapses, and Pax genes and their implied evidence for shared primordial (ancestral) genes in eye evolution.

Box jellyfish eyes are said to be an evolutionary/developmental model of all eyes based on their evolutionary recruitment of crystallins and Pax genes. Research done on box jellyfish including Tripedalia cystophora has suggested that they possess a single Pax gene, PaxB. PaxB functions by binding to crystallin promoters and activating them. PaxB in situ hybridization resulted in PaxB expression in the lens, retina, and statocysts. These results and the rejection of the prior hypothesis that Pax6 was an ancestral Pax gene in eyes has led to the conclusion that PaxB was a primordial gene in eye evolution, and that the eyes of all organisms likely share a common ancestor.

The lens structure of box jellyfish appears very similar to those of other organisms, but the crystallins are distinct in both function and appearance. Weak reactions were seen within the sera and there were very weak sequence similarities within the crystallins among vertebrate and invertebrate lenses. This is likely due to differences in lower molecular weight proteins and the subsequent lack of immunological reactions with antisera that other organisms' lenses exhibit.

All four of the visual systems of box jellyfish species investigated with detail (Carybdea marsupialis, Chiropsalmus quadrumanus, Tamoya haplonema and Tripedalia cystophora) have invaginated synapses, but only in the upper and lower lensed eyes. Different densities were found between the upper and lower lenses, and between species. Four types of chemical synapses have been discovered within the rhopalia which could help in understanding neural organization including: clear unidirectional, dense-core unidirectional, clear bidirectional, and clear and dense-core bidirectional. The synapses of the lensed eyes could be useful as markers to learn more about the neural circuit in box jellyfish retinal areas.

==== Evolution as a response to natural stimuli ====
The primary adaptive responses to environmental variation observed in box jellyfish eyes include pupillary constriction speeds in response to light environments, as well as photoreceptor tuning and lens adaptations to better respond to shifts between light environments and darkness. Some box jellyfish species' eyes appear to have evolved more focused vision in response to their habitat.

Pupillary contraction appears to have evolved in response to variation in the light environment across ecological niches across three species of box jellyfish (Chironex fleckeri, Chiropsella bronzie, and Carukia barnesi). Behavioral studies suggest that faster pupil contraction rates allow for greater object avoidance, and in fact, species with more complex habitats exhibit faster rates. Ch. bronzie inhabit shallow beach fronts that have low visibility and very few obstacles, thus, faster pupil contraction in response to objects in their environment is not important. Ca. barnesi and Ch. fleckeri are found in more three-dimensionally complex environments like mangroves with an abundance of natural obstacles, where faster pupil contraction is more adaptive. Behavioral studies support the idea that faster pupillary contraction rates assist with obstacle avoidance as well as depth adjustments in response to differing light intensities.

Light/dark adaptation via pupillary light reflexes is an additional form of an evolutionary response to the light environment. This relates to the pupil's response to shifts between light intensity (generally from sunlight to darkness). In the process of light/dark adaptation, the upper and lower lens eyes of different box jellyfish species vary in specific function. The lower lens-eyes contain pigmented photoreceptors and long pigment cells with dark pigments that migrate on light/dark adaptation, while the upper-lens eyes play a concentrated role in light direction and phototaxis given that they face upward towards the water surface (towards the sun or moon). The upper lens of Ch. bronzie does not exhibit any considerable optical power while Tr. cystophora (a box jellyfish species that tends to live in mangroves) does. The ability to use light to visually guide behavior is not of as much importance to Ch. bronzie as it is to species in more obstacle-filled environments. Differences in visually guided behavior serve as evidence that species that share the same number and structure of eyes can exhibit differences in how they control behavior.

== Largest and smallest ==
Jellyfish range from about one millimeter in bell height and diameter, to nearly 2 metres (6 1/2 ft) in bell height and diameter; the tentacles and mouth parts usually extend beyond this bell dimension.

The smallest jellyfish are the peculiar creeping jellyfish in the genera Staurocladia and Eleutheria, which have bell disks from 0.5 millimetres (1/32 in) to a few millimeters in diameter, with short tentacles that extend out beyond this, which these jellyfish use to move across the surface of seaweed or the bottoms of rocky pools; many of these tiny creeping jellyfish cannot be seen in the field without a hand lens or microscope. They can reproduce asexually by fission (splitting in half). Other very small jellyfish, which have bells about one millimeter, are the hydromedusae of many species that have just been released from their parent polyps; some of these live only a few minutes before shedding their gametes in the plankton and then dying, while others will grow in the plankton for weeks or months. The hydromedusae Cladonema radiatum and Cladonema californicum are also very small, living for months, yet never growing beyond a few mm in bell height and diameter.

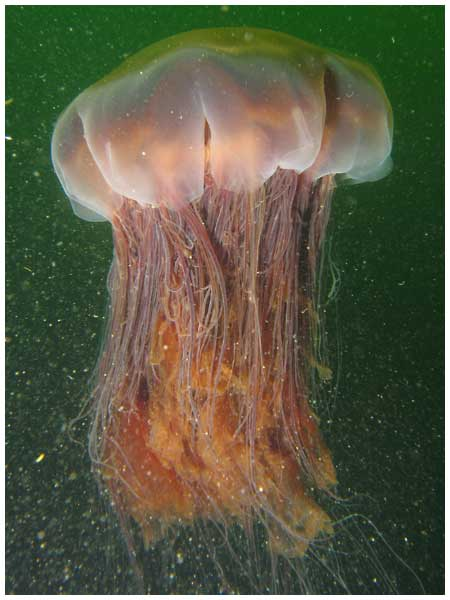
The lion's mane jellyfish (Cyanea capillata) is one of the largest species.

The lion's mane jellyfish, Cyanea capillata, was long-cited as the largest jellyfish, and arguably the longest animal in the world, with fine, thread-like tentacles that may extend up to 36.5 m (119 ft 9 in) long (though most are nowhere near that large). They have a moderately painful, but rarely fatal, sting. The increasingly common giant Nomura's jellyfish, Nemopilema nomurai, found in some, but not all years in the waters of Japan, Korea and China in summer and autumn is another candidate for "largest jellyfish", in terms of diameter and weight, since the largest Nomura's jellyfish in late autumn can reach 2 m (6 ft 7 in) in bell (body) diameter and about 200 kg (440 lb) in weight, with average specimens frequently reaching 0.9 m (2 ft 11 in) in bell diameter and about 150 kg (330 lb) in weight. The large bell mass of the giant Nomura's jellyfish can dwarf a diver and is nearly always much greater than the Lion's Mane, whose bell diameter can reach 1 m (3 ft 3 in).

The rarely encountered deep-sea jellyfish Stygiomedusa gigantea is another candidate for "largest jellyfish", with its thick, massive bell up to 100 cm (3 ft 3 in) wide, and four thick, "strap-like" oral arms extending up to 6 m (19 1/2 ft) in length, very different from the typical fine, threadlike tentacles that rim the umbrella of more-typical-looking jellyfish, including the Lion's Mane.

Desmonema glaciale, which lives in the Antarctic region, can reach a very large size (several meters). Purple-striped jelly (Chrysaora colorata) can also be extremely long (up to 15 feet).

== Life history and behavior ==
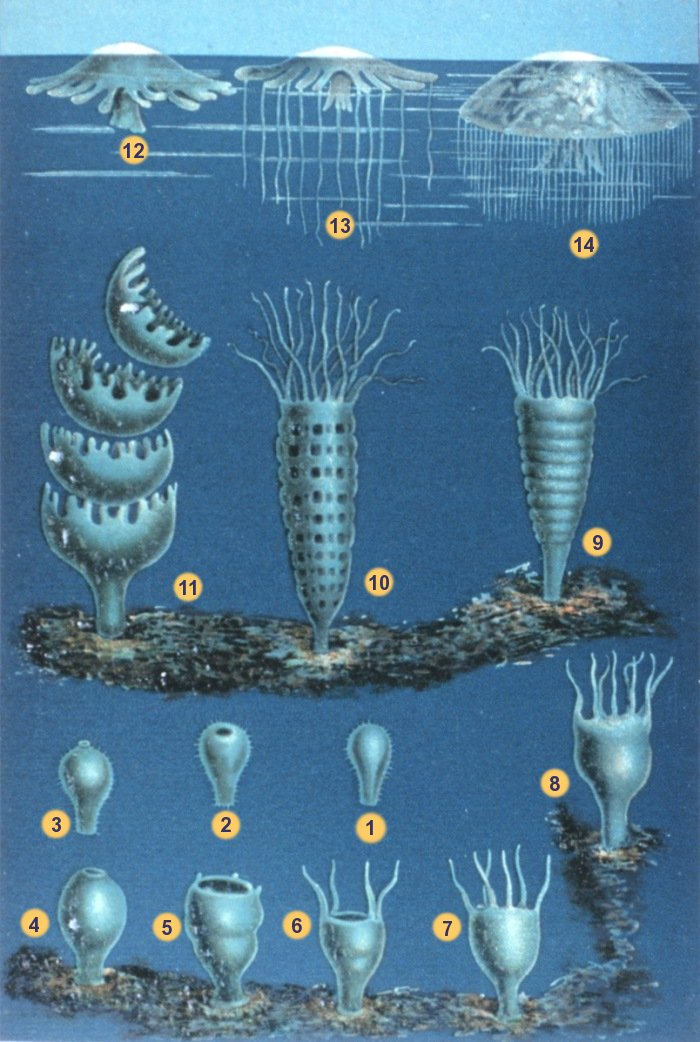
The developmental stages of scyphozoan jellyfish's life cycle: 1–3 Larva searches for site 4–8 Polyp grows 9–11 Polyp strobilates 12–14 Medusa grows

=== Life cycle ===
Jellyfish have a complex life cycle which includes both sexual and asexual phases, with the medusa being the sexual stage in most instances. Sperm fertilize eggs, which develop into larval planulae, become polyps, bud into ephyrae and then transform into adult medusae. In some species certain stages may be skipped.

Upon reaching adult size, jellyfish spawn regularly if there is a sufficient supply of food. In most species, spawning is controlled by light, with all individuals spawning at about the same time of day; in many instances this is at dawn or dusk. Jellyfish are usually either male or female (with occasional hermaphrodites). In most cases, adults release sperm and eggs into the surrounding water, where the unprotected eggs are fertilized and develop into larvae. In a few species, the sperm swim into the female's mouth, fertilizing the eggs within her body, where they remain during early development stages. In moon jellies, the eggs lodge in pits on the oral arms, which form a temporary brood chamber for the developing planula larvae.

The planula is a small larva covered with cilia. When sufficiently developed, it settles onto a firm surface and develops into a polyp. The polyp generally consists of a small stalk topped by a mouth that is ringed by upward-facing tentacles. The polyps resemble those of closely related anthozoans, such as sea anemones and corals. The jellyfish polyp may be sessile, living on the bottom of boat hulls or other substrates, or it may be free-floating or attached to tiny bits of free-living plankton or rarely, fish or other invertebrates. Polyps may be solitary or colonial. Most polyps are only millimetres in diameter and feed continuously. The polyp stage may last for years.

After an interval and stimulated by seasonal or hormonal changes, the polyp may begin reproducing asexually by budding and, in the Scyphozoa, is called a segmenting polyp, or a scyphistoma. Budding produces more scyphistomae and also ephyrae. Budding sites vary by species; from the tentacle bulbs, the manubrium (above the mouth), or the gonads of hydromedusae. In a process known as strobilation, the polyp's tentacles are reabsorbed and the body starts to narrow, forming transverse constrictions, in several places near the upper extremity of the polyp. These deepen as the constriction sites migrate down the body, and separate segments known as ephyra detach. These are free-swimming precursors of the adult medusa stage, which is the life stage that is typically identified as a jellyfish. The ephyrae, usually only a millimeter or two across initially, swim away from the polyp and grow. Limnomedusae polyps can asexually produce a creeping frustule larval form, which crawls away before developing into another polyp. A few species can produce new medusae by budding directly from the medusan stage. Some hydromedusae reproduce by fission.

=== Lifespan ===
Little is known of the life histories of many jellyfish as the places on the seabed where the benthic forms of those species live have not been found. However, an asexually reproducing strobila form can sometimes live for several years, producing new medusae (ephyra larvae) each year.

An unusual species, Turritopsis dohrnii, formerly classified as Turritopsis nutricula, might be effectively immortal because of its ability under certain circumstances to transform from medusa back to the polyp stage, thereby escaping the death that typically awaits medusae after reproduction if they have not otherwise been eaten by some other organism. So far this reversal has been observed only in the laboratory.

=== Locomotion ===
Jellyfish locomotion is highly efficient. Muscles in the jellylike bell contract, setting up a start vortex and propelling the animal. When the contraction ends, the bell recoils elastically, creating a stop vortex with no extra energy input.

Jellyfish swimming, Monterey Bay Aquarium, California, USA

Using the moon jelly Aurelia aurita as an example, jellyfish have been shown to be the most energy-efficient swimmers of all animals. They move through the water by radially expanding and contracting their bell-shaped bodies to push water behind them. They pause between the contraction and expansion phases to create two vortex rings. Muscles are used for the contraction of the body, which creates the first vortex and pushes the animal forward, but the mesoglea is so elastic that the expansion is powered exclusively by relaxing the bell, which releases the energy stored from the contraction. Meanwhile, the second vortex ring starts to spin faster, sucking water into the bell and pushing against the centre of the body, giving a secondary and "free" boost forward. The mechanism, called passive energy recapture, only works in relatively small jellyfish moving at low speeds, allowing the animal to travel 30 percent farther on each swimming cycle. Jellyfish achieved a 48 percent lower cost of transport (food and oxygen intake versus energy spent in movement) than other animals in similar studies. One reason for this is that most of the gelatinous tissue of the bell is inactive, using no energy during swimming.

== Ecology ==
=== Diet ===
Jellyfish are, like other cnidarians, generally carnivorous (or parasitic), feeding on planktonic organisms, crustaceans, small fish, fish eggs and larvae, and other jellyfish, ingesting food and voiding undigested waste through the mouth. They hunt passively using their tentacles as drift lines, or sink through the water with their tentacles spread widely; the tentacles, which contain nematocysts to stun or kill the prey, may then flex to help bring it to the mouth. Their swimming technique also helps them to capture prey; when their bell expands it sucks in water which brings more potential prey within reach of the tentacles.

A few species such as Aglaura hemistoma are omnivorous, feeding on microplankton which is a mixture of zooplankton and phytoplankton (microscopic plants) such as dinoflagellates. Others harbour mutualistic algae (Zooxanthellae) in their tissues; the spotted jellyfish (Mastigias papua) is typical of these, deriving part of its nutrition from the products of photosynthesis, and part from captured zooplankton. The upside-down jellyfish (Cassiopea andromeda) also has a symbiotic relationship with microalgae, but captures tiny animals to supplement their diet. This is done by releasing tiny balls of living cells composed of mesoglea. These use cilia to drive them through water and stinging cells which stun the prey. The blobs also seem to have digestive capabilities.

=== Predation ===
Other species of jellyfish are among the most common and important jellyfish predators. Sea anemones may eat jellyfish that drift into their range. Other predators include tunas, sharks, swordfish, sea turtles and penguins. Jellyfish washed up on the beach are consumed by foxes, other terrestrial mammals and birds. In general however, few animals prey on jellyfish; they can broadly be considered to be top predators in the food chain. Once jellyfish have become dominant in an ecosystem, for example through overfishing which removes predators of jellyfish larvae, there may be no obvious way for the previous balance to be restored: they eat fish eggs and juvenile fish, and compete with fish for food, preventing fish stocks from recovering.

=== Symbiosis ===
Some small fish are immune to the stings of the jellyfish and live among the tentacles, serving as bait in a fish trap; they are safe from potential predators and are able to share the fish caught by the jellyfish. The cannonball jellyfish has a symbiotic relationship with ten different species of fish, and with the longnose spider crab, which lives inside the bell, sharing the jellyfish's food and nibbling its tissues.

=== Blooms ===
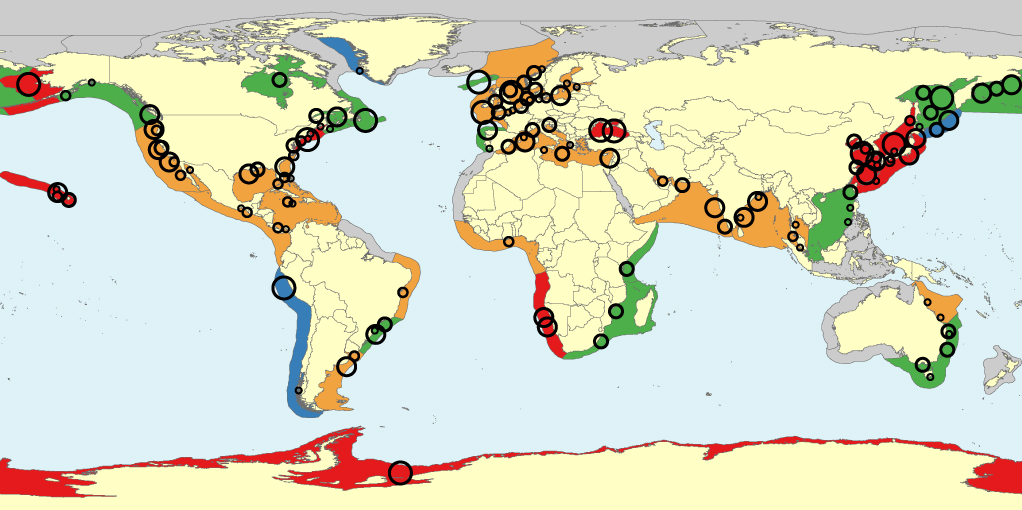
Map of population trends of native and invasive jellyfish. Circles represent data records; larger circles denote higher certainty of findings. Increase (high certainty) Increase (low certainty) Stable/variable Decrease No data

Jellyfish form large masses or blooms in certain environmental conditions of ocean currents, nutrients, sunshine, temperature, season, prey availability, reduced predation and oxygen concentration. Currents collect jellyfish together, especially in years with unusually high populations. Jellyfish can detect marine currents and swim against the current to congregate in blooms. Jellyfish are better able to survive in nutrient-rich, oxygen-poor water than competitors, and thus can feast on plankton without competition. Jellyfish may also benefit from saltier waters, as saltier waters contain more iodine, which is necessary for polyps to turn into jellyfish. Rising sea temperatures caused by climate change may also contribute to jellyfish blooms, because many species of jellyfish are able to survive in warmer waters. Increased nutrients from agricultural or urban runoff with nutrients including nitrogen and phosphorus compounds increase the growth of phytoplankton, causing eutrophication and algal blooms. When the phytoplankton die, they may create dead zones, so-called because they are hypoxic (low in oxygen). This in turn kills fish and other animals, but not jellyfish, allowing them to bloom. Jellyfish populations may be expanding globally as a result of land runoff and overfishing of their natural predators. Jellyfish are well placed to benefit from disturbance of marine ecosystems. They reproduce rapidly; they prey upon many species, while few species prey on them; and they feed via touch rather than visually, so they can feed effectively at night and in turbid waters. It may be difficult for fish stocks to re-establish themselves in marine ecosystems once they have become dominated by jellyfish, because jellyfish feed on plankton, which includes fish eggs and larvae.

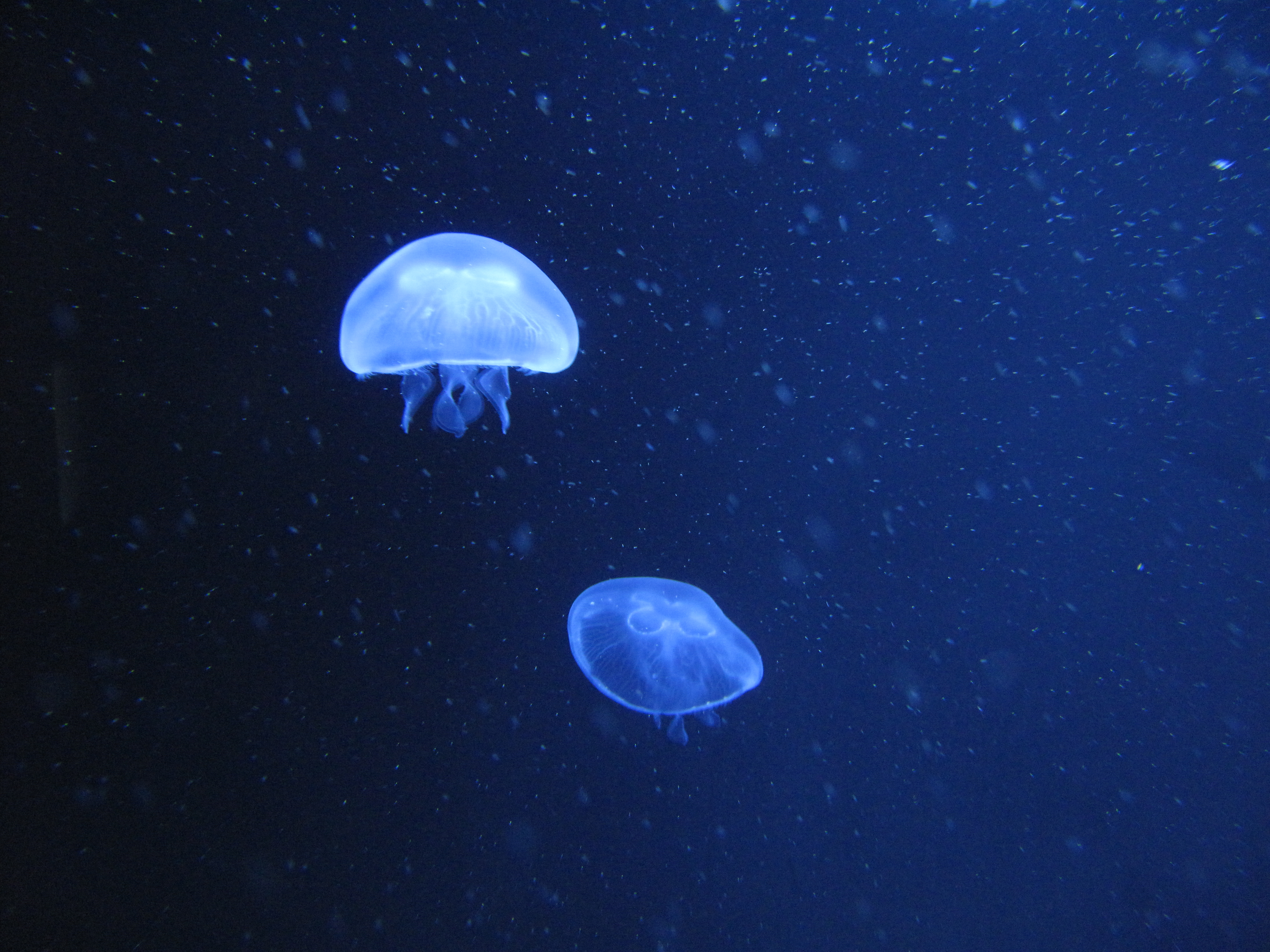
Moon jellyfishes can live in northern hemisphere seas, such as the Baltic Sea.

As suspected at the turn of this century, jellyfish blooms are increasing in frequency. Between 2013 and 2020 the Mediterranean Science Commission monitored on a weekly basis the frequency of such outbreaks in coastal waters from Morocco to the Black Sea, revealing a relatively high frequency of these blooms nearly all year round, with peaks observed from March to July and often again in the autumn. The blooms are caused by different jellyfish species, depending on their localisation within the Basin: one observes a clear dominance of Pelagia noctiluca and Velella velella outbreaks in the western Mediterranean, of Rhizostoma pulmo and Rhopilema nomadica outbreaks in the eastern Mediterranean, and of Aurelia aurita and Mnemiopsis leidyi outbreaks in the Black Sea.

Some jellyfish populations that have shown clear increases in the past few decades are invasive species, newly arrived from other habitats: examples include the Black Sea, Caspian Sea, Baltic Sea, central and eastern Mediterranean, Hawaii, and tropical and subtropical parts of the West Atlantic (including the Caribbean, Gulf of Mexico and Brazil).

Jellyfish blooms can have significant impact on community structure. Some carnivorous jellyfish species prey on zooplankton while others graze on primary producers. Reductions in zooplankton and ichthyoplankton due to a jellyfish bloom can ripple through the trophic levels. High-density jellyfish populations can outcompete other predators and reduce fish recruitment. Increased grazing on primary producers by jellyfish can also interrupt energy transfer to higher trophic levels.

During blooms, jellyfish significantly alter the nutrient availability in their environment. Blooms require large amounts of available organic nutrients in the water column to grow, limiting availability for other organisms. Some jellyfish have a symbiotic relationship with single-celled dinoflagellates, allowing them to assimilate inorganic carbon, phosphorus, and nitrogen creating competition for phytoplankton. Their large biomass makes them an important source of dissolved and particulate organic matter for microbial communities through excretion, mucus production, and decomposition. The microbes break down the organic matter into inorganic ammonium and phosphate. However, the low carbon availability shifts the process from production to respiration creating low oxygen areas making the dissolved inorganic nitrogen and phosphorus largely unavailable for primary production.

These blooms have very real impacts on industries. Jellyfish can outcompete fish by utilizing open niches in over-fished fisheries. Catch of jellyfish can strain fishing gear and lead to expenses relating to damaged gear. Power plants have been shut down due to jellyfish blocking the flow of cooling water. Blooms have also been harmful for tourism, causing a rise in stings and sometimes the closure of beaches.

Jellyfish form a component of jelly-falls, events where gelatinous zooplankton fall to the seafloor, providing food for the benthic organisms there. In temperate and subpolar regions, jelly-falls usually follow immediately after a bloom.

=== Habitats ===
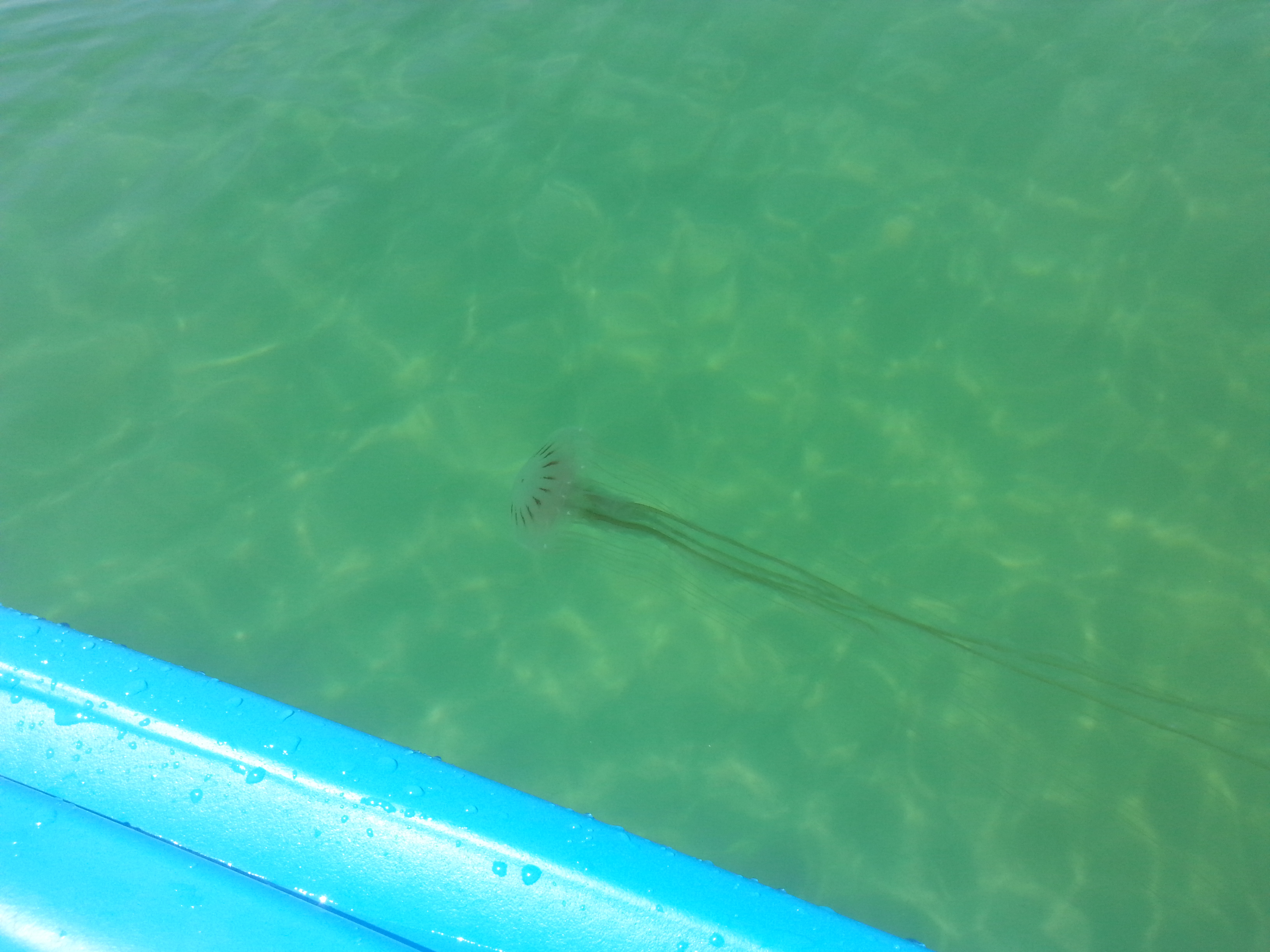
A common Scyphozoan jellyfish seen near beaches in the Florida Panhandle

Most jellyfish are marine animals, although a few hydromedusae inhabit freshwater. The best known freshwater example is the cosmopolitan hydrozoan jellyfish, Craspedacusta sowerbii. It is less than an inch (2.5 cm) in diameter, colorless and does not sting. Some jellyfish populations have become restricted to coastal saltwater lakes, such as Jellyfish Lake in Palau. Jellyfish Lake is a marine lake where millions of golden jellyfish (Mastigias spp.) migrate horizontally across the lake daily.

Although most jellyfish live well off the ocean floor and form part of the plankton, a few species are closely associated with the bottom for much of their lives and can be considered benthic. The upside-down jellyfish in the genus Cassiopea typically lie on the bottom of shallow lagoons where they sometimes pulsate gently with their umbrella top facing down. Even some deep-sea species of hydromedusae and scyphomedusae are usually collected on or near the bottom. All of the stauromedusae are found attached to either seaweed or rocky or other firm material on the bottom.

Some species explicitly adapt to tidal flux. In Roscoe Bay, jellyfish ride the current at ebb tide until they hit a gravel bar, and then descend below the current. They remain in still waters until the tide rises, ascending and allowing it to sweep them back into the bay. They also actively avoid fresh water from mountain snowmelt, diving until they find enough salt.

=== Parasites ===
Jellyfish are hosts to a wide variety of parasitic organisms. They act as intermediate hosts of endoparasitic helminths, with the infection being transferred to the definitive host fish after predation. Some digenean trematodes, especially species in the family Lepocreadiidae, use jellyfish as their second intermediate hosts. Fish become infected by the trematodes when they feed on infected jellyfish.

== Relation to humans ==
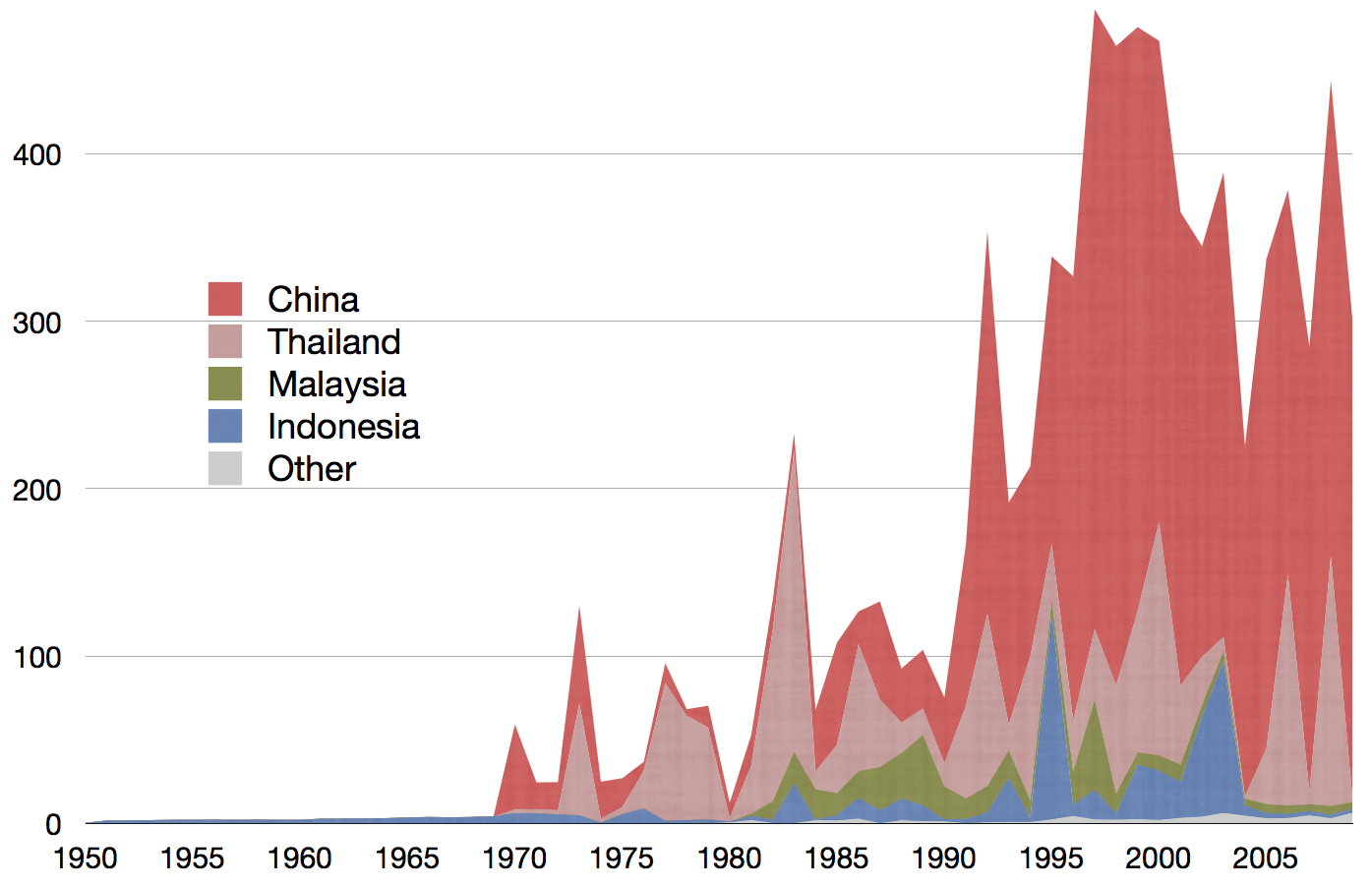
Global harvest of jellyfish in thousands of tonnes as reported by the FAO

=== Fisheries ===
Jellyfish have long been eaten in some parts of the world. Fisheries have begun harvesting the American cannonball jellyfish, Stomolophus meleagris, along the southern Atlantic coast of the United States and in the Gulf of Mexico for export to Asia.

Jellyfish are also harvested for their collagen, which is being investigated for use in a variety of applications including the treatment of rheumatoid arthritis.

Aquaculture and fisheries of other species often suffer severe losses – and so losses of productivity – due to jellyfish.

=== Products ===
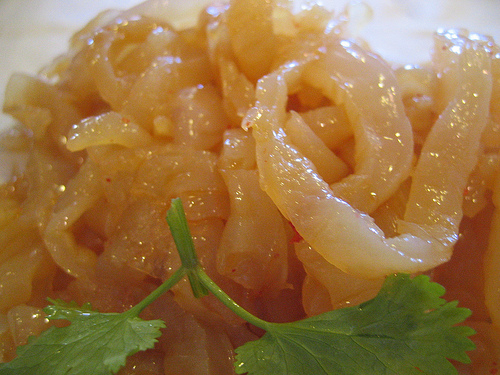
Rehydrated jellyfish strips with soy sauce and sesame oil

Aristotle stated in the Parts of Animals IV, 6 that jellyfish (sea-nettles) were eaten in wintertime in a fish stew.

In some countries, including China, Japan, and Korea, jellyfish are a delicacy. The jellyfish is dried to prevent spoiling. Only some 12 species of scyphozoan jellyfish belonging to the order Rhizostomeae are harvested for food, mostly in southeast Asia. Rhizostomes, especially Rhopilema esculentum in China (海蜇 hǎizhé, 'sea stingers') and Stomolophus meleagris (cannonball jellyfish) in the United States, are favored because of their larger and more rigid bodies and because their toxins are harmless to humans.

Traditional processing methods, carried out by a jellyfish master, involve a 20- to 40-day multi-phase procedure in which, after removing the gonads and mucous membranes, the umbrella and oral arms are treated with a mixture of table salt and alum, and compressed. Processing makes the jellyfish drier and more acidic, producing a crisp texture. Jellyfish prepared this way retain 7–10% of their original weight, and the processed product consists of approximately 94% water and 6% protein. Freshly processed jellyfish has a white, creamy color and turns yellow or brown during prolonged storage.

In China, processed jellyfish are desalted by soaking in water overnight and eaten cooked or raw. The dish is often served shredded with a dressing of oil, soy sauce, vinegar and sugar, or as a salad with vegetables. In Japan, cured jellyfish are rinsed, cut into strips and served with vinegar as an appetizer. Desalted, ready-to-eat products are also available.

=== Biotechnology ===
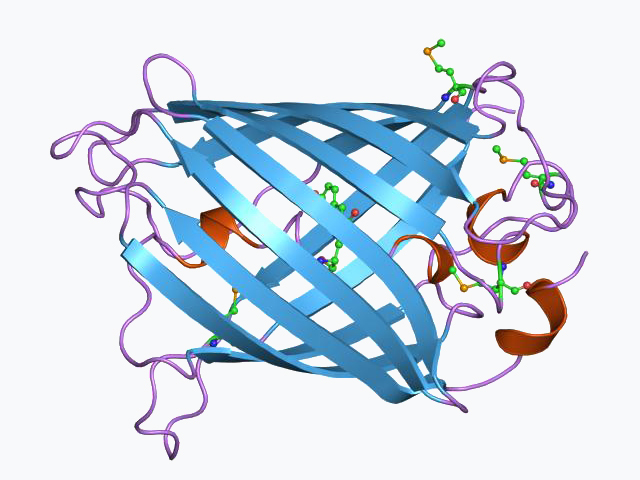
The hydromedusa Aequorea victoria was the source of green fluorescent protein, studied for its role in bioluminescence and later for use as a marker in genetic engineering.

Pliny the Elder reported in his Natural History that the slime of the jellyfish "Pulmo marinus" produced light when rubbed on a walking stick.

In 1961, Osamu Shimomura extracted green fluorescent protein (GFP) and another bioluminescent protein, called aequorin, from the large and abundant hydromedusa Aequorea victoria, while studying photoproteins that cause bioluminescence in this species. Three decades later, Douglas Prasher sequenced and cloned the gene for GFP. Martin Chalfie figured out how to use GFP as a fluorescent marker of genes inserted into other cells or organisms. Roger Tsien later chemically manipulated GFP to produce other fluorescent colors to use as markers. In 2008, Shimomura, Chalfie and Tsien won the Nobel Prize in Chemistry for their work with GFP. Man-made GFP became widely used as a fluorescent tag to show which cells or tissues express specific genes. The genetic engineering technique fuses the gene of interest to the GFP gene. The fused DNA is then put into a cell, to generate either a cell line or (via IVF techniques) an entire animal bearing the gene. In the cell or animal, the artificial gene turns on in the same tissues and the same time as the normal gene, making a fusion of the normal protein with GFP attached to the end, illuminating the animal or cell reveals what tissues express that protein—or at what stage of development. The fluorescence shows where the gene is expressed.

=== Aquarium display ===
Pacific sea nettles (Chrysaora fuscescens) in an aquarium exhibit

Jellyfish are displayed in many public aquariums. Often the tank's background is blue and the animals are illuminated by side light, increasing the contrast between the animal and the background. In natural conditions, many jellies are so transparent that they are nearly invisible. Jellyfish are not adapted to closed spaces. They depend on currents to transport them from place to place. Professional exhibits as in the Monterey Bay Aquarium feature precise water flows, typically in circular tanks to avoid trapping specimens in corners. The outflow is spread out over a large surface area and the inflow enters as a sheet of water in front of the outflow, so the jellyfish do not get sucked into it. As of 2009, jellyfish were becoming popular in home aquariums, where they require similar equipment.

=== Stings ===
Jellyfish are armed with nematocysts, a type of specialized stinging cell. Contact with a jellyfish tentacle can trigger millions of nematocysts to pierce the skin and inject venom, but only some species' venom causes an adverse reaction in humans. In a study published in Communications Biology, researchers found a jellyfish species called Cassiopea xamachana which when triggered will release tiny balls of cells that swim around the jellyfish stinging everything in their path. Researchers described these as "self-propelling microscopic grenades" and named them cassiosomes.

The effects of stings range from mild discomfort to extreme pain and death. Most jellyfish stings are not deadly, but stings of some box jellyfish (Irukandji jellyfish), such as the sea wasp, can be deadly. Stings may cause anaphylaxis (a form of shock), which can be fatal. Jellyfish kill 20 to 40 people a year in the Philippines alone. In 2006 the Spanish Red Cross treated 19,000 stung swimmers along the Costa Brava.

Vinegar (3–10% aqueous acetic acid) may help with box jellyfish stings but not the stings of the Portuguese man o' war. Clearing the area of jelly and tentacles reduces nematocyst firing. Scraping the affected skin, such as with the edge of a credit card, may remove remaining nematocysts. Once the skin has been cleaned of nematocysts, hydrocortisone cream applied locally reduces pain and inflammation. Antihistamines may help to control itching. Immunobased antivenins are used for serious box jellyfish stings.

In Elba Island and Corsica dittrichia viscosa is now used by residents and tourists to heal stings from jellyfish, bees and wasps by pressing fresh leaves on the skin with quick results.

Contrary to popular belief, urinating on a jellyfish sting does not alleviate pain, and has even been shown to make pain worse.

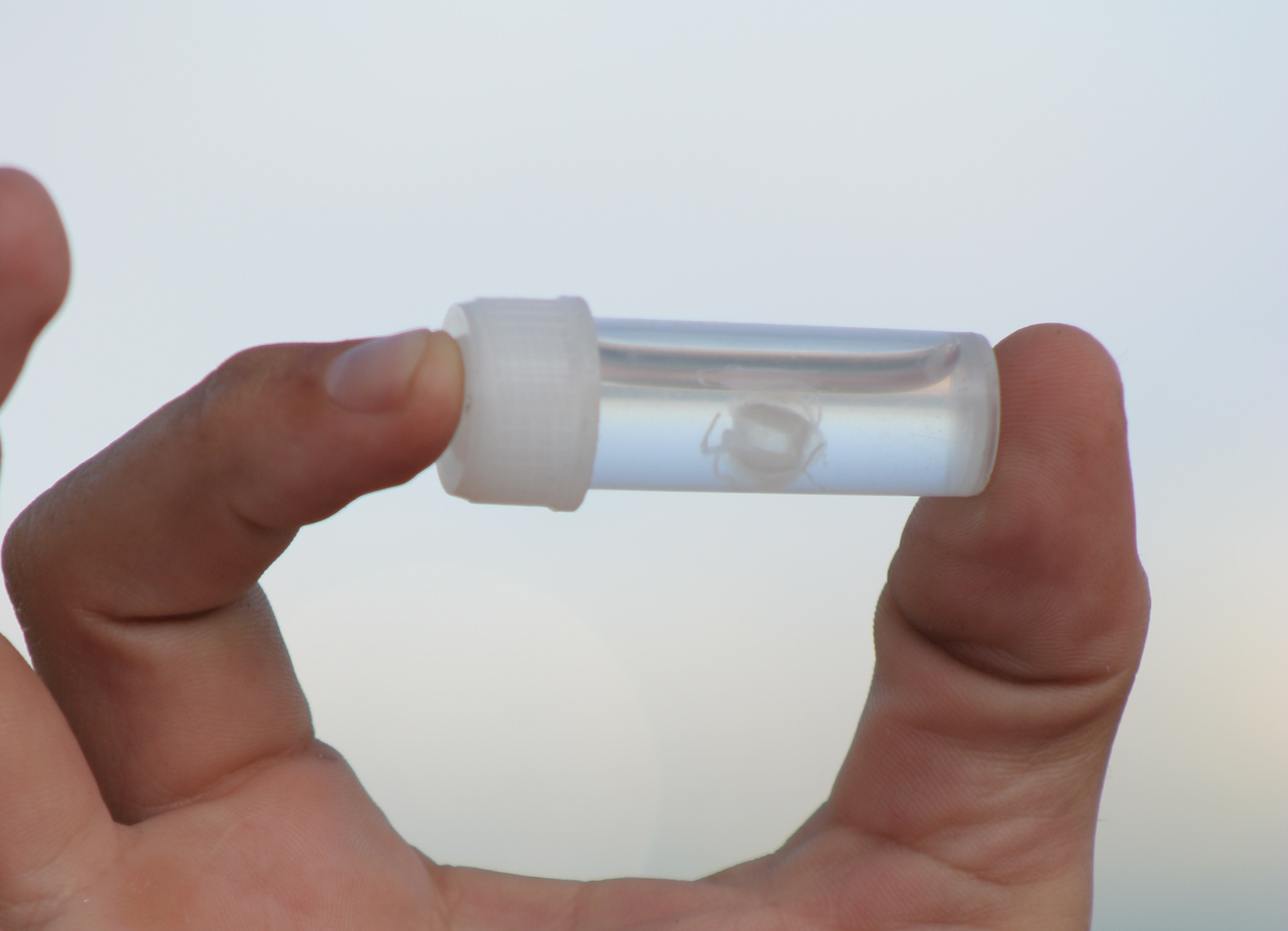
Box jellyfish are small and venomous.

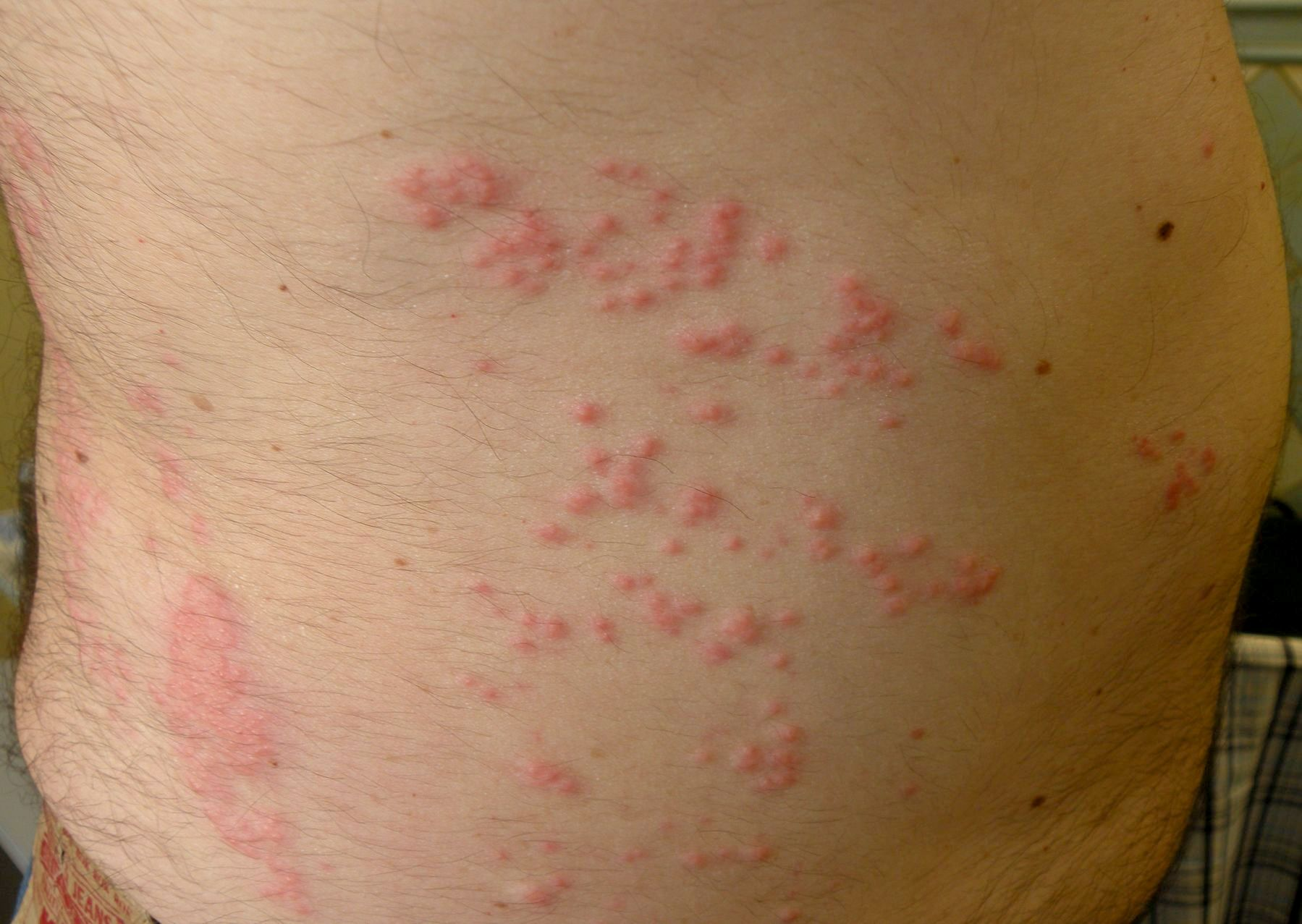
Jellyfish dermatitis

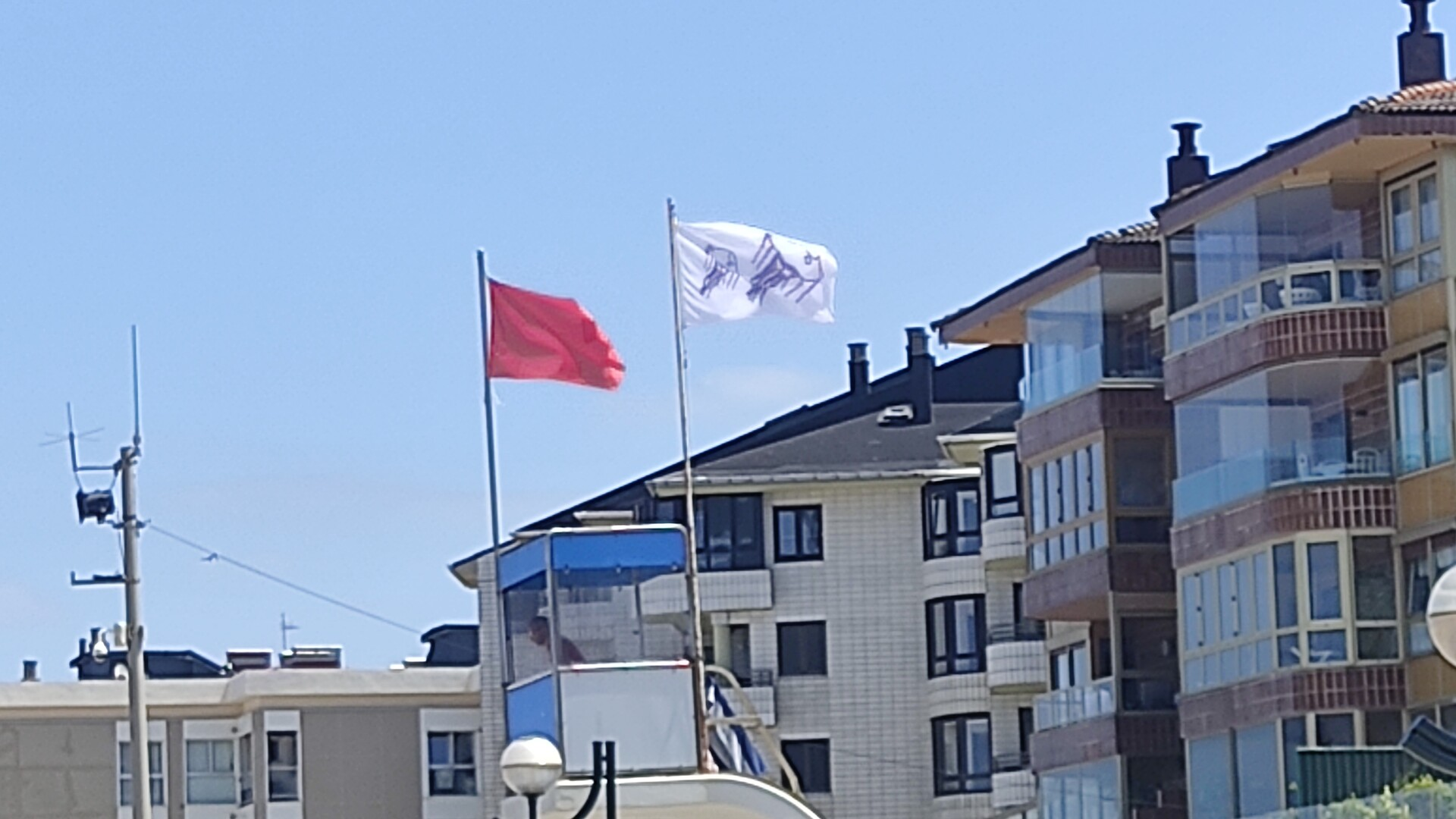
A flag in the beach of Zarautz alerting about the presence of jellyfish in the water

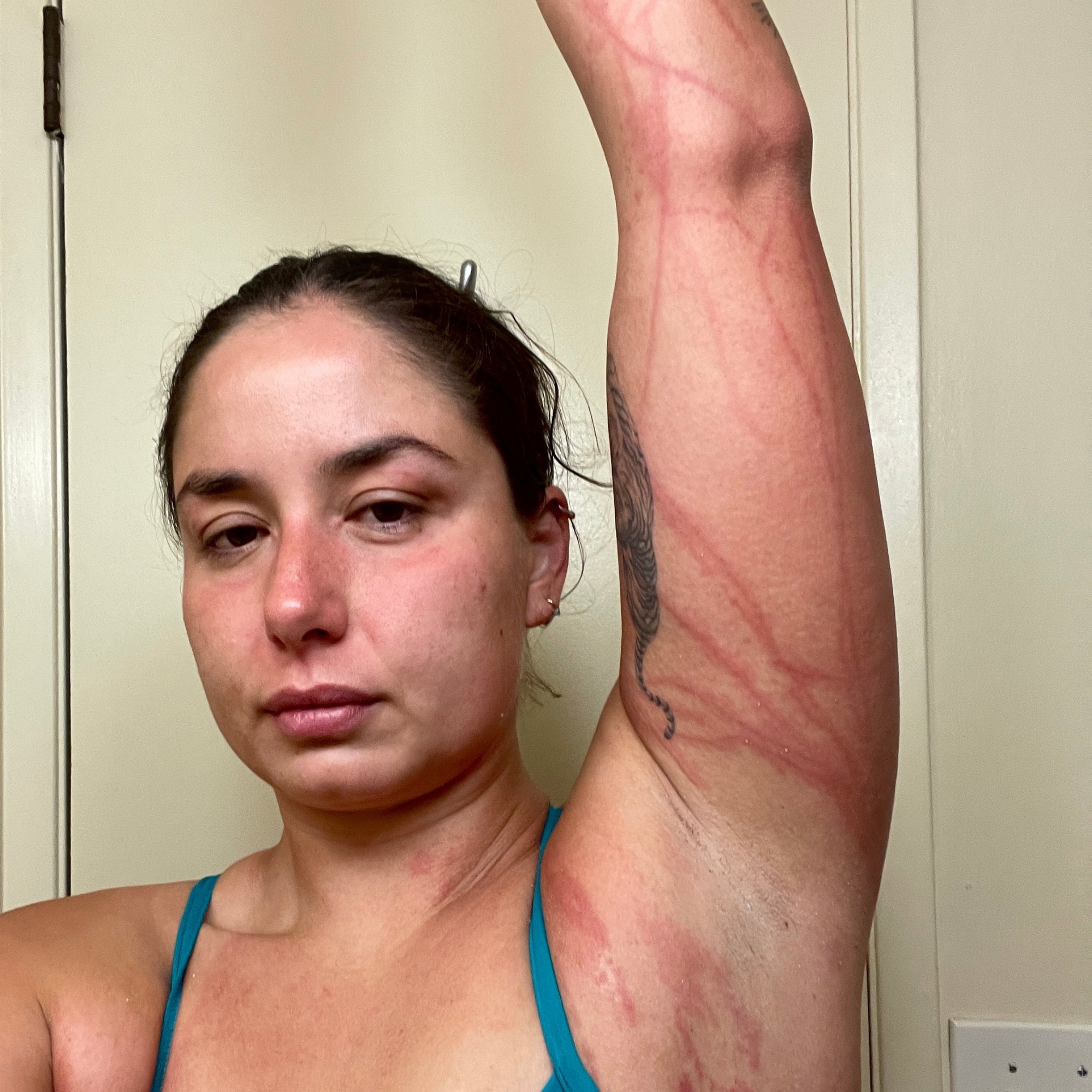
Bengisu Avcı in May 2024 after she came into contact with jellyfish while attempting to cross the Molokaʻi Channel in Hawaii

=== Mechanical issues ===
Jellyfish in large quantities can fill and split fishing nets and crush captured fish. They can clog cooling equipment, having disabled power stations in several countries; jellyfish caused a cascading blackout in the Philippines in 1999, as well as damaging the Diablo Canyon Power Plant in California in 2008. They can also stop desalination plants and ships' engines.

== See also ==
- Jellyfish dermatitis
- List of prehistoric medusozoans
- Ocean sunfish, a significant jellyfish predator
- Ctenophora
