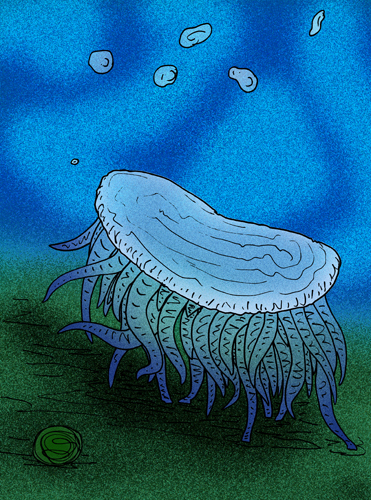
- Artists interpretation of G. tentaculatum

Scientific classification
- Domain: Eukaryota
- Kingdom: Animalia
- Phylum: Cnidaria
- Class: Hydrozoa (?)
- Genus: †Gelenoptron
- Species: †G. tentaculatum

Binomial name
- †Gelenoptron tentaculatum Conway Morris 1993

= Gelenoptron =

Gelenoptron Temporal range: Burgess Shale

Extinct genus of hydrozoans

Gelenoptron tentaculatum is an extinct, cnidarian-like organism represented by a single specimen and counterslab from the Burgess Shale. The holotype of G. tentaculatum was originally identified as a second specimen of the Animalia incertae sedis, Redoubtia, but established as a separate genus by Simon Conway Morris in 1993. A reflective shield recalls the float of chondrophore hydrozoans.
