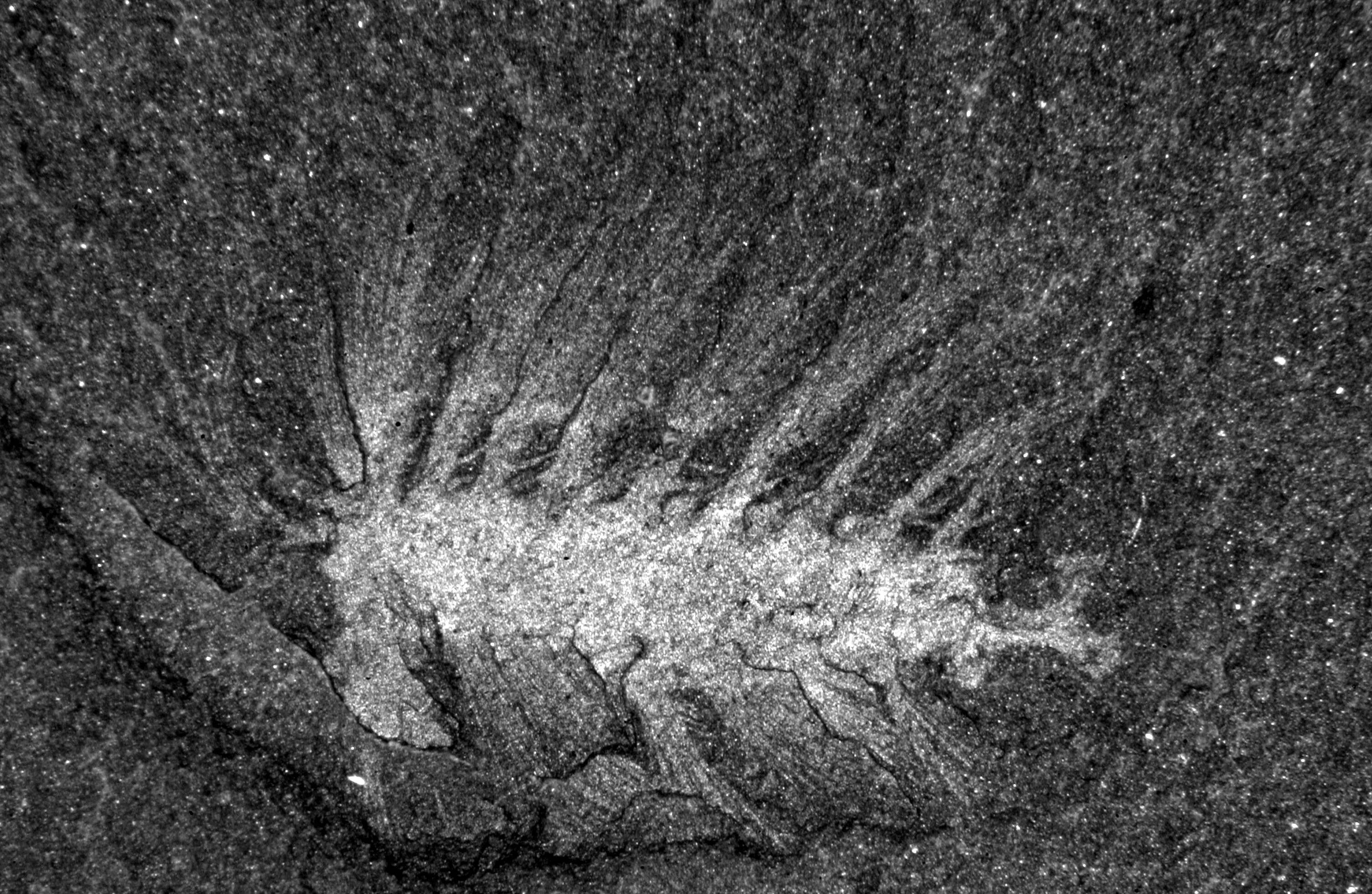
- Holotype specimen

Scientific classification
- Kingdom: Animalia
- Phylum: Annelida
- Class: Polychaeta
- Family: †Insolicoryphidae; Conway Morris, 1979
- Genus: †Insolicorypha; Conway Morris, 1979
- Species: †I. psygma

Binomial name
- †Insolicorypha psygma Conway Morris, 1979

= Insolicorypha =

Insolicorypha Temporal range: Burgess Shale

Genus of annelids (fossil)

Insolicorypha is a genus of polychaetes known from the Middle Cambrian Burgess Shale. A single specimen of Insolicorypha is known from the Greater Phyllopod bed. The genus was described by Conway Morris (1979) and re-examined by Eibye-Jacobsen (2004).
