= Stephenoscolex =

Stephenoscolex Temporal range: Burgess Shale

Scientific classification
- Kingdom: Animalia
- Phylum: Annelida
- Class: Polychaeta
- Family: †Stephenoscolecidae Conway Morris, 1979
- Genus: †Stephenoscolex Conway Morris, 1979
- Species: †S. argutus

Binomial name
- Stephenoscolex argutus Conway Morris, 1979

Genus of annelids (fossil)

Stephenoscolex is a genus of polychaete worm known from the Middle Cambrian Burgess Shale. 150 specimens of Stephenoscolex are known from the Greater Phyllopod bed, where they comprise 0.29% of the community. The genus was described by Conway Morris (1979) and re-examined by Eibye-Jacobsen (2004).
