= Peronochaeta =

Peronochaeta Temporal range: Burgess Shale

Scientific classification
- Kingdom: Animalia
- Phylum: Annelida
- Family: †Peronochaetidae Conway Morris, 1979
- Genus: †Peronochaeta Conway Morris, 1979
- Species: †P. dubia

Binomial name
- Peronochaeta dubia (Walcott, 1911)

Synonyms
- Canadia dubia Walcott, 1911

Extinct genus of annelid worms

Peronochaeta is a genus of annelid known from the Middle Cambrian Burgess Shale. 19 specimens of Peronochaeta are known from the Greater Phyllopod bed, where they comprise < 0.1% of the community. The genus was described by Conway Morris (1979) and re-examined by Eibye-Jacobsen (2004).
