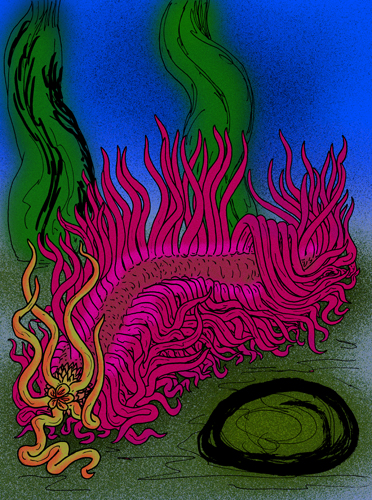
- R. polypodia reconstructed as a holothurian-like animal

Scientific classification
- Genus: †Redoubtia
- Species: †R. polypodia

Binomial name
- †Redoubtia polypodia Walcott 1918

= Redoubtia =

Redoubtia Temporal range: Burgess Shale

Fossil taxon

Redoubtia polypodia is a fossil from the Burgess Shale that was originally described (and later refigured) by Charles Walcott as a holothurian echinoderm. Its affinity is unclear, though; it has also been compared to lobopodians.
