= Siphonostomites =

Siphonostomites Temporal range: Early Eocene
- Type specimen

Scientific classification
- Domain: Eukaryota
- Kingdom: Animalia
- Phylum: Annelida
- Class: Polychaeta
- Order: incertae sedis
- Genus: †Siphonostomites
- Species: †S. hesionoides

Binomial name
- †Siphonostomites hesionoides Roverto, 1904

Extinct genus of annelid worms

Siphonostomites hesionoides is a species of polychaete annelid known only from subtidal lagoon deposits from the Early Eocene of Monte Bolca, Verona, Italy.

It has a fusiform body with chaetae along its length, decreasing in length towards front and rear.

== History of classification ==
Originally described as an alga, 19th century palaeontologists lumped Siphonostomites into wastebasket 'worm' taxa such as Nereites or Eunicites. Roverto (1904) formally established the separate genus, without illustration; a full description was not provided until Alessandrello's 1990 work.

It was considered in the 1962 Treatise to belong to the Flabelligeridae (the current name for Chloraemidae), though this designation is treated with some scepticism by modern experts.
