= Protulophila =

Scientific classification
- Kingdom: Animalia
- Phylum: Cnidaria
- Class: Hydrozoa
- Genus: Protulophila
- Species: Protulophila

Binomial name
- Protulophila Rovereto, 1901

Genus of hydrozoans

Protulophila is a genus of symbiotic or commensal colonial Hydrozoa, known from very small hydroids. These marine hydroids live in the shelly tubes of serpulid tube worms, which are annelids.

The genus Protulophila was named by Rovereto in 1901, from fossil material. For many years scientists knew these animals only from fossils, and the genus was thought to have become extinct about four million years ago. However, in 2014, animals of this genus were discovered within National Institute of Water and Atmospheric Research (NIWA) museum material that had been live-collected in New Zealand in 2008. Protulophila can be regarded as a living fossil.

== History ==
Fossil remains of Protulophila were previously known only from marine deposits in Europe and the Middle East, deposits that date from about 150 million years ago to 4 million years ago, when the genus was thought to have become extinct. In 2014, fossils of the genus that were less than one million-years-old were found in Whanganui, New Zealand by NIWA scientists. The scientist then wondered if perhaps the genus might still be extant in New Zealand. A search of NIWA's invertebrate collection during 2014 revealed specimens of Protulophila in preserved material of serpulid tube worms which had been live-collected in 2008, in 20 m of water in Queen Charlotte Sound, near Picton, New Zealand. The scientists, led by marine biologist Dr. Dennis Gordon, are planning to collect some fresh material so that gene sequencing can be carried out.

== The other life stage ==
Colonial Hydrozoa usually have two very different life stages. All the material that has so far been found of Protulophila is the hydroid or polypoid stage of the organism, a stage in which individual polyps are connected together in a colony. It is likely that there is also a medusoid (small pelagic jellyfish-like) stage, but the medusoid stage in this genus is currently either unknown, or may possibly have been named but has not yet been recognized as being the same organism as the hydroid stage. As Dr. Gordon commented: "Many hydroid species have a two-stage life cycle and often the two stages have never been matched. Our discovery may thus mean that we are solving two puzzles at once.”

== Species ==
Named species within the genus Protulophila include:

- Protulophila gestroi Rovereto, from the Pliocene of Italy
