= Chiropsoides =

Scientific classification
- Kingdom: Animalia
- Phylum: Cnidaria
- Class: Cubozoa
- Order: Chirodropida
- Family: Chiropsalmidae
- Genus: Chiropsoides; Thiel, 1936
- Species: C. buitendijki

Binomial name
- Chiropsoides buitendijki (van der Horst, 1907)

Genus of jellyfishes

Chiropsoides is a genus of box jellyfish in the family Chiropsalmidae. It is monotypic, with a single species, Chiropsoides buitendijki. The most distinct species characteristics are the shape of the gastric saccules, the pedalial canals, and the unilateral pedalial branching.

== Anatomy and morphology ==
As members of the phylum Cnidaria, C. buitendijki have flexible, tubule-shaped stinging cells called nematocysts that coil within a capsule structure and can be launched outward to deliver a sting to prey. Many jellyfish of the class Cubozoa have tubules that can be categorized as microbasic, meaning that the tubule is not longer than the capsule and thus does not need to coil up to fit inside. More specifically, C. buitendijki have tubules called mastigophores, meaning "whip-bearing". Most Cubozoans, including C. buitendijki, have p-mastigophores, meaning that the shaft and tubule differ noticeably in girth. This structure is believed to carry most of the venom within the entire nematocyst.

The umbrella-shaped fleshy body of C. buitendijki has a smooth texture, and the species does not present with any nematocyst warts (freckles). The umbrella can reach about 100 cm (39 in) in diameter in adult specimens, and harbors the typical cuboid shape of other box jellyfish. The species also has six functional eyes.

== Behavior ==
Most studies of C. buitendijki have focused on partial DNA sequencing, anatomical classification, and morphology studies. There is little known about the species’ behavior and community interaction.

Chiropsoides buitendijki has potent venom that can harm human skin. Several cases of human injury have been reported off the southern coast of Malaysia. The sting marks left by the species are very distinctive because of the unique shape of their nematocysts. Species identification is therefore important in treating jellyfish stings.

== Classification ==
The similar species Chiropsoides quadrigatus may be the same species as C. buitendijki; this has been debated since some of the "distinct" features of C. quadrigatus too closely resemble those same "distinct" features found in C. buitendijki. Distinctive features are what identify a species as their own unique taxonomic group. If the features that distinguish each of these species are the same, then it is possible they are in fact one species. More sampling and necropsies are needed to make a clearer distinction.

== Habitat ==
Chiropsoides buitendijki have been recorded in the Indo-Pacific, specifically sighted in India, Malaysia, and Indochina. They live in mangrove forests and other coastal ecosystems. A few sightings of the species have also been reported in the Philippines and Australia. The species closely resembles other species of box jelly, and its habitats have been found to coexist with other Chirodropidae, such as Chironex yamaguchii and Chironex fleckeri; it is quite possible that sightings in Australia and the Philippines have been misidentifications. The range of the species could also be an underestimation due to undersampling and a lack of scientific study of the species.

== Threats ==
Chiropsoides buitendijki have been shown to experience blooms in coastal upwelling regions, especially after monsoon season when the nutrients in the water are well mixed and distributed. However, these blooms in the Indian Ocean bring large numbers of jellyfish to coastal waters, where they are susceptible to bycatch from large fishing vessels. The jellyfish are not typically eaten, so a majority of catch is discarded on board.
