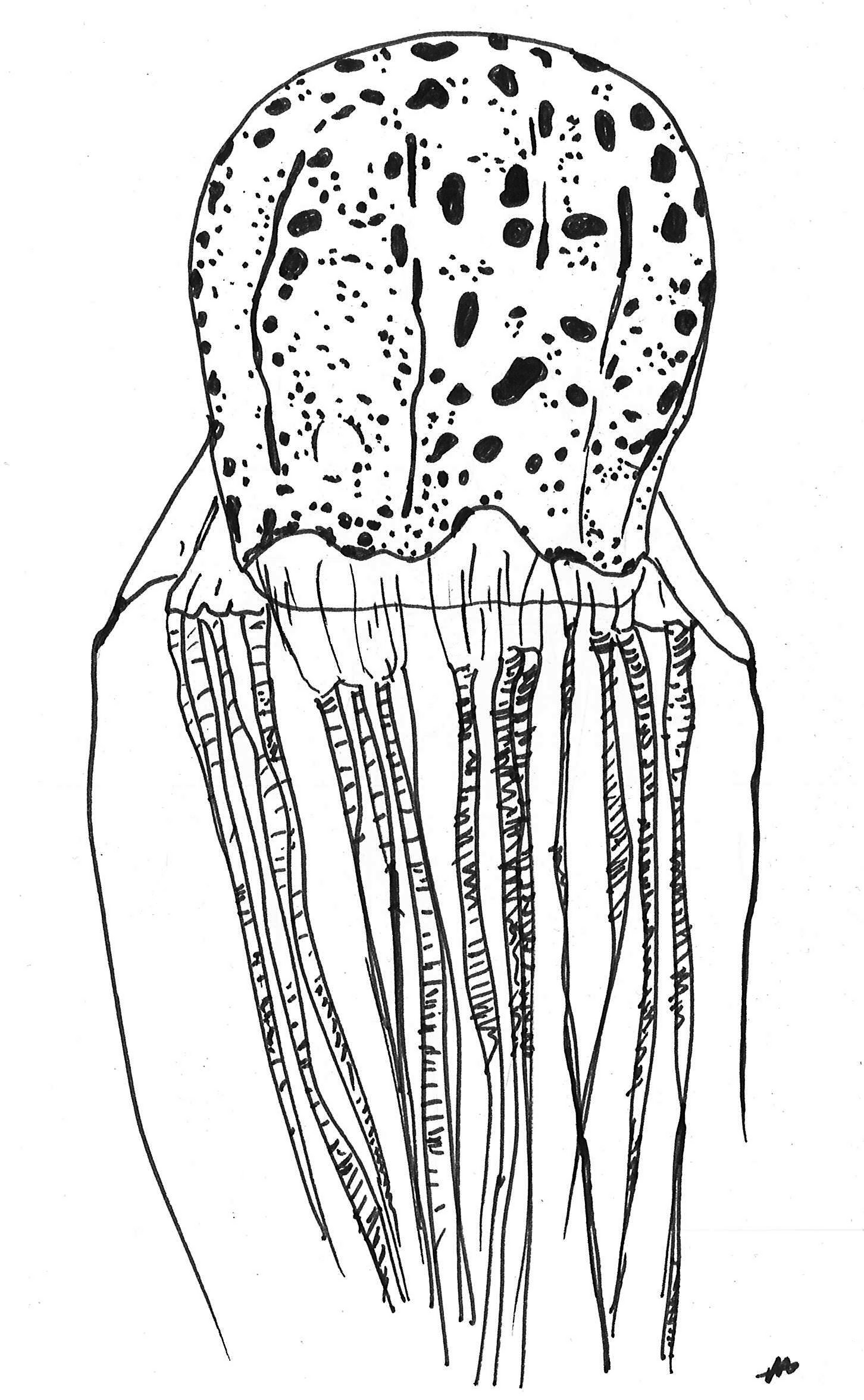
- illustration of Chirodectes maculatus

Scientific classification
- Domain: Eukaryota
- Kingdom: Animalia
- Phylum: Cnidaria
- Class: Cubozoa
- Order: Chirodropida
- Family: Chirodropidae
- Genus: Chirodectes; Gershwin, 2006

Type species
- Chirodectes maculatus (Cornelius, Fenner & Hore, 2005)

= Chirodectes =

Genus of jellyfishes

Chirodectes is a very rare, monospecific genus of box jellyfish in the family Chirodropidae.

The first and only scientifically studied specimen was captured from the outer edge of the Great Barrier Reef – about 43 km (27 mi) off the coast of northeast Queensland – on 2 May 1997. It was found within 5 metres (16 ft) of the surface, and the researchers who first described it speculated that it may have been relocated to the area by Cyclone Justin. Its bell measured approximately 15 cm (5.9 in) in height, and it could only be observed for several hours in an examination lab due to how delicate it was.

There are no recorded cases of a human sting from Chirodectes as it "failed either to sting, or adhere to, the hand and forearm of an incautious volunteer" during the examination, but it is assumed – due to its relatively large size and to the extremely venomous nature of some chirodropids – that Chirodectes is itself venomous. A video of the Chirodectes was recorded underwater before it was collected. Four photos captured from the original 1997 video were published in the scholarly journal Memoirs of the Queensland Museum in 2005.

In December 2021, a jellyfish was filmed by a scuba diver off the coast of Papua New Guinea, which prompted Lisa-ann Gershwin, the marine biologist who first described the genus Chirodectes, to examine the video. A frame-by-frame comparison between the 1997 and 2021 videos convinced Gershwin that the latter likely depicts a new species; however, as of August 2022, it has yet to be formally classified, and a paper has not been submitted for peer review.

== Taxonomy ==
Chirodectes was created in 2006 from C. maculatus, a species originally in the genus Chiropsalmus.

== Species ==
The following species are in this genus:

- Chirodectes maculatus (Cornelius, Fenner & Hore, 2005)
