= Jellyfish dermatitis =

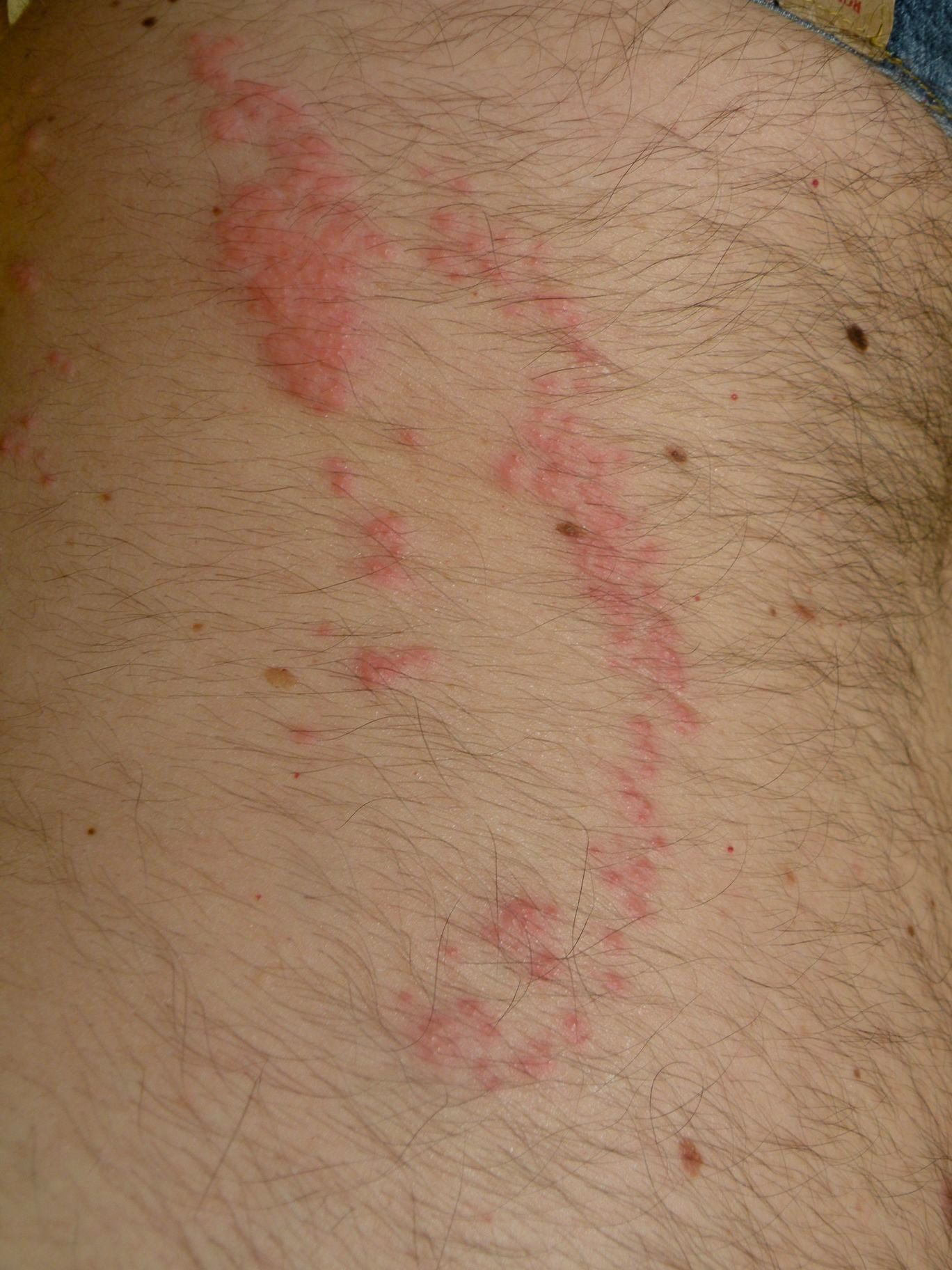
- Jellyfish dermatitis in back abdominal skin. Jellyfish of Mediterranean sea.
- Specialty: Dermatology

Jellyfish dermatitis is a cutaneous condition caused by stings from a jellyfish.

== Remedies and treatment ==
Vinegar has been known to increase the nematocyst discharge in Portuguese man o' war (P. physalis) and the Atlantic sea nettle (C. quinquecirrha).

== Prevention ==
Sun blocks exist which can help prevent or decrease symptoms of stings. Wet suits and foot wear can also be protective. Handling dead or beached jellyfish on the beach is to be avoided.

== Jellyfish species that sting ==
Injuries to humans are the result of about 100 of the 9000–10,000 Cnidarian species.

Below are various species of jellyfish that stings which include:

- Atlantic sea nettle (Chrysaora quinquecirrha)
- Australian box jelly (Chironex fleckeri)
- Black sea nettle (Chrysaora achlyos)
- Carybdea species
- Chironex yamaguchii
- Compass jellyfish (Chrysaora hysoscella)
- Four-handed box jellyfish (Chiropsalmus quadrumanus)
- Irukandji jellyfish (16 species)
- Lion's mane jellyfish (Cyanea capillata)
- Mauve stinger (Pelagia noctiluca)
- Nomad jellyfish (Rhopilema nomadica)
- Nomura's jellyfish (Stomolophus nomurai)
- Pacific sea nettle (Chrysaora fuscescens)
- Portuguese man o' war (Physalia physalis)

== See also ==
- List of cutaneous conditions
- Skin condition
- Stingray injury
- Sea anemone dermatitis
