= Chiropsalmus alipes =

Scientific classification
- Kingdom: Animalia
- Phylum: Cnidaria
- Class: Cubozoa
- Order: Chirodropida
- Family: Chiropsalmidae
- Genus: Chiropsalmus
- Species: C. alipes

Binomial name
- Chiropsalmus alipes Gershwin, 2006

Species of jellyfish

Chiropsalmus alipes is a species of box jellyfish within the order Chirodropida. It is found on the Pacific coast of southern Mexico. This species has very long blade-like pedalia similar to those of Carybdeida, an order of box jellyfish. It also only has four tentacles when it reaches maturity.
