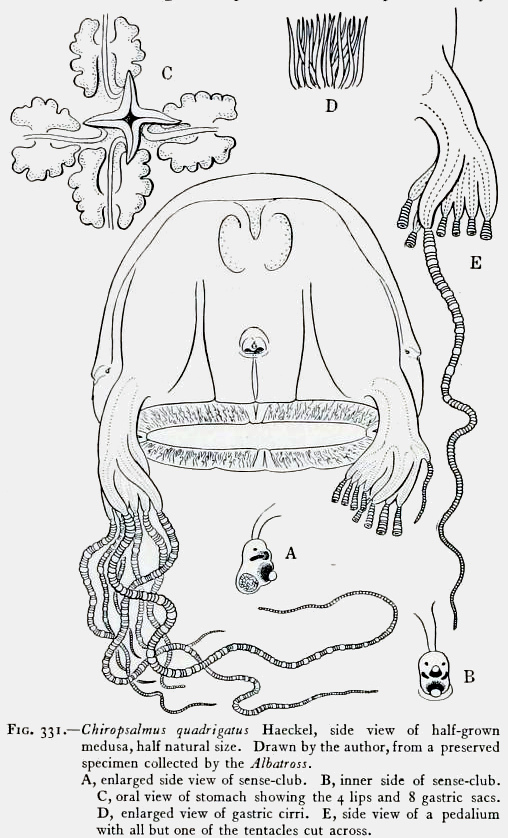
- Chiropsalmus quadrigatus, side view of half-grown medusa. Drawn from a preserved specimen. A, enlarged side view of sense-club. B, inner side of sense-club. C, oral view of stomach showing the 4 lips and 8 gastric sacs. D, enlarged view of gastric cirri. E, side view of a [[Pedalium (cnidaria}|pedalium]] with all but one of the tentacles cut across.
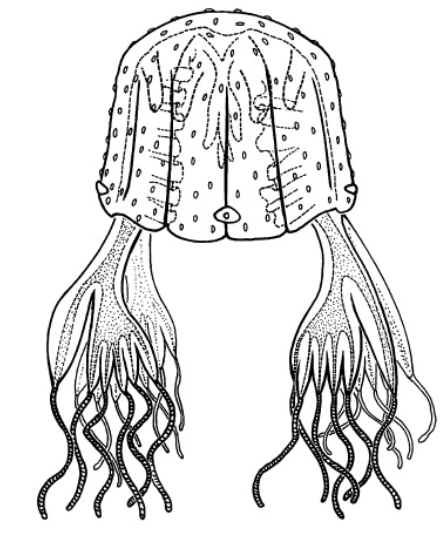
- Chiropsalmus quadrumanus

Scientific classification
- Kingdom: Animalia
- Phylum: Cnidaria
- Class: Cubozoa
- Order: Chirodropida
- Family: Chiropsalmidae
- Genus: Chiropsalmus; Agassiz, 1862

= Chiropsalmus =

Genus of jellyfishes

Chiropsalmus is a genus of box jellyfish in the family Chiropsalmidae.

== Species ==
The following species are recognized in the genus Chiropsalmus:

- Chiropsalmus alipes Gershwin, 2006
- Chiropsalmus quadrumanus (F. Muller, 1859)
