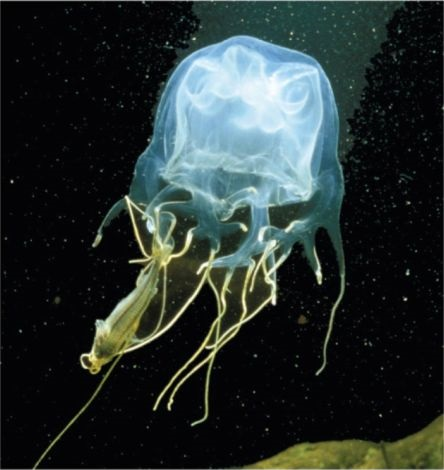
- Chirodropus sp.

Scientific classification
- Domain: Eukaryota
- Kingdom: Animalia
- Phylum: Cnidaria
- Class: Cubozoa
- Order: Chirodropida
- Family: Chirodropidae
- Genus: Chirodropus; Haeckel, 1880

Species
- See text

= Chirodropus =

Genus of jellyfishes

Chirodropus is a genus of box jellyfish in the family Chirodropidae.

== Species ==
The World Register of Marine Species lists the following two species:

- Chirodropus gorilla Haeckel, 1880
- Chirodropus palmatus Haeckel, 1880
