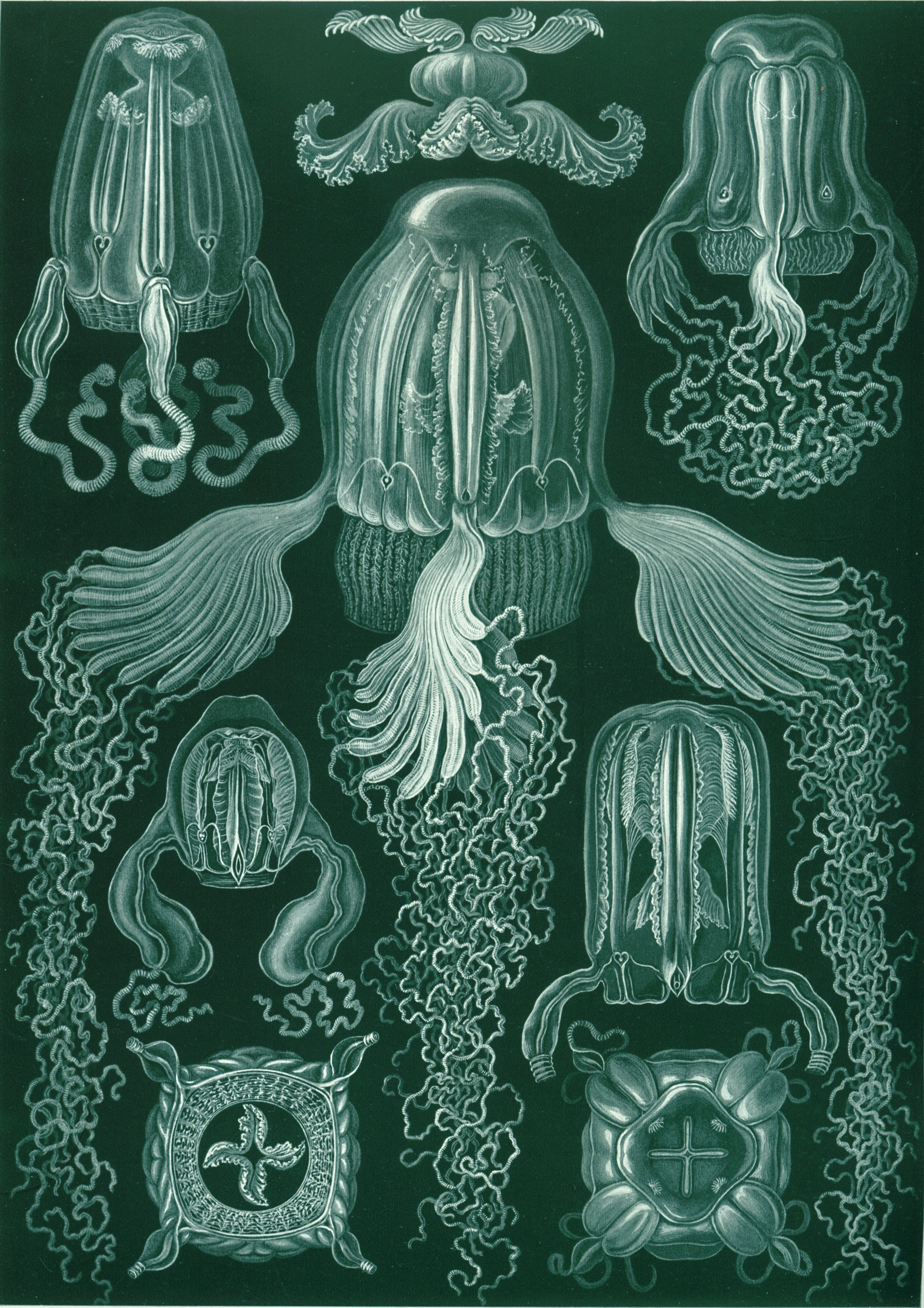
- Chirodropus palmatus is in the center of the image.

Scientific classification
- Kingdom: Animalia
- Phylum: Cnidaria
- Class: Cubozoa
- Order: Chirodropida
- Family: Chirodropidae
- Genus: Chirodropus
- Species: C. palmatus

Binomial name
- Chirodropus palmatus Haeckel, 1880

= Chirodropus palmatus =

Species of jellyfish

Chirodropus palmatus is a species of box jellyfish. It is one of two species belonging to the genus Chirodropus.

== Taxonomy ==
Recent studies showed that Chirodropus palmatus shares several distinctive physical features with the Chiropsalmidae jellyfish: pendant perradial gastric saccules and leaf-like, interradial lateral gonads.
