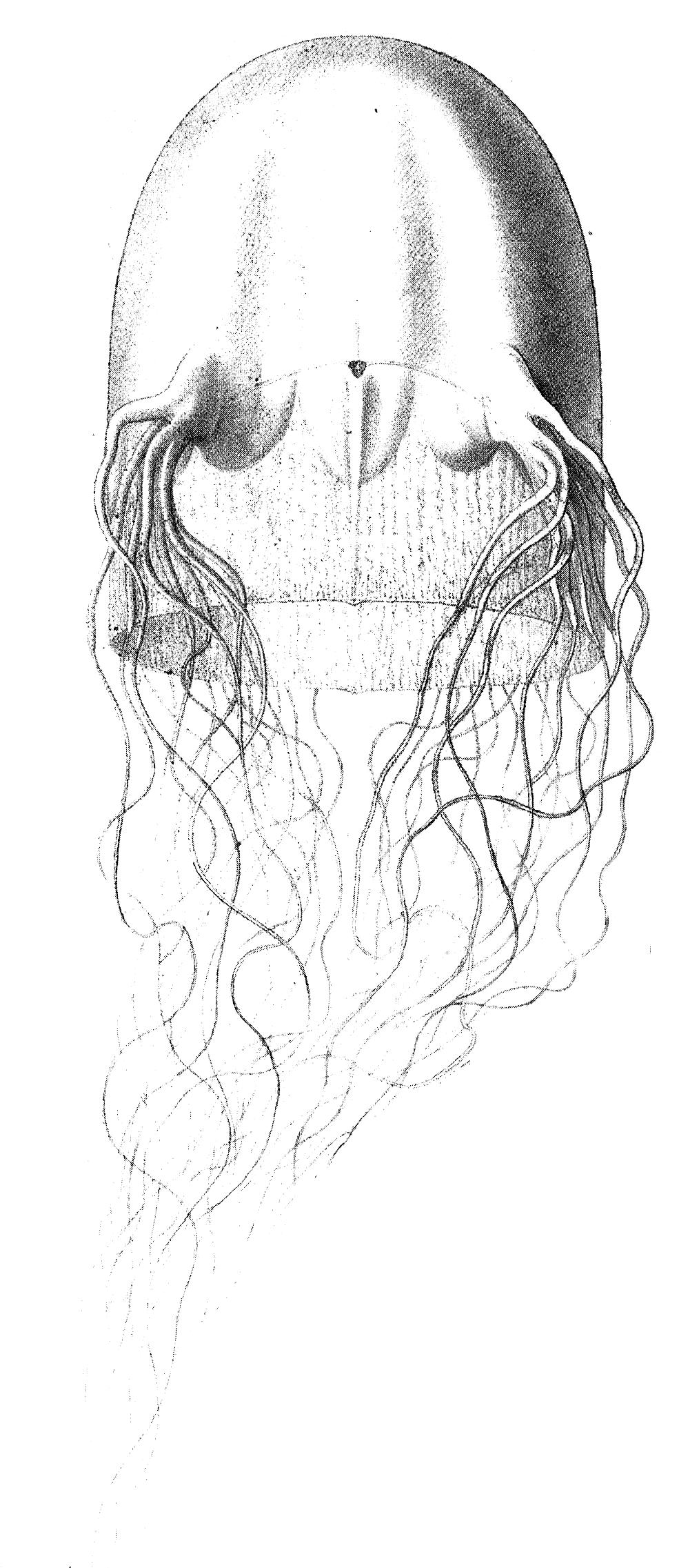

Scientific classification
- Domain: Eukaryota
- Kingdom: Animalia
- Phylum: Cnidaria
- Class: Cubozoa
- Order: Chirodropida
- Family: Chirodropidae
- Genus: Chirodropus
- Species: C. gorilla

Binomial name
- Chirodropus gorilla Haeckel, 1880

= Chirodropus gorilla =

Species of jellyfish

Chirodropus gorilla (commonly known as the gorilla box jelly) is a species of box jellyfish. It is one of two species in the genus Chirodropus. It lives in the deep waters of the western African coast, particularly Namibia. It is characterized by many pale yellow tentacles coming from a central stalk. The umbrella is fairly rigid and transparent with vertical brown stripes.

It is often caught in trawl nets or stranded. Its sting is not known to be fatal, likely due to its rarity.
