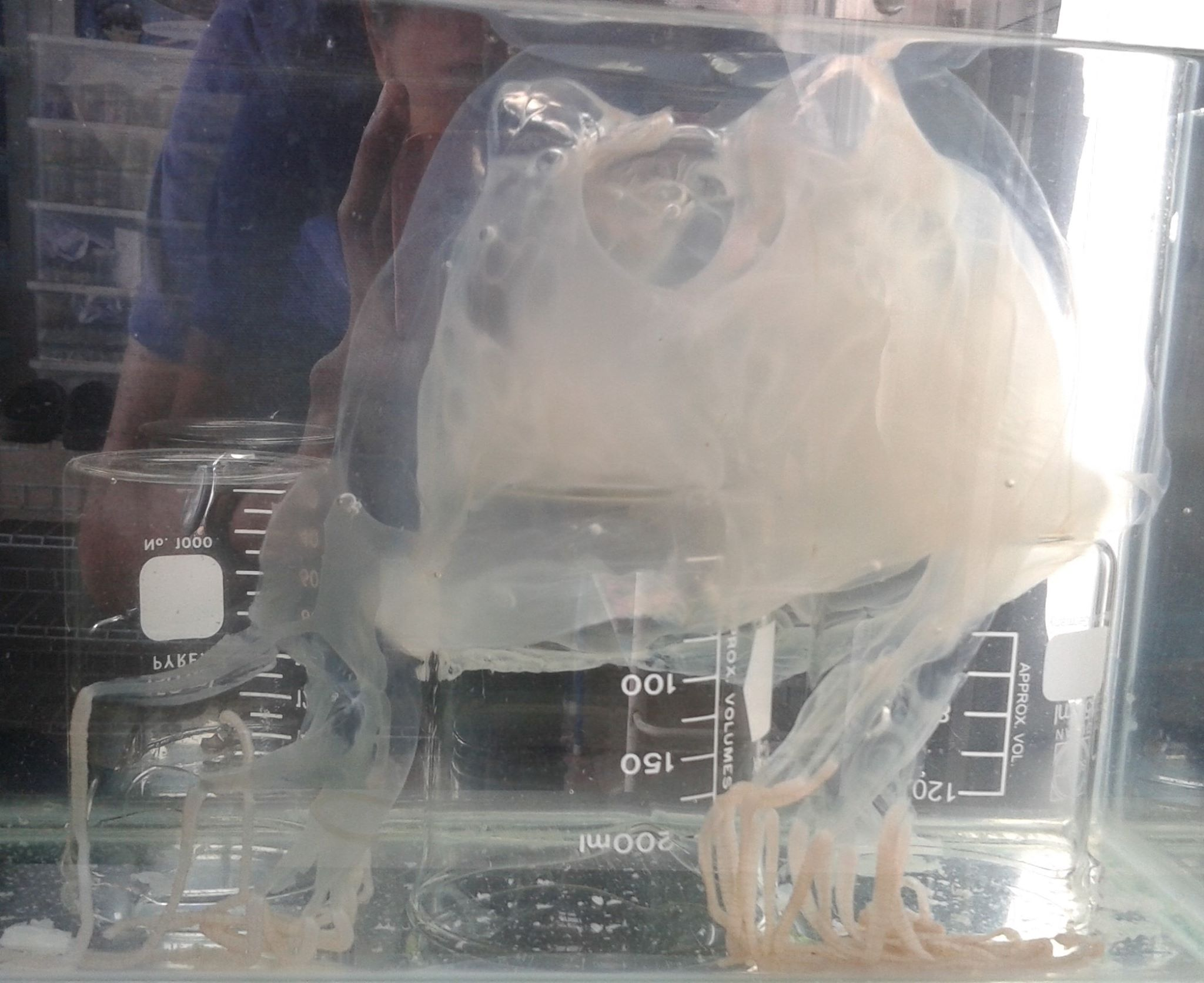
- Chironex indrasaksajiae, Sucharitakul, 2017 locally known as Mangkaprun Klong found in Rayong province, Thailand.

Scientific classification
- Kingdom: Animalia
- Phylum: Cnidaria
- Class: Cubozoa
- Order: Chirodropida
- Family: Chirodropidae
- Genus: Chironex
- Species: C. indrasaksajiae

Binomial name
- Chironex indrasaksajiae Sucharitakul, 2017

= Chironex indrasaksajiae =

Species of jellyfish

Chironex indrasaksajiae, locally known as Mangkaprun Klong, Mangkaprun Sarhai or Sarong, is a species of box jellyfish in a coastal water of the northern and eastern Gulf of Thailand. It has been accused of causing fatalities in the area as it is a member of the genus Chironex.

== Taxonomy ==
All species in the genus were named after a person related to the jellyfish research. The Chironex indrasaksajiae, however, was named after a Thai princess, princess Indrasakdi Sachi (RTGS: Inthrasak Sachi; formerly Queen Indrasakdi Sachi). The species was distinguished from the other species using both morphological and molecular techniques.

== Description ==
A box jellyfish with smooth exumbrella that has a maximum bell height of 150 mm. Most of the morphological characteristics of the species are similar to its congener such as cock’s comb shaped gastric saccules, smooth and triangular shaped perradial lappets with a single frenulum on each side of the bell, and dome shaped rhopalial niche ostia. The jellyfish carries up to 12 tentacles per pedalium on each corner of the bell. The species was distinguished from the other Chironex by the bulbous shaped pedalial canal.

== Distribution ==
Most of the Chironex box jellyfish in Thailand were found only from 9^{o} from the equator and northward. The species was only reported from the upper and eastern Gulf of Thailand.

== Venom ==
The genus Chironex is renowned for delivering highly venomous envenomations that cause fatalities in many countries such as Japan, Philippines and Australia. All of the fatal cases in the Gulf of Thailand occurred in the area where the Chironex box jellyfish are found.
