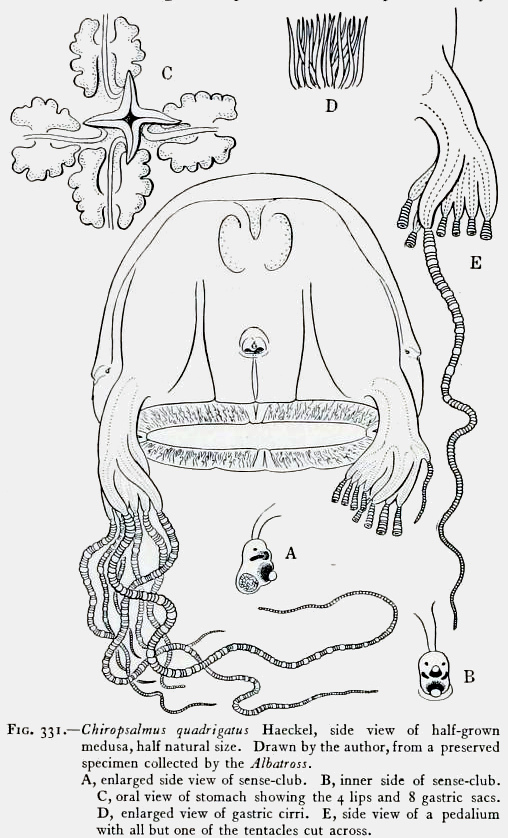
- Chiropsalmus quadrigatus, side view of half-grown medusa. Drawn from a preserved specimen. A, enlarged side view of sense-club. B, inner side of sense-club. C, oral view of stomach showing the 4 lips and 8 gastric sacs. D, enlarged view of gastric cirri. E, side view of a pedalium with all but one of the tentacles cut across.
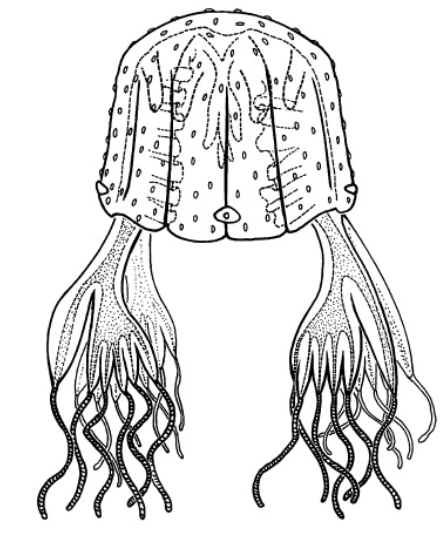
- Chiropsalmus quadrumanus

Scientific classification
- Kingdom: Animalia
- Phylum: Cnidaria
- Class: Cubozoa
- Order: Chirodropida
- Family: Chiropsalmidae; Thiel, 1936

Genera
- See text

= Chiropsalmidae =

Family of jellyfishes

Chiropsalmidae is a family of venomous box jellyfish within the class Cubozoa.

== Genera ==
- Chiropsalmus Agassiz, 1862

- Chiropsalmus alipes Gershwin, 2006
- Chiropsalmus quadrumanus (F. Muller, 1859)

- Chiropsoides Southcott, 1956

- Chiropsoides buitendijki (van der Horst, 1907)
