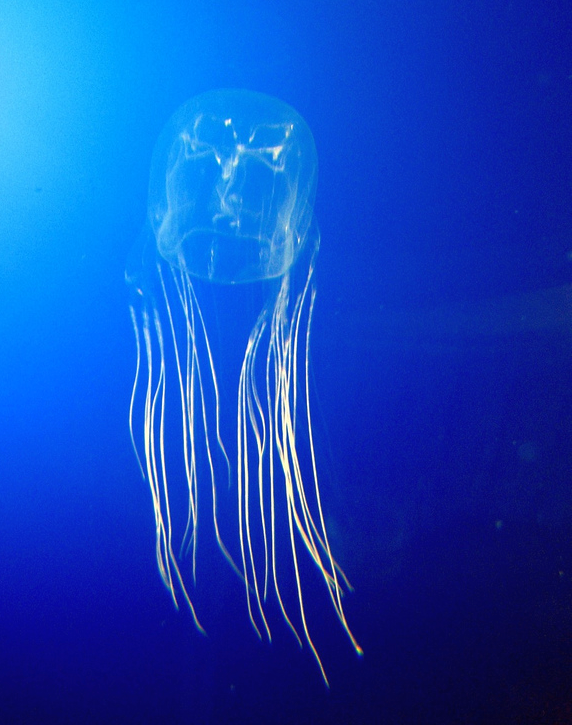
- Chironex sp.

Scientific classification
- Kingdom: Animalia
- Phylum: Cnidaria
- Class: Cubozoa
- Order: Chirodropida
- Family: Chirodropidae
- Genus: Chironex; Southcott, 1956

= Chironex =

Genus of jellyfishes

Chironex (lit. 'hand of violent death') is a genus of box jellyfish in the family Chirodropidae. Their stings are highly venomous, and have caused human fatalities. Based on present knowledge, the genus is restricted to the central Indo-Pacific, ranging from southern Japan to northern Australia.

== Species ==
The World Register of Marine Species lists the following species:

- Chironex blakangmati Iesa et al., 2026
- Chironex fleckeri Southcott, 1956
- Chironex indrasaksajiae Sucharitakul, 2017
- Chironex yamaguchii Lewis & Bentlage, 2009
