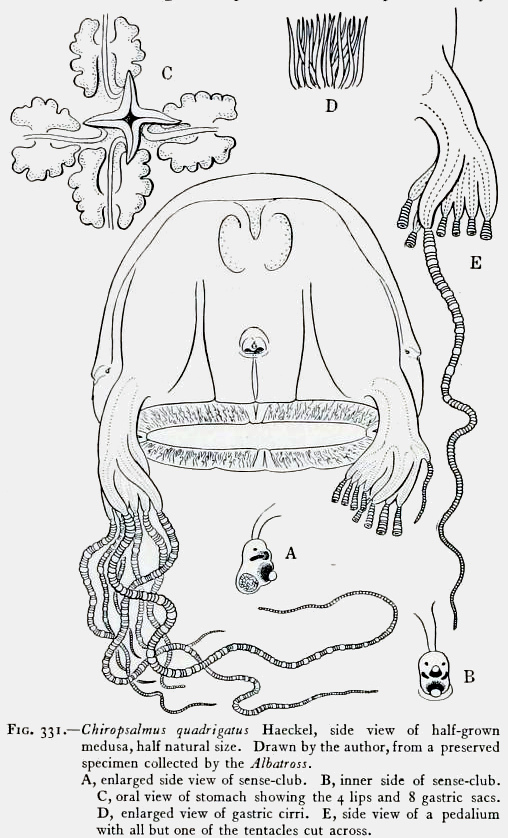
- Chiropsalmus quadrigatus, side view of half-grown medusa. Drawn from a preserved specimen. A, enlarged side view of sense-club. B, inner side of sense-club. C, oral view of stomach showing the 4 lips and 8 gastric sacs. D, enlarged view of gastric cirri. E, side view of a pedalium with all but one of the tentacles cut across.
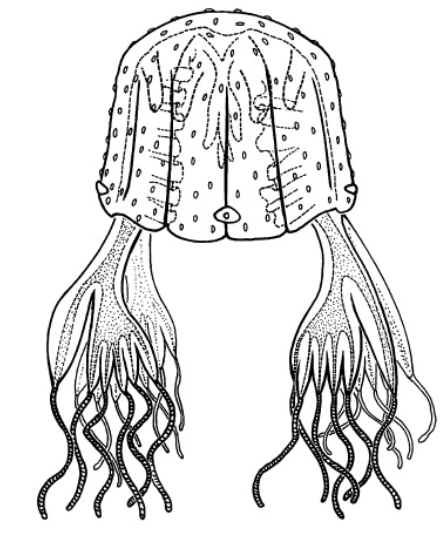

Scientific classification
- Kingdom: Animalia
- Phylum: Cnidaria
- Class: Cubozoa
- Order: Chirodropida
- Family: Chiropsalmidae
- Genus: Chiropsalmus
- Species: C. quadrumanus

Binomial name
- Chiropsalmus quadrumanus (F. Müller, 1859)

Synonyms
- Tamoya quadrumanaF. Müller, 1859

= Chiropsalmus quadrumanus =

Species of jellyfish

Chiropsalmus quadrumanus, commonly known as the four-handed box jellyfish, is a species of box jellyfish found in the western Atlantic Ocean, the Gulf of Mexico and the Pacific Ocean. The sting is venomous and dangerous to humans, especially children.

== Taxonomy ==
Little and/or poor taxonomic research has been conducted on Chiropsalmus quadrumanus. In 2006, Lisa-ann Gershwin noted that the South American neotype's cnidome was differing from the United States species. Several studies on the species have been conducted since then. One in 1975 gives statistics and charts that clearly shows the differing cnidomes of U.S. species compared to that of the neotype of Gershwin's. No new taxa have been erected to accommodate the research.

== Description ==
Chiropsalmus quadrumanus is a cube-shaped, colourless, transparent jellyfish with a diameter of about 14 centimetres (5.5 in) and height a little less than this. The body is composed of a gelatinous material and the top edges are rounded while the top surface is flat. Bundles of 7 to 9 tentacles dangle from pedalia, palmate appendages at the four lower corners of the bell, with a tentacle on each "finger". The outer two tentacles are pinkish and the inner ones yellowish white and they can be up to 3 to 4 metres (9.8 to 13.1 ft) long. Halfway up the inside of the bell is the velarium, a horizontal ring of tissue partially blocking the aperture. The manubrium is a central column hanging down inside the bell with the mouth at its tip. The rounded stomach has four pouches connecting to radial sinuses along the edges of the bell. The gonads are on either side of the radial canals.

== Distribution and habitat ==
Chiropsalmus quadrumanus is found on the east coast of North America in North and South Carolina, Georgia, Florida, Alabama, Mississippi, Louisiana, Texas, the Caribbean, the Gulf of Mexico and Mexico, and a disjunct population in Brazil. It also occurs in the Pacific Ocean and has been reported from Hawaii and Australia. It is usually found in the warm, open seas but it is sometimes found inshore in large numbers in places where it has not been found. When this happened on the Texas Gulf coast in 1955 and 1956, it coincided with drought conditions and an associated high salinity level in the area. The jellyfish were seldom seen near the surface but small specimens were frequently taken in shrimp trawls. After gales large quantities were washed up on the beach, and after heavy rains, many dead jellyfish were found floating on the surface. When conditions returned to normal, the jellyfish disappeared.

== Toxicity ==
The long tentacles of Chiropsalmus quadrumanus are armed with nematocysts, the purpose of which is to capture prey such as small fish and to deter predators. They can inflict an extremely painful sting on people that encounter them. There is a documented case of a four-year-old boy in the Gulf of Mexico dying within forty minutes of being stung. Of forty-nine people stung by jellyfish off the coast of Brazil over a five-year period, twenty were by identifiable species. Sixteen of these were identified as being caused by Chiropsalmus quadrumanus and four by the Portuguese man o' war (Physalia physalis). All these stings were linear in nature, causing both intense pain and systemic symptoms. Apart from pain, the symptoms include cardiac dysfunction and respiratory depression. The rash lasts for several months. Antivenom administered within a few hours relieves the pain somewhat, reduces the severity of the rash, and improves other symptoms. In extreme cases, cardiopulmonary resuscitation can be effective if started promptly.
