= Hydroid dermatitis =

- Specialty: Dermatology

Hydroid dermatitis is a cutaneous condition that occurs after contact with the small marine hydroid Halecium.

== See also ==
- Sea anemone dermatitis
- List of cutaneous conditions
