= Sea anemone dermatitis =

- Specialty: Dermatology
- Symptoms: Itch, Swelling
- Causes: Sea Anemone contact

Sea anemone dermatitis is a skin condition resulting from contact with certain sea anemones, similar to the conditions jellyfish- and hydroid dermatitis.

== Transmission ==
This condition is spread by sea anemones, a group which have nematocysts, a body part which have a sharp component and is able to sting, and pass on a toxin. How deep the nematocyst is injected into a recipient can vary based on species of the anemone. As well as transmission from adult anemone, skin irritation can be caused by planula larvae or an earlier life stage of the anemones, which are quite small and float through the water, and therefore able to irritate more of the skin, such as under bathing suits.

Those who may be at risk include swimmers, water skiers, jet skier,s operators of small boats, clammers, and others who may be in shallow water in affected areas. Sea anemone dermatitis has been noted in people of a range of ages.

The species Haloclava producta has been associated with cases of sea anemone dermatitis in clammers off the coast of Long Island, New York.

Transmission can be prevented among clammers by covering the legs in order to prevent direct contact with sand or water.

== Symptoms ==
Symptoms usually occur no less than 12 hours after transmission.

Sea anemone dermatitis can result in a pruritic, or itchy, reaction, and a stinging feeling. Symptoms range in severity, and can also include swelling or necrosis.

The most severe cases may include kidney failure, but most often the condition is only mildly harmful and does not progress. Generally, cases resolve in a week or less. People with other conditions such as asthma or allergies may have more severe symptoms on average.

== See also ==
- Skin lesion
- List of cutaneous conditions
