= Southcott Limited =

Southcott Limited was an automotive engineering business in Adelaide, South Australia.

James Henry Southcott (1857–1913) established an engineering workshop at his home, 196 Gilles Street, Adelaide in 1887, initially repairing and fabricating machinery for the leather and printing trades, but increasingly motor vehicles. He had a genius for invention and was the author of several patents: an early project was the design and manufacture of a postage stamp perforating machine.

By investing in highly capable machinery and workmen he was able to make replacement parts for automobiles at a time when cars were the province of the wealthy and spares could take months to arrive if at all. The business prospered and he was able to send his sons to St Peter's College.

Three of his sons — Horace Southcott (1891–1949), Lloyd Southcott (1892–1947) and Wilfred Southcott (1899–1947) — carried on the business as J. H. Southcott, then from 1919 as Southcott Limited. E. Gordon Wright was manager of the motor repair workshop.

Alan Lloyd Southcott (1916–1997) succeeded his father, Horace Southcott, as chairman and managing director of the company. He was also chairman of directors of Motor Traders Ltd (SA) and William Hudd & Co. Ltd, wholesale automotive parts distributors.

The eldest son of James Henry Southcott (1857–1913), James Henry Southcott (1888–1958), established his own company in 1929, confusingly named J. H. Southcott Engineering at 229–233 Pirie Street. The company was still operating at that address in 1966.

== Family ==
James Henry Southcott (1857 – 14 December 1913) married Selina Beaglehole (1862 – 24 November 1940) on 27 May 1886. Their children were:

- James Henry Southcott (1888–1958)

- Delna Yvette Southcott married Ronald Frank Bradford on 10 January 1947
- Gwendoline Constance Southcott married Boyd Ardill Gluyas on 31 January 1942
- other daughters were Gwen Southcott; Vessey Southcott;

- Horace Lloyd Southcott (1891 – 9 October 1949) married Mary Robertson Carter of Rosebrook Station, Horsham, Victoria, on 22 September 1915. He made the newspapers after appearing as witness for the defence of an ex-employee.

- Alan Lloyd Southcott (1916–1997) married W(inifred) Vance Ferris in 1939. He was an RAAF serviceman, POW in WWII.
- Ronald Vernon Southcott (1918–1998) was known for work on Acari mites and ticks.
- also Valerie, Yvonne and Rosemary

- Mildred Southcott (1894 – 25 May 1948) married William F. J. McCann, war hero and public servant
- Effie Southcott (1896 – 1954) married Hamilton Hector Cyril Gray in 1921
- Wilfred Beaglehole Southcott (1899 – 6 April 1947) married Eva Victoria Ann Jacka (died 25 August 1945) in 1925
- Clifford Michell Southcott (1903 – 17 September 1948)
