= Hugo Flecker =

Australian medical practitioner, radiotherapist, toxicologist and natural historian

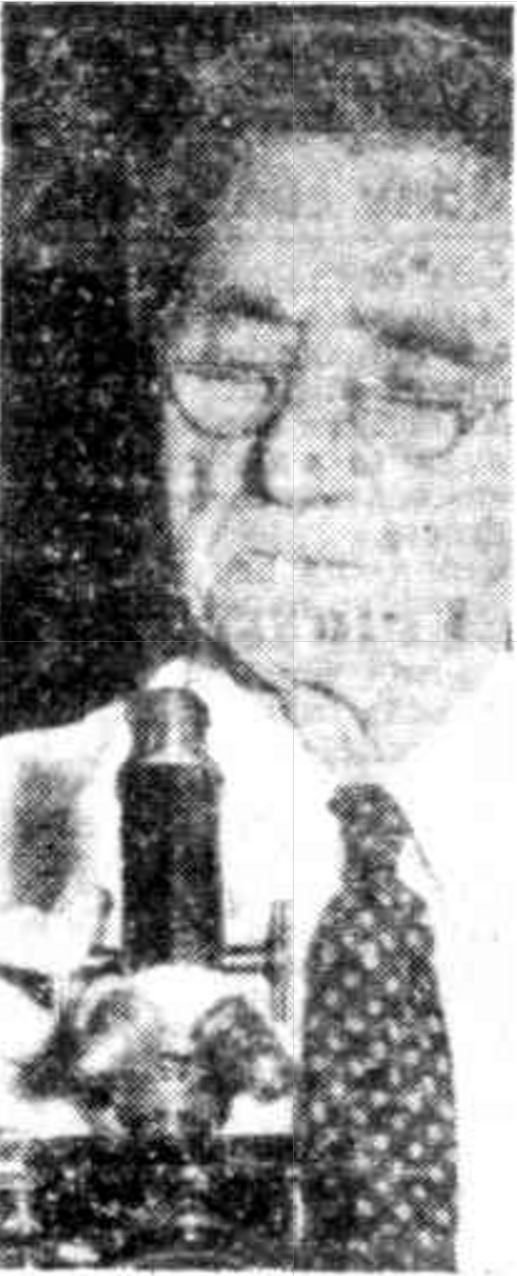
Hugo Flecker, at the microscope in his laboratory, 1953

Hugo Flecker (7 December 1884 – 25 June 1957) was an Australian medical practitioner, radiotherapist, toxicologist and natural historian. He founded the North Queensland Naturalist Club in 1932, whose herbarium grew into the now heritage-listed Flecker Botanical Gardens in Cairns, Queensland. He identified the deadly box jellyfish, Chironex fleckeri.

== Early life ==
Hugo Flecker was born in Melbourne, Victoria in 1884.

== North Queensland Naturalist Club ==
From the early 1930s there were community calls for the establishment of a formal botanical garden within the recreation reserve in Cairns. Momentum came largely from Dr Hugo Flecker and the North Queensland Naturalist Club, which he founded in 1932. Flecker was a radiologist with a strong interest in natural history, especially toxic plants and animals. He undertook valuable work on the Queensland Finger Cherry and the Tar Tree and identified the deadly box jelly, Chironex fleckeri. From 1935 he contributed a weekly column to the Cairns Post on behalf of the Naturalist Club, in which he publicly advocated the establishment of a botanic garden at the recreation reserve.

== Botanic Gardens ==
In 1933, with encouragement from the Queensland Government Botanist, Cyril White, Flecker established the North Queensland Naturalists' Club Herbarium in the grounds of the Cairns City Council's nursery in the recreation reserve. The club's collection grew from around 1,600 specimens in 1937 to about 5,000 in 1950 and an estimated final collection size of around 10,680 specimens. The collection proved popular with visitors, enhancing their experiences of the gardens. Until 1949 specimens were housed at the gardens in a storeroom supplied and erected by the Cairns City Council, then the collection was moved to the former Kuranda Barracks on the Cairns Esplanade. It returned briefly to the Cairns Botanic Gardens from 1967 to 1971, but is now fully incorporated in the general collection at the CSIRO Division of Forest Research at Atherton.

In 1934–35 a significant advance was made with around 25 acres (10 hectares) of the reserve on the lower slopes of Mt Islay cleared of heavy undergrowth and planted with young trees. The mayor of Cairns advised that the reserve would be planted with "permanent trees which are noteworthy for their ornamentation and their regularity of design, planted at pre-determined distances, so that they will provide permanent avenues of great beauty." Trees and shrubs of a less "permanent" nature were to be removed and relocated to other parts of the reserve allowing for the development of avenues lined with pine, acacia, palms, Poinciana and others. This project continued until 1940 when part of the recreation reserve (suburban section 74, north of the council nursery) was converted to a Quarry Reserve for war purposes and part of the 1930s gardens work was destroyed by quarrying. It appears that oil palms, poincianas, hoop pines, two rubber trees, a Dillenia, a Schizolobium, an Indian mango, a Wongi plum, a Terminalia and a Malay Apple were planted during this period by Les Wright.

In 1971 the Cairns City Council named its new garden the Flecker Botanic Gardens to commemorate Dr Flecker's contribution to botany. (The name has since been applied to the whole of the recreation reserve). At this time there was a collection of over 100 different species of native orchids growing on a line of palms, and over 100 species of palms including oil palms and royal palms in the area facing Collins Avenue. North of this area and facing McCormack Street was a densely wooded area containing earlier plantings. After 1966 this area was cleared of lantana and undergrowth and pathways established. Among the plantings at this time were coffee, tea, cocoa, turmeric, ginger, curry leaf and other medicinal plants including Taraktogenos from Burma. The largest tree in this area at this time was the Samanea saman or Rain Tree from South America, and well advanced were two Hevea brasiliensis, a source of rubber, ready for tapping. A "fine specimen" of breadfruit was growing in front of the curator's office in 1973. In 1974 the Flecker Botanic Gardens was listed in the International Directory of Botanical Gardens, following an invitation received from the Association of Botanical Gardens (now The Botanic Gardens Conservation International) in Edinburgh. At this period the gardens held an amazing variety and quantity of ferns, some of which were exceptionally rare. Flecker Botanic Gardens remains a member of this Association.

In 1982 new entrance gates were erected at the 1971 Flecker Botanic Gardens to commemorate the 50th anniversary of the founding of the North Queensland Naturalists' Club.

Flecker Botanic Gardens continues its important botanic role, extending its collection of endangered species from the Wet Tropics World Heritage Area and providing assistance to both national and international scientific work. The garden maintains national and international memberships such as the Royal Australian Institute of Parks and Recreation, and Botanic Gardens Conservation International, and is noted nationally and internationally for its collections of palms, gingers and aroids.

== Box jellyfish Chironex fleckeri ==
On 20 January 1955, a 5-year-old boy died after being stung in shallow water at Cardwell. Flecker found three types of jellyfish there, one of which was unidentified. It was a box-shaped jellyfish with groups of tentacles arising from each corner. Flecker sent it to Dr Ronald Southcott in Adelaide. On 29 December 1955 Southcott published a paper introducing it as a new genus and species of lethal box jellyfish.

Ronald Southcott named the box jellyfish Chironex fleckeri, the name being derived from the Greek cheiro ("hand"), and the Latin nex ("murderer"), and fleckeri in honour of its discoverer.

Through the ACT Governments "Place Names" department of the Environment, Planning and Sustainable Development Directorate - a road in the suburb of Florey ACT was named in honour of Hugo Flecker and his contributions to science (Flecker Place).
