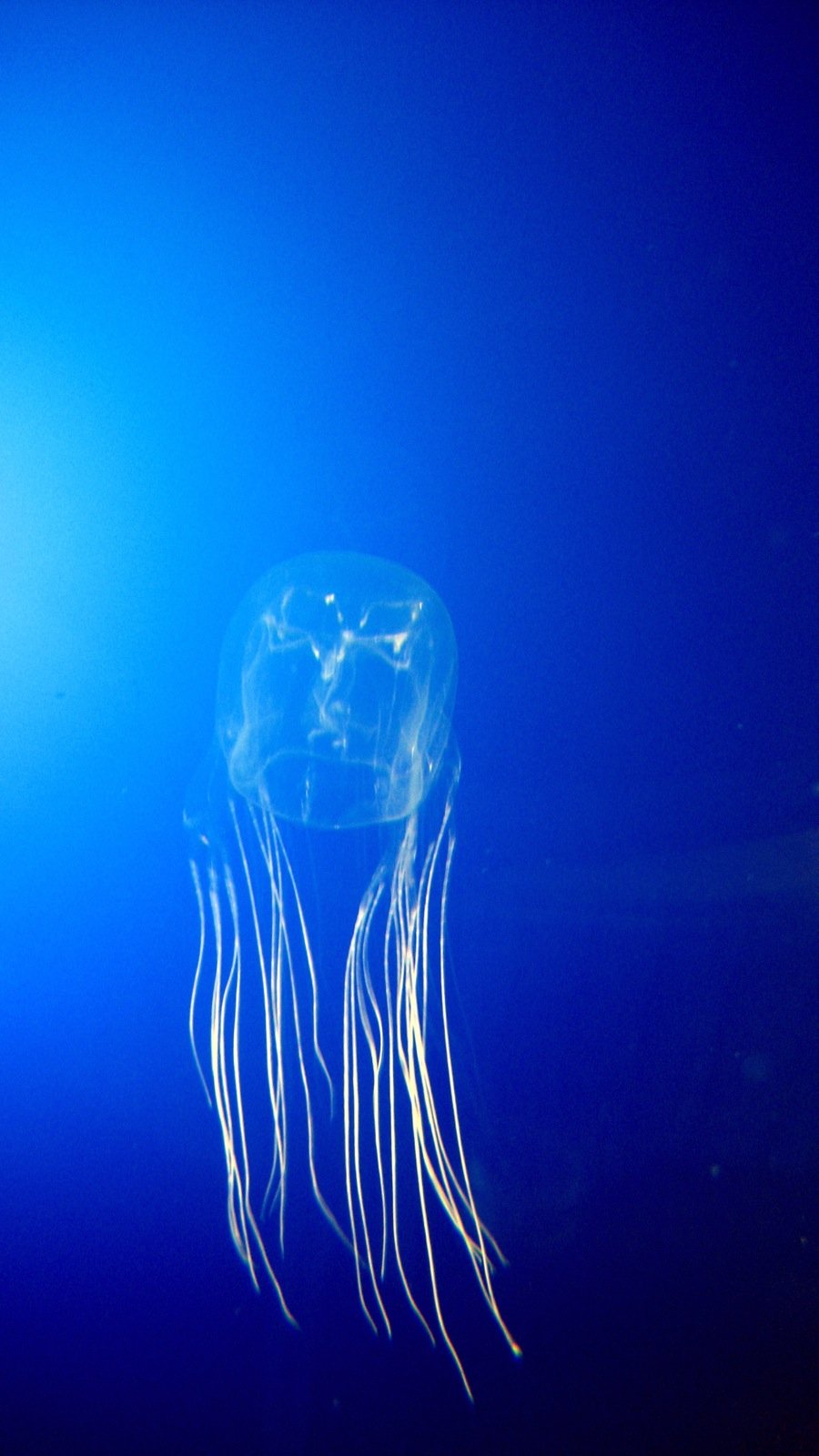
- Chironex sp.

Scientific classification
- Kingdom: Animalia
- Phylum: Cnidaria
- Class: Cubozoa
- Order: Chirodropida
- Family: Chirodropidae; Haeckel, 1880

Genera
- Chirodectes Gershwin, 2006; Chirodropus Haeckel, 1880; Chironex Southcott, 1956

= Chirodropidae =

Family of jellyfishes

Chirodropidae is a family of venomous box jellyfish within the class Cubozoa. Like other members of the order Chirodropida, they have branched pedalia (muscular bases at the corners of their cubic umbrella), in contrast to the unbranched pedalia of box jellyfish in the order Carybdeida. Each branch houses its own individual tentacle. Nematocyst composition and type can vary among individuals within this family based on body size and life stage. Like other box jellyfish, chirodropids can be found in coastal and shallow marine areas, but they have also been found to occur at benthic depths.

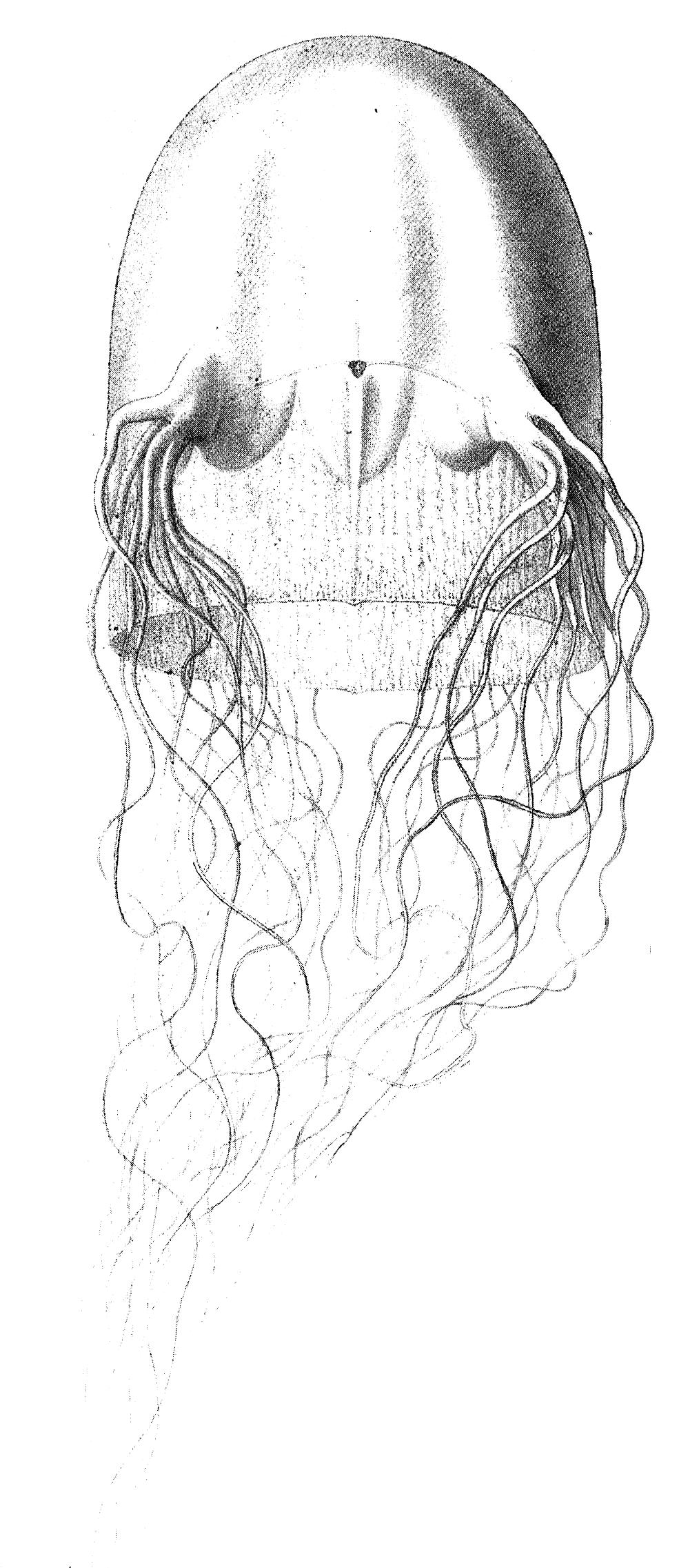
Chirodropus gorilla

== Habitat and Distribution ==
Chirodropida have been reported from a range of tropical, sub-tropical, and mild temperatures localities in the Pacific and Atlantic Ocean commonly found in Japan and Australia close to the coasts which affect the local fishermen, divers, and bathers. The Chirodropida jellyfish family have being seen on the deep coastal reefs.This type of jellyfish are strong swimmers which is a big advantage in highly dynamic tidal environments and help them to move from one place to another.

== Genera ==
- Chirodectes Gershwin, 2006

- Chirodectes maculatus (Cornelius, Fenner & Hore, 2005)

- Chirodropus Haeckel, 1880

- Chirodropus gorilla Haeckel, 1880
- Chirodropus palmatus Haeckel, 1880

- Chironex Southcott, 1956

- Chironex blakangmati Iesa et al., 2026
- Chironex fleckeri Southcott, 1956
- Chironex indrasaksajiae Sucharitakul, 2017
- Chironex yamaguchii Lewis & Bentlage, 2009
