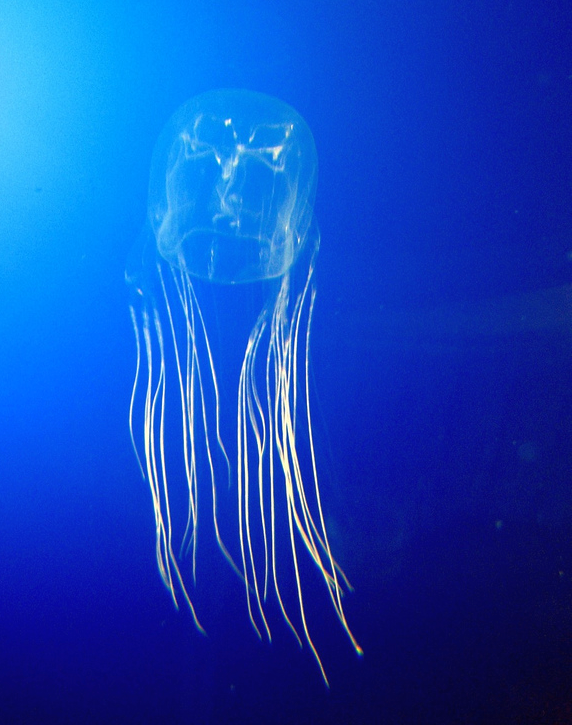
- Chironex sp.

Scientific classification
- Kingdom: Animalia
- Phylum: Cnidaria
- Class: Cubozoa
- Order: Chirodropida
- Family: Chirodropidae
- Genus: Chironex
- Species: C. fleckeri

Binomial name
- Chironex fleckeri Southcott, 1956
- Range of Chironex fleckeri as traditionally defined, but see text.

= Chironex fleckeri =

Species of jellyfish

Chironex fleckeri, commonly known as the Australian box jelly and nicknamed the sea wasp, is a species of extremely venomous box jellyfish found in coastal waters from northern Australia and Papua New Guinea to Indonesia, East Timor, Cambodia, Malaysia, Singapore, the Philippines and Vietnam. It has been described as "the most lethal jellyfish in the world", with at least 64 known deaths in Australia from 1884 to 2021.

Notorious for its sting, C. fleckeri has tentacles up to 3 m (10 ft) long covered with millions of cnidocytes which, on contact, release microscopic darts delivering an extremely powerful venom. Being stung commonly results in excruciating pain, and if the sting area is significant, an untreated victim may die in two to five minutes. The amount of venom in one animal is said to be enough to kill 60 adult humans.

== Taxonomy ==
Chironex fleckeri was named after North Queensland toxicologist and radiologist Doctor Hugo Flecker. On 20 January 1955, when a 5-year-old boy died after being stung in shallow water at Cardwell, North Queensland, Flecker found three types of jellyfish. One was an unidentified box-shaped jellyfish with groups of tentacles arising from each corner. Flecker sent it to Dr. Ronald Southcott in Adelaide, and on 29 December 1955, Southcott published his article introducing it as a new genus and species of lethal box jellyfish. He named it Chironex fleckeri: the genus name a compound of the centaur Chiron in Greek mythology (whose name is probably related to Ancient Greek χείρ meaning "hand") and Latin nex meaning "murder", and the specific epithet "fleckeri" in honour of its discoverer. The name "hand of death" refers to the four appendages of C. fleckeri appearing as hands.

== Description ==
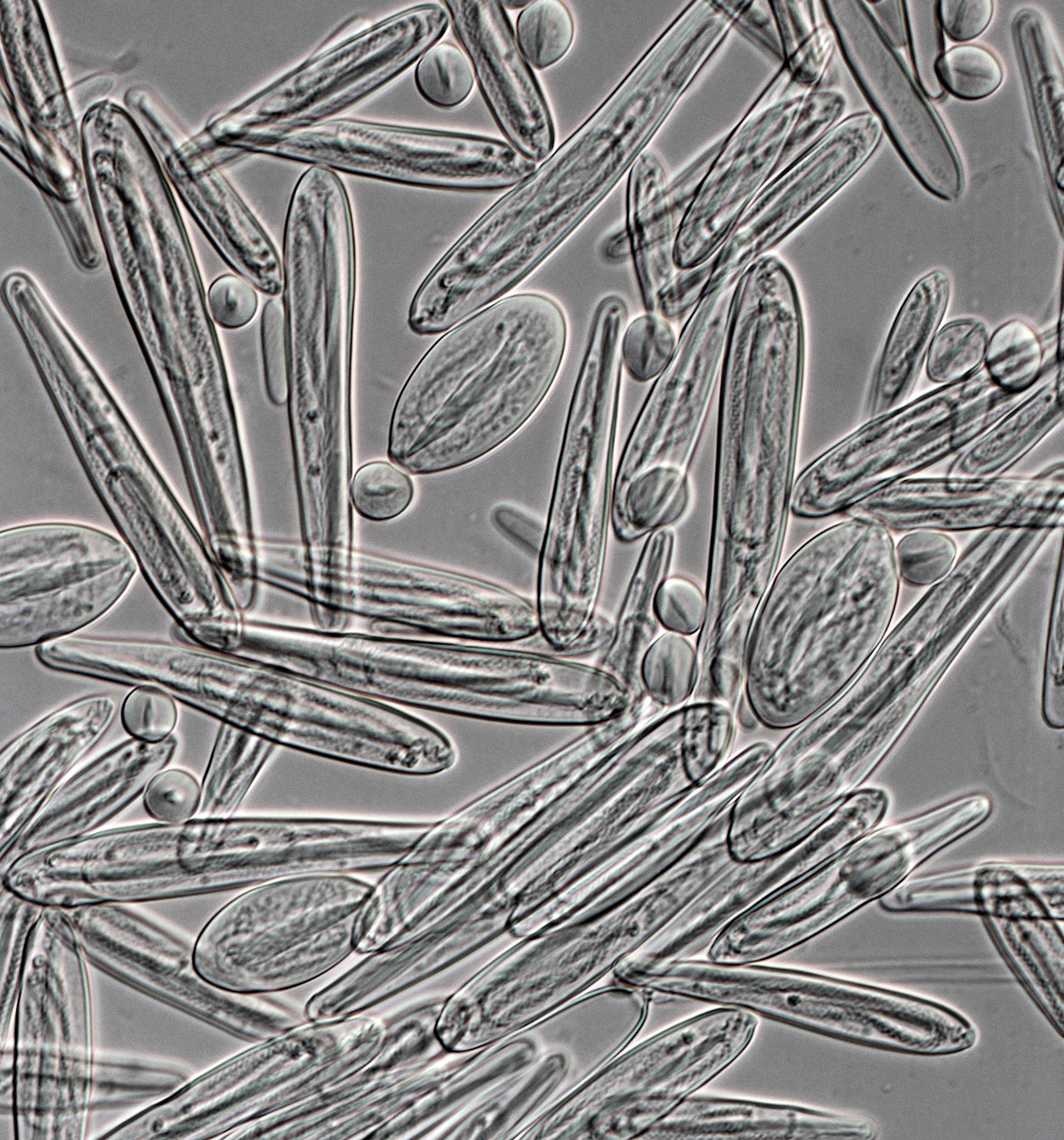
Cnidocytes from Chironex fleckeri (400x magnification)

Chironex fleckeri is the largest of the cubozoans (collectively called box jellyfish), many of which may carry similarly toxic venom. Its bell usually reaches about 16 cm (6.3 in) in diameter but can grow up to 35 cm (14 in). From each of the four corners of the bell trails a cluster of 15 tentacles. The pale blue bell has faint markings; viewed from certain angles, it bears a somewhat eerie resemblance to a human head or skull. Since it is virtually transparent, the creature is nearly impossible to see in its habitat, posing significant danger to swimmers.

When the jellyfish are swimming, the tentacles contract so they are about 150 mm (6 in) long and about 5 mm (0.20 in) in diameter; when they are hunting, the tentacles are thinner and extend to about 3 m (9.8 ft) long. The tentacles are covered with a high concentration of stinging cells called cnidocytes, which are activated by pressure and a chemical trigger; they react to proteinous chemicals. Box jellyfish are day hunters; at night they are seen resting on the ocean floor.

In common with other box jellyfish, C. fleckeri has four eye-clusters with 24 eyes. Some of these eyes seem capable of forming images, but whether they exhibit any object recognition or object tracking is debated; it is also unknown how they process information from their sense of touch and eye-like light-detecting structures due to their lack of a central nervous system. They are attracted to light of different colors (white, red, orange, yellow, green and blue), but blue light seems to elicit a feeding behavior, as it slows down their pulsation rate and makes them stream out their tentacles. Black objects, on the other hand, cause them to move away.

Chironex fleckeri lives on a diet of prawns and small fish, as well as crabs, shrimp (most commonly Acetes sibogae australis) and other pelagic invertebrates. Their only known predators are green sea turtles and leatherback turtles, whose thick skin is impenetrable to the cnidocytes of the jellyfish, among other pelagic predators.

== Distribution and habitat ==
The medusa is pelagic and has been documented from coastal waters of Australia and New Guinea north to the Philippines, Malaysia, Singapore and Vietnam. In Australia, it is known from the northern coasts from Exmouth to Agnes Water, but its full distribution outside Australia has not been properly identified. The closely related and also dangerously venomous Chironex yamaguchii was first described from Japan in 2009. This species has also been documented from the Philippines. Breeding occurs in lower levels of rivers and mangrove channels.

== Sting ==
Chironex fleckeri is best known for its extremely powerful "sting". This sting can produce excruciating pain accompanied by an intense burning sensation, like being branded with a red hot iron. Stings may also result in white welts and lines that may be accompanied by blistering. In some cases, the sting can cause permanent damage or death to the skin and result in scars. Fatalities are most often caused by specimens of C. fleckeri that are larger than 15 cm (5.9 in). If left untreated, large amounts of venom injection can cause fatality in 5 minutes. A number of North American toxicologists recommend applying acetic acids such as vinegar to a sting for around 30 seconds.

In Australia, C. fleckeri has caused at least 64 deaths since the first report in 1883, but most encounters appear to result only in mild envenomation. Among 225 analyzed C. fleckeri stings in Australia's Top End from 1991 to 2004, only 8% required hospital admission, 5% received antivenom and there was a single fatality (a 3-year-old child). 26% experienced severe pain; the remaining experienced moderate to none. Most deaths in recent decades have been children, as their smaller body mass puts them at a higher risk of fatal envenomation. When fatalities do occur, it is usually caused by cardiac arrest occurring within minutes of the sting. It takes approximately 3 metres (10 ft) of tentacle to deliver a fatal dose.

The venom causes cells to become porous enough to allow potassium leakage, causing hyperkalemia, which can lead to cardiovascular collapse and death as quickly as within two to five minutes with an LD_{50} of 0.04 mg/kg. It has been postulated that a zinc compound could be developed as an antidote. Occasionally, swimmers who get stung will undergo cardiac arrest or drown before they can reach the shore or a boat.

In many cases, there will be a reaction that takes place days after the initial sting if the victim survives. This extremely itchy rash can last weeks after the initial sting. If the skin in the affected area is intact, certain creams and antihistamines may help to alleviate the symptoms.

Chironex fleckeri and other jellyfish, including the Irukandji (Carukia barnesi), are abundant in the waters of northern Australia during the warmer months of the year. They are believed to drift into estuaries to breed. Signs like the one pictured are erected along the coast of North Queensland to warn people of such, and few people swim during this period. At popular swimming spots, net enclosures are placed in the water to allow people to swim while preventing jellyfish from entering.

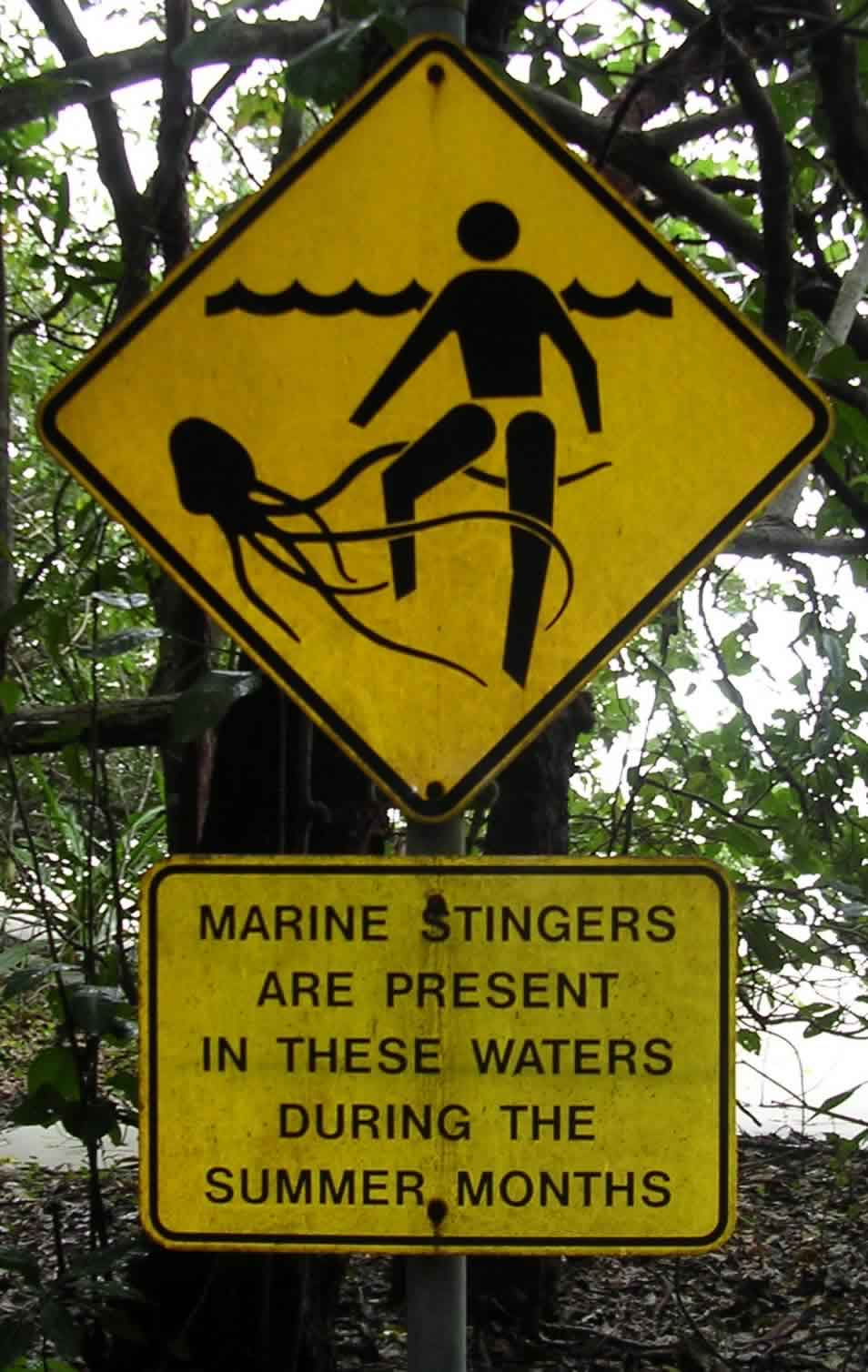
Box jellyfish warning signpost at a Cape Tribulation beach in Queensland, Australia

== History of sting treatment ==
Until 2005, treatment involved using pressure immobilisation bandages, with the aim of preventing distribution of the venom through the lymph and blood circulatory systems. This treatment is no longer recommended by health authorities due to research that showed that using bandages to achieve tissue compression provoked nematocyst discharge.

The application of vinegar is a recommended treatment because vinegar (4–6% acetic acid) permanently deactivates undischarged nematocysts, preventing them from opening and releasing venom. A 2014 study demonstrated in vitro that while vinegar deactivates unfired nematocysts, there was also an increase in venom concentration in the solution, possibly by causing already-fired nematocysts (which still contain some venom) to release what remained. However, this study has been criticized on several methodological grounds, including that the experiment was done using a model membrane that is much different from (and more simple than) human skin. Also, the researchers did not determine whether the increase in venom concentration was caused by already-discharged nematocysts releasing more venom, or if the venom that was released initially had simply leaked back out through the membrane, thus confounding the concentration measurement. Despite these concerns, diluted acetic acid is still the recommended treatment. In 2019, the first antidote for Australian box jellyfish sting was discovered in Australia.

== Reproduction ==
Chironex fleckeri is capable of both sexual and asexual reproduction and are oviparous.

=== Sexual Reproduction ===
A fully grown and sexually mature Chironex fleckeri medusa will begin trying to find a mate in the spring season. Usually, the jellies will move from their usual habitat to a freshwater river for this hunt. If a mate is located, sperm and eggs are expelled into the water by the male and female respectively to result in fertilization. The gametes produced by the spawning process will go on to become planulae and eventually small sea wasp polyps. They will use their two tentacles to hide away from predators by hooking onto a hidden surface and feeding on plankton. The parent organisms die shortly after reproduction occurs.

=== Asexual Reproduction (Budding) ===
Polyps created through spawning will begin to form entirely new clones of themselves through a process called budding. The original polyp along with the new ones will eventually become small medusa through metamorphosis and return to the ocean until they are mature. The process will then repeat once they can sexually reproduce and go back to a river to find a mate.
