= Ronald Vernon Southcott =

Australian medical zoologist (1918–1998)

Ronald Vernon Southcott (15 May 1918 – 9 April 1998) was an Australian medical zoologist specializing in Acari, mites and ticks.

== Biography ==
Southcott was born in Adelaide, a son of Horace Lloyd Southcott (1891–1949), managing director of Southcott Limited, engineers. After finishing school at St Peter's College, Adelaide Southcott started working on mites, or the acari, at the age of 16 with Herbert Womersley the acarologist at the South Australian Museum. Womersley described and named the trombidiid mite, which Southcott had collected on a cycling trip in the hills near Adelaide in 1934, Microtrombidium southcotti, after Southcott. Southcott considered that act by Herb Womersley, "hooked me on mites". Southcott studied medicine at the University of Adelaide where he graduated in 1941. Southcott then served in the Australian Army Medical Corps from 1942 to 1946. While he was stationed at Cairns he started working on the taxonomy and medical effects of jellyfish, the subject for which he was later to become famous. His more than 230 papers on the red mites include a classic revision of the families, subfamilies and genera of the Erythroidea in 1961, for which he received his D.Sc.

Throughout his life Southcott was interested in the medical effects of plants and animals. But the huge bulk of his well illustrated papers are on the systematics of red mites. Southcott was never employed as an acarologist, but served as chairman for the South Australian Museum board for many years. He produced his outstanding mite papers in the evening after a day's work in Adelaide looking after the medical needs of returned servicemen. Many of his papers on mites are hundreds of pages long. His early work on the highly venomous box jellyfish, was one of his first and only papers on the cnidarian, Chironex fleckeri. He also contributed on the medical effects of high liver consumption of Arctic explorers, leading to hypervitaminosis A.

In 1972 Southcott self-published a book 'Studies on incidences and correlations of diseases and immunizations in South Australian schoolchildren 1952–1962.' The data used was from the results of the medical examination of schoolchildren in South Australia, and from the routine questionnaires completed by the parents for public health purposes. The data was codified and then fed into the computer at the division of Mathematical Statistics, CSIRO, in Adelaide. The data were analysed by age and sex of the children, by area of state classifications, and by region of birth. They were analysed using the chi-squared distribution.

Other books he wrote were:

Studies on the epidemiology of the 1947/1948 epidemic of poliomyelitis in South Australia / by R. V. Southcott and N. D. Crosby; with the collaboration of N. S. Stenhouse Southcott, R. V [Book : 1949] At University of Sydney

Studies of the mortality and morbidity of a series of South Australian based veterans : and the interrelationships between mortality, preceding morbidity, and other factors / by R.V. Southcott, L.G. Veitch Southcott, R. V [Book : 1980]

== Family ==
Southcott married Heather Joyce Miller in April 1952.
