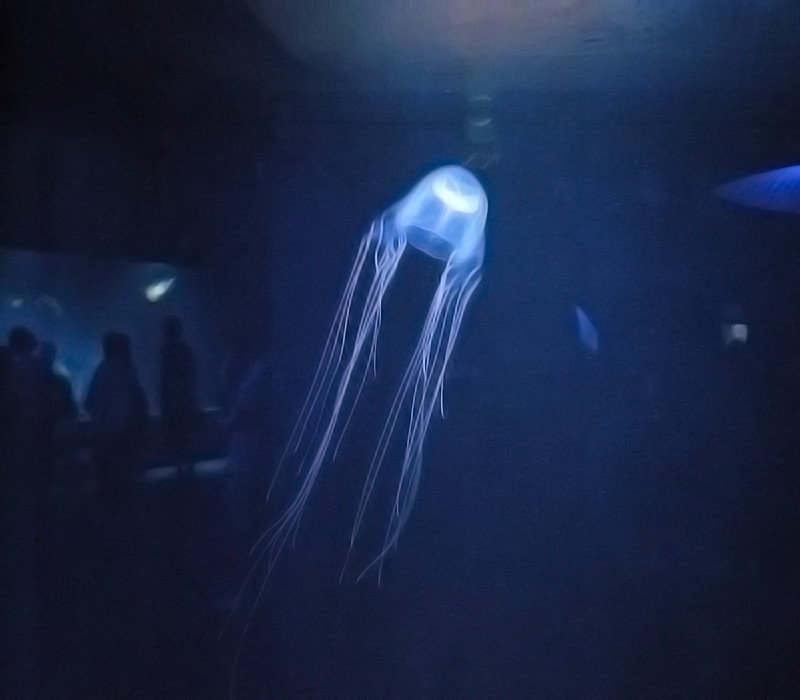
- Chironex yamaguchii at Enoshima Aquarium, Japan

Scientific classification
- Kingdom: Animalia
- Phylum: Cnidaria
- Class: Cubozoa
- Order: Chirodropida
- Family: Chirodropidae
- Genus: Chironex
- Species: C. yamaguchii

Binomial name
- Chironex yamaguchii Lewis & Bentlage, 2009

= Chironex yamaguchii =

Species of jellyfish

Chironex yamaguchii, commonly known as the Okinawa habu jellyfish (Japanese: ハブクラゲ, Hepburn: habu-kurage; often mistranslated as "hub jellyfish") and also translated as "viper jellyfish" or "pit viper jellyfish", is a species of box jellyfish found in coastal waters around Japan (Okinawa and the Ryukyu Islands) and the Philippines. Discovered in 2009, it is highly venomous and has been the cause of several deaths in Japanese waters.

== Taxonomy ==
In the past, this species was considered conspecific with Chiropsalmus quadrigatus found in Malaysia. That name however, is now considered as a nomen dubium and it is no longer recognized as a separate species. It has now been established that Chironex yamaguchii is a different species and is more closely related to Chironex fleckeri, however, the name Chiropsalmus quadrigatus is widely used in the literature.

== Description ==
The medusa is box-shaped and has a maximum height of about 110 millimetres (4.3 in) which is only about one half to one third the size of Chironex fleckeri. On average, however, the animals are much smaller, being more typically 60 millimetres (2.4 in) in height. The maximum inter-radial diameter is 95 millimetres (3.7 in). The outer surface of the bell is smooth in adults, however the bells of juvenile jellyfish are warty. There are four short stalks known as pedalia which carry up to nine tentacles, but on average each bears only seven tentacles (compared with up to fifteen tentacles in Chironex fleckeri). The nematocyst threads are lavender.

The manubrium is cross-shaped with lancet-shaped lips. It measures only about three quarters of the bell height. Each of the four rhopalia has six eyes, two with lenses, and two each of slot and pit pigment eyes. The statolith is oval and is located at the base of each rhopalium. There are eight different types of stinging cells.

== Venom ==
This box jellyfish is highly venomous. The stings cause great pain and have caused several deaths in Japanese waters. The symptoms include cardiac arrest and respiratory failure with acute pulmonary oedema.
