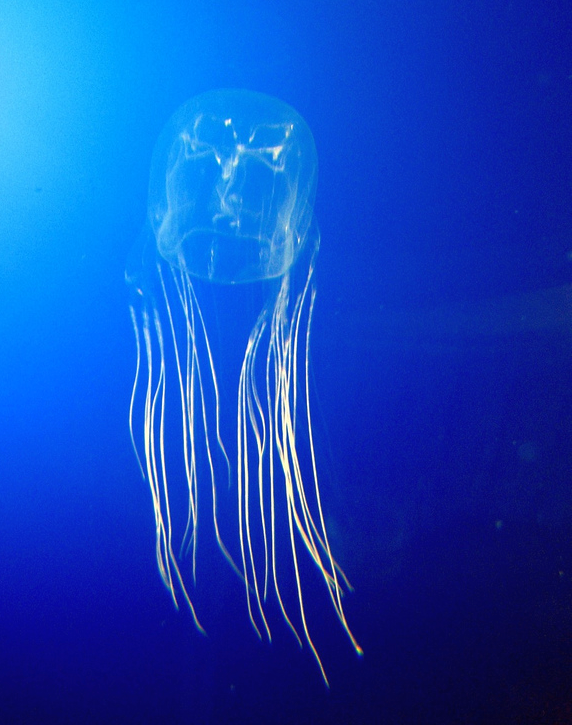
- Chironex
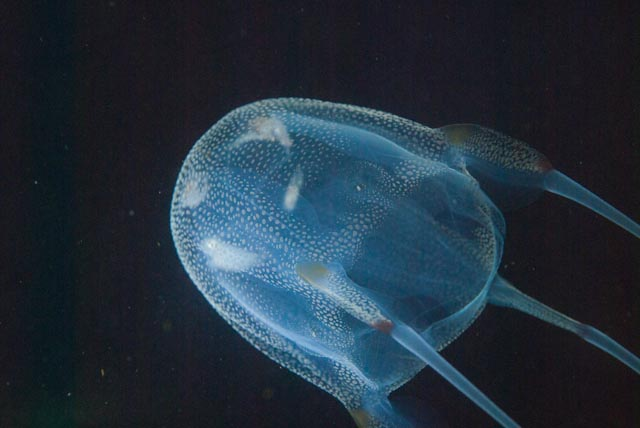
- Carybdea murrayana

Scientific classification
- Kingdom: Animalia
- Phylum: Cnidaria
- Subphylum: Medusozoa
- Class: Cubozoa; Werner, 1973

Orders
- Carybdeida; Chirodropida

= Box jellyfish =

Box jellyfish Temporal range: Middle Cambrian–present

Class of cnidarians distinguished by their cube-shaped medusae

Box jellyfish (class Cubozoa) are cnidarian animals distinguished by their box-like (i.e., cube-shaped) body. Some species of box jellyfish produce potent venom delivered by contact with their tentacles. Stings from some species, including Chironex fleckeri, Carukia barnesi, Malo kingi, and a few others, are extremely painful and often fatal to humans. Some species like the Carybdea murrayana produce a painful sting but are not fatal to humans.

== Taxonomy and systematics ==
Historically, cubozoans were classified as an order of Scyphozoa until 1973, when they were put in their own class due to their unique biological cycle (lack of strobilation) and morphology.

At least 51 species of box jellyfish were known as of 2018. These are grouped into two orders and eight families. A few new species have since been described, and it is likely that additional undescribed species remain.

Class Cubozoa

- Order Carybdeida
  - Family Alatinidae
  - Family Carukiidae
  - Family Carybdeidae
  - Family Tamoyidae
  - Family Tripedaliidae
- Order Chirodropida
  - Family Chirodropidae
  - Family Chiropsalmidae
  - Family Chiropsellidae

== Description ==
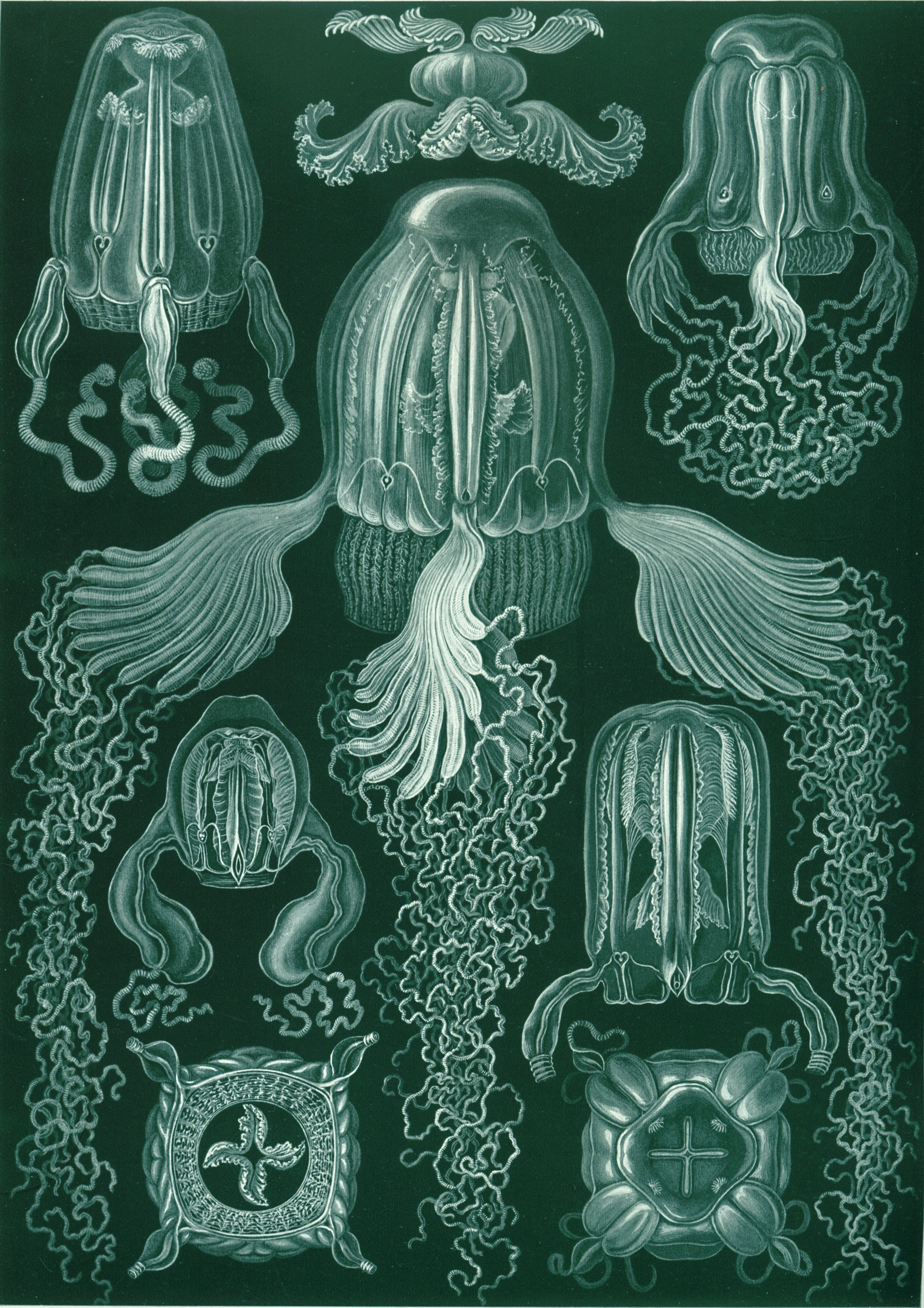
"Cubomedusae", from Ernst Haeckel's Kunstformen der Natur, 1904

The medusa form of a box jellyfish has a squarish, box-like bell, from which its name is derived. From each of the four lower corners of this hangs a short pedalium or stalk which bears one or more long, slender, hollow tentacles. The rim of the bell is folded inwards to form a shelf known as a velarium which restricts the bell's aperture and creates a powerful jet when the bell pulsates. As a result, box jellyfish can move more rapidly than other jellyfish; speeds of up to 1.5 metres per second have been recorded.

In the center of the underside of the bell is a mobile appendage called the manubrium which somewhat resembles an elephant's trunk. At its tip is the mouth. The interior of the bell is known as the gastrovascular cavity. It is divided by four equidistant septa into a central stomach and four gastric pockets. The eight gonads are located in pairs on either side of the four septa. The margins of the septa bear bundles of small gastric filaments which house nematocysts and digestive glands and help to subdue prey. Each septum is extended into a septal funnel that opens onto the oral surface and facilitates the flow of fluid into and out of the animal.

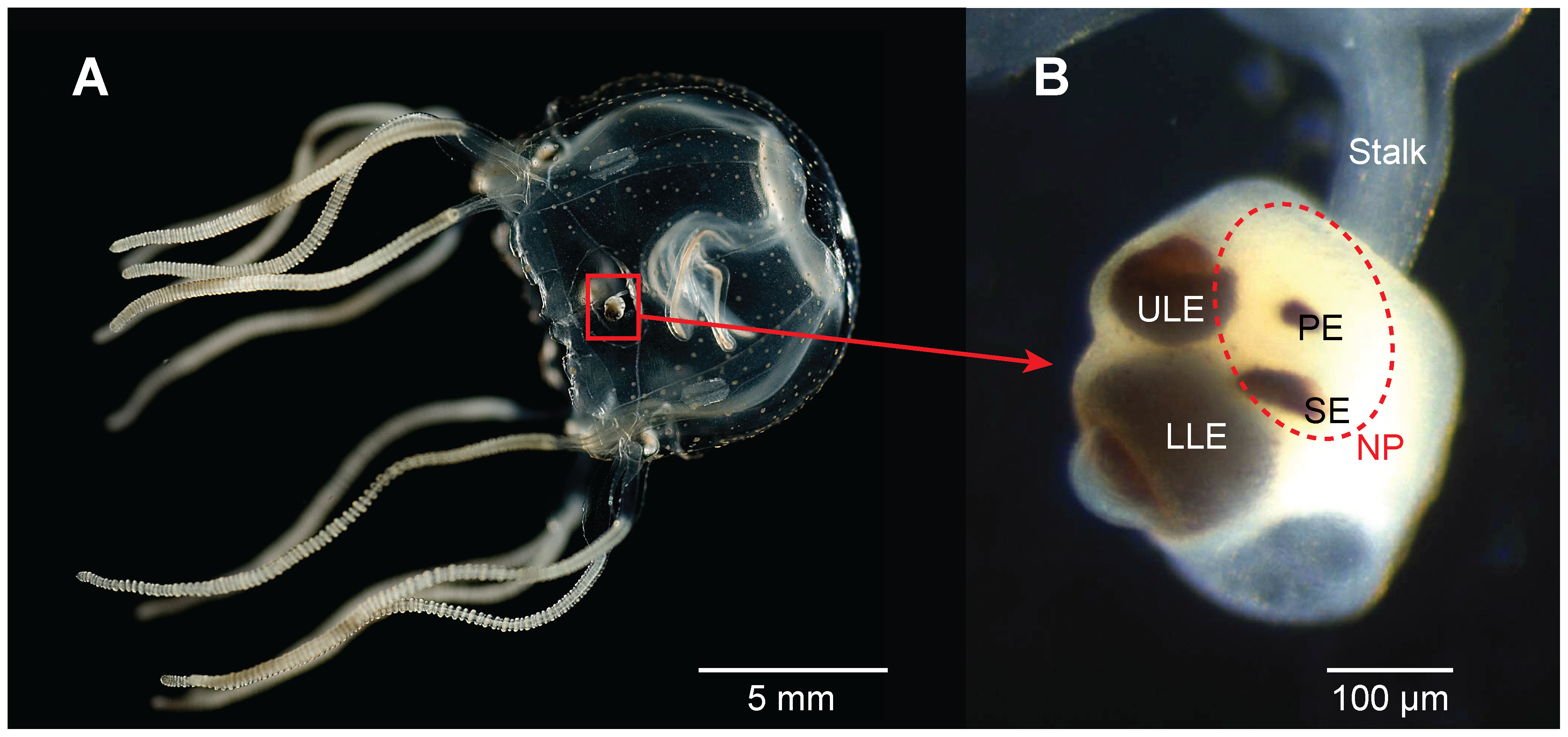
The complex rhopalial ocelli of Tripedalia cystophora

The box jellyfish's nervous system is more developed than that of many other jellyfish. They possess a ring nerve at the base of the bell that coordinates their pulsing movements, a feature found elsewhere only in the crown jellyfish. Whereas some other jellyfish have simple pigment-cup ocelli, box jellyfish are unique in the possession of true eyes, complete with retinas, corneas and lenses. Their eyes are set in clusters at the ends of sensory structures called rhopalia which are connected to their ring nerve. Each rhopalium contains two image-forming lens eyes. The upper lens eye looks straight up out of the water with a field of view that matches Snell's window. In species such as Tripedalia cystophora, the upper lens eye is used to navigate to their preferred habitats at the edges of mangrove lagoons by observing the direction of the tree canopy. The lower lens eye is primarily used for object avoidance. Research has shown that the minimum visual angle for obstacles avoided by their lower lens eyes matches the half-widths of their receptive fields. Each rhopalium also has two pit eyes on either side of the upper lens eye which likely act as mere light meters, and two slit eyes on either side of the lower lens eye which are likely used to detect vertical movement. In total, the box jellyfish have six eyes on each of their four rhopalia, creating a total of 24 eyes. The rhopalia also feature a heavy crystal-like structure called a statolith, which, due to the flexibility of the rhopalia, keep the eyes oriented vertically regardless of the orientation of the bell.

Box jellyfish also display complex, probably visually-guided behaviors such as obstacle avoidance and fast directional swimming. Research indicates that, owing to the number of rhopalial nerve cells and their overall arrangement, visual processing and integration at least partly happen within the rhopalia of box jellyfish. The complex nervous system supports a relatively advanced sensory system compared to other jellyfish, and box jellyfish have been described as having an active, fish-like behavior.

Depending on species, a fully grown box jellyfish can measure up to 20 cm (8 in) along each box side (30 cm or 12 in in diameter), and the tentacles can grow up to 3 m (10 ft) in length. Its weight can reach 2 kg (4 1/2 lb). However, the thumbnail-sized Irukandji is a box jellyfish, and lethal despite its small size. There are about 15 tentacles on each corner. Each tentacle has about 500,000 cnidocytes, containing nematocysts, a harpoon-shaped microscopic mechanism that injects venom into the victim. Many different kinds of nematocysts are found in cubozoans.

== Distribution ==
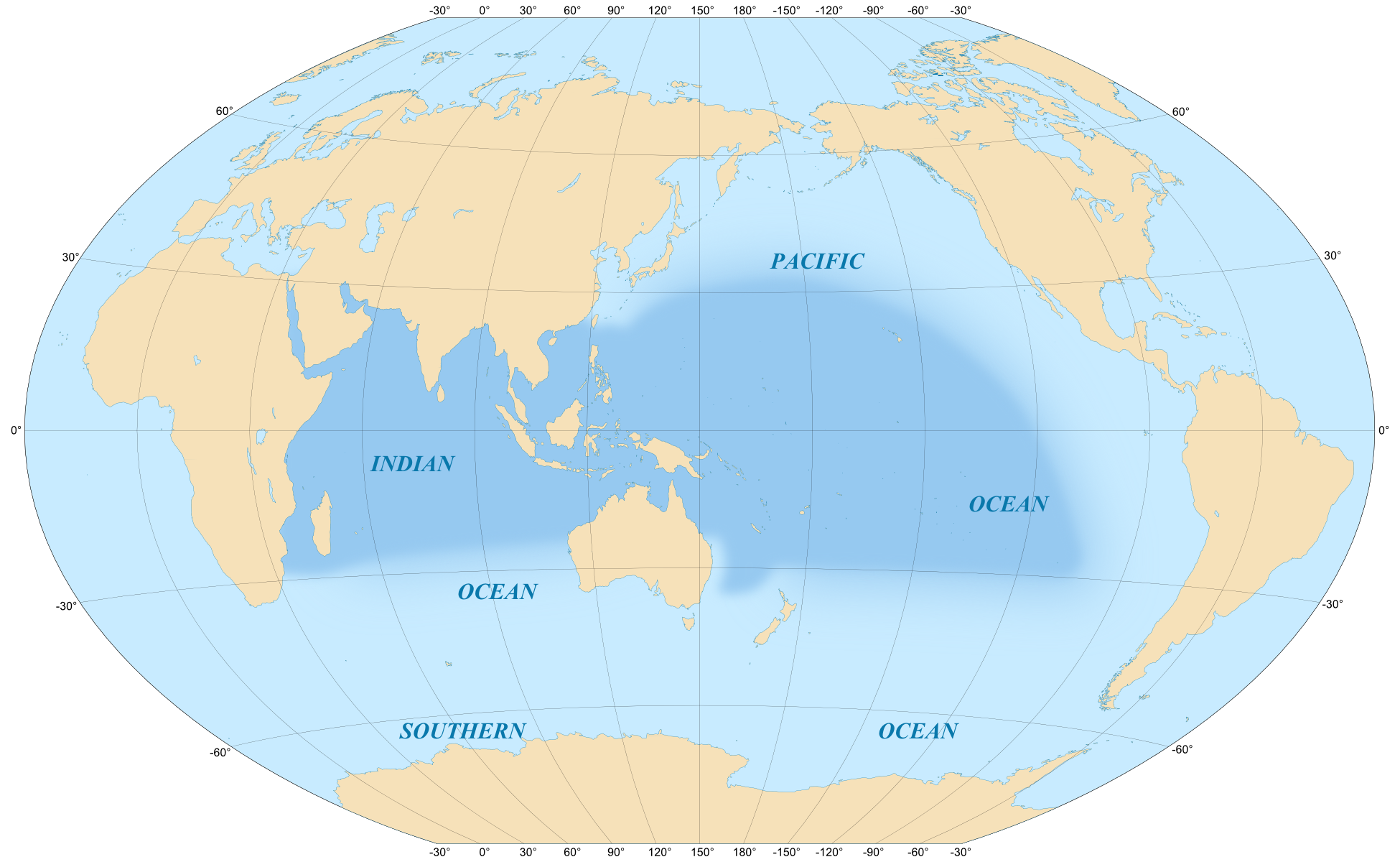
The Indo-Pacific Ocean region

Although the notoriously dangerous species of box jellyfish, such as Chironex species, are largely restricted to the tropical Indo-Pacific region, various species of box jellyfish can be found widely in tropical and subtropical oceans (between 42° N and 42 °S), including the Atlantic Ocean and the east Pacific Ocean, with species as far north as California (Carybdea confusa), the Mediterranean Sea (Carybdea marsupialis) and Japan (such as Chironex yamaguchii), and as far south as South Africa (such as Carybdea branchi) and New Zealand (such as Copula sivickisi). It was only in 2014, that the first ever sightings of Tripedalia cystophora were officially published in Australia, Thailand and the Indian Ocean. There are three known species in Hawaiian waters, all from the genus Carybdea: C. alata, C. rastoni, and C. sivickisi. Within these tropical and subtropical environments, box jellyfish tend to reside closer to shore. They have been spotted in near-shore habitats such as mangroves, coral reefs, kelp forests, and sandy beaches.

Recently, in 2023, a new genus and species of box jellyfish was discovered in the Indo-Pacific region, specifically the Gulf of Thailand. Discovered and named after scientist Lisa-ann Gershwin, this new species of box jellyfish, Gershwinia thailandensis, is a member of the Carukiidae family. Gershwinia thailandensis is described as its own new species as it has sensory structures with specialized horns and lacks a common digestive system among box jelly, the stomach gastric phaecellae. Due to this and other observations, structural and biological, Gershwinia thailandensis was accepted as a new species of box jellyfish.

== Detection ==
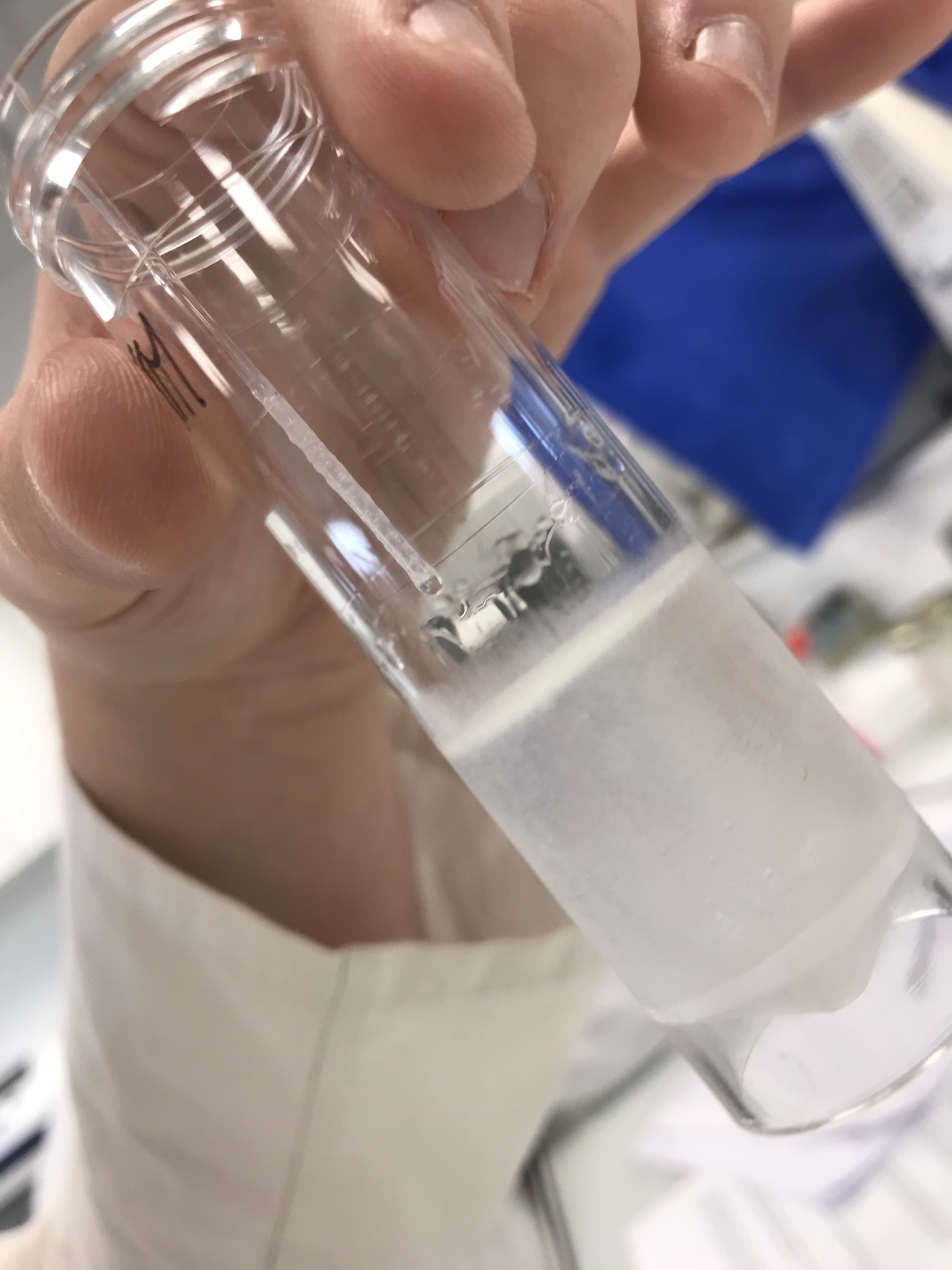
The technique used for the separation of eDNA from the water column using a cellulose nitrate membrane filter.

Cubozoans are widely distributed throughout tropical and subtropical regions, yet the detection of these organisms can be quite difficult and costly due to a high amount of variation in their occurrence and abundance, their translucent body, two different life stages (medusa and polyp), and vast amounts of size variability within the different species in the class Cubozoa.

Understanding the ecological distribution of cubozoans can be difficult work, and some of the costly methods like visual observations, a variety of nets, light attraction techniques, and most recently the use of drones have had some levels of success in locating and tracking different species of cubozoa, but are limited by both anthropogenic and environmental factors.

A new form of detection, environmental DNA (eDNA), has been developed and employed to help aid in the analysis of the populations of box jellyfish which can be implemented to mitigate the effects that box jellyfish have on coastal anthropogenic activities. This relatively easy and cost-effective method utilizes extra-organismal genetic material that can be found in the water column via shedding throughout the lifespan of an organism.

This process for identifying box jellyfish using the eDNA technique involves collecting a water sample and filtering the sample through a cellulose nitrate membrane filter to extract any genetic material from the water sample. Once the DNA is extracted, it is analyzed for species-specific matches to see if the eDNA sequences sampled correlate with existing DNA sequences for box jellyfish. Given the results, the presence or absence of the box jellyfish can be indicated through the matching of genetic material. If a match is found, then the box jellyfish was present in the area. The utilization of eDNA can provide a cost-effective and efficient way to monitor populations of box jellyfish in both medusa and polyp life stages.

== Ecology ==
=== Age and growth ===
It has been found that the statoliths, which are composed of calcium sulfate hemihydrate, exhibit clear sequential incremental layers, thought to be laid down on a daily basis. This has enabled researchers to estimate growth rates, ages, and age to maturity. Chironex fleckeri, for example, increases its inter-pedalia distance (IPD) by 3 mm (1/8 in) per day, reaching an IPD of 50 mm (2 in) when 45 to 50 days old. The maximum age of any individual examined was 88 days by which time it had grown to an IPD of 155 mm (6 in). In the wild, the box jellyfish will live up to 3 months, but can survive up to seven or eight months in a science lab tank.

=== Behavior ===
The box jellyfish actively hunts its prey (small fish), rather than drifting as do true jellyfish. They are strong swimmers, capable of achieving speeds of up to 1.5 to 2 metres per second or about 4 knots (7.4 km/h; 4.6 mph). and rapidly turning up to 180° in a few bell contractions. Some species are capable of avoiding obstacles.

The majority of box jellyfishes feed by extending their tentacles and accelerating for a short time upwards, then turn upside-down and stop pulsating. Then the jellyfish slowly sinks, until prey finds itself entangled by tentacles. At this point the pedalia fold and bring the prey to the oral opening.

The venom of cubozoans is distinct from that of scyphozoans, and is used to catch prey (small fish and invertebrates, including prawns and bait fish) and for defence from predators, which include the butterfish, batfish, rabbitfish, crabs (blue swimmer crab) and various species of turtle including the hawksbill sea turtle and flatback sea turtle. It seems that sea turtles are unaffected by the stings because they seem to relish box jellyfish.

=== Reproduction ===
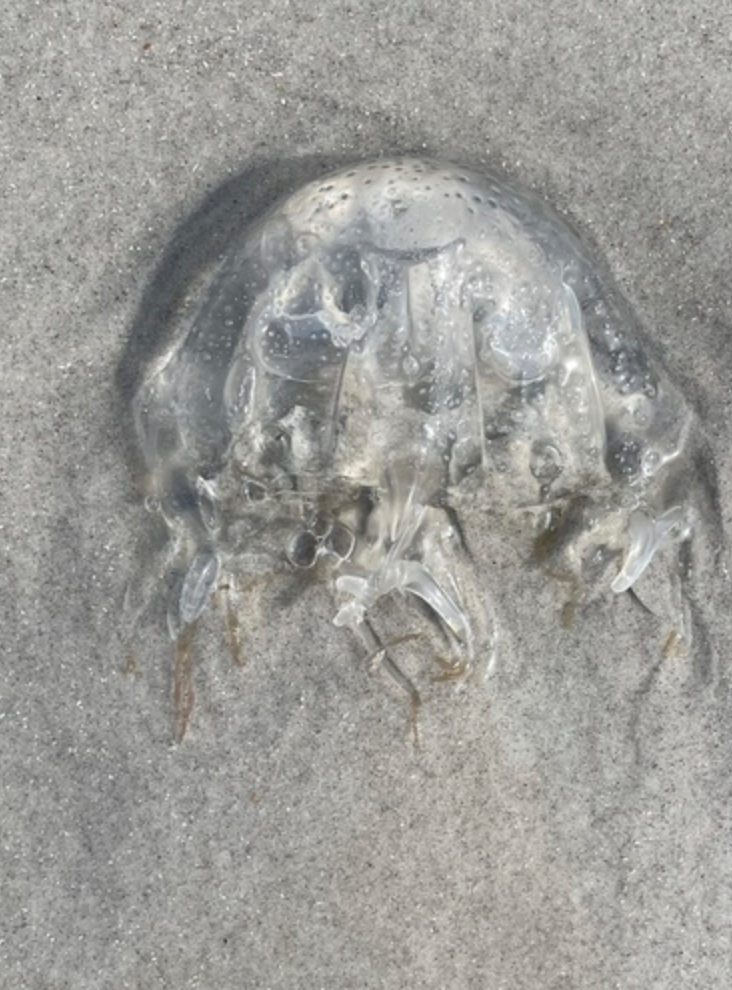
Box jellyfish species Chiropsalmus quadrumanus contradicts the belief that Cubozoans are semelparous.

Cubozoans usually have an annual life cycle. Box jellyfish reach sexual maturity when their bell diameter reaches 5 millimeters. Chirodropida reproduces by external fertilization. Carybdeida instead reproduces by internal fertilization and is ovoviviparous; sperm is transferred by spermatozeugmata, a type of spermatophore. Hours after the fertilization, the female releases an embryo strand that contains its own nematocytes; both euryteles and isorhizas. Cubozoas are the only class of cnidarian that contains species that perform the "wedding dance" to transfer the spermatophores from the male into the females, including the Carybdea sivickisi species.

It is previously believed that medusa species only reproduce once in their life before dying a few weeks later, a semelparity lifestyle. Alternatively, in July 2023, the box jelly species Chiropsalmus quadrumanus, were found to potentially have iteroparous reproduction, meaning they reproduce multiple times in their life. Oogenesis appears to happen numerous times as oocytes are discovered in four stages; pre-vitellogenic, early vitellogenic, mid vitellogenic, and late vitellogenic. Continuous research needs to be conducted to determine if box jellyfish are semelparity or iteroparous, or if it is species dependent.

== Genetics ==
Box jellyfish have a mitochondrial genome that is arranged into eight linear chromosomes. As of 2022, only two Cubozoan species were fully sequenced, Alatina alata and Morbakka virulenta. A. alata has 66,156 genes, the largest gene count for any medusozoan. The mitochondrial genome of box jellyfish is uniquely structured into multiple linear fragments. Each one of the eight linear chromosomes have between one and four genes including two extra genes. These two extra genes (mt-polB and orf314) encode proteins. There are only a few studies that have been completed involving the research of mitochondrial gene expression in box jellyfish.

== Danger to humans ==
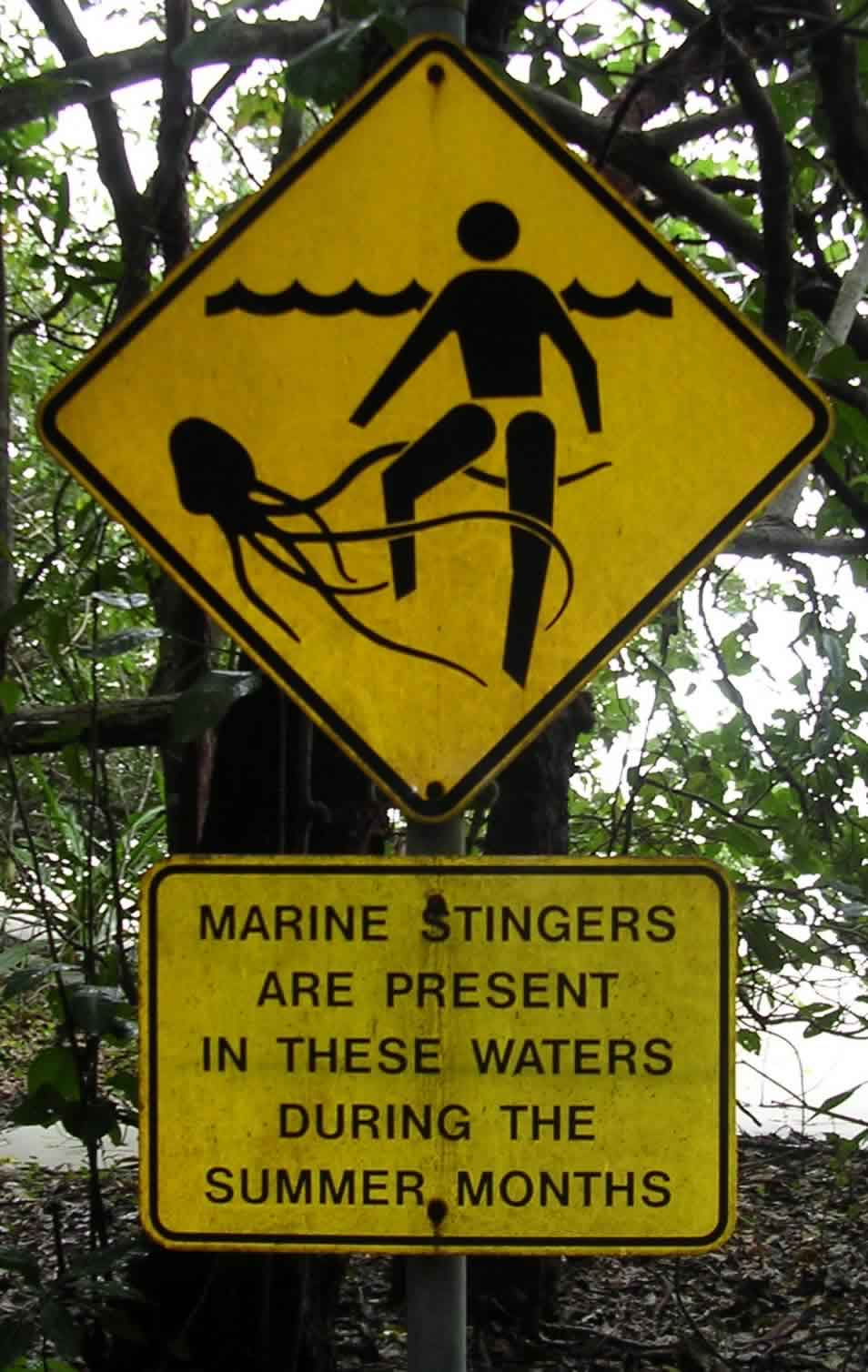
Box jellyfish warning signpost at a Cape Tribulation beach in Queensland, Australia

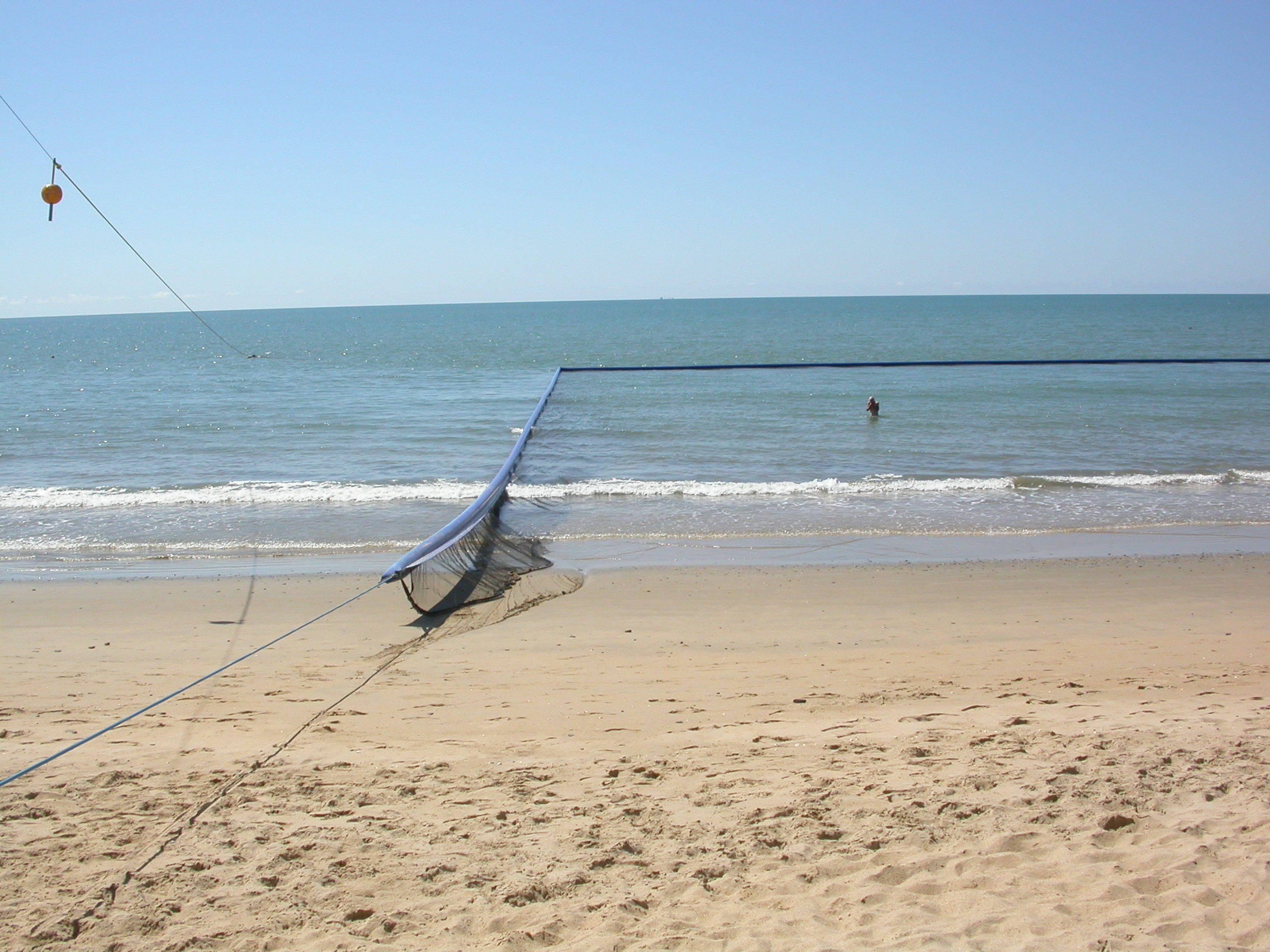
Jellyfish/stinger net exclosure at Ellis Beach, Queensland, Australia

Box jellyfish have been long known for their powerful sting. The lethality of the Cubozoan venom to humans is the primary reason for its research. Although unspecified species of box jellyfish have been called in newspapers "the world's most venomous creature" and the deadliest creature in the sea, only a few species in the class have been confirmed to be involved in human deaths; some species are not deadly to humans, possibly delivering a sting that is no more than painful. When the venom of the box jellyfish was analyzed, more than 170 toxic proteins were identified. The high quantity of toxin proteins that the box jellyfish possess is the reason they are known to be so dangerous. Stings from the box jellyfish can lead to skin irritation, cardiotoxicity, and can even be fatal.

=== Australia ===
Hugo Flecker, who worked on various venomous animal species and poisonous plants, was concerned at the unexplained deaths of swimmers. He identified the cause as the species of box jellyfish later named Chironex fleckeri. In 1945, he described another jellyfish envenoming which he named the "Irukandji Syndrome", later identified as caused by the box jellyfish species Carukia barnesi.

In Australia, fatalities are most often caused by the largest species of this class of jellyfish, Chironex fleckeri, one of the world's most venomous animals. After severe Chironex fleckeri stings, cardiac arrest can occur within two minutes. C. fleckeri has caused at least 79 deaths since the first report in 1883, but even in this species most encounters appear to result only in mild envenoming. While most recent deaths in Australia have been in children, including a 14-year old who died in February 2022, which is linked to their smaller body mass, in February 2021, a 17-year-old boy died about 10 days after being stung while swimming at a beach on Queensland's western Cape York. The previous fatality was in 2007.

At least two deaths in Australia have been attributed to the thumbnail-sized Irukandji box jellyfish. People stung by these may suffer severe physical and psychological symptoms, known as Irukandji syndrome. Nevertheless, most victims do survive, and out of 62 people treated for Irukandji envenomation in Australia in 1996, almost half could be discharged home with few or no symptoms after 6 hours, and only two remained hospitalized approximately a day after they were stung.

Preventative measures in Australia include nets deployed on beaches to keep jellyfish out, and jugs of vinegar placed along swimming beaches to be used for rapid first aid.

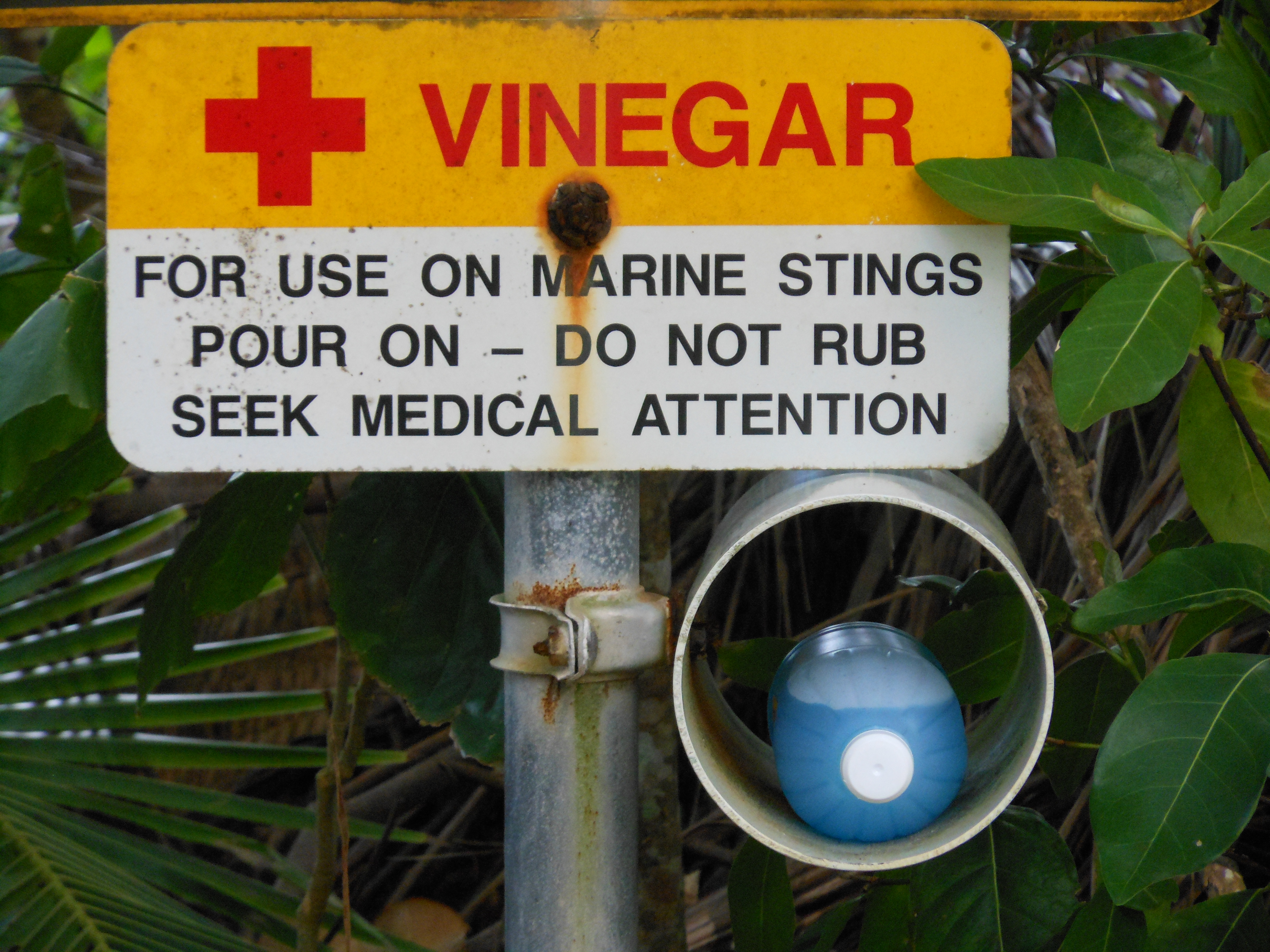
A vinegar post in Queensland, Australia

=== Hawaii: research and dangers ===
Researchers at the University of Hawaiʻi's Department of Tropical Medicine found the venom causes cells to become porous enough to allow potassium leakage, causing hyperkalemia, which can lead to cardiovascular collapse and death as quickly as within 2 to 5 minutes.

In Hawaii, box jellyfish numbers peak approximately seven to ten days after a full moon, when they come near the shore to spawn. Sometimes, the influx is so severe that lifeguards have closed infested beaches, such as Hanauma Bay, until the numbers subside.

=== Malaysia, Philippines, Japan, Thailand, and Texas ===
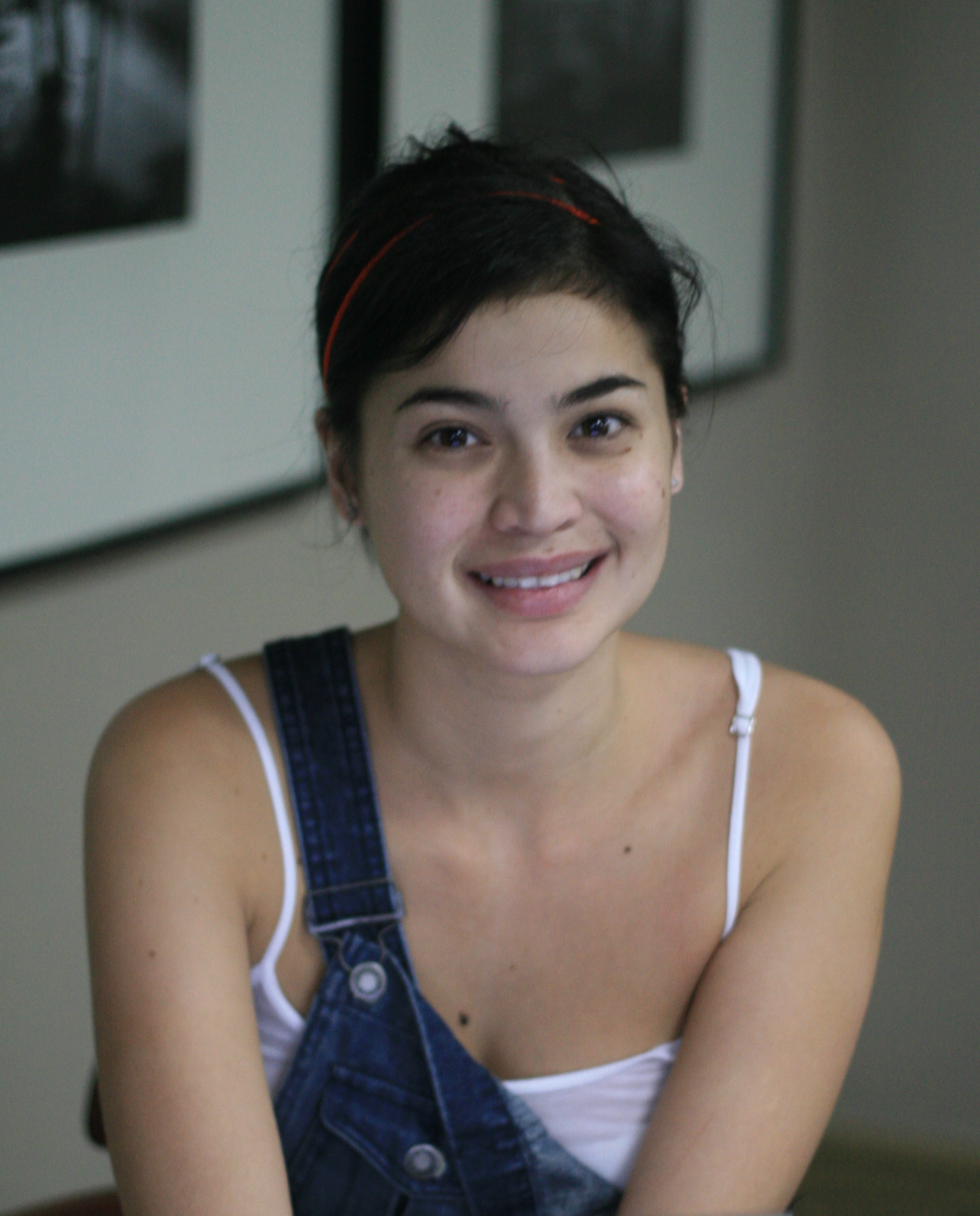
Actress Anne Curtis who got stung by a box jellyfish during taping from Dyesebel in San Juan, Batangas.

In parts of the Malay Archipelago, the number of lethal cases is far higher than in Australia. In the Philippines, an estimated 20–40 people die annually from Chirodropid stings, probably owing to limited access to medical facilities and antivenom.

The very similar species discovered in 2009 Chironex yamaguchii may be equally dangerous, as it has been implicated in several deaths in Japan. It is unclear which of these species is the one usually involved in fatalities in the Malay Archipelago.

Warning signs and first aid stations have been erected in Thailand following the death of a 5-year-old French boy in August 2014. A woman died in July 2015 after being stung off Ko Pha Ngan, and another at Lamai Beach at Ko Samui on 6 October 2015.

In 1990, a 4-year-old child died after being stung by Chiropsalmus quadrumanus at Galveston Island, Texas, on the Gulf of Mexico. Either this species or Chiropsoides buitendijki is considered the likely perpetrator of two deaths in West Malaysia.

== Protection and treatment ==
=== Protective clothing ===
Wearing pantyhose, full body lycra suits, dive skins, or wetsuits is an effective protection against box jellyfish stings. The pantyhose were formerly thought to work because of the length of the box jellyfish's stingers (nematocysts), but it is now known to be related to the way the stinger cells work. The stinging cells on a box jellyfish's tentacles are not triggered by touch, but by chemicals found on skin, which are not present on the hose's outer surface, so the jellyfish's nematocysts do not fire.

=== First aid for stings ===
Once a tentacle of the box jellyfish adheres to skin, it pumps nematocysts with venom into the skin, causing the sting and agonizing pain. Flushing with vinegar is used to deactivate undischarged nematocysts to prevent the release of additional venom. A 2014 study reported that vinegar also increased the amount of venom released from already-discharged nematocysts; however, this study has been criticized on methodological grounds.

The 2025 ANZCOR Guidelines (Guideline 9.4.5 - Envenomation - Jellyfish Stings) states that "In the tropics, because of the risk (even if small) that the victim has been stung by a potentially lethal jellyfish, the priority must be to preserve life. If the species causing the sting cannot clearly be identified as harmless, or due to a “Bluebottle”, it is safer to treat the victim with vinegar". Further information describing the rationale for use of vinegar as first aid is available in a ANZCOR research attachment.

Following the controversy related to the 2014 in-vitro study, a peer-reviewed research article (Yanagihara, 2016) provided further supporting evidence "that vinegar precludes nematocyst discharge and did not corroborate claims that vinegar increased “venom load” or primary activity in our sting models. In fact, the opposite effect was observed; vinegar application appeared to reduce venom-induced hemolysis when applied onto adherent tentacles, although the reduction was not significant. Our array allowed us to evaluate vinegar in several contexts, thus solidly evaluating its actual efficacy". "Based on these data, we conclude that current first-aid protocols for jellyfish stings, including the removal of tentacles by the application of vinegar, do prohibit further cnidae discharge and do not elicit adverse outcomes".

Research results (Yanagihara, 2017) gave further supporting evidence for the safety and effectiveness of vinegar as a first aid response to two cubozoan (box jellyfish) species (Chironex fleckeri and Alatina alata), stating that "vinegar not only prevented cnidae discharge in vitro, dousing tentacles with it prior to removal significantly reduced the amount of venom delivered in our blood agarose model. Some have suggested that the addition of vinegar increases the venom exuded from already-discharged cnidae. We found no evidence for this in our data. If the application of vinegar caused an increase in venom deposition from already-discharged cnidae, then we would have expected an increased zone of hemolysis after its application. Instead, the opposite occurred. Thus, we conclude that there is no evidence that vinegar application induces further venom release from discharged cnidae, and that vinegar should be considered a safe rinse solution for cubozoan stings. We also found that dilutions of vinegar progressively led to a reduction in the ability to prevent cnidae discharge, thus vinegar should not be diluted prior to its use".

Vinegar is made available on Australian beaches and in other places with venomous jellyfish.

Removal of additional tentacles is usually done with a towel or gloved hand, to prevent secondary stinging. Tentacles can still sting if separated from the bell or after death. Removal of tentacles may cause unfired nematocysts to come into contact with the skin and fire, resulting in a greater degree of envenomation.

Although commonly recommended in folklore and even some papers on sting treatment, there is no scientific evidence that urine, ammonia, meat tenderizer, sodium bicarbonate, boric acid, lemon juice, fresh water, steroid cream, alcohol, cold packs, papaya, or hydrogen peroxide will disable further stinging, and these substances may even hasten the release of venom. Heat packs have been proven for moderate pain relief. The use of pressure immobilization bandages, methylated spirits, or vodka is generally not recommended for use on jelly stings.

=== Possible antidotes in humans ===
In 2011, researchers at the University of Hawaiʻi at Mānoa announced that they had developed an effective treatment against the stings of Hawaiian box jellyfish by "deconstructing" the venom contained in their tentacles. Its effectiveness was demonstrated in the PBS Nova episode "Venom: Nature's Killer", originally shown on North American television in February 2012. Their research found that injected zinc gluconate prevented the disruption of red blood cells and reduced the toxic effects on the cardiac activity of research mice. It was later found that copper gluconate was even more effective. A cream containing copper gluconate has been produced, to be applied to inhibit the injected venom; although it is used by U.S. military divers, evidence that it is effective in humans is only anecdotal.

In April 2019, a team of researchers at the University of Sydney announced that they had found a possible antidote to Chironex fleckeri venom that would stop pain and skin necrosis if administered within 15 minutes of being stung. The research was the result of work done with CRISPR whole genome editing in which the researchers selectively deactivated skin-cell genes until they were able to identify ATP2B1, a calcium transporting ATPase, as a host factor supporting cytotoxicity. The research showed the therapeutic use of existing drugs targeting cholesterol in mice, although the efficacy of the approach had not been demonstrated in humans.
