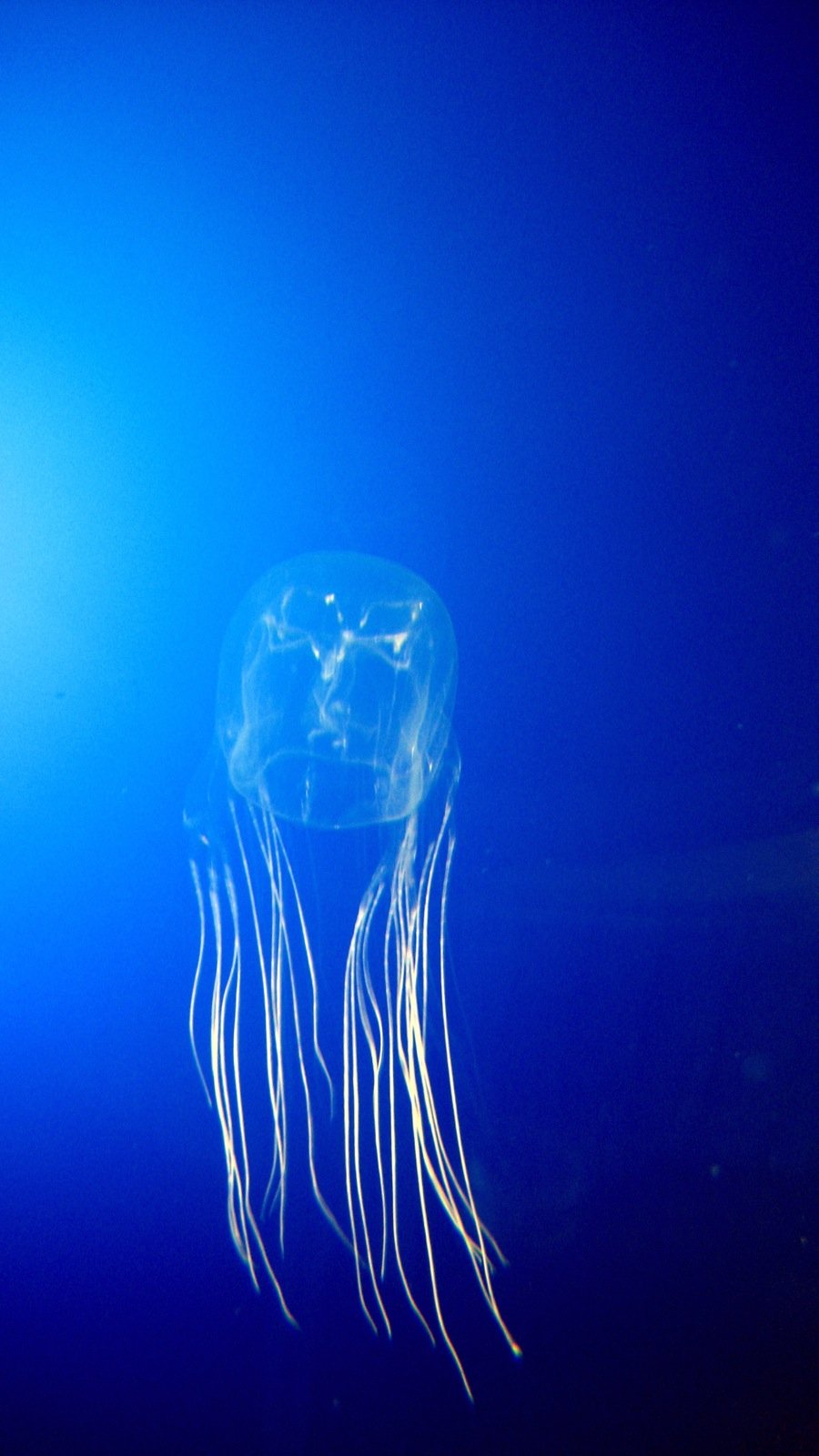
- Chironex sp.

Scientific classification
- Domain: Eukaryota
- Kingdom: Animalia
- Phylum: Cnidaria
- Class: Cubozoa
- Order: Chirodropida; Haeckel, 1880

Families
- Chirodropidae Haeckel, 1880; Chiropsalmidae Thiel, 1936; Chiropsellidae Toshino, Miyake & Shibata, 2015

= Chirodropida =

Order of jellyfishes

Chirodropida is an order of box jellyfishes. They can be distinguished from other box jellyfish by the presence of branched muscular bases at the corners of their cubic umbrella, and of small saccules associated with the gastric cavity. They typically have multiple tentacles at each corner.
