= Jack Barnes (toxinologist) =

Australian toxinologist

John Handyside (Jack) Barnes MBE (1922–1985) was a physician and toxinologist in Queensland, Australia. Born in Charleville he is known for his research on the box jellyfish.

In 1961, Barnes confirmed the cause of the Irukandji syndrome was a sting from a small box jellyfish: the Irukandji jellyfish, which can fire venom-filled stingers out of its body and into passing victims. To prove that the jellyfish was the cause of the syndrome, he captured one and deliberately stung himself, his 9-year-old son and a local lifeguard, then observed the resulting symptoms. Other cubozoans possibly can cause Irukandji syndrome; those positively identified include Carukia barnesi, Alatina mordens, Alatina alata, Malo maxima, Malo kingi, Carybdea xaymacana, Keesingia gigas, an as-yet unnamed "fire jelly", and another unnamed species.

He determined that the use of methylated spirits applied to the area of an Irukandji sting would prevent any tentacles remaining on the skin from inflicting further stings, whereas rubbing to remove the tentacles would cause further stings with the risk of an even more severe reaction. However, vinegar is now the preferred first-response method of treating such stings and many at-risk beaches have a bottle of vinegar available for this purpose.

He also established that the Irukandji toxin would not discharge on a synthetic surface and so wore pantyhose when collecting specimens, a practice now adopted by lifesavers at risk of jellyfish stings.
