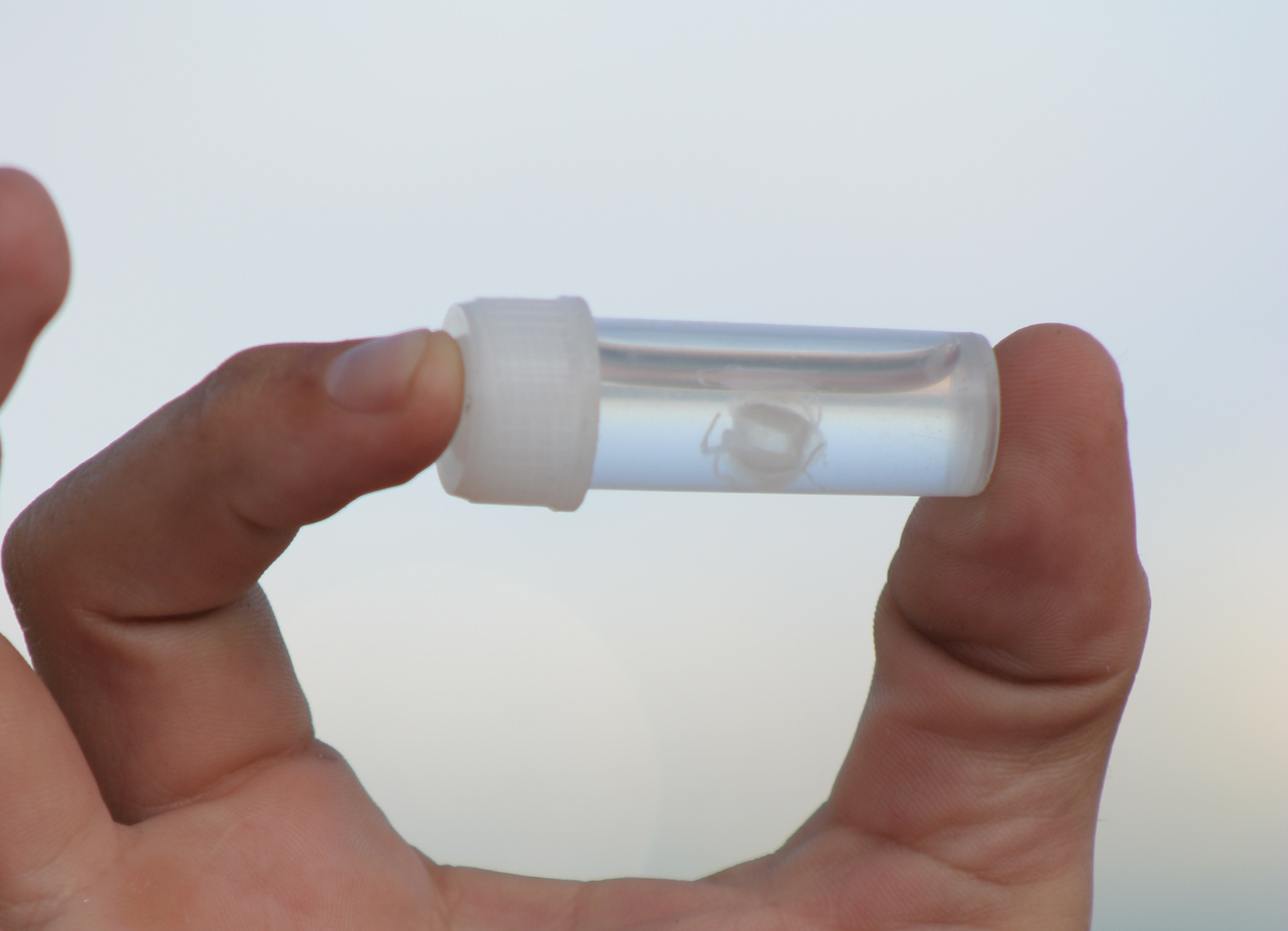
- Malo kingi

Scientific classification
- Kingdom: Animalia
- Phylum: Cnidaria
- Class: Cubozoa
- Order: Carybdeida
- Family: Carukiidae
- Genus: Malo; Gershwin, 2005

Species
- See text

= Malo (cnidarian) =

Genus of Irukandji jellyfish

Malo is a genus of box jellyfish in the order Carybdeida. It has four known species, three of which were described by the Australian marine biologist Lisa-Ann Gershwin. The genus was discovered in 2005. All known species in the genus are considered Irukandji jellyfish and are capable of causing Irukandji syndrome. Malo consists entirely of species that are very small and nearly invisible in water, making them hard to capture and study, and they appear to be solitary animals.

== Etymology ==
The name Malo is derived by the first two letters of the name of Mark Longhurst, who survived a severe sting by a jellyfish apparently from the genus shortly before the publication of its discovery. The author, Gershwin, also noted the "interesting coincidence that the word "malo" is Spanish for "bad", as this species is presumed to be capable of lethal envenomation. Gender masculine."

== Taxonomy ==
- Family: Carukiidae
- Genus: Malo
  - Malo bella Gershwin, 2014
  - Malo filipina Bentlage & Lewis, 2012
  - Malo kingi Gershwin, 2007
  - Malo maxima Gershwin, 2005

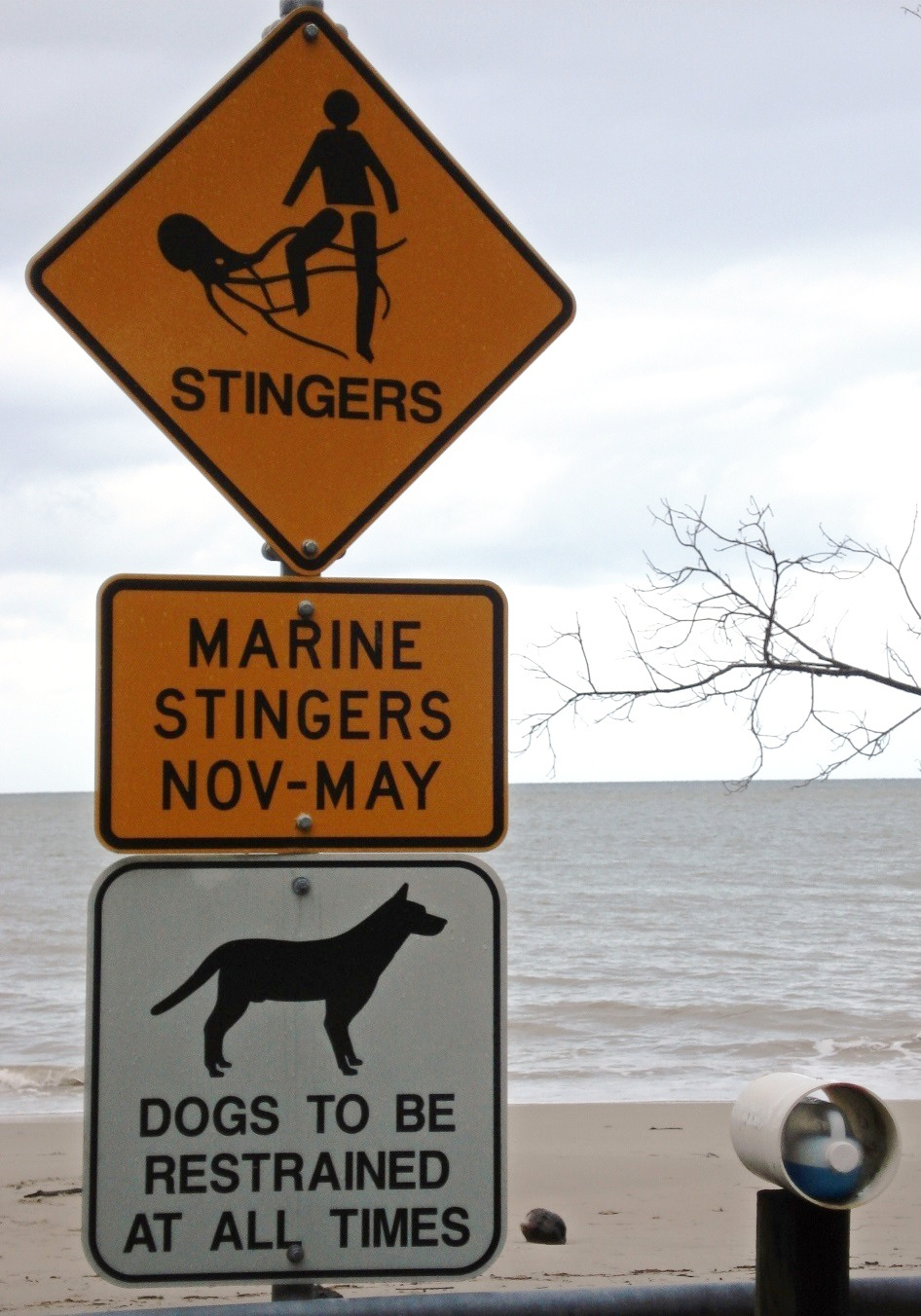
Stingers Signs in Australia

== Geographic range ==
Malo maxima and Malo kingi are mostly found on the coast of the Northern Territory and Western Australia. Malo bella is mostly found in the Indo-Pacific, while Malo filipina has been found off the coast of Luzon and in waters near Hong Kong. There are unconfirmed reports of Malo species in Hawaii, Florida, Papua New Guinea, the French West Indies, and Bonaire. There is an undescribed species of Malo that is found only in Exmouth, Western Australia. eDNA (environmental DNA) has been widely used in determining the range of Malo species.

== Anatomy and morphology ==
Malo species are incredibly small and nearly transparent, making identification difficult. Malo is in the family Carukiidae, and members of the genus can be distinguished from other box jellyfish by their small size and the presence of nematocysts on the bell. Malo species also lack cirri clumps (gastric phacellae) in the stomach. Like all Carybdeida, Malo species have a cubic bell with a tentacle at each corner. The maximum bell height is 2–5 cm with a flat apex. The tentacles are round in cross-section and are very fine. The medusa bell is tall and narrow with four unbranched pedalia at the corners. The pedalial shape is narrow with a knee-shaped canal bend.

Malo species contain frown-shaped rhopalial niche openings where they are undivided on the upper and lower covering. There are 2 median eyes that are lensed per rhopalium and lack laterals. Laterals are thought to aid in peripheral filtering. It is unknown if Malo has less visual ability or have evolved to no longer need lateral eyes. Malo jellies have rhopaliar horns above the rhopalial niches that are nonvenomous. The horns are broad curved, and short with their function unknown.

The Malo genus are box jellies and are extremely toxic. The nematocysts that release the toxins are segmented on the pedalium. The tentacular nematocysts are often adhered to the skin after they are expelled. The species Malo kingi has mammillation which are a collection of stinging cells on the apex and walls of the bell.

== Further research and pharmacology ==
With climate change there have been an increase in blooms of Irukandji jellies. Further research is being conducted on an anti-venom and medical research. As stings have become more pervasive on the coast of Australia there has been an increase in funding for research. The venom from the species Malo maxima have been successfully studied in the cardiovascular tissue of rats. The venom puts the sympathetic and nervous system into overdrive. Stimulating the sensory nerve CGRP into the left atria and resistance arteries. Malo maxima have provided evidence of the biochemical effects of Irukandji venom.
