= Carukia shinju =

Scientific classification
- Domain: Eukaryota
- Kingdom: Animalia
- Phylum: Cnidaria
- Class: Cubozoa
- Order: Carybdeida
- Family: Carukiidae
- Genus: Carukia
- Species: C. shinju

Binomial name
- Carukia shinju Gershwin, 2005

Species of jellyfish

Carukia shinju is a small and venomous jellyfish found off the waters of northwestern Australia. Specifically, located offshore of the coasts of Australian states including Queensland, The Northern Territory, Western Australia and South Australia.

Stings can result in Irukandji syndrome. The mechanisms of actions of their toxins are not completely understood, but evidence shows they include modulation of neuronal sodium channels leading to large releases of endogenous catecholamines that can lead to possible stress-induced cardiomyopathy.
