= Irukandji =

Irukandji may refer to:

- Irukandji people or Yirrganydji people, a group of Australian Aboriginals
- Irukandji jellyfish, a type of small, extremely venomous jellyfish
- The Irukandjis, the Australian national surfing team at the Summer Olympics

== See also ==
- Irukandji syndrome, resulting from the sting of an Irukandji jellyfish
