= Carukiidae =

Scientific classification
- Kingdom: Animalia
- Phylum: Cnidaria
- Class: Cubozoa
- Order: Carybdeida
- Family: Carukiidae; Bentlage, Cartwright, Yanagihara, Lewis, Richards & Collins, 2010

Genera
- See text

Family of jellyfishes

Carukiidae is a family of box jellyfish within the Cubozoa class. Carukiidae can be easily classified by their lack of cirri clumps inside the cubozoan stomach, as well as the size and the placement of their nematocysts.

Carukiidae use nematocysts as a defense mechanism; they releases a venom from the tips of their nematocysts, producing the Irukandji syndrome. Even though positions of spines on the shaft of the Carukiidae cause illness, there are areas on the body that do not. The rhopalial niche openings, which discern light, do not incur any illness. The Carukiidae also have non-venomous rhopaliar horns, which are imperceptive in function and located above the rhopalial niches.

Irukandji syndrome triggered by Carukiidae requires immediate medical attention. In the event that it goes untreated in humans, cardiac arrest is a potentially deadly consequence.

== Classification ==
- Carukia
  - Carukia barnesi Southcott, 1967
  - Carukia shinju Gershwin, 2005
- Gerongia
  - Gerongia rifkinae Gershwin & Alderslade, 2005
- Malo
  - Malo bella Gershwin, 2014
  - Malo filipina Bentlage & Lewis, 2012
  - Malo kingi Gershwin, 2007
  - Malo maxima Gershwin, 2005
- Morbakka
  - Morbakka fenneri Gershwin, 2008
  - Morbakka virulenta (Kishinouye, 1910)
