= Magnesium sulfate (medication) =

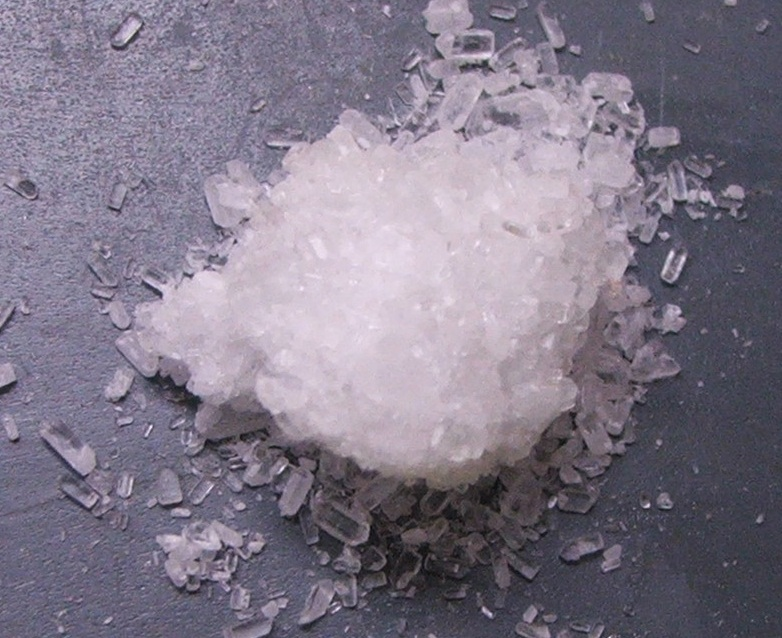
- Magnesium sulfate heptahydrate

Clinical data
- AHFS/Drugs.com: Monograph
- Routes of administration: By mouth, topical, intramuscular, intravenous
- ATC code: A06AD04 (WHO) A12CC02 (WHO). B05XA05 (WHO). D11AX05 (WHO). V04CC02 (WHO)

Identifiers
- CAS Number: 7487-88-9; heptahydrate: 10034-99-8
- PubChem CID: 24083
- DrugBank: DB00653
- ChemSpider: 22515
- UNII: ML30MJ2U7I; heptahydrate: SK47B8698T
- ChEBI: CHEBI:32599
- ChEMBL: ChEMBL2021423

Chemical and physical data
- Formula: MgSO_{4}·7H_{2}O
- Molar mass: 246.47 (heptahydrate)
- 3D model (JSmol): Interactive image
- SMILES: [O-]S(=O)(=O)[O-].[Mg+2]
- InChI: InChI=1S/Mg.H2O4S/c;1-5(2,3)4/h;(H2,1,2,3,4)/q+2;/p-2; Key:CSNNHWWHGAXBCP-UHFFFAOYSA-L

Magnesium sulfate as a medication is used to treat and prevent low blood magnesium and seizures in women with eclampsia. It is also used in the treatment of torsades de pointes, severe asthma exacerbations, constipation, and barium poisoning. It is given by injection into a vein or muscle as well as by mouth. As Epsom salt, it is also used for mineral baths.

Common side effects include low blood pressure, skin flushing, and low blood calcium. Other side effects may include vomiting, muscle weakness, and decreased breathing. While there is evidence that use during pregnancy may harm the baby, the benefits in certain conditions are greater than the risks. Its use during breastfeeding is deemed to be safe. The way it works is not fully understood, but is believed to involve depressing the action of neurons.

Magnesium sulfate came into medical use at least as early as 1618. It is on the World Health Organization's List of Essential Medicines. In 2021, magnesium salts were the 211th most commonly prescribed medication, with more than 2 million prescriptions.

== External uses ==
=== Bath salts ===
Magnesium sulfate is used in bath salts, especially for foot baths to soothe sore feet. The reason for the inclusion of the salt is partially cosmetic: the increase in ionic strength prevents some of the temporary skin wrinkling (partial maceration) which would occur with plain water baths.

Epsom salt baths have been claimed to also soothe and hasten recovery of muscle pain, soreness, or injury. However, these claims have not been scientifically confirmed. The solubility of magnesium sulfate water is inhibited by lipids in lotions resulting in variable absorption rates when applied to the skin. Temperature and concentration are also factors.

==== Research ====
Research on topical magnesium (for example Epsom salt baths) is limited.

=== Isolation tanks ===
Magnesium sulfate is commonly used in flotation therapy to prepare the concentrated solutions that fill the isolation tanks. Its high solubility in water yields baths with high specific gravity that make the body more buoyant. Its negligible toxicity is an important asset in that application.

=== Mineral waters ===
Magnesium and sulfate ions are naturally present in some mineral waters.

=== Drawing paste ===
In the United Kingdom, a medication containing magnesium sulfate, called "drawing paste", is claimed to be useful for small boils or localised infections, and removing splinters. The standard British Pharmacopoeia composition is dried magnesium sulfate 47.76% (by mass), phenol 0.49%, and glycerol to balance.

== Internal uses ==
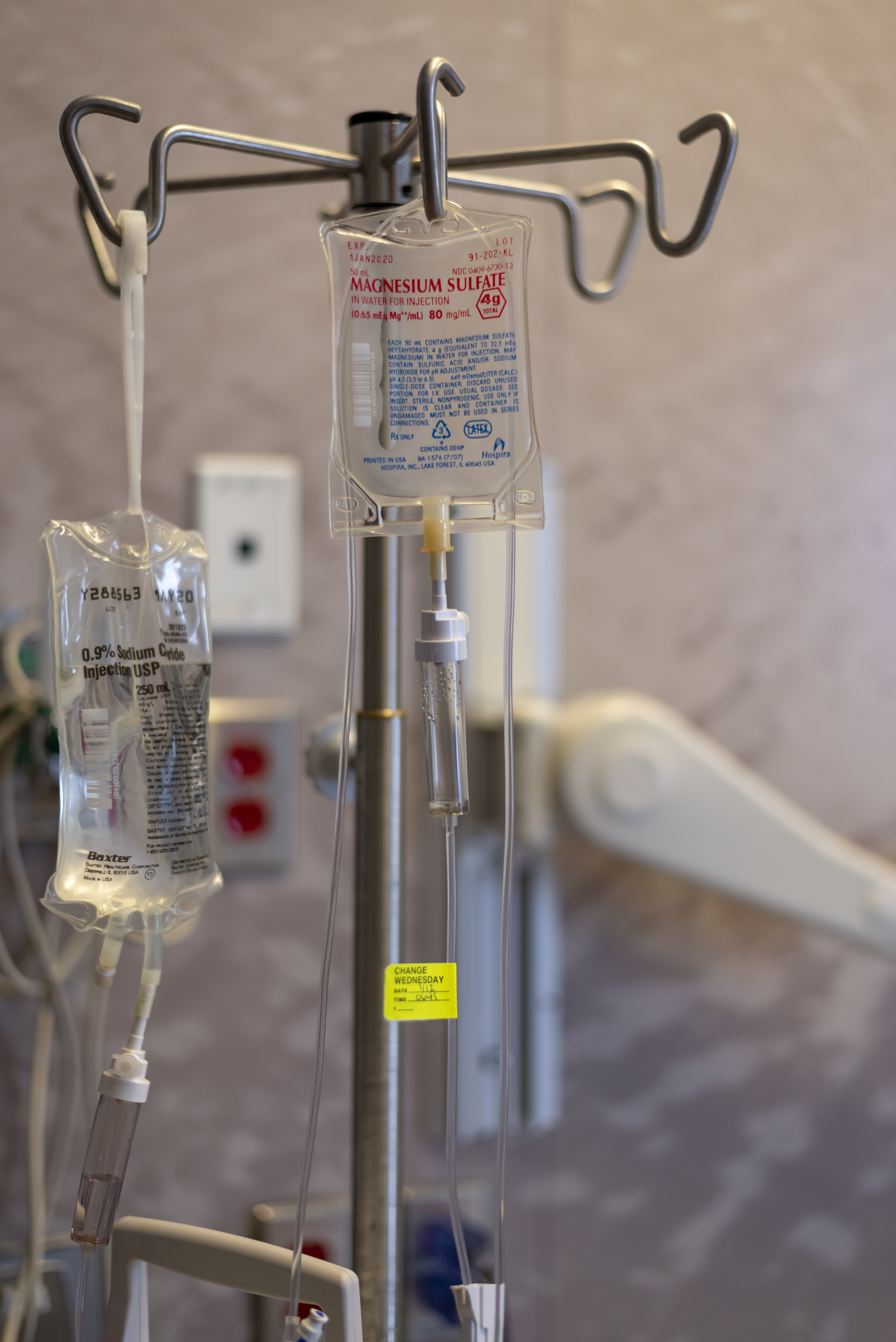
Intravenous piggyback of a bag of magnesium sulfate solution

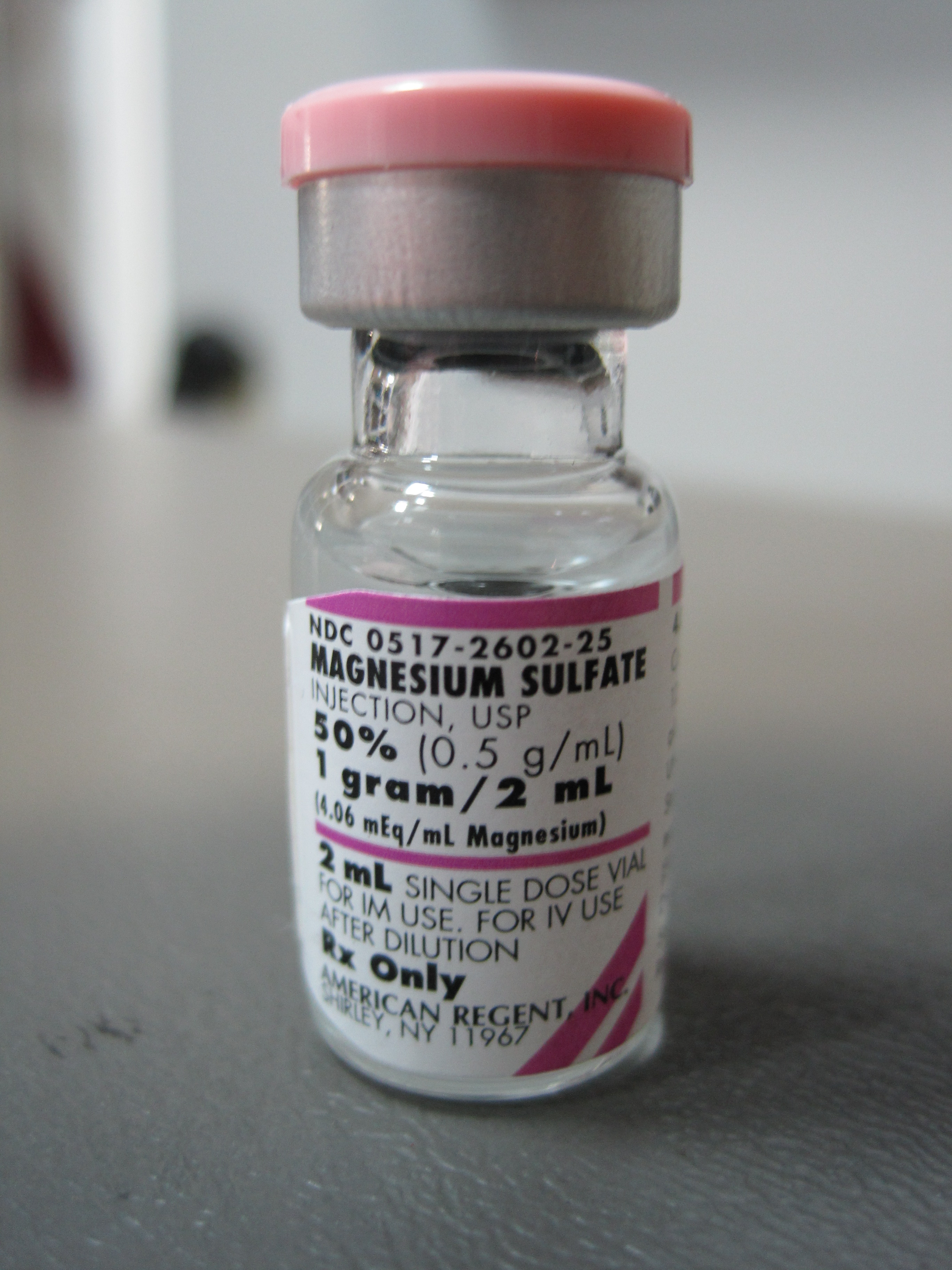
Vial of magnesium sulfate for injection

Magnesium sulfate can be administered internally by oral, respiratory, intravenous, or intrathecal routes.

=== Magnesium deficiency ===
Injected magnesium sulfate is used as a replacement therapy for magnesium deficiency.

Orally administered magnesium sulfate is laxative and thus the magnesium is not well absorbed

=== Arrhythmia ===
Magnesium sulfate may be used as an antiarrhythmic agent for torsades de pointes in cardiac arrest under the ECC guidelines and for managing quinidine-induced arrhythmias.

=== Asthma ===
Magnesium sulfate may be used as bronchodilator after beta-agonist and anticholinergic agents have been tried, e.g. in severe exacerbations of asthma, The salt can be administered by nebulization or by intravenous injection.

=== Eclampsia ===
Magnesium sulfate is effective in decreasing the risk that pre-eclampsia progresses to eclampsia. Intravenous magnesium sulfate is used to prevent and treat seizures of eclampsia. It reduces the systolic blood pressure but does not alter the diastolic blood pressure, so the blood perfusion to the fetus is not compromised. It is also commonly used for eclampsia where compared to diazepam or phenytoin it results in better outcomes.

=== Early delivery ===
Magnesium sulfate was once used as a tocolytic, but meta-analyses have failed to support it as an anti-contraction medication. Usage for prolonged periods (more than five to seven days) may result in health problems for the baby.

In those at risk of an early delivery (preterm birth), treatment with magnesium sulfate has a neuroprotective role and decreases the risk of cerebral palsy. The World Health Organization strongly recommends use of magnesium sulfate for women with risk of imminent birth before 32 weeks of gestation. It is unclear if it helps those who are born at term. Guidelines for the use of magnesium sulfate in mothers at risk of preterm labour are not strongly adhered to and the effects of this treatment later in early childhood are unknown.

=== Barium chloride poisoning ===
Magnesium sulfate is used to treat barium chloride poisoning, where sulfate binds to barium to form insoluble barium sulfate.

=== Lead poisoning ===
Magnesium sulfate was historically used as a treatment for lead poisoning. Prior to the development of chelation therapy, cases of accidental lead ingestion were often immediately treated with magnesium sulfate, which would cause the lead to be precipitated out and, with a high enough dose, literally purged from the digestive system as insoluble lead(II) sulfate. In this application, magnesium sulfate saw particular use in veterinary medicine of the early-to-mid 20th century; Epsom salt was already available on many farms for agricultural purposes, and it was often prescribed in the treatment of farm animals which inadvertently ingested lead.

=== Adjuvant to local anesthetics ===
Magnesium sulfate can be administered intrathecally with opioids to prolong their analgesic duration.

=== Analgesia ===
Magnesium sulfate has some NMDA receptor antagonsim, which may help potentiate the action of other analgesics, and is used to aid in pain control during surgeries by anesthesiologists.

== Forms ==
Magnesium sulfate is available as magnesium sulfate dihydrate, magnesium sulfate heptahydrate, and magnesium sulfate monohydrate.

=== Heptahydrate ===
The World Health Organization recommends magnesium sulfate heptahydrate for medical injection.

== Research ==
Magnesium sulfate has been used as an experimental treatment of Irukandji syndrome caused by envenomation by certain species of Irukandji jellyfish, but the efficacy of this treatment remains unproven.
