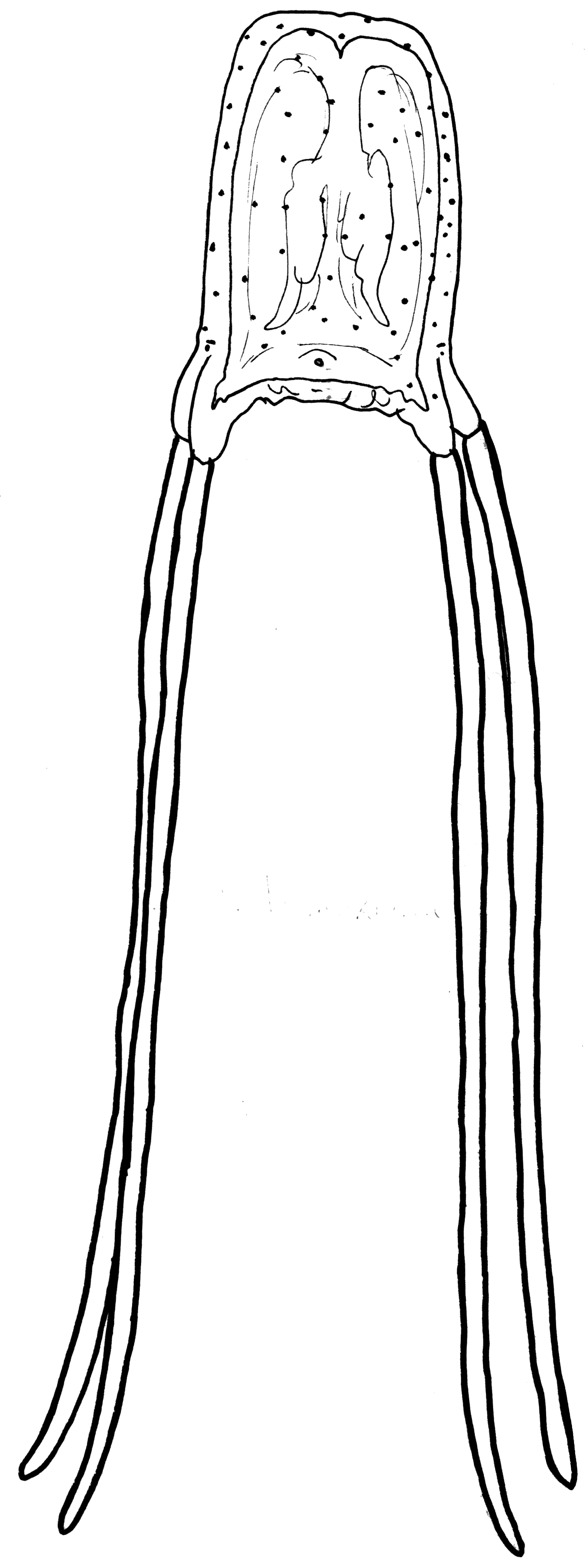
- Drawing of medusa

Scientific classification
- Kingdom: Animalia
- Phylum: Cnidaria
- Class: Cubozoa
- Order: Carybdeida
- Family: Carukiidae
- Genus: Malo
- Species: M. maxima

Binomial name
- Malo maxima Gershwin, 2005

= Malo maxima =

Species of jellyfish

Malo maxima is a small, and extremely dangerous Irukandji jellyfish that is known to cause Irukandji syndrome. It is one of the four species of Malo, along with Malo bella, Malo filipina, and Malo kingi. The Malo maxima was first described in 2005 by Lisa-ann Gershwin, who also described the Malo bella and Malo kingi jellyfish along with over 200 other species of jellyfish.

== Phylogeny ==
Malo maxima has a tall, narrow, robust body with a flattened apex and measures to about 5 cm. Even though it is very small, Malo maxima is the largest member of its genus. The individuals are also translucent, making them very difficult for the human eye to see easily.

Research from the scientific paper “Early Life History and Metamorphosis in Malo maxima” showed that the metamorphosis of Malo maxima from a sessile (immobile) polyp into a free-swimming medusa took 111 days following fertilization.

== Distribution ==
Irukandji jellyfish can be found in oceans all around the world, however Malo maxima can only be found in the tropical western Australian waters, specifically the Broome region. It is believed that Malo maxima have specific habitat preferences considering they tend to live in similar regions. However, there is currently no solid evidence to back up this theory because scientists have still not identified their polyp states. The Irukandji jellyfish does not tend to be close to shore but every now and then they wander into a close proximity to shore. This tends to be the only time humans come into contact with Irukandji jellyfish unless it is bloom season. The sign that Irukandji jellyfish are in the area includes sea lice felt in the water and clusters of salps.

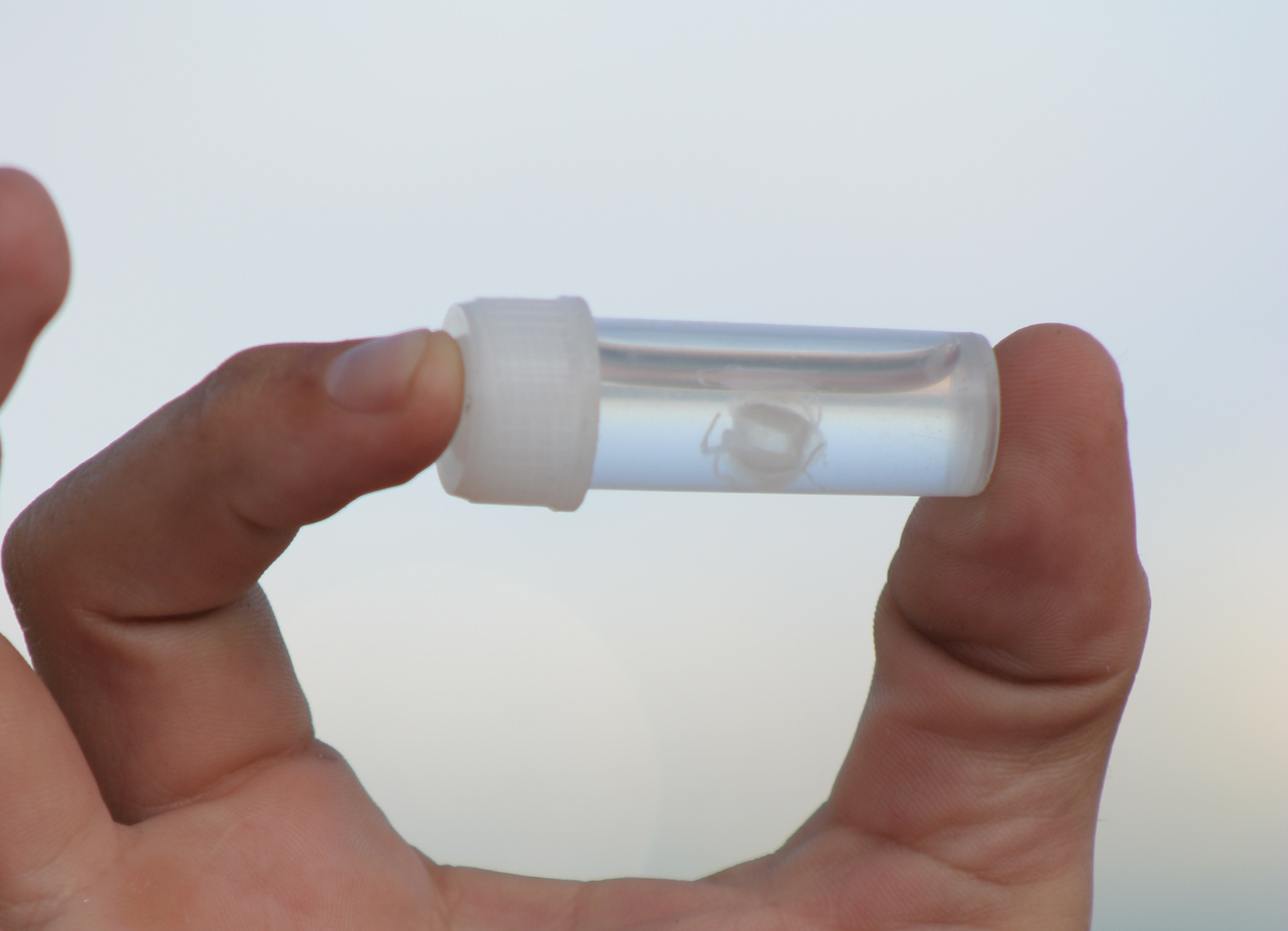
Specimen of the related M. kingi

== The sting and venom ==
The sting of all Irukandji jellyfish is believed to cause Irukandji syndrome and can be potentially fatal, however the sting of the Malo maxima is the most dangerous of the Malo species. Only two types of species have the venom to cause Irukandji syndrome, the Irukandji jellyfish and the box jelly. The box jelly is extremely more venomous than the Irukandji jellyfish. Stings from a box jelly are much more fatal than those of an Irukandji jellyfish, however that does not make Irukandji stings any less dangerous and painful. Irukandji syndrome can cause sweating, anxiety, muscle spasm, severe hypertension and potentially late hypotension and cardiac failure. The sting site has minimal local reaction and does not take effect right away and becomes worse as time goes on. Scientists have just recently figured out how the venom of the Malo maxima affects the heart. The venom causes a concentration-dependent inotropic responses in the left atria of the heart, however it has no effect on the right atria. It appears that the venom does not activate the parasympathetic nervous system, but the sympathetic nervous system. The venom also stimulates the sensory nerve CGRP to release in only the left atria and the resistance arteries. The most effective therapy for Irukandji syndrome seems to be an intravenous infusion of magnesium.

== Blooms ==
Australia experiences extreme jellyfish blooms, specifically Irukandji jellyfish blooms. The Irukandji jellyfish blooms include Malo maxima as well as the other types of Irukandji. Human activity such as catching fish and pollution are making them a more common occurrence. These blooms take a toll on the ecosystems around them. They also make it difficult for ships to get through and make the water extremely dangerous for divers.
