= Gerongia =

Scientific classification
- Kingdom: Animalia
- Phylum: Cnidaria
- Class: Cubozoa
- Order: Carybdeida
- Family: Carukiidae
- Genus: Gerongia
- Species: G. rifkinae

Binomial name
- Gerongia rifkinae Gershwin & Alderslade, 2005

Genus of jellyfishes

Gerongia is a genus of box jellyfish in the Carukiidae family.

== Species ==
The World Register of Marine Species lists the following species:

- Gerongia rifkinae Gershwin & Alderslade, 2005
