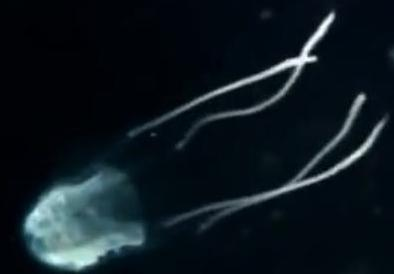

Scientific classification
- Kingdom: Animalia
- Phylum: Cnidaria
- Class: Cubozoa
- Order: Carybdeida
- Family: Carukiidae
- Genus: Carukia
- Species: C. barnesi

Binomial name
- Carukia barnesi Southcott, 1967

= Carukia barnesi =

Species of jellyfish

Carukia barnesi is an extremely venomous box jellyfish found near Australia. Stings can result in Irukandji syndrome, and this species is commonly known as Irukandji jellyfish, although this name does not distinguish it from other Irukandji jellyfish such as Malo kingi.

A mature C. barnesi's bell is only 12 by 30 millimetres (0.47 by 1.18 in) in height. It has four contractile tentacles, one extending from each bottom "corner" of its bell, ranging in length from 5 to 50 centimetres (2.0 to 19.7 in).

The species was discovered by Jack Barnes of Cairns, Australia. While on an exploration mission aimed at determining the reason for Irukandji syndrome, Barnes allowed himself, a lifeguard, and his 9-year-old son to be stung by the jellyfish.

Carukia barnesi is a soft-bodied marine organism. This species falls within the Medusozoa subphylum and the Cubozoa class. It is a type of "box jellyfish" that is known for producing potent venom and is known for inflicting the Irukandji syndrome.

== Threat to humans ==
The Irukandji syndrome was first discovered after a group of swimmers were stung in the open water near North Queensland, Australia. Victims of the sting reported severe symptoms of muscle aches, back pain, nausea, headaches, chest and abdominal pains, sweating, high blood pressure and difficulty breathing. Intravenous administration of morphine, hydromorphone or fentanyl is used to treat patients with this syndrome. Pethidine is avoided due to the toxic metabolite norpethidine because of the high amounts needed to achieve pain relief.

Most reported incidents have been localized to Australia during the warm summer season. Due to the small size of C. barnesi (approximately 20 mm in diameter and 25 mm in depth of the bell), they often go undetected in the open water.

== Description ==
The structure of C. barnesi follows that of a box jellyfish- it has a square-shaped bell structure and long tentacles that extend out of the four corners of its base. The tentacles house the nematocysts which are stinging cells.Type I nematocysts (homotrichous microbasic rhopaloids) and Type II nematocysts (homotrichous haplonemes) are both found on the tentacles and bells of the species. Muscle cells in the tentacles bring food to its mouth, where it then enters a gastric cavity and is digested. The nematocysts are capable of producing venom that changes composition as C. barnesi matures to adulthood and prey changes from invertebrates (zooplankton and crustaceans) to vertebrates (fish).

== Life cycle ==
Cubozoans follow a life cycle that alternates between young benthic sessile polyps and adult motile pelagic medusae. The cycle begins with a planula larvae. This planula will continue to swim until it finds a substrate that it can use as support. Once the planula attaches to a substrate like a coral reef or rock, the organism will morph into a polyp. This polyp can remain asexual for extended periods of time. Eventually, the polyp will begin to clone and form a polyp colony. As it continues to acquire nutrients, the colony will develop into an adult medusa.
