= Morbakka fenneri =

Scientific classification
- Kingdom: Animalia
- Phylum: Cnidaria
- Class: Cubozoa
- Order: Carybdeida
- Family: Carukiidae
- Genus: Morbakka
- Species: M. fenneri

Binomial name
- Morbakka fenneri Gershwin, 2008

Species of jellyfish

Morbakka fenneri, also known as the Moreton Bay stinger or the fire jelly, is a small box jellyfish found in the waters of Australia and Thailand. It has a transparent bell shape with four mauve colored tentacles that are each 50cm long. Additionally, they have various warts, which contain nematocysts, the source of their venom. It is hard to capture this jellyfish to study it due to its small size, fragility, toxicity, and similarity to other species of box jellyfish.

Morbakka fenneri is a relatively rare species of jellyfish, only occasionally found and solitary. Unfortunately, since they aren’t very well studied, there is no information about the life cycle, reproduction, general behavior or relationships with other organisms and the environment.

The sting from this species results in symptoms similar to Irukandji syndrome. The wound is typically 10mm wide and is followed by an immediate burning sensation. If left untreated, it can become necrose, pruritic, and vesicule.
