= Morbakka =

Scientific classification
- Domain: Eukaryota
- Kingdom: Animalia
- Phylum: Cnidaria
- Class: Cubozoa
- Order: Carybdeida
- Family: Carukiidae
- Genus: Morbakka; Gershwin, 2008

Species
- See text

Genus of jellyfishes

Morbakka is a genus of box jellyfish in the Carukiidae family.

== Species ==
The World Register of Marine Species lists the following two species:

- Morbakka fenneri Gershwin, 2008
- Morbakka virulenta (Kishinouyea, 1910)
