= The Thing About Jellyfish =

Children's novel by Ali Benjamin

- Author: Ali Benjamin
- Cover artist: Terry Fan and Eric Fan; design by Marcie Lawrence
- Language: English
- Genre: Children's novel
- Published: 2015
- Publisher: Little, Brown Books for Young Readers
- Publication place: United States
- Pages: 352
- ISBN: 978-0316380867

The Thing About Jellyfish is a 2015 children's novel written by Ali Benjamin, her fiction debut.

== Plot summary ==
The book follows Suzy Swanson, the protagonist and narrator, who theorizes the death of her friend Franny Jackson was caused by a jellyfish sting. Suzy has started seventh grade, which is second year at Eugene Field Middle School in South Grove, Massachusetts. During their sixth grade year, Franny became interested in boys and started to join a more popular social circle than the sometimes awkward Suzy, who had been best friends with Franny starting shortly after they met, when they were both five years old. After the two had a falling out in the sixth grade year, Franny died during the ensuing summer before they had a chance to heal their friendship. Suzy discovers a ton more about jellyfish than she expected she would, and confides in her science teacher, who helps her form her theory. Suzy also reads about brave and daring scientists who study jellyfish, and tries to get in contact with them, to work as a team to try and prove her theory about Franny's death.

== Development ==
Benjamin cites The Secret Garden, Harriet the Spy, and From the Mixed-Up Files of Mrs. Basil E. Frankweiler as shaping her reading life as a child. The Thing About Jellyfish was inspired in part by a trip Benjamin took to an aquarium, and influenced a novel she had been developing about a girl in middle school and her sibling.

=== Jellyfish research ===
Suzy postulates that Franny's death was the result of Irukandji syndrome after Suzy learns about jellyfish on a field trip to an unnamed aquarium, which Benjamin states is the New England Aquarium in the end notes. While researching the subject, Suzy identifies the following real-life jellyfish experts she thinks could ask for help:

1. Dhugal Lindsay (Japan), who also writes haiku
2. Diana Nyad (America), who was forced to abandon several attempts to swim from Cuba to Florida due to jellyfish stings
3. Angel Yanagihara (America), who studied box jellyfish after she nearly died from a sting
4. Jamie Seymour (Australia), who survived an Irukandji sting

=== Publication history ===
- — (September 22, 2015). The Thing About Jellyfish. Hachette. ISBN 9780316380836.

== Reception ==
Publishers Weekly gave the novel a starred review, calling it "a shining example of the highs and lows of early adolescence, as well as a testament to the grandeur of the natural world." Jacqueline Kelly, reviewing for The New York Times, said it was "heartfelt and fascinating" and believed "a lot of children [...] might not only benefit from this book but also [would] find themselves deeply moved by it."

=== Awards ===
The Thing About Jellyfish was nominated for 2015 National Book Award. School Library Journal named the novel to one of its Best Books of 2015.

== Adaptations ==
A theatrical adaptation starring Matilda Lawler premiered at Berkeley Rep on February 1, 2025, and ran until March 9.

Reese Witherspoon announced in October 2015 on her Instagram feed that her company, Pacific Standard Films, would create a film based on the novel. In January 2017, OddLot Entertainment acquired the screen rights to the novel. Gigi Pritzker, Bruna Papandrea, and Witherspoon were named as the producers. In March 2019, it was announced that Wanuri Kahiu would be directing the film, with Millie Bobby Brown starring as Suzy. Other than Netflix acquiring the film in 2021, there has been no further news about the adaptation.

== See also ==
- Goodbye Stranger, by Rebecca Stead
- Otherwise Known as Possum, by Maria Laso
