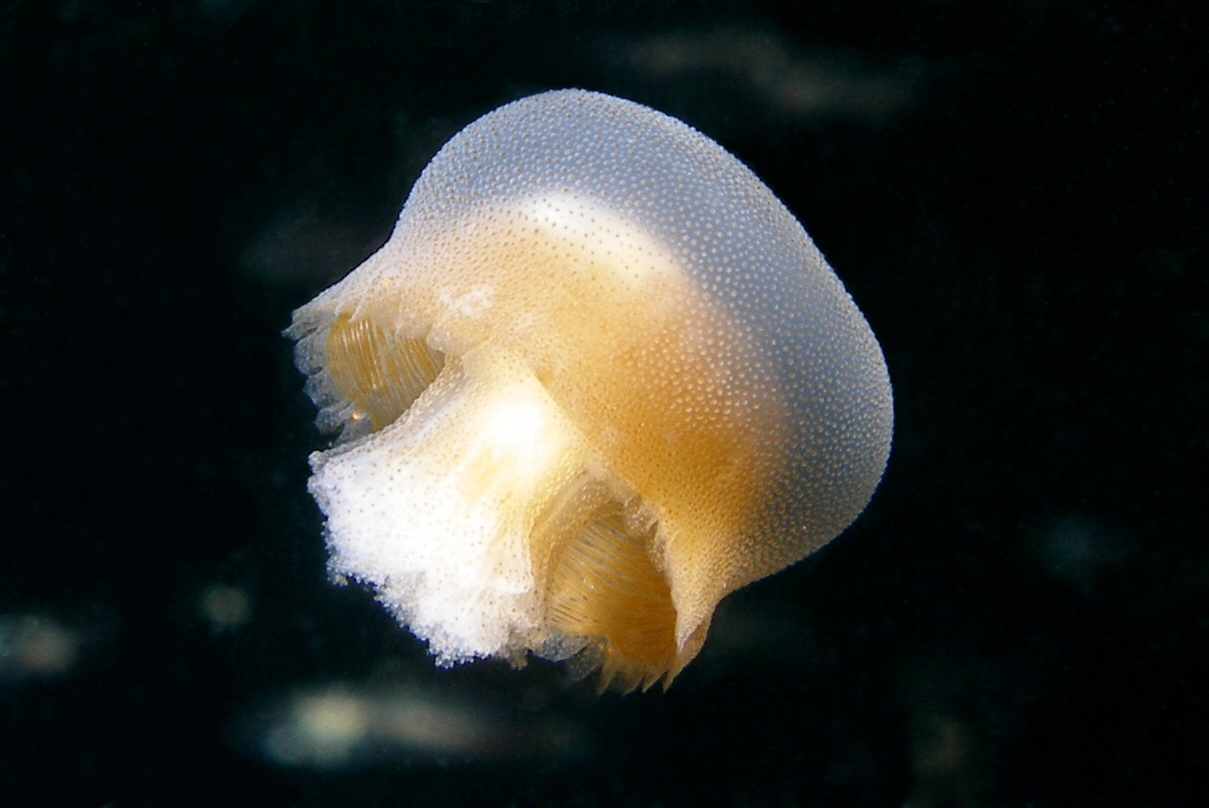

Scientific classification
- Kingdom: Animalia
- Phylum: Cnidaria
- Class: Scyphozoa
- Order: Rhizostomeae
- Suborder: Ptychophorae
- Family: Bazingidae; Gershwin, L. & Davie, P.J.F. 2013
- Genus: Bazinga; Gershwin, L. & Davie, P.J.F. 2013
- Species: B. rieki

Binomial name
- Bazinga rieki Gershwin, L. & Davie, P.J.F. 2013

= Bazinga rieki =

Genus of jellyfishes

Bazinga is a genus of rhizostome jellyfish with only one known species, Bazinga rieki, found off the central eastern coast of Australia.

== Description ==
Bazinga rieki could not be placed in any known family or suborder of rhizostome jellyfish, so a new family Bazingidae was erected; it represents a new suborder of Rhizostomeae, called Ptychophorae. Bazinga rieki has a thick round translucent and colourless body, the aboral (upper) surface of which is covered in tiny warts with yellow centres.

The subumbrellar muscle folds are golden brown, their colour derived from zooxanthellae. With a diameter of less than 2 centimetres (0.79 in), around the size of a grape, it is much smaller than any other rhizostome. It has a large circular stomach that takes up over half the jellyfish's body and is visible from underneath. It has a hooded rhopalia rather than open pits, unlike any other rhizostome.

== Taxonomy and naming ==
Marine biologists Lisa-Ann Gershwin and Peter Davie described the jellyfish in June 2013, from the holotype, which was collected in shallow water in the Brunswick River in northern New South Wales at high tide. The specific epithet refers to Denis Riek, who photographed a specimen in northern New South Wales, leading to the discovery.

The genus name, Bazinga, has two cultural references: firstly, as a colloquialism meaning "fooled you!" uttered by Dr. Sheldon Cooper in the television program The Big Bang Theory, as the small size means the species was probably mistaken as a juvenile of other species, such as the similar Catostylus mosaicus; the term bazinga is also given to a seven-string harp, and the straight radial canals of this new species are reminiscent of such strings.

== See also ==
- Euglossa bazinga, an endangered bee species of Brazil
