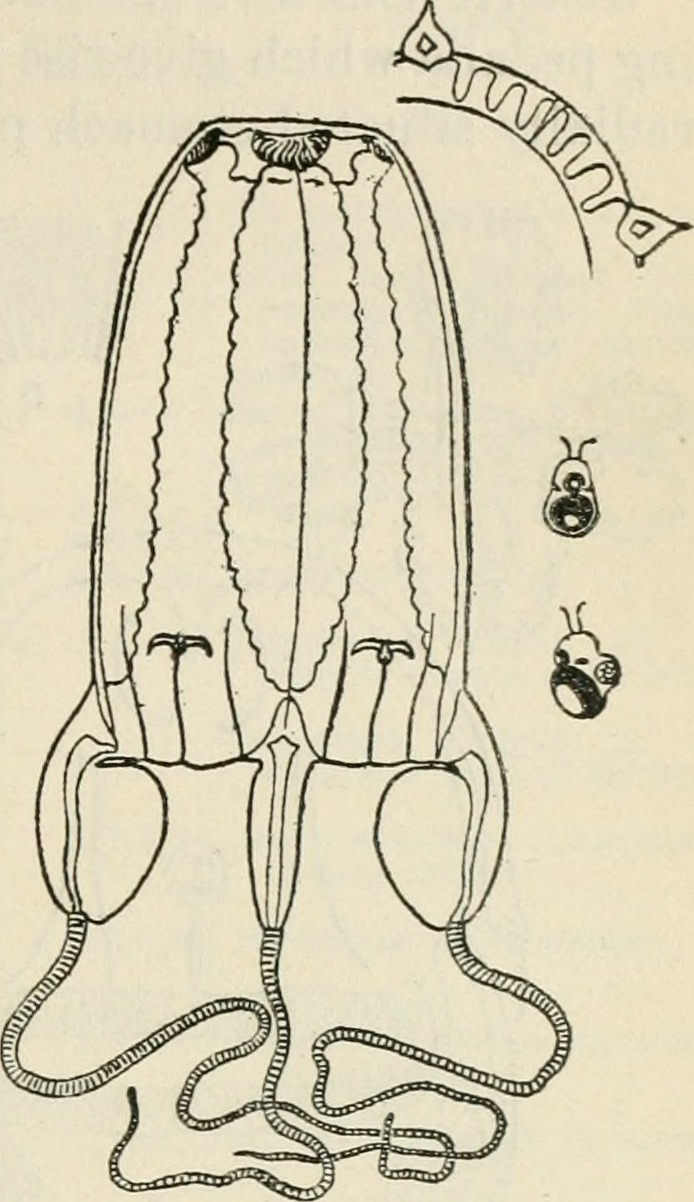

Scientific classification
- Kingdom: Animalia
- Phylum: Cnidaria
- Class: Cubozoa
- Order: Carybdeida
- Family: Alatinidae
- Genus: Alatina
- Species: A. grandis

Binomial name
- Alatina grandis (Agassiz & Mayer, 1902)

Synonyms
- Charybdea grandis Agassiz & Mayer, 1902

= Alatina grandis =

Species of jellyfish

Alatina grandis is the largest known species in the genus Alatina, with specimens reaching up to 230 mm in bell height. The species was described from material collected near Fakarava and Anaa Island in the Tuamotu Archipelago.

Alatina grandis is a species of box jellyfish in the genus Alatina. It has been found in the Pacific Ocean off the coasts of islands in French Polynesia. A rare sighting in the Gulf of Aqaba was reported in 2026.
