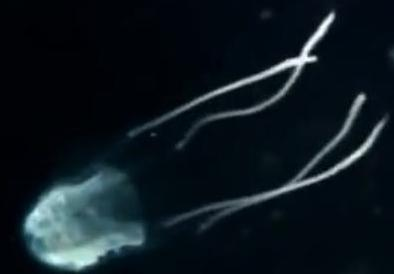
- A box jellyfish which is looks like Carukia barnesi or Malo kingi or another box jellyfish species

Scientific classification
- Kingdom: Animalia
- Phylum: Cnidaria
- Class: Cubozoa
- Order: Carybdeida
- Family: Carukiidae
- Genus: Carukia; Southcott, 1967

Species
- See text

= Carukia =

Genus of jellyfishes

Carukia is a genus of box jellyfish in the Carukiidae family.

== Species ==
The World Register of Marine Species lists the following two species:

- Carukia barnesi Southcott, 1967
- Carukia shinju Gershwin, 2005
