= Alatina moseri =

Scientific classification
- Kingdom: Animalia
- Phylum: Cnidaria
- Class: Cubozoa
- Order: Carybdeida
- Family: Alatinidae
- Genus: Alatina
- Species: A. moseri

Binomial name
- Alatina moseri (Mayer, 1906)

Species of jellyfish

Alatina moseri is a species of tropical box jellyfish in the class Cubozoa, known for its complex life cycle and advanced sensory structures and behaviors. Initially described as Carybdea moseri in 1830, the species was reclassified under the genus Alatina in 2005 following taxonomic revisions. It inhabits tropical Pacific waters, particularly near Hawaii and northern Australia, and is most abundant near shorelines during specific lunar phases. Research on this species remains limited due to challenges in filed sampling, laboratory cultivation, and broader gaps in understanding of Cubozoan biology.

== Taxonomy ==
Alatina moseri belongs to phylum Cnidaria and class Cubozoa, commonly known as box jellyfish. Cubozoans currently include 45 described species, divided into two orders: Carybdeida and Chriodropida. While there are only 45 know species in the class, it is likely that there are species yet to be described by scientists. Members of Carybdeida, including A. moseri, are characterized by the presence of four tentacles, whereas Chirodropids have multiples of 4. The tentacles are attached to the pedalium, a muscular pad at the four corners of the square bell. The genus Alatina comprises 11 described species, with A. moseri originally being described under the genus Carybdea before its reclassification.

== Anatomy and morphology ==
The medusa (free-swimming) stage of Alatina moseri, is relatively large. Individual organisms collected in Hawaii had an avergage bell height of 64 mm, whereas Australian specimens were larger, reaching an average bell height of 72 mm. The bell is taller than it is wide, forming a rectangular shape with a flat apex. A notable morphological feature of the species is the balloon-shaped hypostome with four lips, a structure not previously observed in other cubozoans.

=== Rhopalia ===
Cubozoans, including A. moseri, possess highly developed sensory systems compared to other cnidarians. One unique feature is their rhopalia, which serve as sensory and neural processing centers. Alatina moseri has four rhopalia located at the margin of the bell, each containing six eyes, including two camera-type eyes capable of forming images.These structures enable vision and are thought to play a direct role in controlling swimming behavior by processing visual information.

=== Statolith ===
Statoliths are balance organs fount in the classes Scyphozoa and Cubozoa. In A. moseri, they are located within the rhopalia and are used to orient the organism within the water column. These are the only hard structure in the jellyfish's body and are a useful tool in distinguishing between families and species of cubozoans. The statolith of Alatina moseri have a jellybean-like shape and are a light amber in color.

=== Venom ===
The sting of Alatina moseri is initially mild, with pain typically fading within 30 minutes. However, in some cases, it may cause painful, itchy rashes that persist for several months. The species is among cubozoans known to cause Irukandji syndrome, a potentially serious condition characterized by symptoms like intense low back pain, muscle cramping, nausea, high blood pressure, sweating, and extreme discomfort. Both the Australian and Hawaiian populations of A. moseri have been linked to causing Irukandji syndrome.

== Life cycle ==
Alatina moseri undergoes a complete metamorphosis from polyp to medusa, in which the entire polyp turns into a single medusa with four tentacles. Following fertilization, the egg develops into a blastulae within 24 hours. Within 1-2 days, it forms a planula larva with eye spots, which settles onto a substrate after 2-3 days. The resulting polyps can grow up to approximately 1.70 mm in height before transforming into a medusa during metamorphosis.

== Distribution and habitat ==
This species is distributed throughout tropical waters of the Pacific Ocean, particularly around the Hawaiian Islands and the Osprey Reef in northern Australia. Although typically inhabiting mesopelagic zones, A. moseri aggregates nearshore several days after a full moon. At locations like Waikīkī Beach, jellyfish consistently appear 8 to 12 days following the full moon, suggesting lunar synchronization of reproductive activity.

=== Population response to environmental changes ===
Additionally, population fluctuations may be tied to environmental changes. Alatina moseri is a carnivorous species that preys on zooplankton in the water column. Its population density is influenced by environmental factors, particularly food availability. Years with increased jellyfish abundance have coincided with elevated zooplankton biomass and positive indices of the North Pacific Gyre Oscillation. These environmental patterns affect phytoplankton productivity, which in turn impacts zooplankton populations and ultimately the availability of food for A. moseri.

== Bibliography ==
Bentlage, B., Cartwright, P., Yanagihara, A. A., Lewis, C., Richards, G. S., & Collins, A. G. (2010). Evolution of box jellyfish (Cnidaria: Cubozoa), a group of highly toxic invertebrates. Proceedings of the Royal Society B: Biological Sciences, 277(1680), 493–501. https://doi.org/10.1098/rspb.2009.1707

Bentlage, B., & Lewis, C. (2012). An illustrated key and synopsis of the families and genera of carybdeid box jellyfishes (Cnidaria: Cubozoa: Carybdeida), with emphasis on the "Irukandji family" (Carukiidae). Journal of Natural History, 46(41–42), 2595–2620. https://doi.org/10.1080/00222933.2012.717645

Carrette, T. J. (2014). Etiology of Irukandji Syndrome with particular focus on the venom ecology and life history of one medically significant carybdeid box jellyfish Alatina moseri [James Cook University]. https://doi.org/10.25903/CR6M-S533

Carrette, T., Straehler-Pohl, I., & Seymour, J. (2014). Early Life History of Alatina cf. moseri Populations from Australia and Hawaii with Implications for Taxonomy (Cubozoa: Carybdeida, Alatinidae). PLoS ONE, 9(1), e84377. https://doi.org/10.1371/journal.pone.0084377

Chiaverano, L. M., Holland, B. S., Crow, G. L., Blair, L., & Yanagihara, A. A. (2013). Long-Term Fluctuations in Circalunar Beach Aggregations of the Box Jellyfish Alatina moseri in Hawaii, with Links to Environmental Variability. PLoS ONE, 8(10), e77039. https://doi.org/10.1371/journal.pone.0077039

Crow, G. L., Chiaverano, L. M., Crites, J., Khramov, M. A., & Holland, B. S. (2014). Box Jellyfish (Cubozoa: Carybdeida) in Hawaiian Waters, and the First Record of Tripedalia cystophora in Hawai`i. Bishop Museum (Occasional Papers).https://www.researchgate.net/publication/267868544_Box_Jellyfish_Cubozoa_Carybdeida_in_Hawaiian_Waters_and_the_First_Record_of_Tripedalia_cystophora_in_Hawaii

Garm, A., Ekström, P., Boudes, M., & Nilsson, D.-E. (2006). Rhopalia are integrated parts of the central nervous system in box jellyfish. Cell and Tissue Research, 325(2), 333–343. https://doi.org/10.1007/s00441-005-0134-8

Gershwin, L. (2005). Taxonomy and phylogeny of Australian cubozoa [Phd, James Cook University]. https://researchonline.jcu.edu.au/27395/

Gurska, D., & Garm, A. (2014). Cell Proliferation in Cubozoan Jellyfish Tripedalia cystophora and Alatina moseri. PLoS ONE, 9(7), e102628. https://doi.org/10.1371/journal.pone.0102628

Mooney, C. J., & Kingsford, M. J. (2016). Statolith Morphometrics Can Discriminate among Taxa of Cubozoan Jellyfishes. PLOS ONE, 11(5), e0155719. https://doi.org/10.1371/journal.pone.0155719

Tibballs, J., Li, R., Tibballs, H. A., Gershwin, L.-A., & Winkel, K. D. (2012). Australian carybdeid jellyfish causing "Irukandji syndrome." Toxicon, 59(6), 617–625. https://doi.org/10.1016/j.toxicon.2012.01.006

Alatina Gershwin 2005. Encyclopedia of Life. Retrieved April 13, 2025, from https://eol.org/pages/23361

Biology, Biological Diversity, Invertebrates, Phylum Cnidaria. OER Commons. Retrieved April 12, 2025, from https://oercommons.org/courseware/lesson/15078/student/?section=4

WoRMS - World Register of Marine Species—Alatina moseri (Mayer, 1906). Retrieved April 2, 2025, from https://www.marinespecies.org/aphia.php?p=taxdetails&id=289382
