= Keesingia =

Scientific classification
- Kingdom: Animalia
- Phylum: Cnidaria
- Class: Cubozoa
- Order: Carybdeida
- Family: Alatinidae
- Genus: Keesingia; Gershwin, 2014
- Species: K. gigas

Binomial name
- Keesingia gigas Gershwin, 2014

Genus of jellyfishes

Keesingia gigas, the "giant" (Greek gigas) Keesingia, is one of two new species of Irukandji jellyfish, the only one of the genus Keesingia in the Alatinid family.

Found off the north-west coast of Western Australia, the species is able to deliver an extremely deadly sting which can cause the victim to experience Irukandji syndrome which can cause pain, nausea, vomiting and in some rare instances stroke or heart failure.

About the length of a person's arm, the species is unique among Irukandji jellyfish, which are usually the size of a fingernail. Moreover, none of the specimens found so far have tentacles. It was named after the marine biologist John Keesing, who captured one near Shark Bay in 2013. This and another new species bring the total number of jellyfish known to cause Irukandji syndrome worldwide up to 16, four of them coming from Western Australia.
