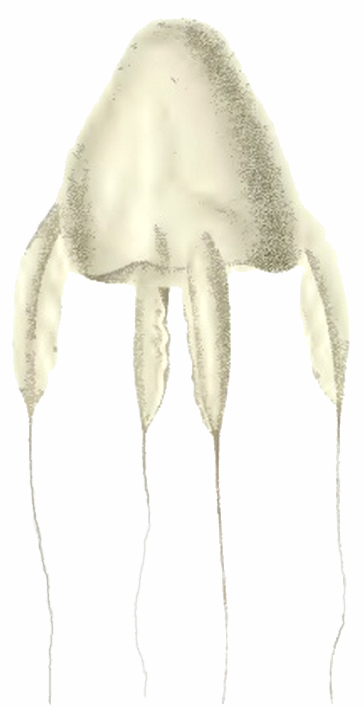
- Alatina alata

Scientific classification
- Kingdom: Animalia
- Phylum: Cnidaria
- Class: Cubozoa
- Order: Carybdeida
- Family: Alatinidae
- Genus: Alatina; Gershwin, 2005

Species
- 8 species, see elsewhere in the article

= Alatina =

Genus of jellyfishes

Video of Alatina swimming at depth, taken near the Bahamas.

Alatina is a genus of box jellyfish within class Cubozoa. It is the largest of the three known genera in the family Alatinidae, and the only one which is not monotypic. It contains the following ten species:

- Alatina alata (Reunaud, 1830)
- Alatina grandis (Agassiz & Mayer, 1902)

Alatina Grandis is the largest known jellyfish in this genus, and is highly rare with a bell size of approximately 180mm and 110mm in height and width respectively.

- Alatina madraspatana (Menon, 1930)
- Alatina morandinii (Straehler-Pohl & Jarms, 2011)
- Alatina moseri (Mayer, 1906)
- Alatina pyramis (Haeckel, 1880)
- Alatina rainensis (Gershwin, 2005)
- Alatina tetraptera (Haeckel, 1880)

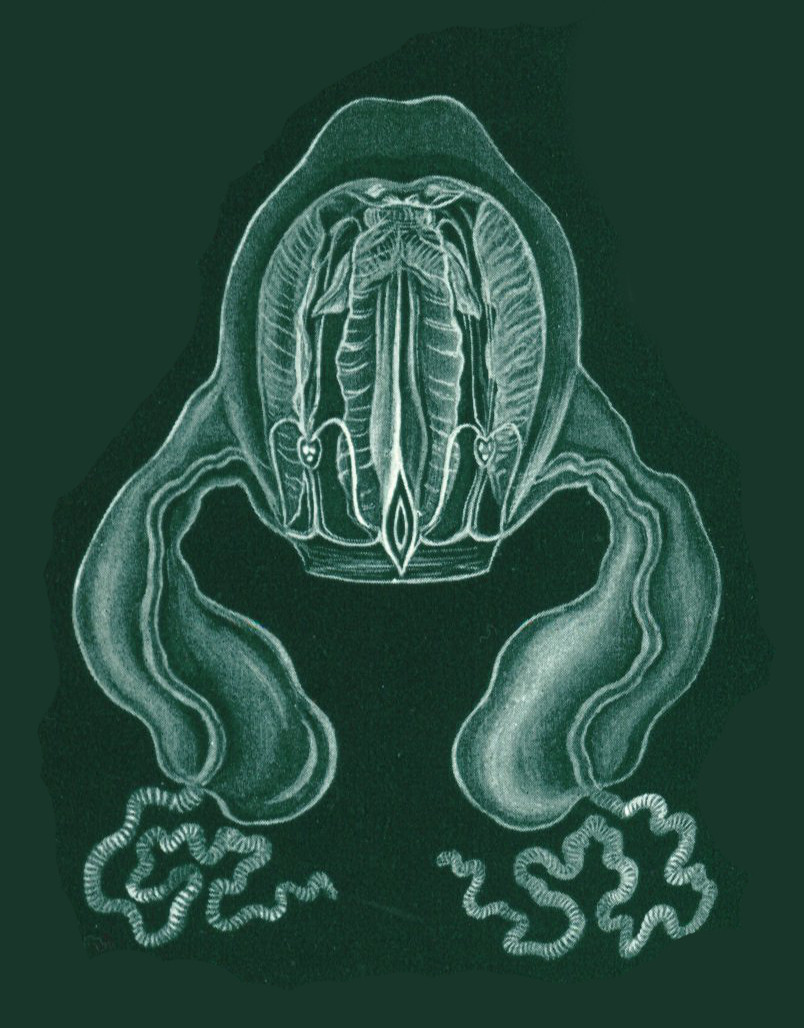
Alatina tetraptera
