= Juli Berwald =

Ocean scientist and science writer

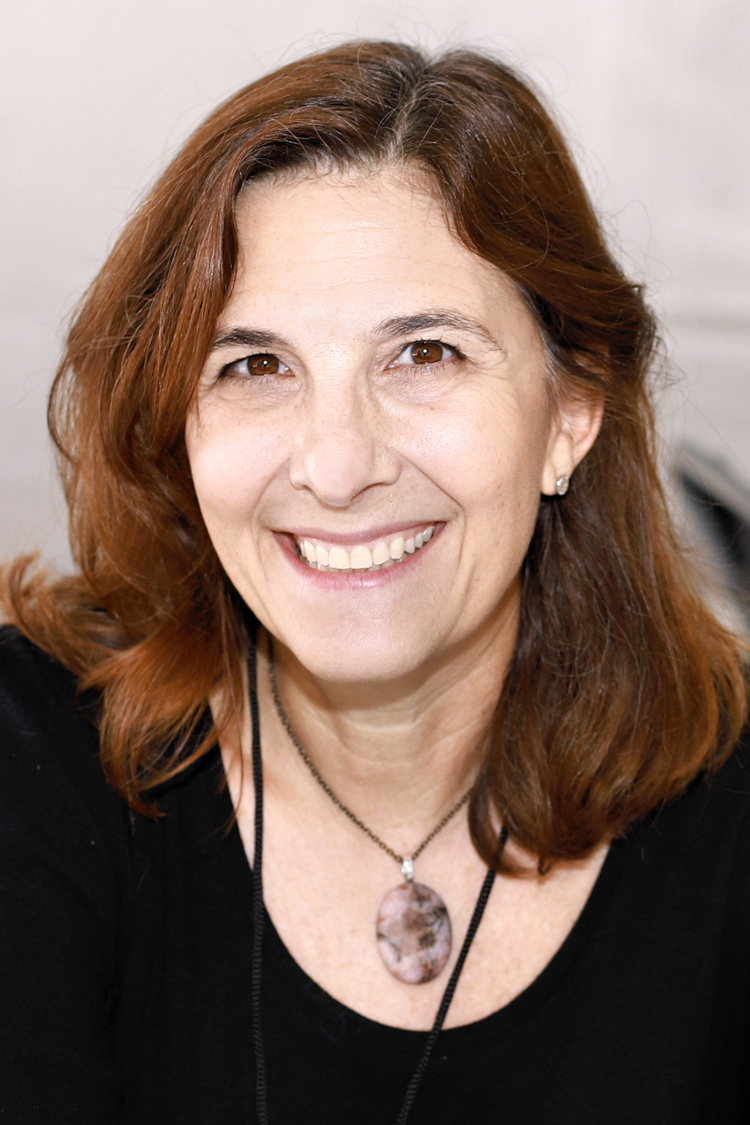
- Berwald at the 2022 Texas Book Festival
- Education: University of Southern California (PhD)
- Occupations: Ocean scientist, science writer

Juli Berwald is an ocean scientist and science writer based in Austin, Texas. She is the author of a science memoir and two science textbooks, and her magazine-length pieces have appeared in The New York Times and National Geographic, among other publications. She graduated from the University of Southern California with a Ph.D. in ocean science in 1998.

== Publications ==
=== Books ===
Berwald is the author of the science textbooks Focus on Earth Science California, Grade 6, and Focus on Life Science California, Grade 7, published by Glencoe/McGraw-Hill in 2007.

Her science memoir, Spineless: The Science of Jellyfish and the Art of Growing a Backbone, was published by Riverhead in 2017. It was reviewed by librarian Elissa Cooper for Library Journal, librarian Nancy Bent for Booklist, bookseller Hank Stephenson for Shelf Awareness, Leslie Nemo and Andrea Gawrylewski for Scientific American, jellyfish expert Lisa-ann Gershwin for Nature, Maura M. Lynch and Jinnie Lee for W magazine, and Erika Engelhaupt for Science News. Publishers Weekly included it among "The Most Anticipated Books of Fall 2017". In addition, the book was briefly mentioned by Alex Crowley for Publishers Weekly's Fall 2017 Adult Announcements, by Jennifer Ridgway for Brightly, by Eliza Thompson for Cosmopolitan, by Jane Ciabattari for BBC Culture's Between the Lines, and by Chelsea Stuart for Jetsetter.

An excerpt from Spineless was featured in a 2017 issue of Discover magazine.

Berwald and Spineless were a major influence for artist Marina Zurkow's conceptual climate change-themed project, Making the Best of It.

Berwald wrote about the publishing process and her book's difficulty of not fitting neatly into the science or memoir genres for the National Association of Science Writers.

In April 2022, her book Life on the Rocks: Building a Future for Coral Reefs was published by Riverhead Books. The book combines memoir and science to study the coral reefs and the scientists, researchers, philanthropists, and filmmakers who are working to preserve their existence.

=== Articles ===
==== Popular science ====
In 2009, Berwald reported for Wired on the creation-evolution debate in Texas and its impact on the state's science education standards. This debate was further explored in her role as a school science textbook author in the 2012 documentary film The Revisionaries. Also in 2009, Berwald wrote for Oceanus magazine about the sedation of whales entangled in fishing lines, the key threats to emperor penguins, and yellow-band disease in coral reefs. She also wrote an article for Oceanus that same year about seafloor vents as an iron-rich nutrient source for organisms.

In 2010, Berwald wrote for the University of Southern California on the value of editing.

In 2011, Berwald wrote for Inside Science about conservation efforts around the Columbia Basin pygmy rabbit.

In 2014, Berwald wrote for HuffPost about the methods of searching for life on Mars.

Also that year, Berwald contributed a New York Times op-ed about the expansion of the Suez Canal, which was proceeding without environmental reviews. Her concerns focused on the heightened opportunities that the expansion presented to invasive species like Rhopilema nomadica, with implications for the Mediterranean Sea.

In 2015, Berwald contributed to a Nature News in focus article about the Nicaraguan Grand Canal project. She noted its similarity to the Suez Canal expansion, in lacking environmental reviews. She followed with a HuffPost blog entry in August 2015 about the progression of the issue and the increasing numbers of concerned scientists.

Also in 2015, Berwald wrote for HuffPost about the possibility of carbon capture and sequestration for the Keystone-XL Pipeline project. In February 2016, Berwald disputed Benroy Chan's column in The Daily Texan about carbon capture and storage.

In March 2016, Berwald wrote about the regenerative abilities of the moon jellyfish Aurelia for National Geographic. In May 2016, in another National Geographic article, she interviewed Rachel Buchholz about her book Amazing Moms: Love and Lessons from the Animal Kingdom.

In August 2016, she wrote about sea anemone research's impact on repairing hearing loss.

In September 2016, Berwald co-wrote a Slate article with Elizabeth Devitt about Austin's focus on the word "weird".

In December 2016, Berwald wrote for Hakai magazine on the uncertainty around and limited oversight of jellyfish harvesting and fisheries.

==== Academic ====
Berwald cowrote the following article while a doctoral student at the University of Southern California:

- Iturriaga, Rodolfo H.; Berwald, Juli; Sonek, Gregory J. (1997-02-06). Ackleson, Steven G.; Frouin, Robert J. (eds.). "New technique for the determination of spectral reflectance of individual and bulk particulate suspended matter in natural water samples". Ocean Optics XIII. SPIE / International Society for Optics and Photonics. 2963: 455–460. doi:10.1117/12.266483.

=== Interviews ===
Berwald was interviewed in a 1999 article about the automation of sampling equipment and data in oceanography and marine biology.

In 2013, Berwald was featured in Episode 11 of Texas Business Women's Women. Connected. podcast about "Building relationships and rapport over Skype".

Berwald interviewed author Stuart Rojstaczer in October 2014 about his book The Mathematician's Shiva.

In November 2017, Berwald was interviewed about Spineless by Laura Rice for the Texas Standard.

== Personal life ==
In 2007, Berwald wrote for Redbook about how motherhood had changed her perspective on life, but that her 10 years as a marine biologist aided in other situations.

In May 2014 on Medium, she wrote about her grandmother's impact on her life and her death in April that year.

== Bibliography ==
- Spineless: The Science of Jellyfish and the Art of Growing a Backbone, Riverhead Books, 2017. ISBN 9780735211261 LCCN 2017-5838
- Life on the Rocks: Building a Future for Coral Reefs, Penguin Random House, 2022. ISBN 9780593087305 LCCN 2021-26535
