= Jamie Seymour =

Australian biologist

- Known for: Studying venom biology, especially that of the box jellyfish. He has also appeared in the book The Thing About Jellyfish
- Scientific career
- Fields: Venom biology
- Institutions: James Cook University

Jamie Seymour is an Australian toxinologist. He has been a lecturer and researcher at James Cook University since 1996 and gained Professorship in 2019. Professor Seymour started his academic career as a lecturer in the School of Tropical Biology at James Cook University. He is currently a member of the Australian Institute of Tropical Health & Medicine. His research involves examining the biology and ecology of dangerous species found in Australia.

In 1998, Professor Seymour established and became director of the Tropical Australian Venom Research Unit which studies the ecology, biology and medical treatment of venomous marine creatures, particularly box jellyfish.

He has been involved in programs designed to decrease the envenoming of humans by box jellyfish in Australia, East Timor and Hawaii. Professor Seymour's work has also been involved with changes in the treatment protocol for jellyfish stings in Australia.

Professor Seymour attributes his interest in marine biology primarily to his father, who as a young boy scout was involved in a canoeing accident that led to the drownings of everyone involved except him and his friend. As a result, his children were taught to swim at a very early age. Professor Seymour, who lived on the Clarence River in Grafton, New South Wales, spend much of his early life swimming, diving and sailing. Because his whole childhood revolved around the water, Professor Seymour considered it preordained that he would end up with his subsequent career.

== Appearances on television ==
Seymour has appeared in a number of television documentaries as an expert on venomous creatures, particularly marine stingers. They include:

- A 1999 documentary titled World's Deadliest Creature by filmmaker Ben Cropp.
- An Explorer episode called "Jellyfish Invasion" on the National Geographic Channel.
- Killer Jellyfish on the Discovery Channel. In his career, Jamie was stung an incredible 11 times by the deadly Irukandji jellyfish and on each occasion, was hospitalised in intense pain. One of these incidents was documented here. Unlike some victims, he suffered for only about fifty hours.
- Ocean's Deadliest, in which he collaborated with wildlife presenter Steve Irwin, who was tragically killed by a stingray barb during its making.
- MonsterQuest episode titled "Killer Jellyfish Invasion" on History.
- 72 Dangerous Animals: Australia episode titled "Risky Waters" on National Geographic.
- Aussie Strike Force, which follows his venom studies in and around Cairns, Australia. It is currently shown on the Nat Geo Wild channel.

In addition, he has collaborated with Destin Sandlin in multiple videos of Smarter Every Day, and also hosts the educational YouTube channel The Nature of Science.

Seymour also made an appearance in the novel The Thing About Jellyfish by Ali Benjamin.
