= Malo filipina =

Scientific classification
- Kingdom: Animalia
- Phylum: Cnidaria
- Class: Cubozoa
- Order: Carybdeida
- Family: Carukiidae
- Genus: Malo
- Species: M. filipina

Binomial name
- Malo filipina Bentlage & Lewis, 2012

Species of jellyfish

Malo filipina is a small and venomous Irukandji jellyfish found in the Philippines. It was first described to science in 2012, and is one of four species in genus Malo, often confused in the past with the M. maxima.

== Description ==
Malo filipina is a small Carybdeida, measuring between 30 and 40 mm. Its bell is white/transparent and covered by equally spaced nematocysts.
