= Manokia =

Scientific classification
- Kingdom: Animalia
- Phylum: Cnidaria
- Class: Cubozoa
- Order: Carybdeida
- Family: Alatinidae
- Genus: Manokia; Southcott, 1967
- Species: M. stiasnyi

Binomial name
- Manokia stiasnyi (Bigelow, 1938)

Genus of jellyfishes

Manokia is a genus of box jellyfish in the Alatinidae family.

== Species ==
The World Register of Marine Species lists the following species:

- Manokia stiasnyi (Bigelow, 1938)
