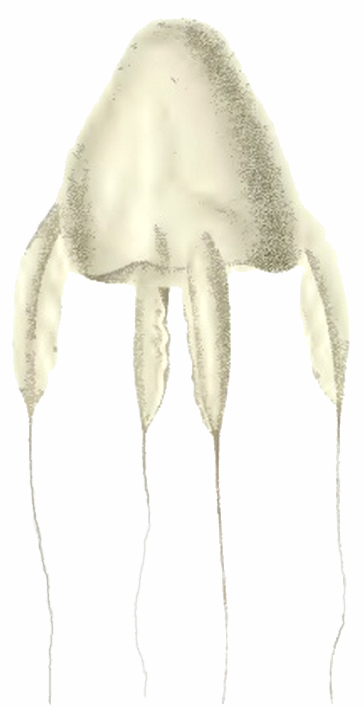
- Alatina alata

Scientific classification
- Kingdom: Animalia
- Phylum: Cnidaria
- Class: Cubozoa
- Order: Carybdeida
- Family: Alatinidae; Gershwin, 2005

Genera
- Alatina; Manokia; Keesingia

= Alatinidae =

Family of jellyfishes

Alatinidae is a family of box jellyfish within class Cubozoa, containing the following genera and species:

- Alatina
  - Alatina alata (Reunaud, 1830)
  - Alatina grandis (Agassiz & Mayer, 1902)
  - Alatina madraspatana (Menon, 1930)
  - Alatina mordens Gershwin, 2005 [synonym of A. moseri]
  - Alatina moseri (Mayer, 1906)
  - Alatina obeliscus (Haeckel, 1880)
  - Alatina philippina (Haeckel, 1880)
  - Alatina pyramis (Haeckel, 1880)
  - Alatina rainensis Gershwin, 2005
  - Alatina tetraptera (Haeckel, 1880)
  - Alatina turricola (Haeckel, 1880)
- Manokia
  - Manokia stiasnyi (Bigelow, 1938)
- Keesingia
  - Keesingia gigas (Gershwin, 2014)
