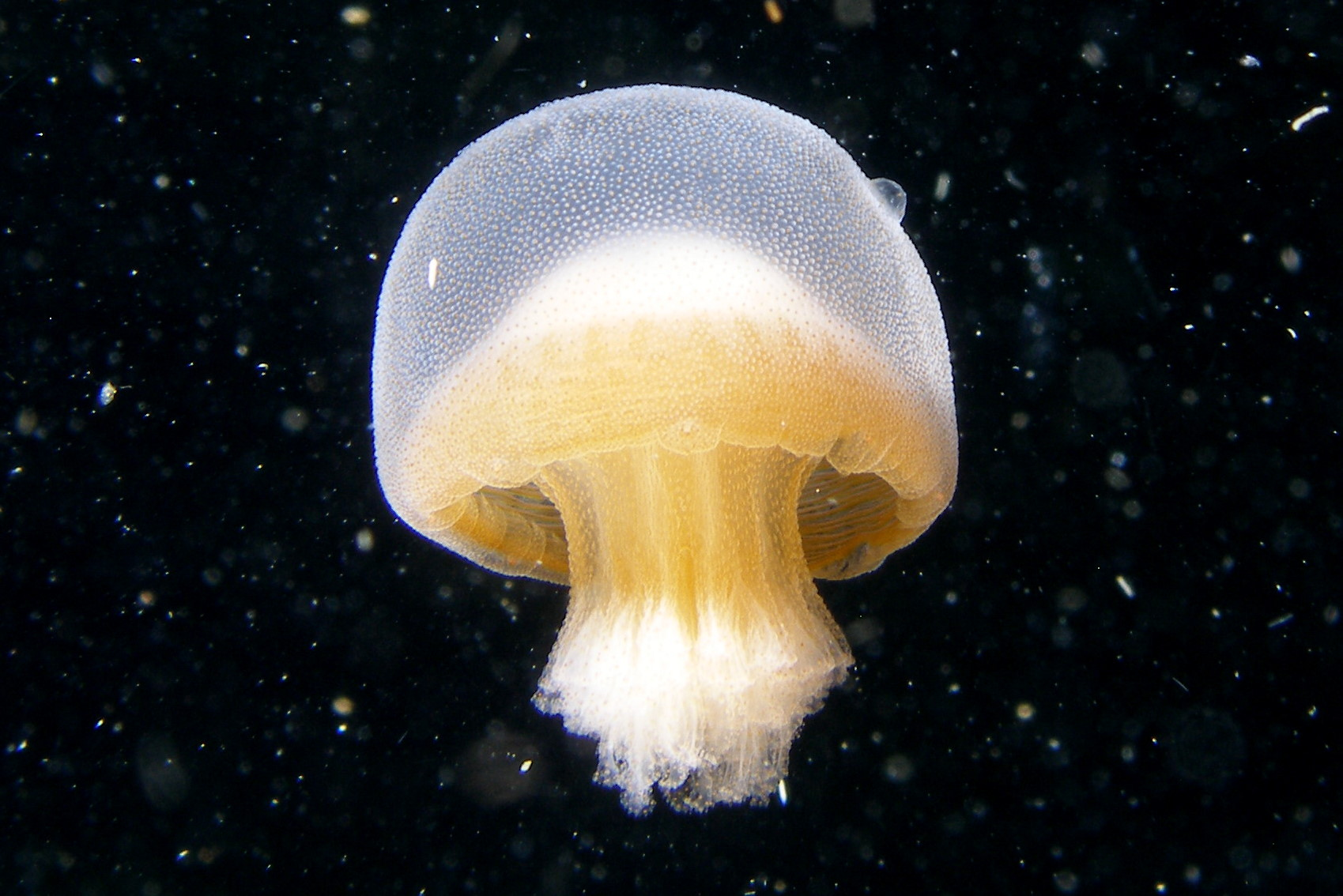
- Bazinga rieki

Scientific classification
- Kingdom: Animalia
- Phylum: Cnidaria
- Class: Scyphozoa
- Order: Rhizostomeae
- Suborder: Ptychophorae; Gershwin & Davie, 2013

= Ptychophorae =

Suborder of jellyfishes

Ptychophorae is a suborder of rhizostome jellyfish, identified in 2013 by Gershwin and Davie.

The word Ptychophorae is said to be derived from the Greek ptychos (fold, leaf, layer) and phoras (bearing), in reference to the hooded rhopalia. The proper word for 'fold' in ancient Greek is however ptyx (πτύξ).

== Distinctive features ==
Ptychophorae are distinguished by the following features:

- The body is globular.
- The oral arms coalesce into a single short, ridged column, without scapulets.
- The rhopalia is hooded, lacking typical pits.
- There are 4 velar lappets per octant.
- There 2 asymmetrical ocular lappets per octant.
- The annular muscles are conspicuous.
- The subgenital ostia are very small and round.
- The stomach is circular and large.
- There are 4 radial canals per octant, proximally unbranched, and fluted, and peripherally coalesced into vast open sinus with patchwork of jelly matrix.

== Taxonomy ==
- Family Bazingidae
  - Genus Bazinga

The single identified member of this suborder is the Bazinga rieki.
