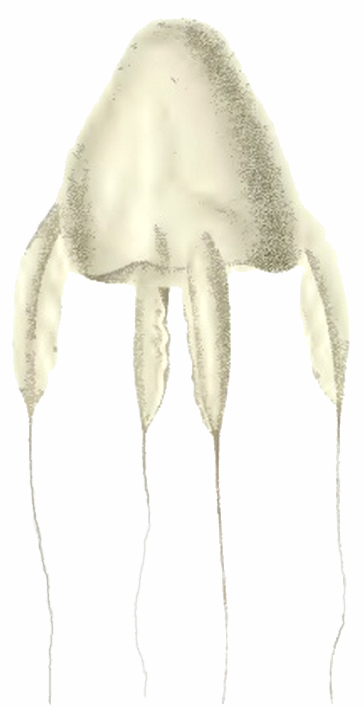

Scientific classification
- Kingdom: Animalia
- Phylum: Cnidaria
- Class: Cubozoa
- Order: Carybdeida
- Family: Alatinidae
- Genus: Alatina
- Species: A. alata

Binomial name
- Alatina alata (Reynaud, 1830)

Synonyms
- Carybdea alata (Reynaud, 1830)

= Alatina alata =

Species of jellyfish

Alatina alata (Reynaud, 1830), often called a sea wasp, is a species of box jellyfish found in the Pacific, Indian and Atlantic Oceans and in the Caribbean and Arabian Sea.

== Ecology ==
Alatina alata is mostly observed in shallow near shore waters in tropical and subtropical climate, but also occurs offshore in deeper ocean waters. Live medusae collected had hyperiidae amphipods in their subumbrella and some had small carid shrimps and euphausiids in the gut or subumbrella. Previously called Alatina mordens (Australia) or Alatina moseri (Hawaii). These are considered to be the same species, hence the rename.

== Description ==
Alatina alata is a transparent box jellyfish with an pyramidal with rounded tip umbrella, smooth exumbrella and thin and transparent mesoglea. The manubrium is short, square, with four simple lips, and without mesenteries joining manubrium walls to subumbrellar stomach walls. Four crescentic gastric phacellae (gastric filaments used for digestion) at interradial corners of stomach, disposed horizontally. Three simple to palmate branching velarial canals per octant, each with a velarial lappet bearing a row of 3 to 4 nematocyst warts; Gonads are conspicuous, extending from the base of stomach to nervous ring. Nervous ring connecting rhopalia, where it connects with the sense organ, and bases of pedalia. Four long perradial rhopalia on umbrella. Rhopalar niches composed of two small infero-lateral projections and one superior projection. Four long wing-like pedalia, each with a pink tentacle with bands of nematocysts along the entire length. Pedalial canal with a superior projection (diverticulum). Four perradial frenulae connectíng velarium and subumbrella. Cnidome: heterotrichous microbasic p-euryteles and small birhaploids in tentacles, and large isorhizasin nematocyst warts.

== Distribution ==
Alatina alata ranges across the Pacific and Atlantic and possibly the Indian Ocean. It is also found in the Arabian Sea along the beaches of Pakistan.

== Toxicity ==
The rash and pain caused by Alatina alata (Carybdea alata) stings are self- limited, usually disappearing with no treatment from 20 minutes to one day. A few victims suffer generalized reactions, persistent pain and/or recurring, itching rash. No confirmed deaths have occurred from this box jellyfish's stings, but the pain they inflict can be severe.

== Taxonomy ==
The so-called winged box jellyfish was originally described in 1830 as Carybdea alata (Reynaud, 1830) in La Centurie Zoologique — a monograph published by René Primevère Lesson during the age of worldwide scientific exploration. Reynaud's brief description gave no details about the collection events or the whereabouts of the specimen, stating only that this box jellyfish "lives in the Atlantic Ocean". Carybdea alata is the second oldest name for a box jellyfish, and the name has been applied to specimens reported in oceans worldwide (e.g. Pacific, Indian and Atlantic). In the last decade the species underwent a nomenclatural change being reassigned to the new genus Alatina, but in the absence of a type specimen, i.e., a voucher specimen that represents the originally described species, it has been difficult to confirm which reports actually correspond to the species now known as Alatina alata.
