= Ali Benjamin =

American author

- Born: Alison Wade; United States
- Other name: Ali Wade Benjamin
- Education: Grinnell College
- Occupation: Author
- Years active: 2011–present
- Relatives: John Orr Young, Cynthia Wade
- Website: alibenjamin.com

Ali Benjamin is an American author living in Williamstown, Massachusetts.

== Books ==
Benjamin is known for her debut novel The Thing About Jellyfish, which was a National Book Award for Young People's Literature finalist in 2015, and a New York Times Best Seller. The Thing about Jellyfish is the story of a girl named Suzy who becomes convinced that her friend's accidental drowning was the result of a rare jellyfish sting and not just a random tragedy. The story follows Suzy as she decided to stop speaking in the wake of the loss and as she does whatever it takes to prove her theory correct. In the end, she ultimately accepts her friends death and learns how to be happy without her friend.

The book has been optioned for film by Reese Witherspoon's production company Pacific Standard.

The novel has received attention as a book that could encourage girls to consider careers in STEM (Science, Technology, Engineering and Mathematics) fields. Benjamin has expressed in interviews that the scientific aspects of the novel were born out of a failed attempt to write a non-fiction book about jellyfish for adults.

The Thing about Jellyfish has received reviews from Kirkus Reviews, Publishers Weekly, Booklist, School Library Journal, and Shelf Awareness. The book was named by the New York Times as one of twenty-five notable children's books of 2015.

Benjamin is the co-author of Tim Howard's The Keeper: The Unguarded Story of Tim Howard (2014), and Paige Rawl's Positive: A Memoir (2014), which is a coming-of-age memoir that was a Junior Library Guild selection and the first-ever nonfiction selection for The Today Show book club. The Keeper was a New York Times Best Seller in sports. Benjamin has additionally authored The Cleaner Plate Club (2010) with Beth Bader, which is a guide for parents to help them feed their kids a healthy diet.

Benjamin's first adult novel, The Smash-Up, was released February 23, 2021 by Random House. It is a retelling of the 1911 Edith Wharton novella Ethan Frome, and set in the heated political climate of 2018. She said about her intentions for the book, "I wanted readers to step squarely into the space that exists between people's lived experiences, and from that space glimpse — even just briefly, even if only as a flicker — what could be, if we can finally start to close that gap."

== Books ==
- The Smash-Up, Ali Benjamin, Random House, 2021 ISBN 978-0593229651
- The Next Great Paulie Fink, Ali Benjamin, Little Brown Books for Young Readers, 2019 ISBN 978-0316380881
- The Thing About Jellyfish, Ali Benjamin, Little Brown Books for Young Readers, 2015 ISBN 978-0316380867
- The Keeper: The Unguarded Story of Tim Howard (Adult and Younger Readers' Editions), Tim Howard and Ali Benjamin, HarperCollins, 2014 ISBN 978-0062387585
- Positive: A Memoir, Paige Rawl and Ali Benjamin, HarperCollins, 2014 ISBN 978-0062342515
- The Cleaner Plate Club, Ali Benjamin and Beth Bader, Storey Publishing, 2011 ISBN 978-1603425858

== Personal life ==
She was born Alison "Ali" Wade. She is a graduate of Grinnell College in Grinnell, IA.
