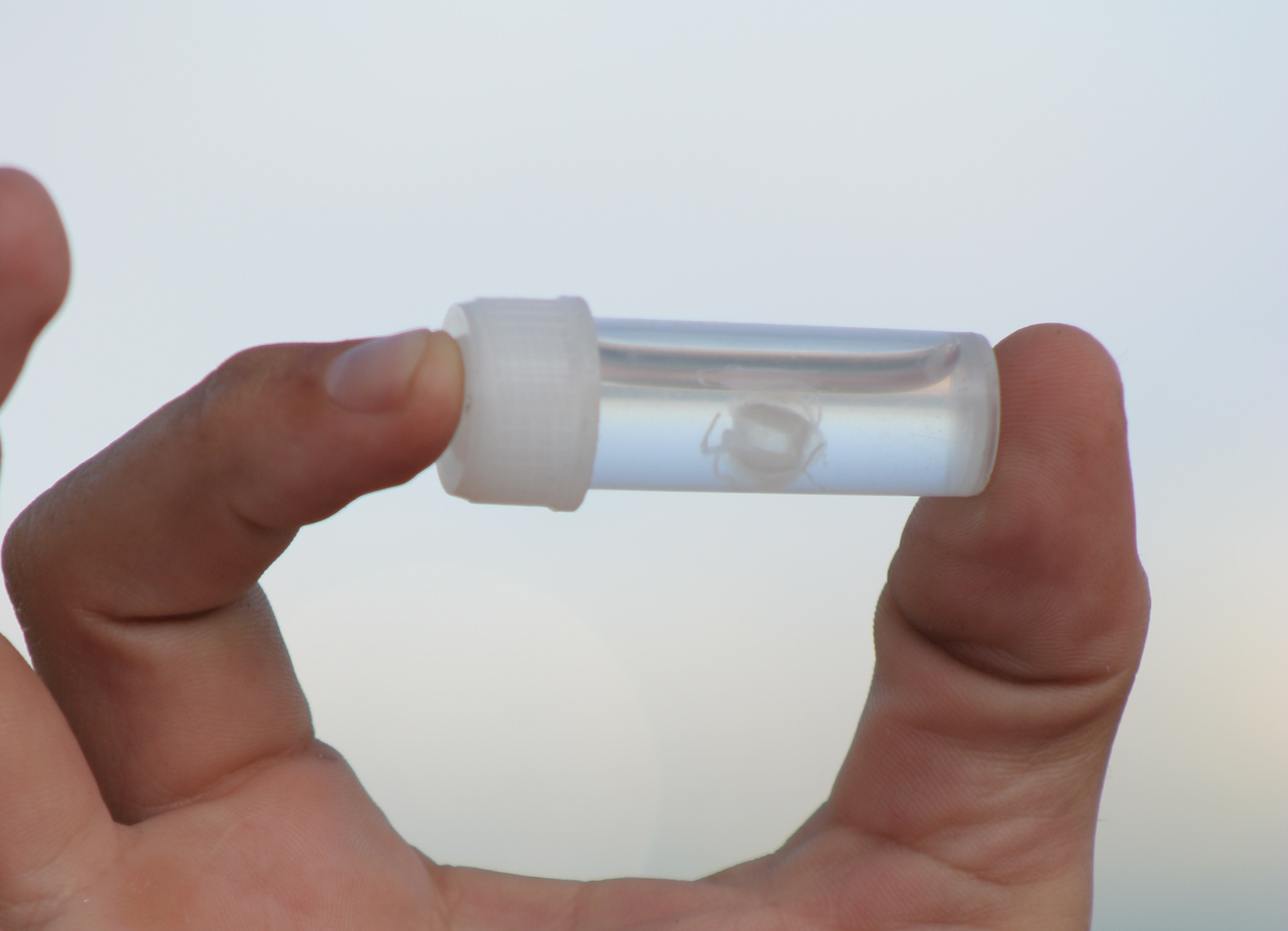

Scientific classification
- Kingdom: Animalia
- Phylum: Cnidaria
- Class: Cubozoa
- Order: Carybdeida
- Family: Carukiidae
- Genus: Malo
- Species: M. kingi

Binomial name
- Malo kingi Gershwin, 2007

= Malo kingi =

Species of jellyfish

Malo kingi, the common kingslayer, is a species of Irukandji jellyfish. It was first described to science in 2007, and is one of four species in the genus Malo. It has one of the world's most potent venoms, even though it is no bigger than a human thumbnail. As an Irukandji, it can cause Irukandji syndrome, characterized by severe pain, vomiting, and rapid rise in blood pressure.

It is named after victim Robert King, a tourist from the United States swimming off Port Douglas, Queensland, who died from its sting.

== Anatomy and appearance ==
Malo kingi is one of the Irukandji jellyfish. They are sometimes halo banded, meaning they have halo-like rings encircling their tentacles. They are bell-shaped with light purple nematocyst warts. The bell is transparent, colourless and has a height of 31 mm. They also have a frown-shaped rhopaliar niche ostium, perradial lappets that have two rows of warts, palmate velarial canals, and two median lensed eyes. Their primary tentacular cnidae are club shaped. The rhopaliar horns are short, broad, and curved.

== Range ==
Malo kingi are local to Queensland, Australia. A very small number of M. kingi are found during the year in late summer and early winter. Non-halo form M. kingi are found more often than the ones with a halo form.

== Toxicity ==
Malo kingi are small and inconspicuous, but extremely venomous. This makes it hard for potential victims to see them before they are stung. The death of Robert King is the only proof of their venom being deadly. There have been other incidents of them stinging people. Lisa-Ann Gershwin, an Australian marine stinger advisor, was stung while studying M. kingi. She was stung on both hands, which blistered badly. A week later several layers of her skin peeled off. According to Gershwin, a young girl was also stung and experienced nausea, excruciating pain, high blood pressure, and discomfort. Since there have been different outcomes for people that have been stung, scientists believe that as a M. kingi matures its venom becomes stronger. They also believe that the non-halo forms may be less venomous.

== Death of Robert King ==
In 2002, U.S. tourist Robert King went to Queensland, Australia. While snorkeling, he was stung by a M. kingi. King died due to jellyfish sting-induced hypertension and intracranial hemorrhage. His death brought awareness of M. kingi and led to more research being done on them. The species was named in his memory.
