= Lisa-ann Gershwin =

Australian biologist

- Born: Los Angeles, California, U.S.
- Citizenship: Australian
- Education: California State University, Northridge (BSc, 1997); University of California, Berkeley (PhD, 2003)
- Scientific career
- Fields: Cnidariology
- Workplaces: CSIRO

Lisa-ann Gershwin, also known as Lisa Gershwin, is an American-Australian biologist based in Launceston, Tasmania, who has described over 200 species of jellyfish, and written and co-authored several non-fiction books about Cnidaria (jellyfish and allies) including Stung! (2013) and Jellyfish – A Natural History (2016). She provides independent advice related to jellyfish worldwide to the media, online and via The Jellyfish App. She was an unsuccessful candidate in the 2021 Tasmanian state election running as an independent in the electorate of Clark.

== Education ==
Born in Los Angeles, California, Gershwin began studying jellyfish in 1992.

In 1993, she received an Associate of Arts degree in biology from Los Angeles Pierce College.

In 1997, Gershwin was awarded a Bachelor of Science in Marine Biology from California State University Northridge.

She was a Fulbright Fellow in 1998–1999.

Gershwin earned a Ph.D. in Integrative Biology from the University of California Berkeley in 2003 and completed a second Ph.D. in Marine Biology at James Cook University in 2005.

== Career ==
Gershwin has worked with and for a range of scientific organisations, including CSIRO from circa 2012 to early 2019.

She developed a system to predict blooms of the hazardous Irukandji jellyfish in north Queensland. She led a team that discovered that the blooms coincide with the blooming of salps, and that these were prompted by upwelling after the dying down of trade winds. In December 2017 Gershwin's team refined a model for the early warning forecasting systems for irukandjis, with water testing off Cairns' northern beaches.

She has described several venomous jellyfish—nine species of irukandji, including the Queensland species Malo kingi and Malo maxima, and the giant irukandji species Keesingia gigas from Western Australia, which was discovered without tentacles.

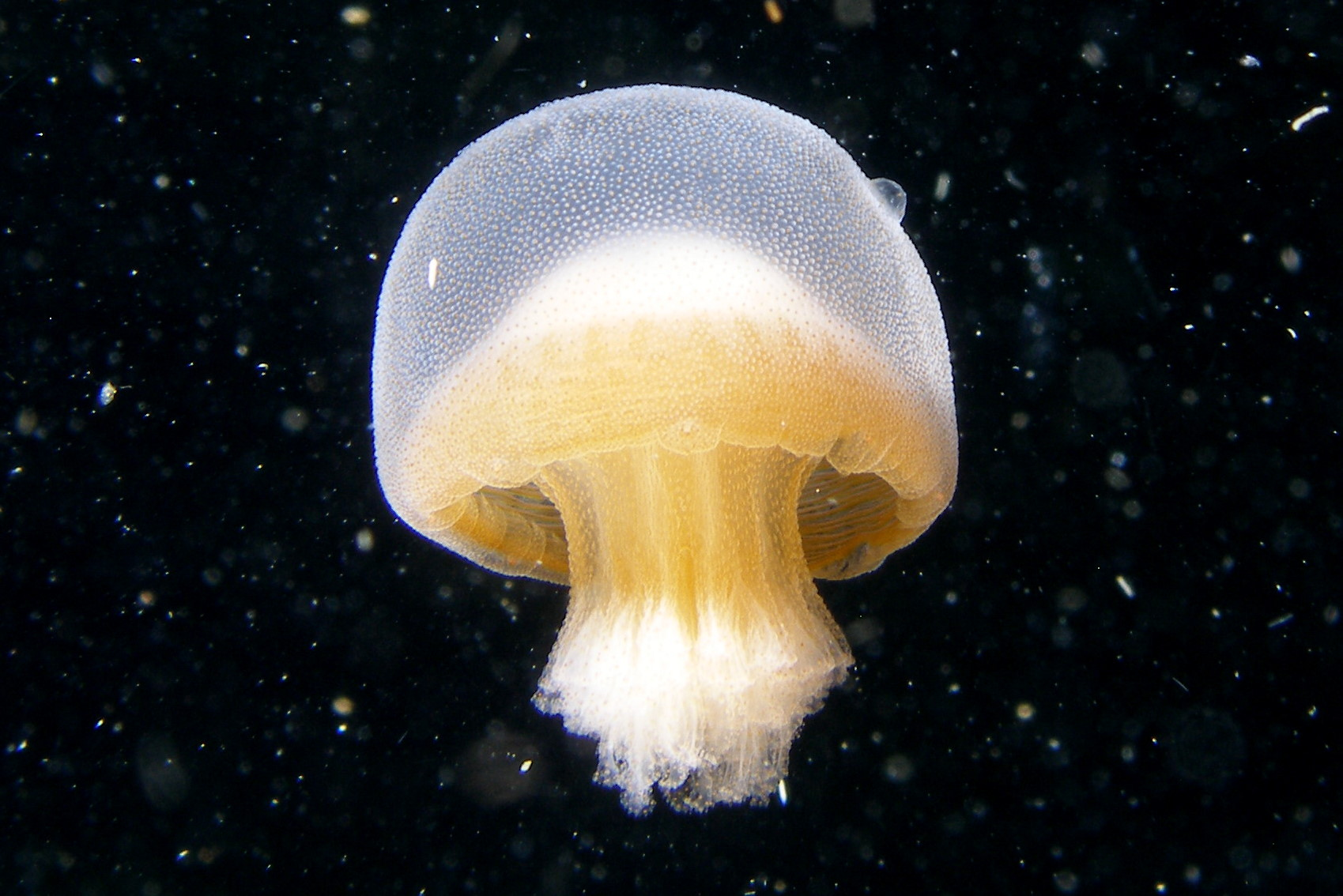
Bazinga rieki, described and photographed by Geshwin

Gershwin was one of the co-describers of the unusual jellyfish Bazinga rieki, which is the sole member of the new family Bazingidae and partly named for the colloquialism uttered by Dr. Sheldon Cooper in the TV program The Big Bang Theory. In early 2014, a giant "snotty" jellyfish some 1.5m in diameter was discovered at a beach in Howden, south of Hobart. Studied by Gershwin currently, it is due to be described in a future paper. In 2015, Gershwin was preparing to name three undescribed species with input from visitors to the celebrations for CSIRO's new research vessel.

Gershwin was named one of the Top 100 Australian Scientists by the Science Show in 2024.

== Publications ==
=== Books ===
Gershwin's 2013 book entitled Stung describes the diversity and adaptability of jellyfish, and their increasing numbers at the expense of other organisms worldwide, through over-fishing, pollution and modification of the marine environment. She concedes there is little that can be done to reverse or even halt the process of the marine environment becoming dominated by jellyfish worldwide.

In 2016, Gershwin's 224 page book Jellyfish – a natural history was published by The Ivy Press. It covers jellyfish anatomy, life history, taxonomy and ecology and includes species level information and many full page photographs.

In 2023, Gershwin's book, Shapeshifters: The Wondrous World of Jellyfish, was published by Abrams.

=== Articles ===
Gershwin wrote for The Conversation in December 2015 about blue bottles, and in January 2016, about deadly sea creatures.

In November 2017, Gershwin completed an invited book review for Nature, spanning Juli Berwald's Spineless: the science of jellyfish and the art of growing a backbone, and Danna Staaf's Squid empire: the rise and fall of the cephalopods.

=== Profiles and news interviews ===
==== Profiles ====
In February 2014, Gershwin was interviewed by Bec Crew for Scientific American.

In June 2014, Gershwin was highlighted as a valuable expert in Anne Mather's article on funding cuts for CSIRO's Hobart office. In January 2019, ABC reported that Gershwin's role at CSIRO would finish in February as her contract was not being renewed, but that she would continue her jellyfish research through her private consultancy.

In May 2017, Gershwin was interviewed by Richard Fidler for ABC Radio.

==== News interviews ====
In February 2017, Gershwin commented on a jellyfish bloom at Deception Bay, as being the biggest she had seen in her 25 years of research. In January 2018, she was interviewed about an unusual wave of bluebottles in Cairns. In January 2018, the Atlantic cited her 2007 Radio National interview on the symptoms of being stung by irukandji, Malo kingi.

== Personal life ==
Gershwin is related to composer George Gershwin. She was diagnosed with Asperger syndrome in 2010.
