= Irukandji jellyfish =

Various species of extremely small box jellyfish

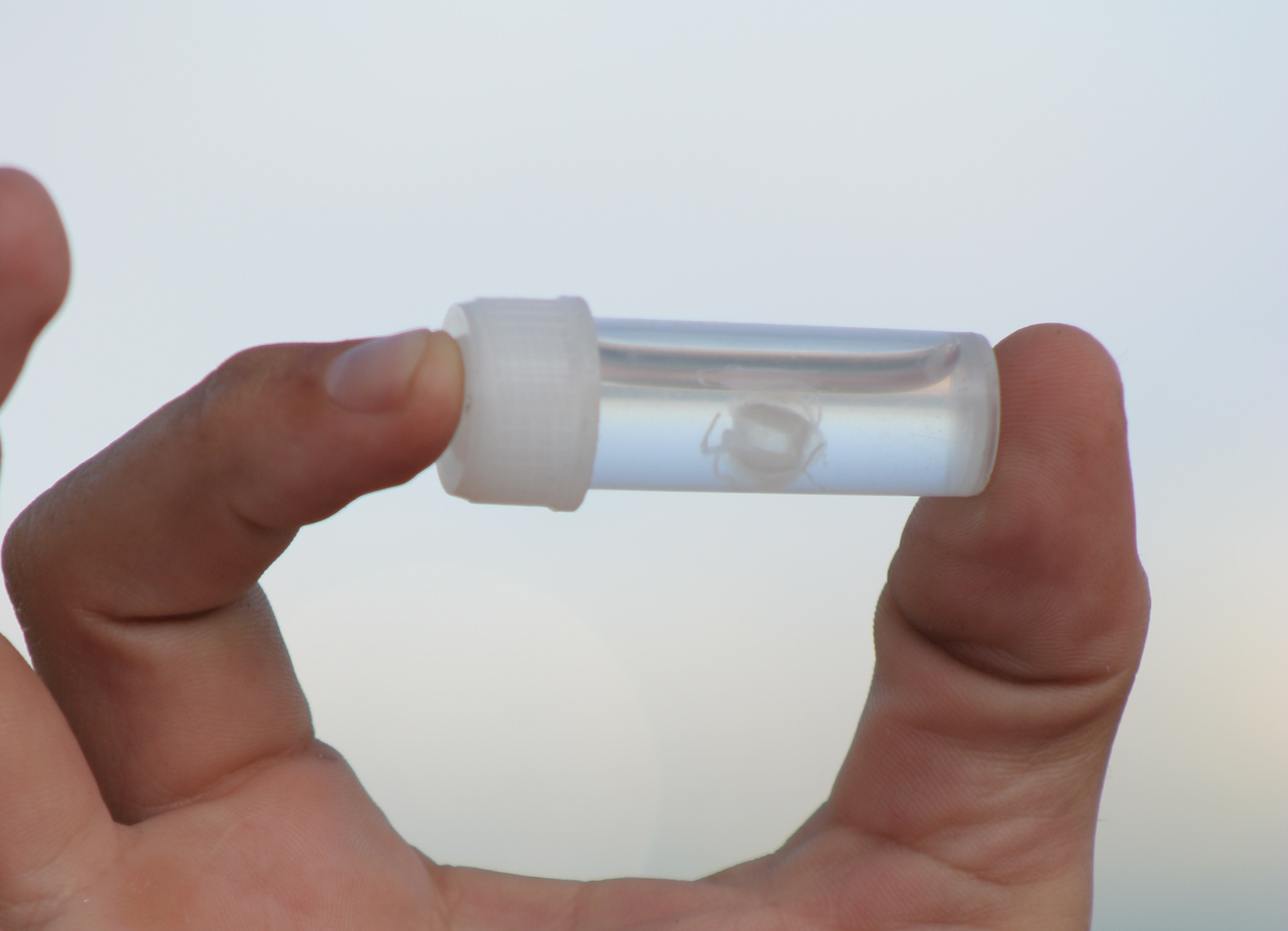
Malo kingi in a clear plastic vial

The Irukandji jellyfish (/ˌɪrəˈkændʒi/ IRR-ə-KAN-jee) are any of several similar, extremely venomous species of rare box jellyfish. With a very small adult size of about a cubic centimetre (1 cm^{3} or 0.061 in^{3}), they are both one of the smallest and one of the most venomous jellyfish in the world. They inhabit the northern marine waters of Australia, and cost governments, predominantly those in north-eastern Australia, $AUD 3 million annually through tourism losses and medical costs associated with stings.

This type of jellyfish reproduces sexually with eggs and sperm. They fire their stingers into their victim, causing a condition known in humans as Irukandji syndrome, which can be fatal and difficult to immediately recognise due to the delayed effects of the venom. There are about 16 known species of Irukandji, of which Carukia barnesi, Malo kingi, Malo maxima, Malo filipina and Malo bella are the best known.

Irukandji syndrome was named in 1952 by Hugo Flecker, who first described the symptoms of envenomation by this jellyfish. The syndrome was named after the Irukandji people, whose region stretches along the coastal strip north of Cairns, Queensland. The first of these jellyfish, Carukia barnesi, was identified in 1964 by Jack Barnes; to prove it was the cause of Irukandji syndrome, he captured the tiny jellyfish and allowed it to sting him, his nine-year-old son, and a robust young lifeguard. They all became seriously ill, but survived. Australian toxicologist Jamie Seymour made a documentary about the jellyfish called Killer Jellyfish.

In 2015, North Queensland researchers discovered evidence that Irukandji jellyfish actively hunt prey.

== Range ==
The Irukandji jellyfish exists in the northern waters of Australia. The southern extent of the Irukandji's range on Australia's eastern coast has been gradually moving south reaching K'gari, and on the west coast reaching Ningaloo Reef.

There has been an increased incidence of Irukandji stings reported around Great Palm Island, off the coast of north Queensland near Townsville. By early December 2020, the number of stings reported, at 23, was nearly double that of the whole of 2019, at 12.

== Biology ==
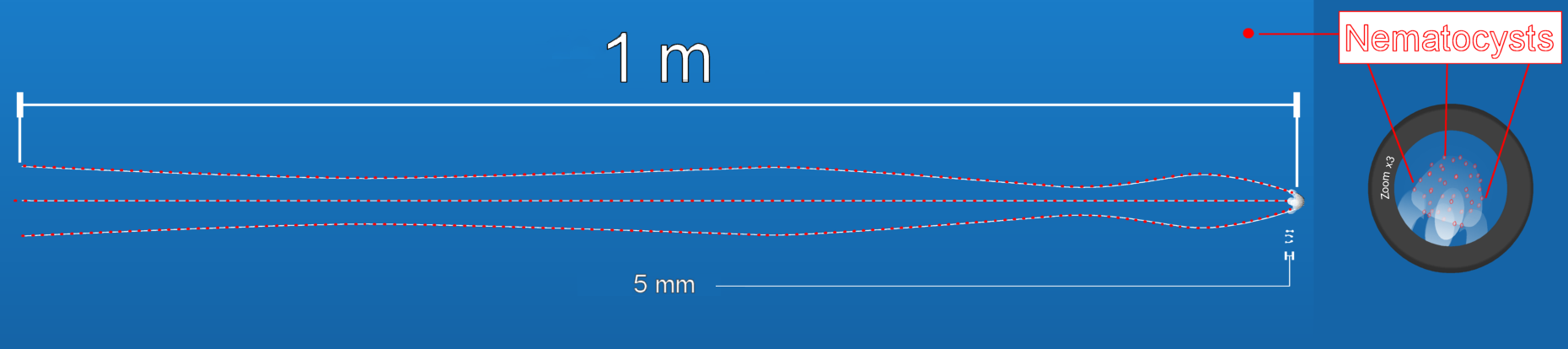
A scale illustration of an Irukandji jellyfish and its tentacles. Below the jelly's medusa bell are two polyp forms of the species.

Irukandji jellyfish are very small, with a bell about 5 millimetres (0.20 in) to 25 millimetres (0.98 in) wide and four long tentacles, which range in length from just a few centimetres up to 1 metre (3.3 ft) in length.

Malo maxima mature irukandji typically have halo-like rings of tissue around their four tentacles. Apparently, it is the mature Irukandji that are highly venomous (in all species). Apparent Malo maxima juveniles have been identified without the halo-rings, and without gonads, and have demonstrated far weaker toxicity in stinging researchers. The stingers (nematocysts) are in clumps, appearing as rings of small red dots around the bell and along the tentacles.

The Irukandji's small size and transparent body make it very difficult to see in the water.

Very little is known about the life cycle and venom of Irukandji jellyfish. This is partly because they are very small and fragile, requiring special handling and containment. Their venom is very powerful. They are blamed for killing 5 tourists during a 3-month period in Australia; all of the five victims displayed two typical features of Irukandji syndrome: delayed onset (5–40 min to illness and 2–12 h to death) and highly visible distress (vomiting, difficulty breathing, extreme pain, etc.). Researchers conjecture that the venom possesses such potency to enable it to quickly stun its prey, which consists of small and fast fish. Judging from statistics, it is believed that the Irukandji syndrome may be produced by several species of jellyfish, but only Carukia barnesi and Malo kingi have so far been proven to cause the condition.

== Sting ==
Unlike most jellyfish, which have stingers only on their tentacles, the Irukandji also has stingers on its bell. Biologists have yet to discover the function of this unique characteristic. The hypothesis is that the feature helps the jellyfish catch its prey of small fish.

Irukandji jellyfish have the ability to fire stingers from the tips of their tentacles and inject venom.

Irukandji jellyfish's stings are so severe they can cause fatal brain hemorrhages and on average send 50–100 people to the hospital annually.

Robert Drewe describes the sting as "100 times as potent as that of a cobra and 1,000 times stronger than a tarantula's".

Between 1 January and early December 2020, 23 stings, seven of which required admission to hospital for Irukandji syndrome, were sustained in the waters around Palm Island, off northern Queensland.

== Irukandji syndrome ==
Irukandji syndrome is produced by a small amount of venom and induces excruciating muscle cramps in the arms and legs, severe pain in the back and kidneys, a burning sensation of the skin and face, headaches, nausea, restlessness, sweating, vomiting, and an increase in heart rate and blood pressure. These effects are caused by release of catecholamines. The venom also contains a sodium channel modulator.

The sting is moderately irritating; the severe syndrome is delayed for 5–120 minutes (30 minutes on average). The symptoms last from hours to weeks, and victims usually require hospitalisation. Contrary to popular belief, researchers from James Cook University and Cairns hospital in far north Queensland have found that vinegar promotes the discharge of jellyfish venom. Treatment consists of following the Danger Response Airway Breathing Circulation sequence outlined by Australian Resuscitation Council (ARC) (2005) guidelines, followed by immediate transport to hospital. First aid suggested in the guidelines includes pouring household vinegar on the tentacles and affected area to stop unfired nematocysts from firing – and notes this has no neutralising effects on the venom. Despite further research controversially claiming that under certain conditions vinegar exacerbates the potency of venom from fired nematocysts, The Australian Resuscitation Council continues to recommend using vinegar.

Treatment is symptomatic, with antihistamines and anti-hypertensive drugs used to control inflammation and hypertension; intravenous opioids, such as morphine, hydromorphone and fentanyl, are used to control the pain. Magnesium sulfate has been used to reduce pain and hypertension in Irukandji syndrome, although it has had little to no effect in some cases.

Irukandji jellyfish are usually found near the coast, attracted by the warmer water, but blooms have been seen as far as five kilometres offshore. When properly treated, a single sting is normally not fatal, but two people in Australia are confirmed to have died from Irukandji stings in 2002 during a rash of incidents on Australia's northern coast attributed to these jellyfish. It is unknown how many other deaths from Irukandji syndrome have been wrongly attributed to other causes like heart attacks and drownings. It is also unknown which jellyfish species can cause Irukandji syndrome apart from Carukia barnesi and Malo kingi.
