= Irukandji syndrome =

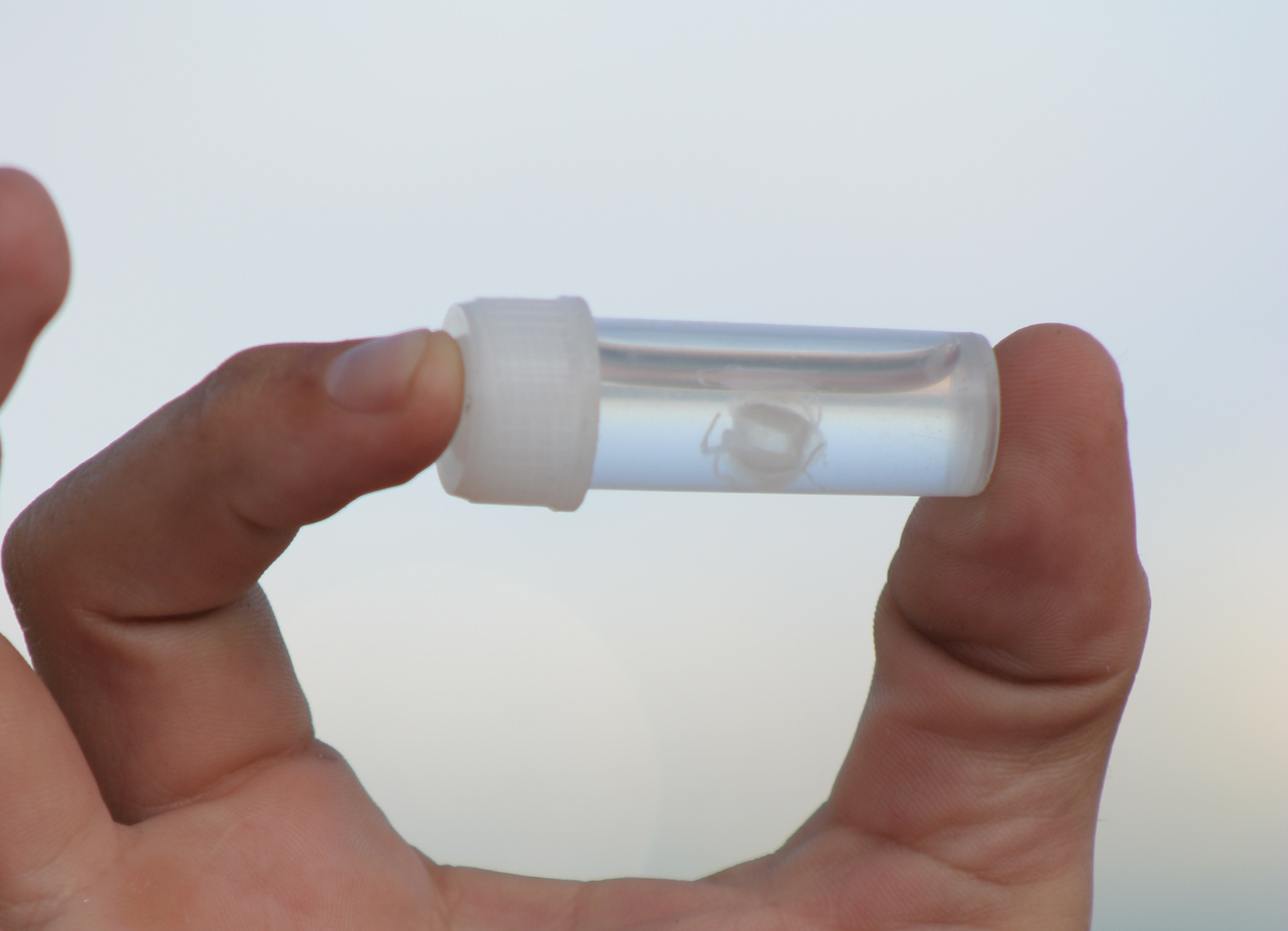
- A specimen of Malo kingi, a species of Irukandji jellyfish, in a clear plastic vial
- Specialty: Medical toxicology
- Symptoms: Headache, backache, chest and abdominal pain, nausea, vomiting, excessive sweating, severe and sudden onset anxiety, tachycardia
- Complications: Hypertension, enlarged heart, pulmonary edema, cardiac arrest, possible heart failure
- Usual onset: 30 minutes after exposure
- Duration: 4–30 hours, sometimes up to 2 weeks
- Causes: Irukandji jellyfish sting

Irukandji syndrome is a condition that results from envenomation by certain box jellyfish. In rare instances the sting may result in cardiac arrest and death. The most common jellyfish involved is the Carukia barnesi, a species of Irukandji jellyfish. Those stung may experience severe or even excruciating pain.

The syndrome was given its name in 1952 by Hugo Flecker, after the Aboriginal Irukandji people who live in Palm Cove, north of Cairns, Queensland, Australia, where stings are common.

== Signs and symptoms ==
Most stings occur during the summer wet season in October–May in North Queensland, with different seasonal patterns elsewhere. Because the jellyfish are very small, the venom is only injected through the tips of the nematocysts (the cnidocysts) rather than the entire lengths; as a result the sting may barely be noticed at first. It has been described as feeling like little more than a mosquito bite. The symptoms, however, gradually become apparent and then more and more intense in the subsequent 5 to 120 minutes (30 minutes on average). Irukandji syndrome includes an array of systemic symptoms, including severe headache, backache, muscle pains, chest and abdominal pain, nausea and vomiting, sweating, anxiety, hypertension, tachycardia, and pulmonary edema. Symptoms generally improve in four to 30 hours, but may take up to two weeks to resolve completely.

=== Toxicity ===
When properly treated, a single sting is almost never fatal; however, two people in Australia are believed to have died from Irukandji stings, which has greatly increased public awareness of Irukandji syndrome. It is unknown how many other deaths from Irukandji syndrome have been wrongly attributed to other causes.

== Pathophysiology ==
The exact mechanism of action of the venom is unknown, but catecholamine excess may be an underlying mechanism in severe cases. Animal studies appear to confirm a relationship between envenoming and an increase in circulating noradrenaline and adrenaline.

== Treatment ==
Similar to other box jellyfish stings, first aid consists of flushing the area with vinegar to neutralize the tentacle stinging apparatus. As no antivenom is available, treatment is largely supportive, with analgesia being the mainstay of management. Nitroglycerin, a common drug used for cardiac conditions, is utilised by medical personnel to minimise the risk of pulmonary edema and to reduce hypertension. Antihistamines may be of benefit for pain relief, but most cases require intravenous opioid analgesia. Fentanyl or morphine are usually chosen. Pethidine (meperidine, brand name Demerol in the US) should be avoided, as large doses are often required for pain relief and in this situation significant adverse effects from the pethidine metabolite norpethidine may occur.

Magnesium sulfate (epsom salts) has been proposed as a treatment for Irukandji syndrome after being apparently successfully used in one case. Early evidence suggested a benefit; however, according to a later report, a series of three patients failed to show any improvement with magnesium; the author emphasized the experimental status of this treatment. Some preliminary laboratory experiments using the venom extracted from Malo maxima (the 'Broome Irukandji') on rat cardiovascular tissue in vitro has suggested that magnesium does in fact block many of the actions of this venom.

== Epidemiology ==
Reports of Irukandji syndrome have come from Australia, the United States (Hawaii and Florida), the French Antilles, Bonaire, the Caribbean, Timor Leste and Papua New Guinea. Cubozoan species other than Carukia barnesi are presumed to be responsible for envenomations outside Australia.

== History ==
In 1961 Jack Barnes confirmed the cause of the then mysterious Irukandji syndrome was a sting from a small box jellyfish: the Irukandji jellyfish, which can fire venom-filled stingers out of its body and into passing victims. To prove that the jellyfish was the cause of the syndrome, he captured one and deliberately stung himself, his 9-year-old son and a local lifeguard, then observed the resulting symptoms. Other cubozoans possibly can cause Irukandji syndrome; those positively identified include Carukia barnesi, Alatina alata, Malo maxima, Malo kingi, Carybdea xaymacana, Keesingia gigas, an as-yet unnamed "fire jelly", and another unnamed species.

== Society and culture ==
A 2005 Discovery Channel program, Killer Jellyfish, portrayed the severity of the pain from an Irukandji jellyfish sting when two Australian researchers (Jamie Seymour and Teresa Carrette) were stung. Another program aired on the Discovery Channel, Stings, Fangs and Spines, featured a 20-minute spot on Irukandji syndrome. In the segment, a young Australian woman was stung and developed a severe case.

A 2007 fictional Sea Patrol episode (S1, E4) involves two crew members of HMAS Hammersley being stung by an Irukandji jellyfish.

On the television program Super Animal, a woman compared her experience with Irukandji syndrome to the pain of childbirth.

Steve Backshall reports with accounts from victims of Irukandji stings on his ITV wildlife series Fierce in 2016.
