= Carybdea xaymacana =

Conservation status
- Data Deficient (IUCN 3.1)

Scientific classification
- Kingdom: Animalia
- Phylum: Cnidaria
- Class: Cubozoa
- Order: Carybdeida
- Family: Carybdeidae
- Genus: Carybdea
- Species: C. xaymacana

Binomial name
- Carybdea xaymacana (Conant, 1897)

Species of jellyfish

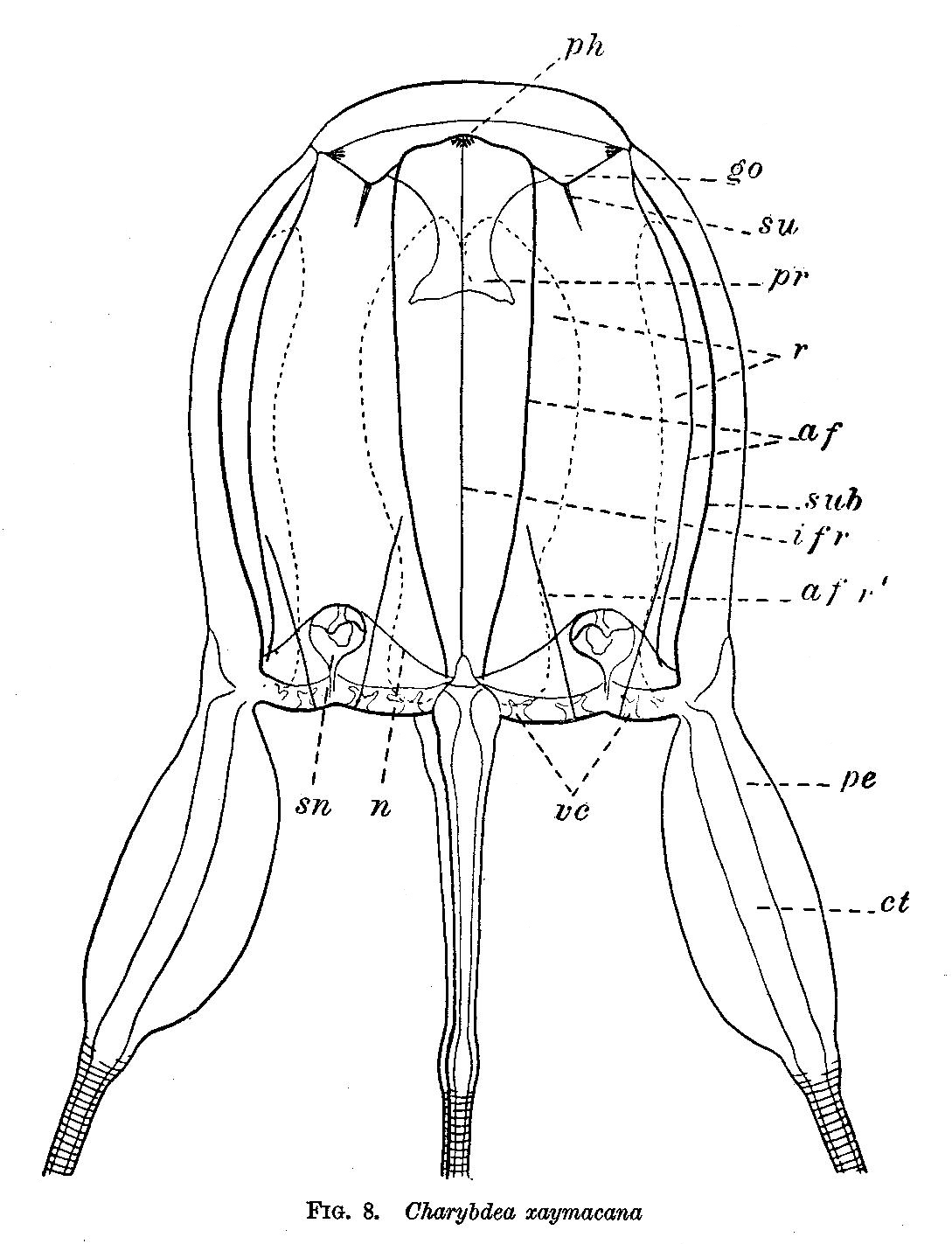
Carybdea xaymacana

Carybdea xaymacana is a venomous species of cnidarian, in the small family Carybdeidae within the class Cubozoa. The species has been documented off the coast of Mexico and Australia. To distinguish this species from other cubozoans along the Mexican coasts, one can note its four pedalia, each containing a single tentacle, and its heart-shaped rhopaliar niche ostium.
