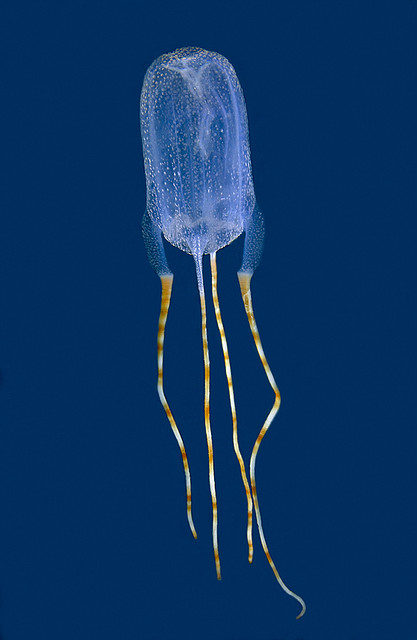

Scientific classification
- Kingdom: Animalia
- Phylum: Cnidaria
- Class: Cubozoa
- Order: Carybdeida
- Family: Tamoyidae
- Genus: Tamoya
- Species: T. ohboya

Binomial name
- Tamoya ohboya Collins et al., 2011

= Tamoya ohboya =

Species of jellyfish

Tamoya ohboya, also known as the Bonaire banded box jellyfish, is a species of box jellyfish formally described in 2011. Tamoya ohboya was discovered by a biologist and educator, William Gillan. In order to name the newly discovered species, Coalition on the Public Understanding of Science organized an online competition, which was won by the high school marine biology teacher Lisa Peck, who said: "I bet ‘Oh Boy’ is the first thing said when a biologist or layman encounters the Bonaire Banded Box Jellyfish." It is the first species of the genus Tamoya to be discovered in over 100 years. The International Institute for Species Exploration included it in a list of Top Ten New Species in 2011.

The species was discovered in the waters of the Dutch Caribbean islands (then part of the Netherlands Antilles). There have been roughly 70 confirmed sightings since 1989, approximately 45 of which took place in the waters of Bonaire and the rest off the shores of Mexico, St Lucia, Curaçao, Barbados, Honduras and St Vincent. The closely related species Tamoya haplonema lives in the waters of Brazil and the south-eastern United States of America. Tamoya ohboya is characterized by a deep stomach, densely spread cnidocysts and banded tentacles whose color ranges from reddish-orange to dark brown. Tamoya ohboya is hard to collect due to its fast swimming and ungregarious nature. Its ecology is still relatively unknown, but it is presumed that it is a daylight predator whose prey includes small crustaceans and fish.

Like other box jellyfish, Tamoya ohboya is highly venomous. Since 1989, three people have reported being stung by Tamoya ohboya, which led to intense pain, skin damage and, in one of the cases, hospitalization. Its bell is shaped like a plastic bag.
