= Chiropsella bronzie =

Scientific classification
- Kingdom: Animalia
- Phylum: Cnidaria
- Class: Cubozoa
- Order: Chirodropida
- Family: Chiropsellidae
- Genus: Chiropsella
- Species: C. bronzie

Binomial name
- Chiropsella bronzie Gershwin, 2006

Species of fish

Chiropsella bronzie is a species of box jellyfish. It is considered much less of a threat to humans than some of its relatives. The species was described in 2006, and is one of four species in the genus Chiropsella. Chiropsella bronzie can be found in shallow waters off the coast of Queensland, Australia.

== Taxonomy ==
Chiropsella bronzie was previously misidentified in 1880 as Chiropsalmus quadrigata, an Indian Ocean cubozoan of the same order. It was later correctly identified as a new species by Gershwin in 2006. The species name bronzie is named after the Royal Life Saving Society's bronze medallion award for a qualified Life Saver.

The order Chirodropida consists of three major families: Chirodropidae, Chiropsalmidae, and Chiropsellidae containing the genera Meteorona and Chiropsella. Out of all cubozoan relationships, research has shown that the Meteorona kishinouyei and Chiropsella bronzie are the closest relatives, as they are the most phylogenically similar. Both species have similar morphological traits, such as an unbranched gastrovascular cavity saccule, whereas most other cubozoans' gastro cavity saccules are branched. Some morphological traits used to distinguish the two species are differences in number of tentacles and pedalium shape.

A morphological exception that C. bronzie holds, compared to other members of the order Chirodropida, is the presence of gastric filaments in its stomach, where other members lack these structures. Because of this exception, there has been proposals of adjusting Chirodropida taxonomy with the potential addition of another family.

== Description ==
Chiropsella bronzie belongs to the order Chirodropida, which can be distinguished from other box jellyfish by the presence of muscular masses on the medusa's four corners and saccules found in the gastrovascular cavity. The adult bell of the Chiropsella bronzie is small and rounded, and ranges from 3 to 5 cm in diameter, not exceeding 8 cm high and wide. Each corner of the C. bronzie medusae holds up to 9 tentacles on each stalk, or pedalium.

Chiropsella bronzie and other box jellyfish have very developed eyes and sensory structures. Box jellyfish have true eyes, which are found in clusters called rhopalia. Chiropsella bronzie has 24 eyes and 4 morphologically different types on rhopalia, Two of these eyes are camera type eyes, which consist of one upper lens and one lower lens eyes, and two pigment slit eyes. However, similar to Tripedalia cystophora, C. bronzie have shown to have weaker eyes than other cubazoa species due to weaker lenses to focus images on the retina. This is most likely due to eyes being ellipsoid in shape and very soft, unlike the spherical shape of other cubozoa that contain more sensory power. Research also suggests that C. bronzie are most likely color blind, a factor that does not inhibit obstacle avoidance. This variation in box jellyfish sensory systems is expected due to the wide range of habitat cubozoa occupy, including sandy beaches, mangroves, kelp forests, the open ocean, and coal reefs. The complexity of box jellyfish eyes allows for more advanced swimming and navigational behavior, such as increased awareness of surroundings and directional swimming.

== Distribution and habitat ==
Cubozoan are distributed globally, but are commonly found in tropical waters in the Indo-Pacific region. C. bronzie is located in shallow waters near Queensland, Australia, specifically from Cooktown to Townsville, Australia. These beach habitats contain mangrove trees, sandy bottoms, and coral reefs. After heavy rainfalls, C. bronzie habitats include sunken natural debris, such as branches and large rocks, that jellyfish need to navigate.

== Ecology ==
The life cycle of cubozoans can be simplified down to four stages: egg, swimming larvae, sessile polyps, and swimming medusae. Body plans are reorganized between each stage during metamorphosis, with the exception of development from egg to larvae. In the final metamorphosis, box jellyfish develop complex nervous systems, including advanced visual organs. The rhopalia nervous system (RNS) is also developed during the final body reorganization.

Box jellyfish can exhibit both asexual and sexual reproduction. Sexual reproduction occurs during the medusa stage, where the adult male jellyfish releases sperm into the water, and the female releases eggs to be fertilized. In some cases, the male medusa can directly inseminate the female using a sperm packet. In this case, the eggs will develop inside the bell as opposed to the open water. Fertilized eggs then develop into a jellyfish larvae stage called a planula. These larvae contain cilia that allow them to swim throughout the water column. Box jellyfish remain in the planula larvae phase until settling on a hard surface on the seafloor where they will develop into a polyp.

Box jellyfish can also reproduce by means of asexual reproduction through budding, where settled jellyfish polyps can create small cloned "buds" on their body stalks. Once a bud is fully formed, it will break off of the polyp and develop into a medusae. Another difference between true jellyfish (scyphozoans) and cubozoans is that the entire cubozoan polyp develops into a medusae, as opposed to going through strobilation. The habitat of Chiropsella bronzie polyps is still unknown, but research suggests they settle near or on beaches and mangroves. In addition, it is unknown how long C. bronzie remains in the polyp stage before maturing to their final medusa stage. Once reaching the final stage, adult box jellyfish will spawn and begin the reproductive cycle again. Cubozoans have shown to have short life spans of two years of less.

== Behavior ==
Box jellyfish tend to move much faster than other jellyfish, with Chiropsella bronzie having a maximum speed of 7–8 cm per second against a 1 cm per second current. Unlike true jellyfish who tend to simply float along with currents, cubozoans are known to be effective predators that hunt using their complex eyes. Their prey consists of mostly shrimp, specifically Acestes australis.

== Sting and toxicity ==
The venom contained in C. bronzie's cnidocytes is much less potent than other cubozoans, as there has been no evidence that C. bronzie can deliver a lethal sting to a human. However, studies have shown that the venom of C. bronzie has adversely affected the cardiovascular system of anesthetized rats in laboratory settings by greatly lowering their heart rate. The venom of C. bronzie may be very similar to that of Chironex fleckeri, but potentially less potent. This could be confirmed by the fact C. bronzie are more abundant than C. fleckeri, but have no history to be the cause of human fatalities. A stronger venom would also allow C. bronzie to feed on fish, while their diet is limited to smaller prey, like shrimp. More research is needed to increase understanding of just how harmful the venom of C. broznie can be to humans.
