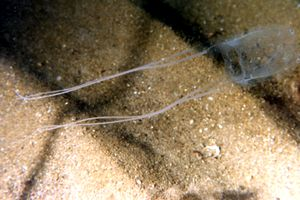
- Carybdea marsupialis

Scientific classification
- Kingdom: Animalia
- Phylum: Cnidaria
- Class: Cubozoa
- Order: Carybdeida
- Family: Carybdeidae; Gegenbaur, 1857
- Genus: Carybdea; Péron & Lesueur, 1810

Species
- See text

= Carybdea =

Genus of jellyfishes

Carybdea is a genus of venomous box jellyfish within the family Carybdeidae that currently consists of a total of 8 species. This genus of jellyfish are often found in warm waters around the world in waters such as the Mediterranean Sea, the Pacific Ocean, and off the coast of Africa. Their sting can cause a range of effects depending on the species. These invertebrates will go through both sexual and asexual reproduction as they transform from a polyp to medusa. Carybdea have a box-shaped bell with four tentacles and eye-like sensory structures. There are distinct physical markings that differentiate many species within the genus. While Carybdea use their venom to act as predators, they are also preyed on by turtles and various fish. They feed on plankton, invertebrates, fish, and some crustaceans.

== Classification ==
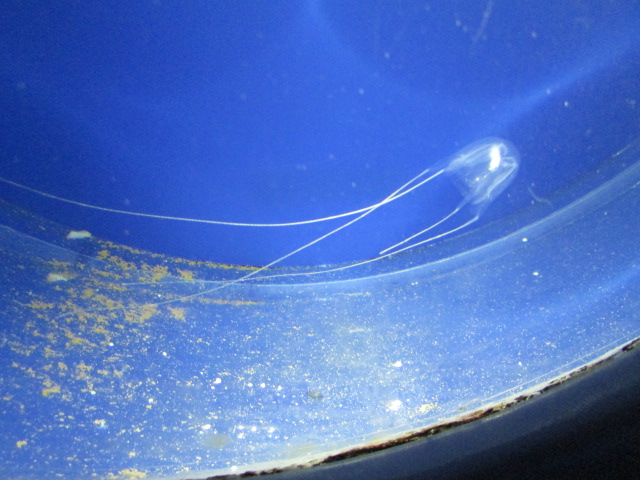
Carybdea brevipedalia

=== Class ===
This genus of venomous box jellyfish is categorized in the class Cubozoa. Cubozoans are referred to as box jellyfish due to the fact that when viewing the transverse section of the bells they appear to be in the shape of a square. At each corner of the square, there are clusters of tentacles. A specific feature of the Cubozoan tentacles is their flatted base at the end of each tentacle.

=== Family ===
This genus of species can further be classified into the family Carybdeidae which requires the species to have four tentacles or four groups of two or three that are separately attached to its own unbranched Pedalium.

=== Genus ===
The genus itself must have a few qualifications to fall under Carybdea. The stomach cannot be suspended from mesenteries, and the gastric cirri are found at the corners of the stomach or in crescentic areas. The velarial canals, which are extensions of the gut, and have only 2-4 branches. Currently, Carybdea is the only genus with Carybdeidae that has a distinct feature of a heart-shaped rhopaliar niche ostium with a single, upper covering scale and no lower scales.

=== Species ===
A recent study posed the question of whether or not the species C. marsupialis, found in Caribbean waters, is part of the genus Carybdea. The studies showed some differences that were concluded between medusae of C. marsupialis from two different locations, Mediterranean and Puerto Rico. This hypothesis is still under review. Currently, there are 10 species that fall under this genus.

- Carybdea arborifera
- Carybdea branchi
- Carybdea brevipedalia
- Carybdea confusa
- Carybdea marsupialis
- Carybdea murrayana
- Carybdea rastonii
- Carybdea xaymacana
- Carybdea sivickisi.
- Carybdea wayamba

== Geographic range ==
Some species are widespread such as the species Carybdea sivickisi. This species can be found in temperate, tropical, and subtropical locations during the warmer months of the year for mating. More specifically, Carybdea sivickisi are commonly found in warm waters of the Western Pacific Ocean ranging from Japan to New Zealand. Carybdea rastoni, another common species, is known to inhabit warm shallow waters. It is commonly found in the warm waters of Hawaii, Australia, Japan, and the Philippines. Carybdea swim to deeper waters in search of food.

== Life cycle ==
The life cycle of a box jellyfish consists first of sexual reproduction through a medusa (adult jellyfish) releasing sperm or eggs into the open water to fertilize the egg. The fertilized egg will then form into a planula (jellyfish larvae) that will travel around until it colonizes on the seafloor. At this stage, it will attach to coral or rock and develop into a polyp. There are two ways that a polyp can produce the medusa. The polyp can go through an asexual reproduction process called budding, where the jellyfish will make small clone growths that separate and develop into a medusa, or the original polyp can develop into the medusa. These jellyfish live for about one year.

A study conducted in 2005 reveals an additional stage that the species Carybdea marsupialis carries out. I. Straehler-Pohl and G. Jarms describe the second type of metamorphosis that results in a regenerative remnant. This medusa form is thought to be from strobilation known from scyphozoa. The results of this study show that nearly 45% of the C. marsupialis studied had this regenerative remnant and those that did had a higher rate of asexual propagation.

In 2014, researchers investigated the increase in the density of the C. marsupialis species. The study concluded that the proliferation could be from a couple of factors such as climate change, food availability, and overfishing. Another possible component is the man-made structures such as docks, marinas, and breakwaters that allow for more planula settlement and asexual reproduction of the polyp stage.

== Venom and treatment ==
The severity of venomous jellyfish stings varies between species and can cause many different effects on humans, however, the correlation of these effects is not related to tentacle size or the morphology of the jellyfish. Even within the genus Carybdea the effects of the stings can differ from species to species. The jellyfish, C. xaymacana is known only to cause local irritation, whereas C. marsupialis has toxins that can cause a burning sensation and local edema. C. rastoni can be painful upon impact and result in linear and frequently four in number, ranging from 10 to 20 cm long. A study done to evaluate the neurotoxicity of the C. marsupialis showed that this species stings can be harmful since the venom encompasses molecules that target ion channels and G protein-coupled receptors expressed in the nervous system of vertebrates. Carybdea is one of three genera whose sting can result in Irukandji syndrome which includes delayed pain due to severe muscle cramping, vomiting, anxiety, restlessness, sweating, and prostration. However, the research of the venom in this genus needs to be studied further.

A popular remedy for the pain, inflammation, and any remaining tentacle pieces from the sting is vinegar. When stings occur vinegar can come to the rescue by inactivating the nematocyst (specialized cells in the tentacles of jellyfish). A controversial topic surrounding the treatment of jellyfish stings is whether or not to apply a pressure-immobilization bandage. There is some evidence that shows applying pressure can cause the discharge of additional venom from partial nematocysts and vinegar-soaked nematocyst. Currently, the Australian Resuscitation Council suggests that the most effective treatment is to soak the area with vinegar and transport it to a healthcare facility as needed until further research is conducted.

== Predators and prey ==
Carybdea use the nematocysts on their tentacles to sting, kill, and capture their prey. The genus Carybdea are predators, and eat a variety of things. Many species within the genus feed on zooplankton, such as Carybdea marsupialis. Carybdea commonly feed on plankton and mysids that are found in deeper waters. However, due to their powerful stinging abilities, some species of Carybdea are known to capture and kill various small invertebrates, including shrimp, and fish. Worms are also a source of food for Carybdea. In some species, crustaceans and polychaetes are also prey.

To defend themselves, Carybdea also use their stinging tentacles and venom to ward off predators. These nematocysts are arranged in a ring formation, and it is believed so that the surface area of the predator to the nematocysts is greater and therefore causes greater harm. Predators may vary from species to species depending on what body of water each species lives in. For example, some of the most prominent predators of Carybdea alata include sea turtles, batfish, butterfish, and crabs. Not all predators are affected by the Carybdea's sting. Sea turtles that eat C. alata are affected by the venom as other predators would be. Humans are often unintentional predators of Carybdea. Owing to the transparency of many species' bells, swimmers often do not see the organisms in the water. When a human comes in contact with one of the tentacles of the Carybdea, its natural instinct to defend itself and sting the human occurs. The severity of the sting and its side effects varies from species to species.

== Anatomy and physiology ==
While there are many species within the genus Carybdea, the anatomy and physiology of each species is generally the same with some minor differences to distinguish between the species. As the name suggests, Carybdea exist as a cube shaped bell. The bell is composed of two layers, the ectoderm and the endoderm. On the inside of the bell is the gut. Carybdea also have sophisticated eyes with lenses that can detect light. These sensory structures are known as rhopalia, and can be found within the bell of the organism. The rhopalia contain lenses, corneas, and retinas. Within these eye-like structures are two ocelli, lens eyes, and a statolith. Looking up through the Carybdea you will see the mouth. Most species rage in size anywhere from 15 mm to 40 mm in their adult life. Attached to each corner of the box shaped ball are four tentacles that range in length from species to species. These tentacles are attached to the bell through the pedalium. On these tentacles are specialized cells known as nematocysts. These cells contain a coiled barb that when in contact with something will uncoil and fire, and release venom. Nematocysts are arranged in rings on the tentacles. A common characteristic of Carybdea is tan spots on the bell.

Many of the species within the genus spend the majority of their lives in the medusa stage, however a few species have the ability to attach and exist in the polyp stage. Because they are almost always in their medusa stage, they are almost constantly swimming.

However, there are some physical differences amongst species within the Genus Carybdea. For example, the species Carybdea marsupialis can be distinguished from other species by the red banding on their tentacles. Additionally, female Carybdea marsupialis have orange spots on their bells, but males do not. The species Carybdea sivickisi have yellow-colored tentacles, and similarly to Carybdea marsupialis only the females have orange spots on the bell. Carybdea rastoni are often difficult to see in the water but are distinguishable by their pinkish gonads that are able to be seen through the bell.
