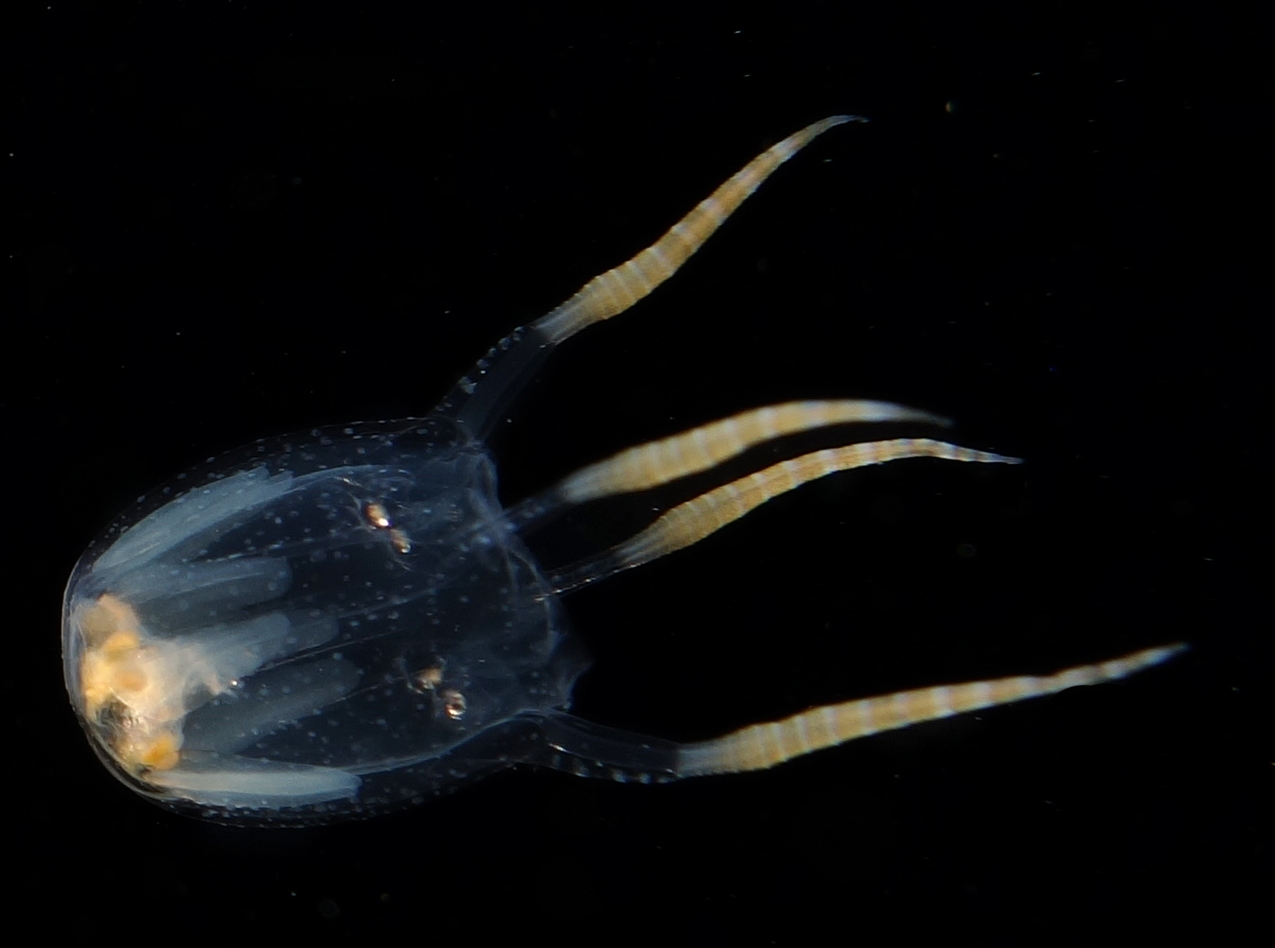

Scientific classification
- Kingdom: Animalia
- Phylum: Cnidaria
- Class: Cubozoa
- Order: Carybdeida
- Family: Tripedaliidae
- Genus: Copula; Bentlage, Cartwright, Yanagihara, Lewis, Richards & Collins, 2010
- Species: C. sivickisi

Binomial name
- Copula sivickisi (Stiasny, 1926)

Synonyms
- Carybdea sivickisi Stiasny, 1926

= Copula sivickisi =

Species of jellyfish

Copula is a monotypic genus of box jellyfish in the family Tripedaliidae of the phylum Cnidaria. The only species in the genus is Copula sivickisi, a very small gelatinous, bell-shaped jellyfish with four tentacles that is active only at night. It is unusual among box jellyfish in having a mating ritual and internal fertilization. Its scientific name honours the Lithuanian zoologist Pranciškus Baltrus Šivickis.

== Description ==
Copula sivickisi is a very small species of jellyfish, the medusa growing to about 10 mm (0.4 in) in diameter. The bell is a more "boxy" shape than that of the umbrella-like true jellyfishes. The eight gonads can be seen inside the transparent bell. In males these are orange hemispherical structures near the apex of the bell, and in females they are white-speckled, leaf-like structures. There is a central manubrium, a transparent tubular structure hanging down from the centre of the underside of the bell and there are four slender tentacles hanging from the rim, each banded with orange. In mature females, the edge of the bell is patterned with orange-brown markings.

== Distribution ==
Copula sivickisi is found in shallow warm waters in the Pacific Ocean and one Indian Ocean location (the west coast of Sumatra). Its range extends from Japan and Taiwan to the Philippines, Vietnam and Thailand, northern Australia, New Zealand, Micronesia and Hawaii.

== Behaviour ==
Copula sivickisi is nocturnal and hides during the day. There are adhesive pads on the top of the bell and it can secure itself with these to objects. On sinking to the seabed soon after dawn it spends a few minutes selecting a good location and preferentially chooses the underside of a coral, stone or blade of seagrass. It then folds its tentacles inside the bell and flattens itself, making it very difficult for humans to observe it in its natural environment. It reactivates soon after dusk and rises in the water column before starting feeding. Most jellyfish liberate sperm and eggs into the sea and fertilisation is a chancy business, but this jellyfish has been observed to have a more elaborate mating ritual. A male will grab a female by one tentacle and start to pull her around. The pair entwine and place their manubria close together. The male then passes a red spermatophore (bundle of sperm) to one of the female's tentacles which thrusts it into her manubrium. Females have been observed mating in this way with several different males, up to eight times in a two-hour period. Eggs inside the female's bell are fertilised by the sperm, and a mucous strand of embryos is produced and released into the sea some two or three days later. Here they develop into polyps, another stage in the complex life cycle of Cnidaria.

Copula sivickisi has twenty-four eyes grouped on four stalked rhopalia situated on the rim of the bell. It is attracted to light and feeds on zooplankton including phosphorescent organisms. Its typical feeding mechanism is to rise to the surface and then sink through the water with its tentacles extended to catch prey. Typical prey items are copepods, hooded shrimps, zoea larvae and the bioluminescent dinoflagellate Noctiluca, all of which are present near the water surface at night.

The medusae present an average maximum swimming speed of 4.9 cm per second, exceeding the speed of the currents near the surface of the shallow waters they were found in. A maximum of 12 cm per second was observed in short bursts.
