= Tamoya gargantua =

Conservation status
- Data Deficient (IUCN 2.3)

Scientific classification
- Kingdom: Animalia
- Phylum: Cnidaria
- Class: Cubozoa
- Order: Carybdeida
- Family: Tamoyidae
- Genus: Tamoya
- Species: T. gargantua

Binomial name
- Tamoya gargantua Haeckel, 1880

Species of jellyfish

Tamoya gargantua, commonly known as the warty sea wasp, is a venomous jellyfish in the genus Tamoya. Its tentacle height is 22 cm, and the width of the bell is 13 cm. It is found on the shores of Eastern Africa, Samoa, and some of the islands in the Indian Ocean. They can be found in bays in those areas.

== Description ==
T. gargantua has a bell that can measure up to 22 centimeters in height and 11 centimeters in diameter: these are large dimensions among the box jellyfish and have earned it its name. The cap is transparent, with small, whitish, wart-like muscular extensions (pedalia) at the four corners of the square base, separated by a lace-like membrane. From each pedalium a tentacle grows, about twenty centimeters in length. The sting from this species causes a strong and long-lasting pain.

== Distribution and habitat ==
Adult medusae are pelagic, occasionally approaching the coasts of the Indian and western Pacific oceans, and can become frequent in the Persian Gulf and Red Sea. This species lives in shallow inlets. Young specimens come to the surface at night, while they remain on the bottom during the day. T. gargantua could be conspecific with the Atlantic Tamoya haplonema.

T. gargantua as described by Ernst Haeckel came from the Samoan Islands, and both Henry Bryant Bigelow and other naturalists agreed in identifying this species as T. bursaria and the various T. alata previously described in the Indo-Pacific. The name T. haeckeli is a synonym invented to distinguish the species from T. gargantua "sensu" Lesson (1829), different in description and not belonging to the genus Tamoya.
