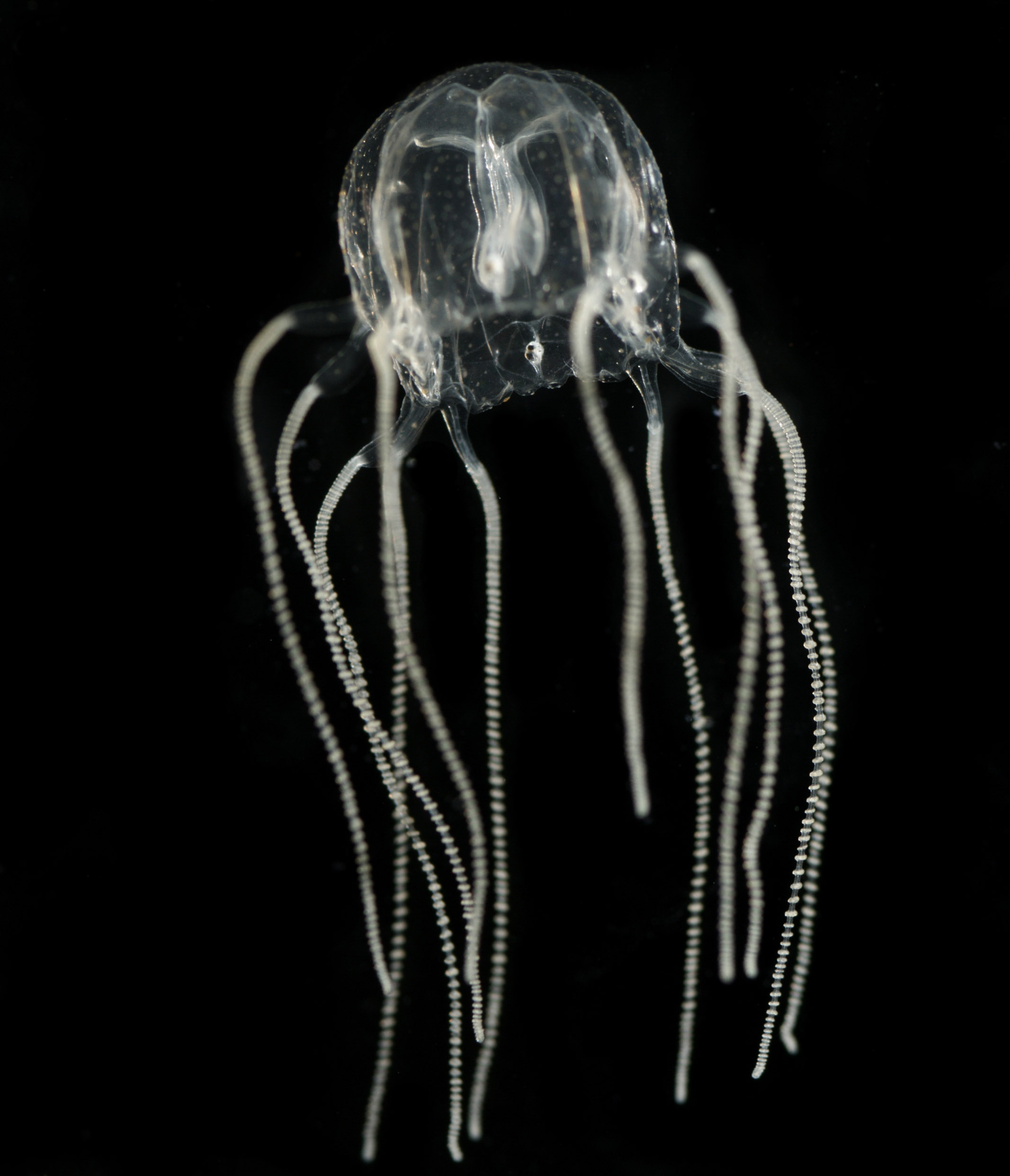

Scientific classification
- Kingdom: Animalia
- Phylum: Cnidaria
- Class: Cubozoa
- Order: Carybdeida
- Family: Tripedaliidae
- Genus: Tripedalia; Conant, 1897

Species
- Tripedalia binata; Tripedalia cystophora; Tripedalia maipoensis

= Tripedalia =

Type of jellyfish

Tripedalia is a genus within the family Tripedaliidae that is part of the box jellyfish, also known as the Cubozoa. There are only three known species within Tripedalia: T. cystophora, T. binata and T. maipoensis.

== Biology ==
Tripedalia are relatively small in size, ranging from 11 to 15 mm. Both species have a cuboid bell and are transparent with a yellowish to brownish color. Their bells contain nematocyst warts that are mainly around the outline of T. cystophora and are thinly spread throughout T. binata. As part of the Cubozoans, Tripedalia have knife-shaped pedalia, and their padalial canals are also bent. They have bead-like structured tentacles, and both species have flat stomachs with four gastric pouches. Inside their gastric pouches are butterfly-shaped gonads separated by interradial septa.

== Distribution and habitat ==
The T. cystophora has been documented in various locations across the globe. They have been observed in the Philippines, Ecuador, Japan, India, Puerto Rico, Brazil, Indonesia, Australia, and Florida. On the other hand, the distribution of T. binata is less well known than that of T. cystophora, although it has been reported in Thailand, Australia, and India. T. maipoensis was discovered in Mai Po Marshes, Hong Kong, its only known habitat, in 2023.

These jellyfish are commonly found in shallow waters near the shore and mangroves during the day, where they scavenge for food and hide from predators. However, little is known about their movement patterns at night. Some observations suggest that they may move towards coral reefs during the nighttime hours. It is possible that these jellyfish use the reefs as a source of food, or as a place to hide from predators.

== Diet ==
Tripedalia has an advanced eye structure making it an efficient hunter and navigator within mangrove habitats. Box jellyfish have 24 eyes that are categorized into four morphological types. These four types are made up of two pigment cup eyes and two lens eyes that enhance the jellyfish’s ability to navigate their environment and detect prey or predators. Tripedalia move throughout light when emersed in the mangrove roots allowing for it to capture copepods, while at night, it moves to the bottom of the lagoon. Tripedalia have great sense of direction and navigational skills allowing for it to move throughout the mangroves and hunt its prey during the day and night. Since jellyfish are very delicate and can easily be damaged, the Tripedalia have great vision and swimming capabilities in order to maneuver themselves throughout their environment.

== Reproduction ==
Tripedalia's life cycle involves two phases of body transformation: from swimming hatchlings to sessile polyps and from sessile polyps to free-swimming medusae. The female medusa's gastral pockets produce planulae from fertilized eggs, which settle and produce polyps with asexual buds. Tripedalia polyps have the capacity to both settle and creep, and they can produce creeping polyps through budding. This adaptability is well-suited for their natural habitat in mangrove swamps, where the conditions are often muddy. This ability helps Tripedalia by preventing polyps from becoming buried in the sediment. Tripedalia's polyp undergoes a unique metamorphosis into a single medusa with complex structures like the CNS and visual organs developing during this stage. The polyps the medusa exhibits increased cell proliferation in the rhopalia and pedalia during juvenile stages and metamorphosis, with a diurnal pattern observed in some body parts. The developing medusa undergoes a transformation in histology, including improvements to the sensory system and visual organs.
