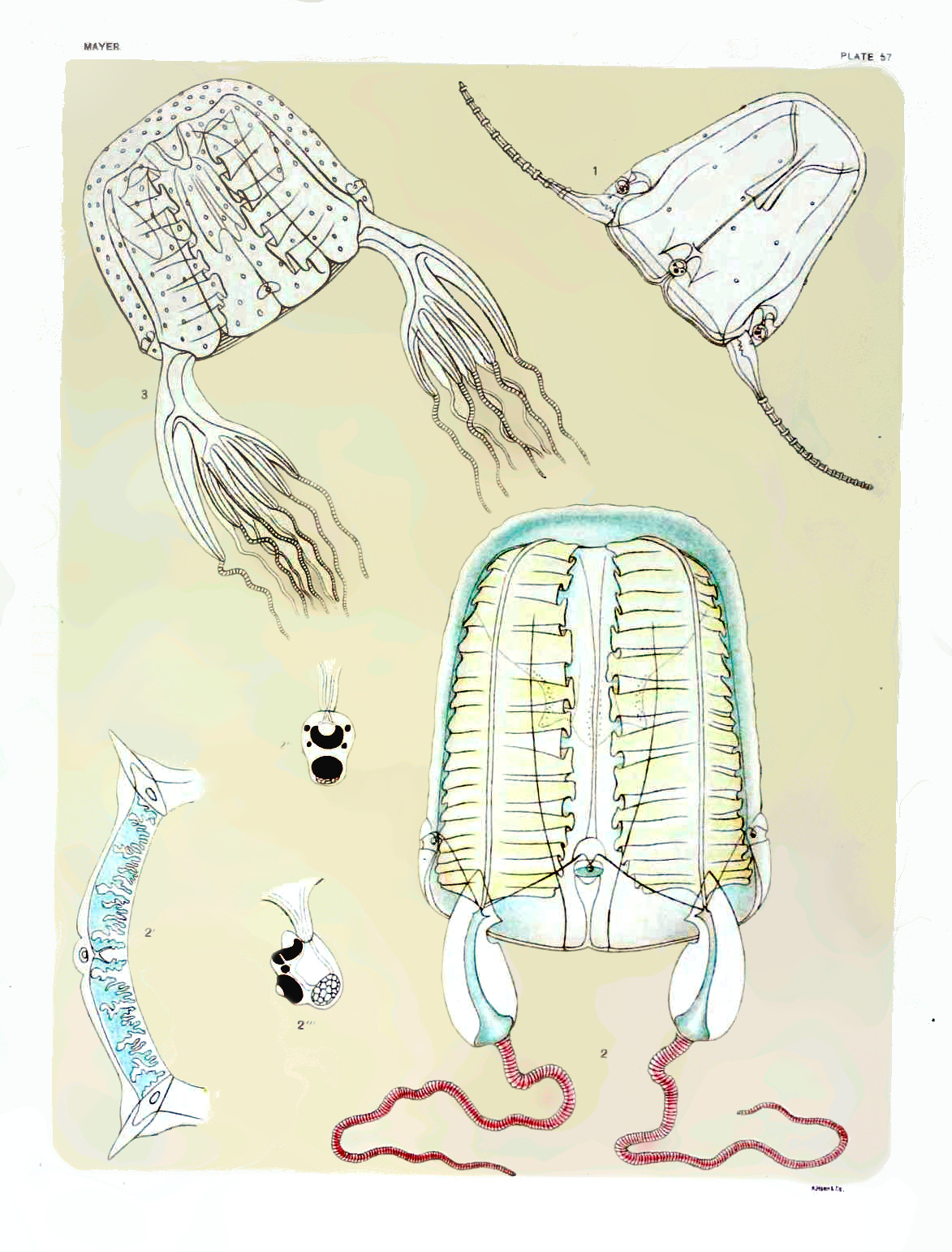
- Illustration from Medusae of the World by Alfred G. Mayer (1910)

Scientific classification
- Kingdom: Animalia
- Phylum: Cnidaria
- Class: Cubozoa
- Order: Carybdeida
- Family: Tamoyidae
- Genus: Tamoya
- Species: T. haplonema

Binomial name
- Tamoya haplonema F. Müller, 1859

= Tamoya haplonema =

Species of box jellyfish

Tamoya haplonema is a species of box jellyfish in the genus Tamoya. It is the type species of the genus and was described in 1859. The medusa possesses four tentacles, one each on an inter-radial pedal.

== Body ==
They possess 4 tentacles, one each on an inter-radial pedal. Like other cubomedusae, Tamoya haplonema has four rhopalia with a statolith and four simple eyes and two camera eyes on each rhopalium.

== Diet ==
Tamoya haplonema prey on fish. They have also been observed interacting with fish outside of the predator prey relationship, with the fish going inside the jellyfish and around the tentacles without being consumed.

== Habitat ==
It is native to the western Atlantic, and specimens have been found from Argentina to Long Island. Some specimens have been found in the Gulf of Mexico, off the coasts of Mississippi and Alabama. They were once thought to live off the coast of Africa, but those sightings have since been attributed to actually be a different species, Tamoya ancamori.

== Toxicity ==
Like other box jellyfish, they are highly venomous and have been known to sting humans. If stung, vinegar should be applied to deactivate the nematocysts in the skin. Cold seawater compress should also be applied.
