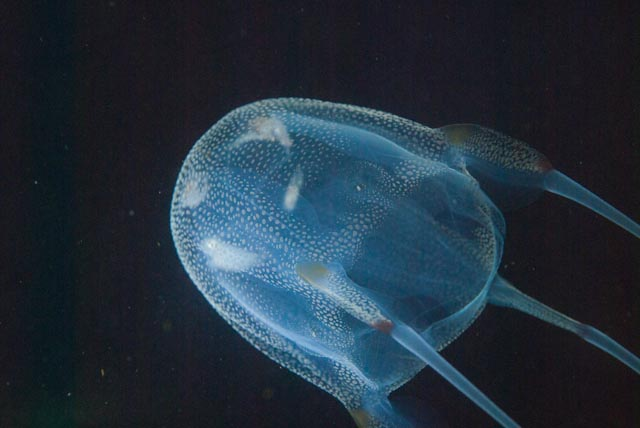

Scientific classification
- Kingdom: Animalia
- Phylum: Cnidaria
- Class: Cubozoa
- Order: Carybdeida
- Family: Carybdeidae
- Genus: Carybdea
- Species: C. murrayana

Binomial name
- Carybdea murrayana Haeckel, 1880

Synonyms
- Carybdea branchi Gershwin & Gibbons, 2009

= Carybdea murrayana =

Species of jellyfish

Carybdea murrayana, the South African box jellyfish, is a venomous species of cnidarian, in the small family Carybdeidae within the class Cubozoa.

== Description ==
This small box jellyfish grows up to 7 cm (2.8 in) across and may have tentacles of up to 2 m (6.6 ft) in total length. It has a transparent box-shaped bell with a very long tentacle trailing from each corner.

The animal is described as being robust and having a well sculpted in particular, single rooted with multiple stems, velarial canals 2 per octant, pedalia knee bend upwards turned volcano shaped. Also known to have a brownish pigmentation of the phacellae and pedalia.

== Distribution ==
This jellyfish is found from the north of Namibia around the South African coast to Port Elizabeth from the surface to a depth of at least 35 m (115 ft) underwater.

== Ecology ==
This jellyfish is often seen in swarms. The tentacles have a painful sting, although the sting is not known to be fatal. It is eaten by the sunfishes, Mola mola and Mola ramsayi, as well as the slender sunfish, Ranzania laevis.
