= Carybdea arborifera =

Conservation status
- Data Deficient (IUCN 3.1)

Scientific classification
- Kingdom: Animalia
- Phylum: Cnidaria
- Class: Cubozoa
- Order: Carybdeida
- Family: Carybdeidae
- Genus: Carybdea
- Species: C. arborifera

Binomial name
- Carybdea arborifera (Maas, 1897)

Species of jellyfish

Carybdea arborifera is a venomous species of cnidarian, in the small family Carybdeidae within the class Cubozoa. The species is rarely seen, but has been observed off the coast of Hawaii.
