= Carybdea confusa =

Conservation status
- Data Deficient (IUCN 3.1)

Scientific classification
- Kingdom: Animalia
- Phylum: Cnidaria
- Class: Cubozoa
- Order: Carybdeida
- Family: Carybdeidae
- Genus: Carybdea
- Species: C. confusa

Binomial name
- Carybdea confusa (Straehler-Pohl, Matsumoto & Acevedo, 2017)

Species of jellyfish

Carybdea confusa is a venomous species of cnidarian, in the small family Carybdeidae within the class Cubozoa. The species can be found in kelp forests off the coast of California.
