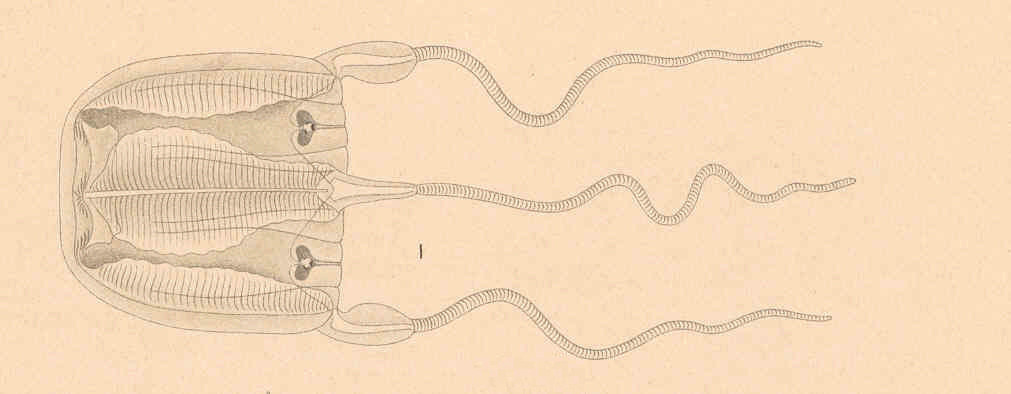

Conservation status
- Data Deficient (IUCN 3.1)

Scientific classification
- Kingdom: Animalia
- Phylum: Cnidaria
- Class: Cubozoa
- Order: Carybdeida
- Family: Carybdeidae
- Genus: Carybdea
- Species: C. rastonii

Binomial name
- Carybdea rastonii (Haacke, 1886)

Synonyms
- Carybdea rastoni

= Carybdea rastonii =

Species of jellyfish

Carybdea rastonii is a venomous species of cnidarian, in the small family Carybdeidae within the class Cubozoa. The IUCN has not evaluated this species of jellyfish, and no official assessment of its extinction status has been done yet.
