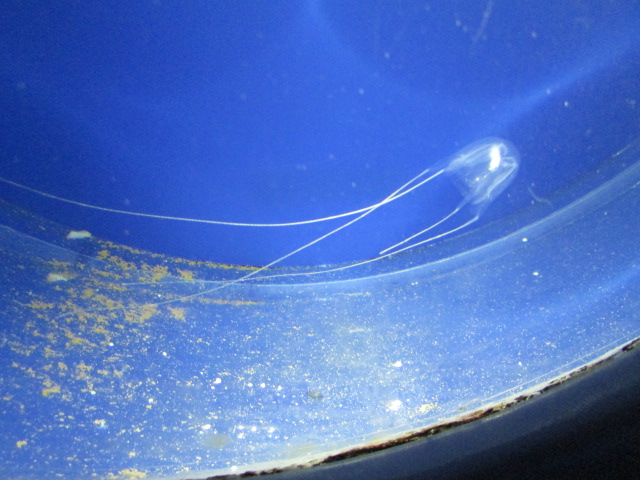

Scientific classification
- Kingdom: Animalia
- Phylum: Cnidaria
- Class: Cubozoa
- Order: Carybdeida
- Family: Carybdeidae
- Genus: Carybdea
- Species: C. brevipedalia

Binomial name
- Carybdea brevipedalia (Kishinouye, 1891)

= Carybdea brevipedalia =

Species of jellyfish

Carybdea brevipedalia are a species of box jellyfish, originally found within the coastal waters of Japan, where it is one of the most common Cubozoans. This organism can be located off the islands of Hokkaido, Honshu, Shikoku, and Kyushu. Their distribution has recently expanded to Korean coastal waters.

C. brevipedalia was given the common name "Andon-Kurage" in Japan, as their body figure resembles a Japanese lamp structure. They are nocturnal predators known for their active swimming behavior, helping distinguish it from other box jellyfish. These species are active predators in the waters they reside in, using their highly toxic venom to capture prey. This predatory behavior reflects their role within marine ecosystems, influencing trophic dynamic and distribution of populations.

== Taxonomy and life cycle ==
Carybdea brevipedalia belong to the Phylum Cnidaria, which are known for their uniquely diverse life cycle. They are a part of the class Cubozoa, characterized by their cube/bell shaped body structure. Their order, Carybdeida and family, Carybdeidae are notorious for their aggressive predatory behavior and advanced locomotion. This species belongs to the phylum Cnidaria, acquiring its name from a defining feature of its tentacles, cnidae.

C. brevipedalia sustain a metagenic life cycle, consisting of an asexual polyp stage and sexual reproducing medusa. This process is initiated when fertilized eggs attach to benthic substrates. They tend to favor hard surfaces such as rocks or shells, which offer stability during polyp formation. On these surfaces where larvae transform into polyps, they reproduce asexually through budding. As they progress through their life cycle, polyps develop into medusae. Medusae are able to expand their distribution through their mobility, which is not observed in earlier life stages.

== Habitat ==
C. brevipedalia can primarily be found in shallow tropical waters around 3m deep, at preferred temperatures around 25 °C. They commonly gravitate towards sand and small rocks, for desired environmental conditions, prey availability, and protection.

The presence of this species can fluctuate based on their environment's salinity levels. Consistent with other Cubozoans, Carybdea brevipedalia are most active during warm summer months, under salinity conditions that range from 26 to 28 PSU. Salinities dropping below 20 can lead to impaired movement and weakened activity for all jellyfish.

== Diet ==
Carybdea brevipedalia are carnivorous predators that display selective trophic behavior, targeting larger zooplankton and various small marine organisms. These organisms include copepods, mysids, zoeae, megalopae, polychaete, and fish larvae. They are a nocturnal predators as they capture a majority of their prey at night.

== Behavior and anatomy ==
The swimming behavior of C. brevipedalia consists of active movement through jet propulsion, at an average speed of 6 cm per second. This propulsion rate is notably higher than other cubozoan species. The movement of Carybdea brevipedalia is controlled by the contraction and relaxation of their bell, which facilitates propulsion through water intake and expulsion.

Carybdea brevipedalia display typical Cubozoan morphology, a gelatinous, translucent body structure with a milky white hue. Resembling other Cnidarians, C. brevipedalia are radially symmetric. This species possesses a bell shaped body with a diameter of 2–4 cm. Extending from each corner of their bell lie long tentacles that can lengthen up to 2m. Nematocysts lining the tentacles act as a defense and prey capture mechanism. In addition to the venomous tentacles around their bell, they also have specialized sensory organs called rhopalia. There are different types of eyes in the rhopalia that detect light and movement for safety and during navigation.

Their sting has a significant impact on public health in Japan, resulting in intense pain and potentially erythema, wheals, and blistered lesions.
