= Chiropsella =

Scientific classification
- Domain: Eukaryota
- Kingdom: Animalia
- Phylum: Cnidaria
- Class: Cubozoa
- Order: Chirodropida
- Family: Chiropsellidae
- Genus: Chiropsella; Gershwin, 2006

Genus of jellyfishes

Chiropsella is a genus of cnidarians belonging to the family Chiropsellidae.

The species of this genus are found in Australia.

Species:

- Chiropsella bart Gershwin & Alderslade, 2007
- Chiropsella bronzie Gershwin, 2006
- Chiropsella rudloei Bentlage, 2013
- Chiropsella saxoni Gershwin & Ekins, 2015
