= Tamoya ancamori =

Scientific classification
- Kingdom: Animalia
- Phylum: Cnidaria
- Class: Cubozoa
- Order: Carybdeida
- Family: Tamoyidae
- Genus: Tamoya
- Species: T. ancamori

Binomial name
- Tamoya ancamori Straehler-Pohl, 2020

Species of jellyfish

Tamoya ancamori is a species of box jellyfish in the genus Tamoya. It was found in West African waters. Little is known about this species as of October 2025.
