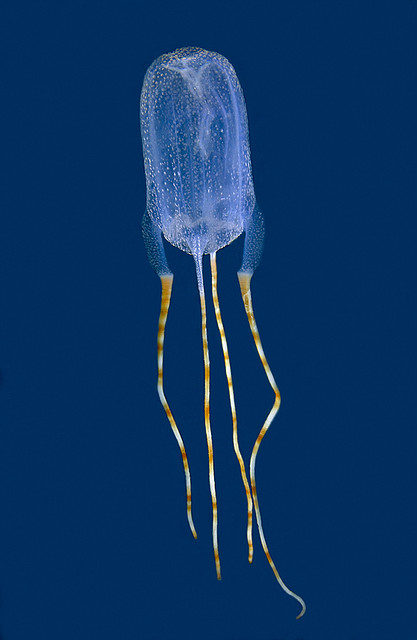
- Bonaire banded box jellyfish (Tamoya ohboya)

Scientific classification
- Domain: Eukaryota
- Kingdom: Animalia
- Phylum: Cnidaria
- Class: Cubozoa
- Order: Carybdeida
- Family: Tamoyidae; Haeckel, 1880
- Genus: Tamoya; Müller, 1859

Type species
- Tamoya haplonema Müller, 1859

= Tamoya =

Genus of jellyfishes

Tamoya is a genus of box jellyfish within the monotypic family Tamoyidae.

== Species ==
- Tamoya gargantua Haeckel, 1880
- Tamoya haplonema F. Müller, 1859
- Tamoya ohboya Collins, Bentlage, Gillan, Lynn, Morandini, Marques, 2011
- Tamoya ancamori Straehler-Pohl, 2020
