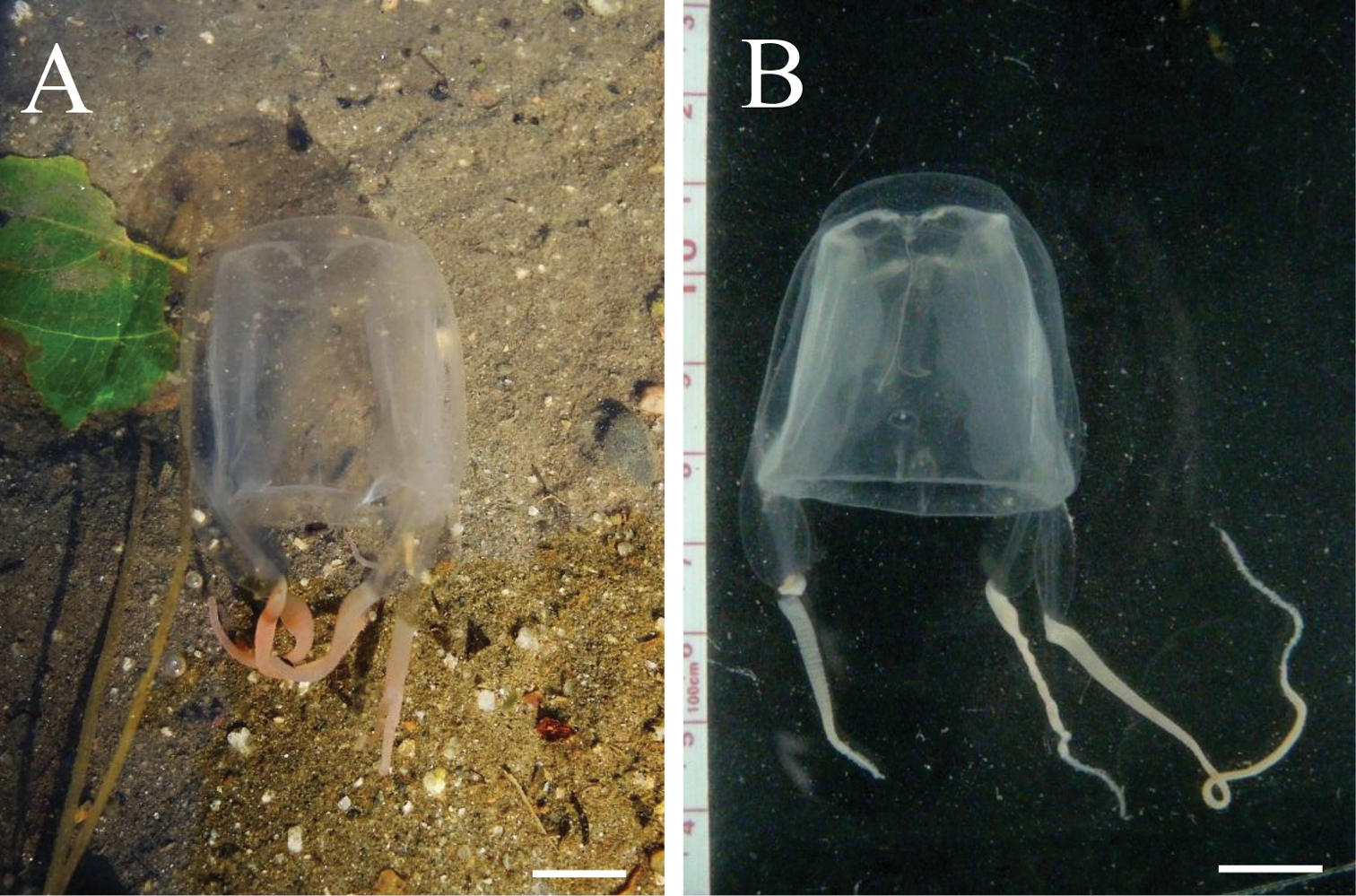
- Meteorona kishinouyei

Scientific classification
- Kingdom: Animalia
- Phylum: Cnidaria
- Class: Cubozoa
- Order: Chirodropida
- Family: Chiropsellidae; Toshino, Miyake & Shibata, 2015

Genera
- See text

= Chiropsellidae =

Family of jellyfishes

Chiropsellidae is a family of venomous box jellyfish within the class Cubozoa.

== Genera ==
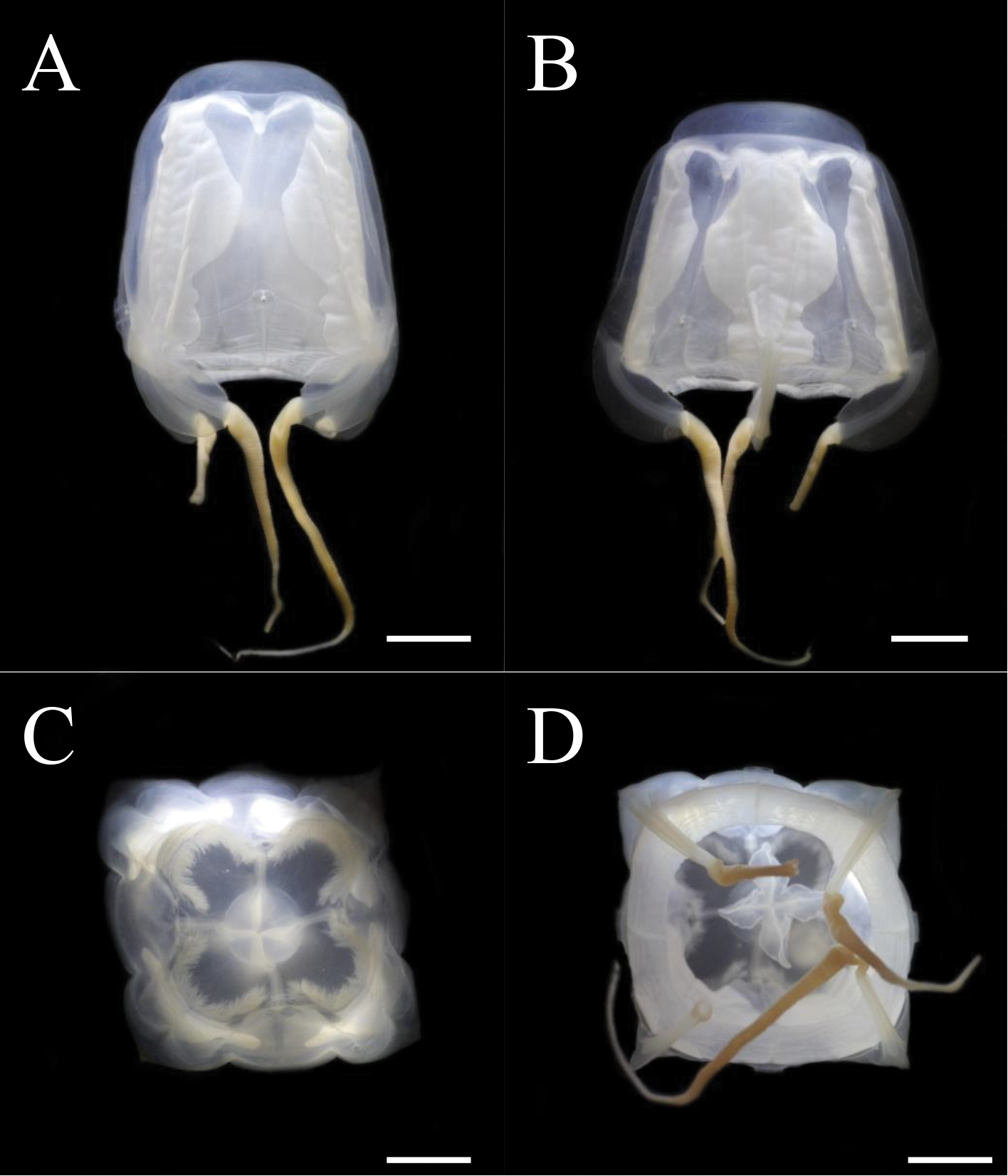
Meteorona kishinouyei

- Chiropsella Gershwin, 2006

- Chiropsella bart Gershwin & Alderslade, 2007
- Chiropsella bronzie Gershwin, 2006
- Chiropsella rudloei Bentlage, 2013
- Chiropsella saxoni Gershwin & Ekins, 2015

- Meteorona Toshino, Miyake & Shibata, 2015

- Meteorona kishinouyei Toshino, Miyake & Shibata, 2015
