= Dioithona oculata =

Scientific classification
- Kingdom: Animalia
- Phylum: Arthropoda
- Clade: Pancrustacea
- Class: Copepoda
- Order: Cyclopoida
- Family: Oithonidae
- Genus: Dioithona
- Species: D. oculata

Binomial name
- Dioithona oculata (Farran, 1913)

Synonyms
- Oithona oculata Farran, 1913

Species of crustacean

Dioithona oculata is a species of small crustacean, a marine copepod in the order Cyclopoida. It is native to the Indo-Pacific region but has spread to other parts of the world. It is a free-swimming epipelagic species found near the surface of the water. It was first described as Oithona oculata by the Irish zoologist George Philip Farran in 1913.

== Description ==
Free-living copepods have translucent bodies divided into a broad head, a thorax bearing swimming legs and a narrow, limbless abdomen. They have a major articulated joint between the front and rear portions where the body flexes ventrally. Male Dioithona oculata are 0.6 to 0.79 mm (0.024 to 0.031 in) long, with females being slightly larger at 0.62 to 0.9 mm (0.024 to 0.035 in). A distinguishing feature for this species is the structure of the lens of the eye.

== Distribution and habitat ==
Dioithona oculata is native to the Indo-Pacific region but has expanded its range into the Atlantic. Its range includes Madagascar, the Gulf of Oman, the Persian Gulf, lagoons in the Laccadives, Rodrigues, the Nicobar Islands, Christmas Island, the Strait of Malacca, the Yellow Sea, the East China Sea, Taiwan, South Korea, Japan, the Caroline Islands, the Palau Islands, the Great Barrier Reef, New Caledonia, the Samoa Islands, northern Chile and California. The Atlantic range includes the Cape of Good Hope in South Africa, Brazil, Colombia, Belize, the Caribbean, Jamaica and the Gulf of Mexico. It can form swarms, dense aggregations of individuals, and these have been observed in shallow water over sandy bottoms, above patches of algae in reef areas and over algae on rocky shores. They also form swarms in sunlit patches of water among mangrove roots at the edge of lagoons in the Caribbean where they have reached densities of 90 copepods per ml (0.034 fl oz).

== Behaviour ==
The swarming behaviour of these copepods has been studied among red mangroves in Belize. It was found that swarms only formed by day, with the individuals dispersing at night. Swarms were denser in June than in January and consisted of adults and late-stage larvae. In nearby open water younger larvae predominated during the day and swarming did not take place. In a current of up to 2 cm (0.8 in), the swarm maintains its position, usually in a position where a beam of sunlight penetrates the canopy. There is an energy cost in maintaining the swarm in a particular location and each individual faces greater competition for food which makes the adaptive value of this behaviour unclear. Swarming may provide greater breeding opportunities, reduce the chance of involuntary dispersal by the current and protect against predation. In fact, there are few planktivorous fish feeding on this copepod among the mangroves and the main predator is the medusa of the tiny box jellyfish Tripedalia cystophora.
