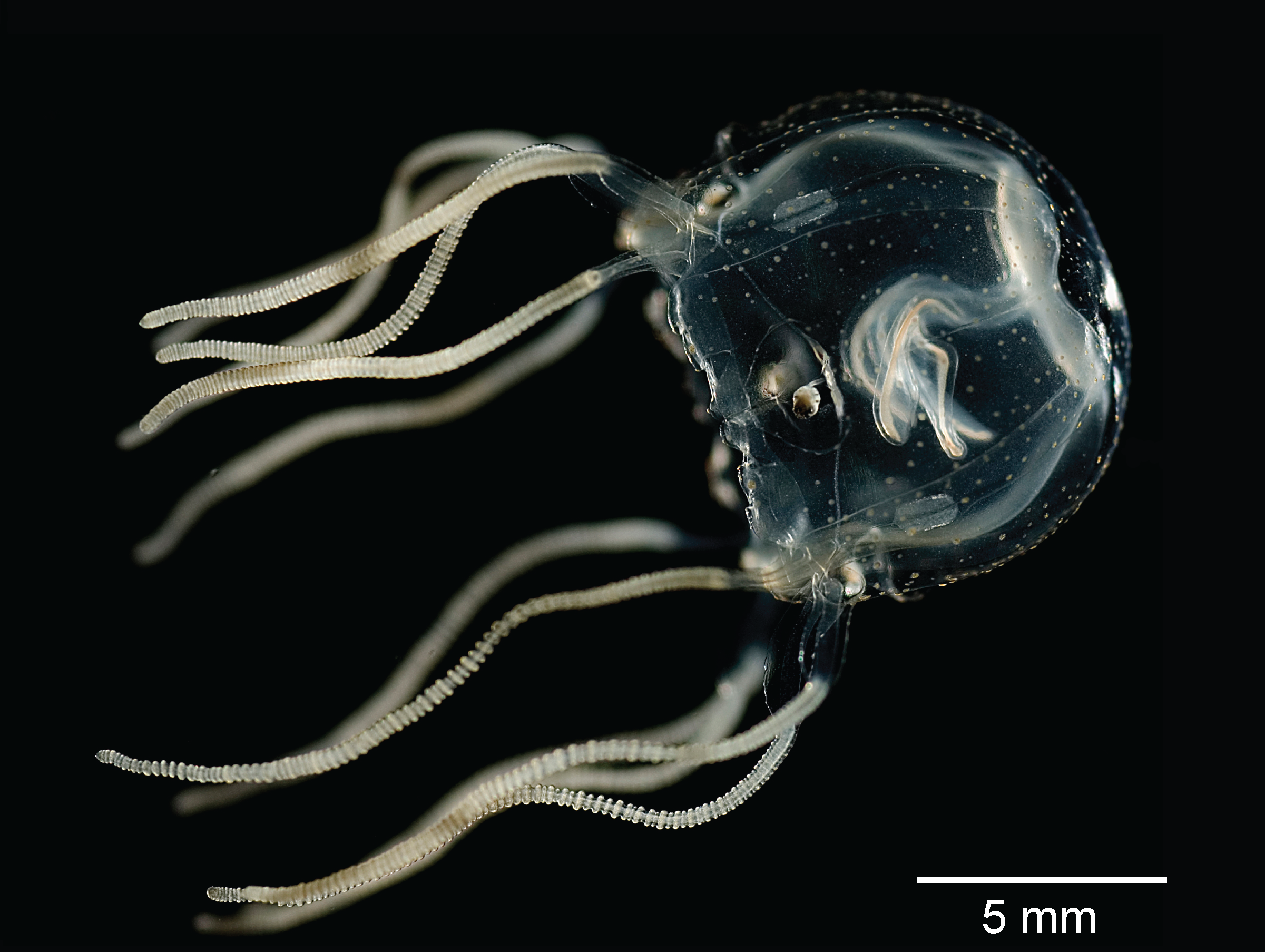
- Tripedalia cystophora

Scientific classification
- Kingdom: Animalia
- Phylum: Cnidaria
- Class: Cubozoa
- Order: Carybdeida
- Family: Tripedaliidae

Genera
- Copula; Tripedalia

= Tripedaliidae =

Family of jellyfishes

Tripedaliidae is a family of box jellyfish within class Cubozoa.

== Species ==
- Copula Bentlage, Cartwright, Yanagihara, Lewis, Richards & Collins, 2010
  - Copula sivickisi (Stiasny, 1926)
- Tripedalia Conant, 1897
  - Tripedalia binata Moore, 1988
  - Tripedalia cystophora Conant, 1897
  - Tripedalia maipoensis
