= Pranciškus Baltrus Šivickis =

Lithuanian zoologist (1882–1968)

Pranciškus Baltrus Šivickis (30 September 1882, Žalakiškiai, Raseiniai region – 10 October 1968, Vilnius) was a Lithuanian zoologist who completed his higher education in the United States. He served as Professor of Zoology at the University of the Philippines (Manila) from 1922 to 1928 and, after returning to Lithuania, taught at the University of Lithuania (from 1930 Vytautas Magnus University) and later at Vilnius University. He is regarded as a founder of experimental zoology and one of the initiators of ecological–faunistic studies of invertebrates in Lithuania; he was elected a full member of the Lithuanian Academy of Sciences (1941–1945; again from 1956).

== Early life and education ==
Šivickis was born in Žalakiškiai (Šiluva parish) in central Lithuania. He finished three years of schooling at the Russian-language primary school in Šiluva in 1900 and then worked on his father's farm. Involved in Lithuanian cultural life and the 1905 revolutionary events, he emigrated to the United States in 1906 to avoid arrest. While in the U.S. he held various jobs and studied in evening classes at several universities; he graduated from the Natural Sciences Department of the University of Chicago in 1920 and earned a doctorate in 1922 for work on regeneration in flatworms (planarians).

== University of the Philippines (1922–1928) ==
From 1922 to 1928 Šivickis was Professor of Zoology at the University of the Philippines in Manila, where he was active in teaching, organizing research, and conducting faunistic and hydrobiological studies.

== Return to Lithuania ==
Šivickis returned to Lithuania in 1928 and joined the Department of Zoology and Comparative Anatomy at the University of Lithuania in Kaunas (renamed Vytautas Magnus University in 1930). Later he moved to Vilnius University, where he served as professor and head of the Department of Histology and Embryology. With his students he published extensively on soil, aquatic and parasitic invertebrates, contributing to the development of ecological–faunistic research traditions in the country.

== Laboratory of Parasitology ==
In 1952 Šivickis initiated the first parasitology laboratory in Lithuania within the academic system; today the successor unit bears his name as the P. B. Šivickis Laboratory of Parasitology at the Nature Research Centre in Vilnius.

== Death ==
Šivickis died on 10 October 1968 in Vilnius and was buried in Antakalnis Cemetery.
