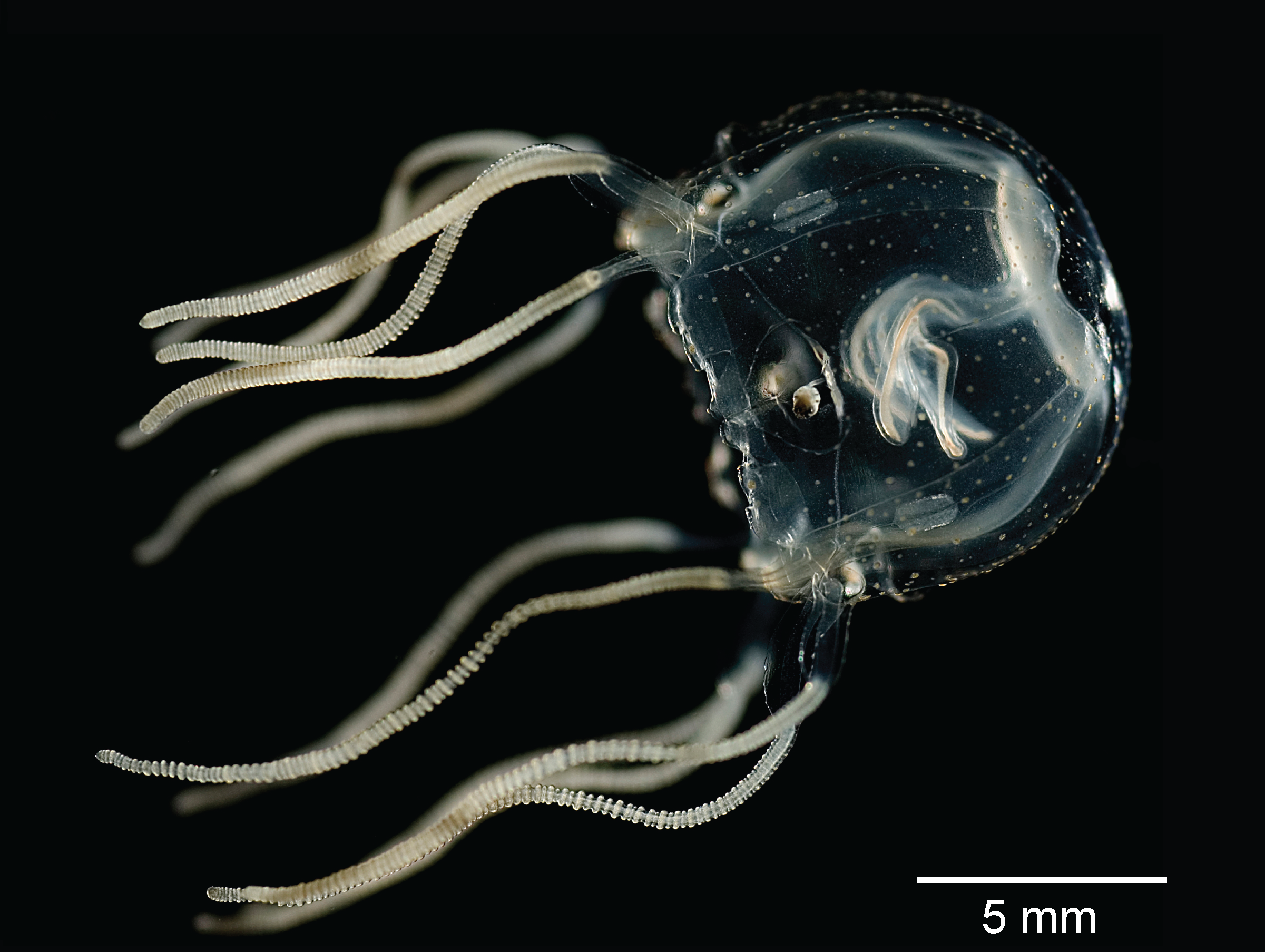

Scientific classification
- Kingdom: Animalia
- Phylum: Cnidaria
- Class: Cubozoa
- Order: Carybdeida
- Family: Tripedaliidae
- Genus: Tripedalia
- Species: T. cystophora

Binomial name
- Tripedalia cystophora Conant, 1897

= Tripedalia cystophora =

Species of jellyfish

Tripedalia cystophora is a small species of box jellyfish in the family Tripedaliidae. It is native to the Caribbean Sea and the Central Indo-Pacific.

== Description ==
The medusa of Tripedalia cystophora is about 1 cm (0.4 in) in diameter. It has a boxy dome-shaped bell, which has a flattened top and is slightly wider than it is high. From a single point on each of the four corners of the bell arise three tentacles, each on a pedalium or stalk. The outer surface of the bell is granulated with small wart-like structures armed with nematocysts. About a quarter way up the bell are four rhopalia, cylindrical structures containing light-sensitive cells. About halfway up the bell, the four flattened gonads can be seen on the inside of the bell. The underside of the bell is partially constricted by a velarium, a horizontal ring of tissue, and in the centre is a manubrium, a tube-like structure which hangs down with the mouth at its tip. This box jellyfish is a translucent yellowish-brown colour.

== Distribution and habitat ==
The World Register of Marine Species lists Coral Sea, the Caribbean Sea and the Central Indo-Pacific as habitats, but marks the latter two as unreviewed. Colonies of Tripedalia cystophora are found off the north coast of South America in the Atlantic Ocean. One colony in Puerto Rico, in the Caribbean Sea, was found inhabiting the margins of mangrove lagoons.

== Biology ==
Box jellyfish swim by expanding and contracting their bells vigorously. During the day Tripedalia cystophora is mostly to be found within 20 cm (8 in) of the surface, in sunlit positions among the prop roots of mangroves. These warm sunlit areas are where its main food item, the copepod Dioithona oculata, are to be found during the day. Dense swarms of these copepods form in the illuminated patches of water where shafts of sunlight shine through the mangrove canopy. Tripedalia cystophora forages by allowing itself to sink slowly towards the bottom with its tentacles spread out around it to snare its prey.

Box jellyfish have complex visual systems. Each of the four rhopalia on the bell of Tripedalia cystophora consists of a group of six eyes of four morphological types. The uppermost and the lowest eye each contains a lens, and there are also a pair of slit eyes and a pair of pit eyes. It has been found that Tripedalia cystophora displays complex behaviours such as the avoidance of obstacles and fast swimming in a particular direction and is able to maintain its position in the shaft of sunlit water presumably by using visual cues. The presence or absence of the copepod prey or the quantity present does not seem to affect its turning behaviour or swimming speed but by remaining in the sunlit water it maximises the number of copepods on which it can feed. It can detect a cylindrical object such as a root when it gets close enough to it and can then swerve sharply to one side to avoid it. The visual system of Tripedalia cystophora is attributed to its central nervous system. It is suggested that the nerves of the rhopalial nervous system, located in each rhopalium, may be responsible for the processing of visual information.

At night Tripedalia cystophora moves away from the mangroves a few metres further into the shallow lagoon and sinks to the bottom. It is not clear whether it settles on the bed of the lagoon or whether it swims slowly about among the seagrasses and green algae. This is because when an investigator shines a light to observe it, it reacts by rising towards the surface. Each individual medusa of Tripedalia cystophora is gonochoristic (either male or female) and produces gametes. After fertilisation, the zygote develops into a planula larva which is brooded by the female inside the bell. It is later expelled and settles to the bottom where it undergoes metamorphosis into a polyp about 1 mm (0.04 in) long with four, knob-tipped tentacles surrounding a mouth. This may produce further polyps by budding and these creep across the substrate before attaching themselves. The oral end of each polyp later differentiates into a proto-medusa which detaches itself from the base of the polyp to become a juvenile medusa and complete the life cycle.
