= Rhopalium =

Sensory structures of some jellyfish species

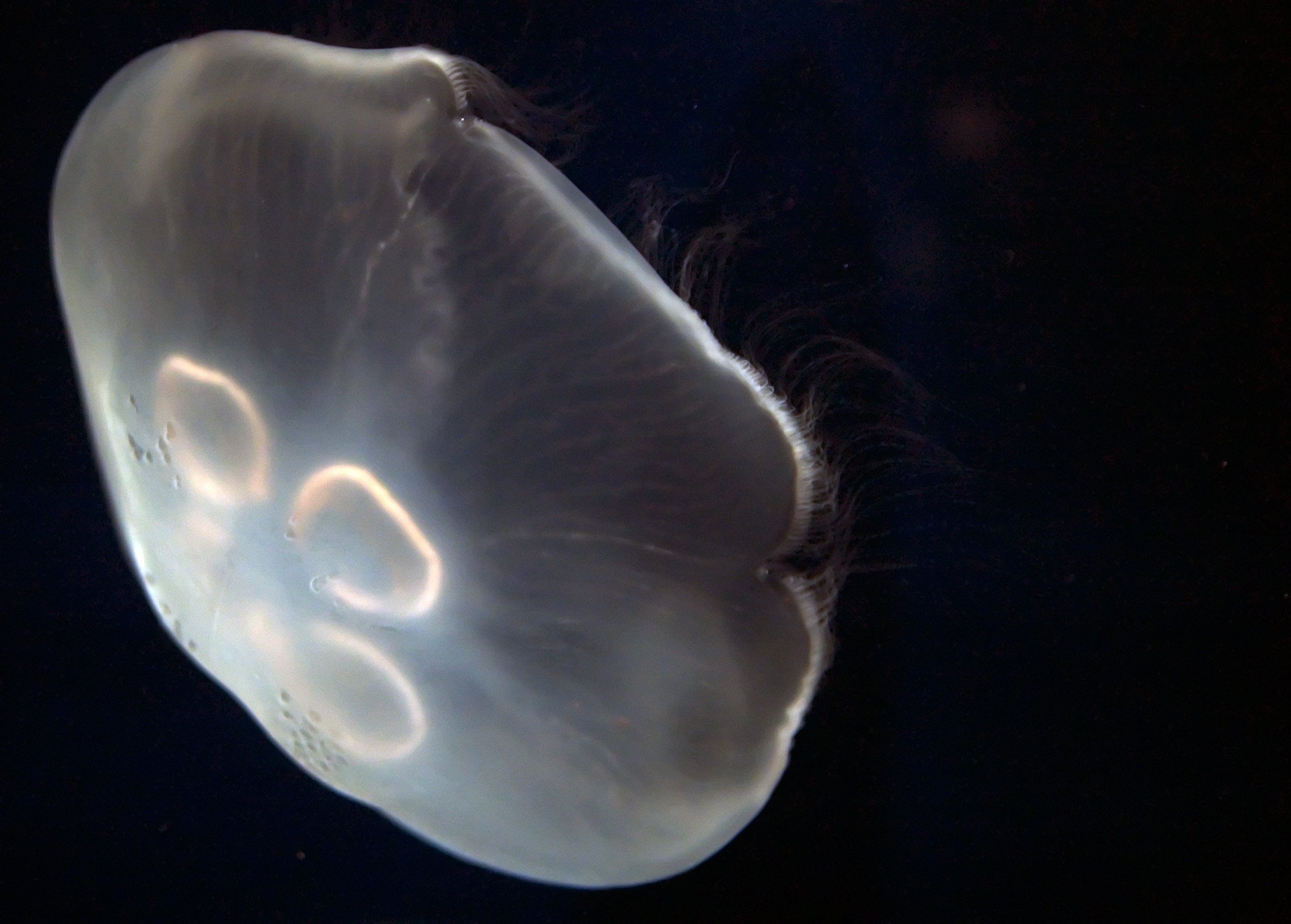
Moon jellyfish (Aurelia aurita), with rhopalia visible in indentations of the bell's rim

Rhopalia (sing. rhopalium; from Ancient Greek ῥόπαλον (rhópalon) 'club, mace') are small sensory organs of certain Scyphozoan (true jellyfish) and Cubozoan (box jellyfish) species.

== Description ==
The structures typically occur in multiples of four, are bell shaped and face outward from invaginations around the bell of the jelly's mantle. They are each connected ectodermally to the periphery of other rhopalia by stalk-like projections which join extremities in a skirt-like shape. These connections form the junctions of the cnidarian 'central nervous system', which synapse within the rhopalial centers. Rhopalia vary in form, size and number, but ubiquitously consist of specialized structures to sense light (ocelli), which line the structure, and regions to perceive gravity (statoliths) at their terminal tip. Rhopalia are unique to the medusoid forms of cnidarians and are best studied in Scyphozoa, within the genus Aurelia, which exhibits the most typical arrangement and structure of rhopalia in marginal indentations around the skirt of the bell which are flanked by rhopalial lappets. However, studies about the organ in Cubozoa, which exhibit the most complex rhopalial structure and visual sensory mechanisms, have been few, but are coming to reveal more detail about the mechanisms and origins of these structures. Sensory input from rhopalia are not only crucial for Cnidaria to sense light and spatial orientation, but help to gauge and control the pace of swimming and muscle contraction. Continuing to increase the breadth and depth of scientific knowledge about the origins of rhopalia and how they manifest during the process of metamorphosis is crucial to understanding sensory evolution in all metazoa, and could contribute to the progression of knowledge about the beginnings of nervous system evolution.

== Morphology and function ==
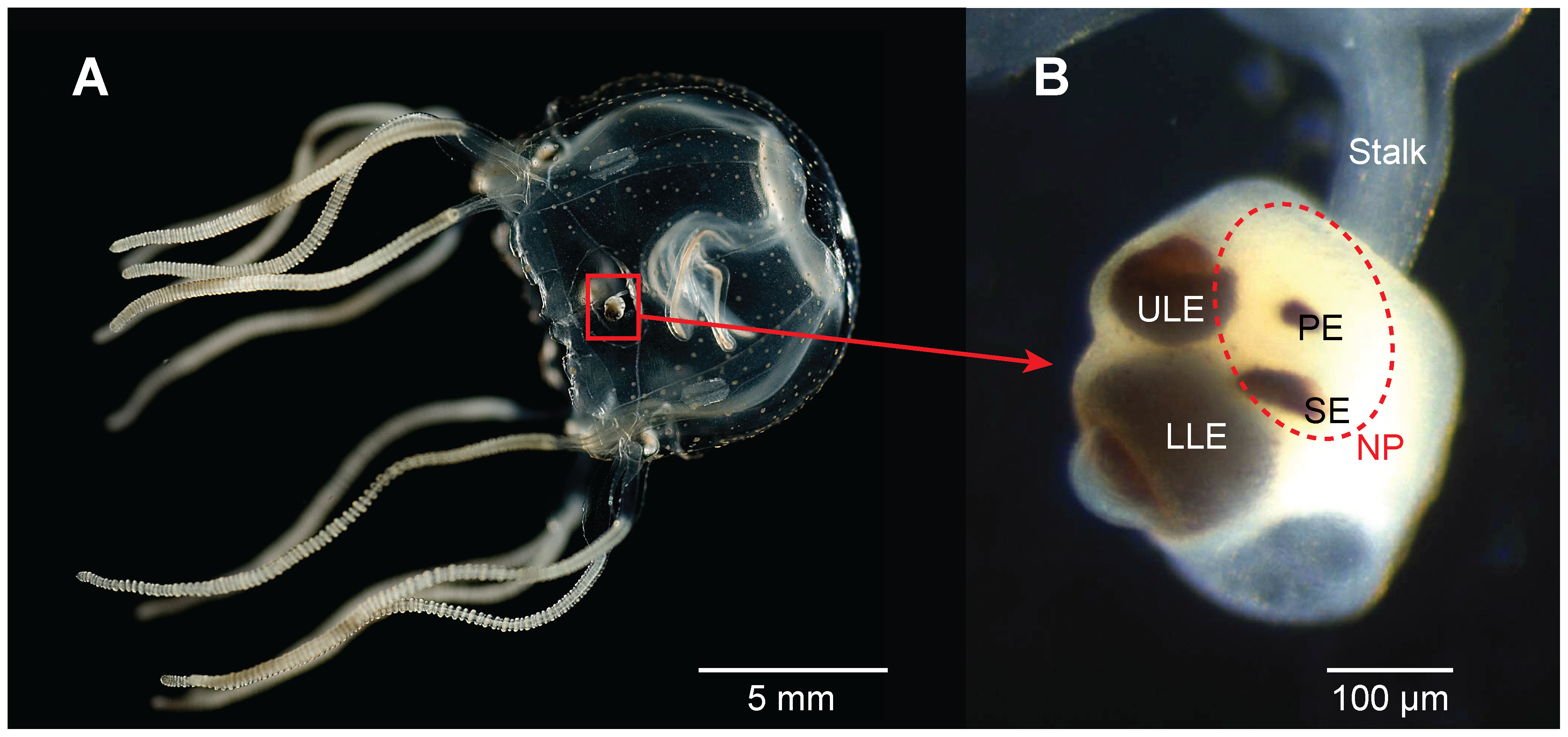
Figure: "Cubozoan visual system: The visual system of the cubozoan Tripedalia cystophora (A) comprises four sensory structures called rhopalia (B). Each rhopalium carries six eyes of four morphological types (lower lens eye LLE, upper lens eye ULE, pit eye PE and slit eye SE) and a light sensitive neuropil (NP, red broken line). The eyes are responsible for the image formation in the animal and the light sensitive neuropil is thought to be involved in diurnal activity".

Studies observing the genus Aurelia indicate that development of their rhopalial nervous system occurs in an organized, staged manner beginning in the strobila phase and results in bilaterally symmetrical organization of the organs and the stalk-like projections that connect them inwardly. Rhopalia uniformly manifest in multiples of four, regardless of their variations in morphology among the species that possess them. Each rhopalium is capped by a lithocyst, or statocyst, at the terminal end, which is known to sense gravitational change and orientation. On the oral side of the rhopalium near the lithocyst is a mass of sensory cells called the "pigment-cup ocellus", while on the aboral side, there is a “pigment-spot ocellus” just proximal to the lithocyst, formed by a patch of pigment cells. In tandem with a “touch plate” which is situated near the spot-ocellus, tilt and gravity during the jellies' movements pulls downward on the dense lithocyst, which bends the entire rhopalial body such that the cells of the touch plate are either distant from or making contact with the lithocyst hood; this physical mechanism is how the rhopalia deduct sensory information into gravity-sensate behavioral responses

As cnidarians lack centralized ganglia and cephalization, the centralization of sensory mechanisms divided up among connections within the rhopalial centers is the nearest concept to a brain that we can place within the phylum. While rhopalia are minute and separated by number and distance across the body, they are extraordinary in the variability of sensory cells they possess in such small areas of tissue. The RNS (rhopalial nervous system) consists of roughly 1000 neurons, excluding photoreceptive cells, and possesses a neuropil, a tightly bundled cluster of cells at its center, serving as the junctions of synapse between adjacent rhopalia. In its totality, the rhopalial nervous system is involved in deduction of the sensation of light (the complexity of which approaches visual processing in some species) and in spatial-behavioral control; because the sensory cells of both sight and physical touch are located within such proximity, studies have explored how related and potentially integral these two mechanisms are to one another in terms of cnidarian behavior. It has thus been observed that the rate of muscle contraction and swimming speed increases when adult Aurelia medusae are exposed to higher levels of light. Additionally that this positive phototactic behavior is absent when the same conditions are presented to jellies whose pigment-cup ocelli have removed (but not the spot-ocellus), insinuating that the pigment-cup ocellus on the oral side is primarily photosensory yet intrinsically related to normal functional behavior

In recent years, it has been found that rhopalia retain a sizable reservoir of undifferentiated, stem-like cells, which are thought to be poised for potential use in both cell turnover and regeneration in the rhopalia.

== Formation during metamorphosis ==
Rhopalia are exclusive to the medusoid form of the cnidarian life cycle; young jellies within the classes Schyphozoa and Cubozoa develop through their planula larval and polyp stages lacking these structures. This indicates not only that jellies must employ different sensory mechanisms than those offered by rhopalia before entering the medusa stage, but that the formation of these complex structures takes place completely within the stages of adult strobilation and not during gastrulation. In most schyphozoa and cubozoa, sessile polyps undergo a secondary round of metamorphosis in order to become free-swimming, sexually mature medusae, generally entailing a process known as strobilation. During strobliation, a single polyp, which is now dubbed a Strobila, is set to undergo a process of transverse fission, which will result in the generation of one or multiple juvenile medusae, consequently referred to as ephyrae. Each free-swimming ephyra (singular) develops into an adult medusa, which has come to possess a rhopalial nervous system that it did not previously possess.

When the process of strobilation is at its genesis, before rhopalia begin their formation, small swellings manifest at the bases of specific tentacles in the polyp; these will become the sites of rhopalial development. The tentacles degenerate in length, and the margins of the swellings bulge out to form “rhopalar arms”. The rhopalial arm's distal end, formations called lappets begin to form, which are used for sensing and consuming food. Before ephyrae detach from the strobila, electrical impulses from the rhopalia have been observed in direct correspondence with pulsatile contractions of movement that begin when the ephyrae are becoming ready to be free-swimmers. This suggests that the sum of the connections that synapse within the rhopalia, along with the swimming musculature, all develop during the strobila stage. Observations point to the conclusion that the gravity-sensing portion of the organ consisting of the lithocyst and the touch plate most likely develops first, preceding the neuropil cluster within the center of the rhopalia, and then finally the ocelli, which exhibit the highest degree of cellular complexity and require the most energy to develop.

== Phylogenetic variations/manifestations in Cubozoa ==
Cubozoa rhoplaial structures and ocelli are the most complex of Cnidarians, and resemble the image-forming eyes of squids, octopuses and vertebrates. They possess rhopalia that are structurally similar to those of the scyphozoans, but the variation of cell types and specifically ocelli are more complex within Cubozoa. Cubozoan rhopalia also occur in multiples of four, where at least one rhopalia is embedded within the skirt of each side of the box jelly. Each rhopalial organ is lined with six total eyes of four varying morphological types. On each, there are two lens eyes, the upper and lower eye, accompanied by two different pairs of simpler pigment-pit eyes, summing to a total of 24 eyes per organism.

== Rhopalial ocelli and regeneration ==
Ocelli (the plural of ocellus) are a type of simple eye, or eyespot. They are photoreceptive, but very simple; differing from complex eyes with compound lenses, ocelli cannot morph the sensation of light into a complete image, and are utilized to sense movement and the absence and presence of light. Cnidarians are the most primitive extant animals that possess these simple eyespots; however, they exhibit an extremely wide range of phototactic behavior that ranges in complexity alongside the variation in ocelli. Cubozoa rhoplaial structures and their various types of ocelli are the most complex within the Cnidarian phyla, and resemble the advanced image-forming eyes of squids, octopuses and vertebrates.

It has been observed that the removal of some of the rhopalia in the species Aurelia results in a period of two weeks to complete regrowth, with only subtle loss of size and pigmentation but virtually identical function. Even the organ's ocelli, of both types, are capable of being fully regenerated as long as at least two rhopalia are left intact prior to amputation of the others. This exhibits that parts of the nervous system that would be considered precious and vital by most other living things can be regenerated in scyphozoan medusae. However, this has not been tested in cubozoans, which have the most elaborate nervous systems within Cnidaria, specifically concerning their visual capacities.

Swing of the rhopalia of Tripedalia cystophora

== See also ==
- Nerve net
