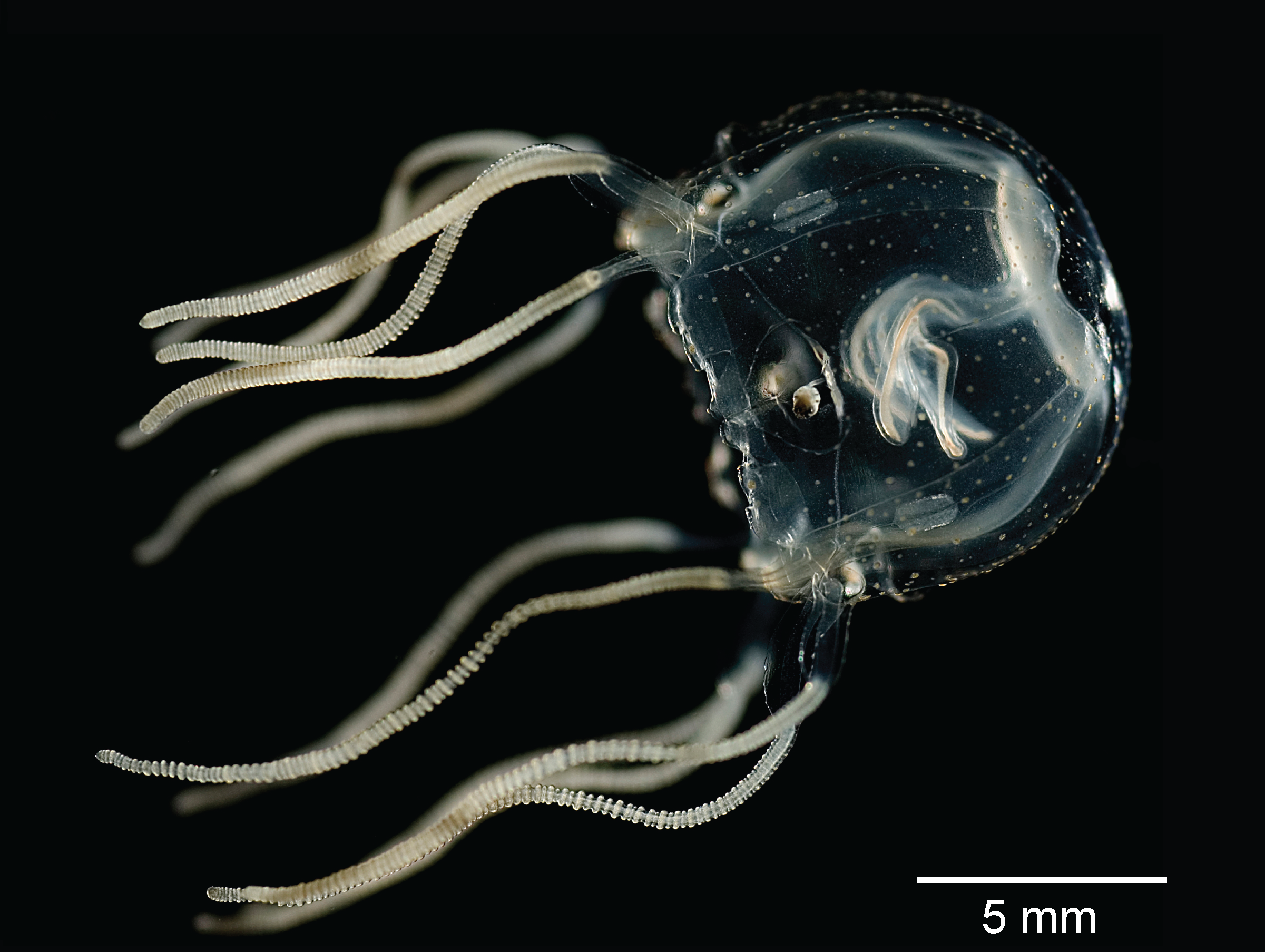
- Tripedalia cystophora

Scientific classification
- Kingdom: Animalia
- Phylum: Cnidaria
- Class: Cubozoa
- Order: Carybdeida; Gegenbaur, 1857

Families
- Alatinidae; Carukiidae; Carybdeidae; Tamoyidae; Tripedaliidae

Synonyms
- Cubomedusae Haeckel, 1880

= Carybdeida =

Order of jellyfishes

Carybdeida is an order of box jellyfish. It contains five families. They are distinguished from other box jellyfish by possessing unbranched muscular bases at the corners of the cubic umbrella. Most species have four tentacles.
