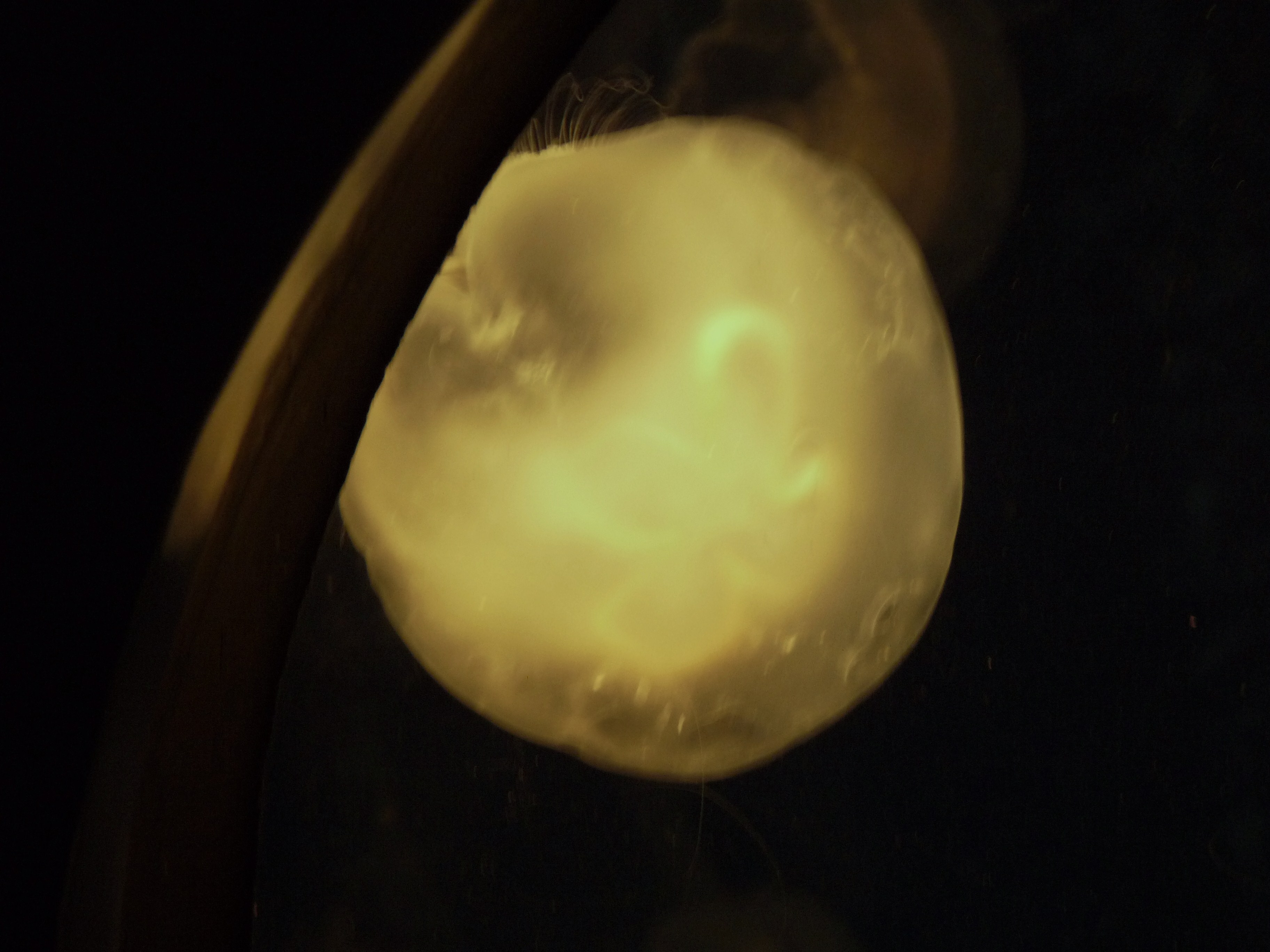

Scientific classification
- Kingdom: Animalia
- Phylum: Cnidaria
- Class: Scyphozoa
- Order: Semaeostomeae
- Family: Ulmaridae
- Genus: Aurelia
- Species: A. limbata

Binomial name
- Aurelia limbata Brandt, 1835

= Aurelia limbata =

Species of jellyfish

Aurelia limbata, the brown-banded moon jelly, is a type of moon jelly that occurs in various places throughout the Pacific Ocean.

== Taxonomy ==
Aurelia limbata is in the genus Aurelia, which is commonly called moon jellies. Aurelia is the most common and widely distributed species of jellyfish. A. aurita is the closest relative to A. limbata, because they have a similar gene orientation and the same life cycle.

== Description ==
Brown moon jellies have eight rhopalia (sensory structures) and numerous thin and long tentacles. Their bell, or body, is 25–30 centimetres (9.8–11.8 in) in diameter. A. limbata has a cup-like calyx. Most of the female A. limbata observed have golden yellow planulae located in brood pouches on their oral arms.

=== Similar species ===
A. limbata was previously identified as Aurelia aurita, but it is currently considered its own species. They can be differentiated from A. aurita by the facts that A. limbata are larger, have a 16-scalloped umbrella, and are of chocolate brown color. Additionally, A. limbata, a polar species, has mostly been found in Asian Pacific waters and close to Alaska, whereas A. aurita is common in nearshore waters.

A. limbata may be a color morph of its cousin Aurelia labiata.

== Habitat and distribution ==
A. limbata can be found near Korea, Japan, Sea of Okhotsk, Alaska, and the Bering Sea. This species of moon jelly prefers cold waters and is an epipelagic species, preferring polar seas below 70°N. Usually, species of the genus Aurelia are not found in deeper waters, but the brown-banded jelly prefers deeper waters and are highly active in them. Aurelia typically performs vertical migrations at dusk.

A. limbata medusae (motile, reproductive stage of development) have been observed in the benthopelagic layer, where they can be collected with a bottom trawl net and where they tend to aggregate from spring to fall.

== Behaviour ==
A. limbata swims against the current with an obliquely upward direction of its aboral surface; individuals swim vigorously with strong bell contractions. A. limbata have temperature-dependent metabolisms. A. limbata can be manipulated and ingested by ophiuroids (big group of echinoderms).

=== Diet ===
Brown-banded moon jellies predate upon Larval decapods.

=== Reproduction ===
Not much is known about their reproductive behaviour due to their occurrence at such deep depths, but they are known to reproduce asexually. Strobilation can be induced by a period of low temperatures, and they strobilate throughout the year in low temperatures.
