= Aurelia rara =

Scientific classification
- Kingdom: Animalia
- Phylum: Cnidaria
- Class: Scyphozoa
- Order: Semaeostomeae
- Family: Ulmaridae
- Genus: Aurelia
- Species: A. rara

Binomial name
- Aurelia rara Lawley, Gamero-Mora, Maronna, Chiaverano, Stampar, Hopcroft, Collins & Morandini, 2021

Species of jellyfish

Aurelia rara is a species of true jellyfish in the family Ulmaridae. It is known from type specimens found near Dauphin Island.

== Etymology ==
The genus name is derived from the Latin name Aurelia, which in turn is derived from aureus, meaning "golden". The specific epithet derives from the Latin rarus, meaning "rare" or "uncommon", due to A. rara being more elusive in comparison to the other two Aurelia species in the type locality, A. montyi and A. marginalis.
