= Aurelia hyalina =

Scientific classification
- Kingdom: Animalia
- Phylum: Cnidaria
- Class: Scyphozoa
- Order: Semaeostomeae
- Family: Ulmaridae
- Genus: Aurelia
- Species: A. hyalina

Binomial name
- Aurelia hyalina Brandt, 1835

Species of jellyfish

Aurelia hyalina is a species of true jellyfish belonging to the family Ulmaridae. It was formerly considered conspecific with Aurelia limbata.

== Etymology ==
The generic name is derived from the Latin feminine name Aurelia, which in turn is derived from aurum, meaning "gold". The specific epithet is derived from the Latin hyalinus, meaning "glassy".

== Distribution ==
The type locality of the species was the Aleutian Islands. Aurelia hyalina has additionally been found elsewhere in the northeastern Pacific Ocean, including around northeastern Russia, northeastern Canada, Greenland, and elsewhere around southwestern Alaska.
