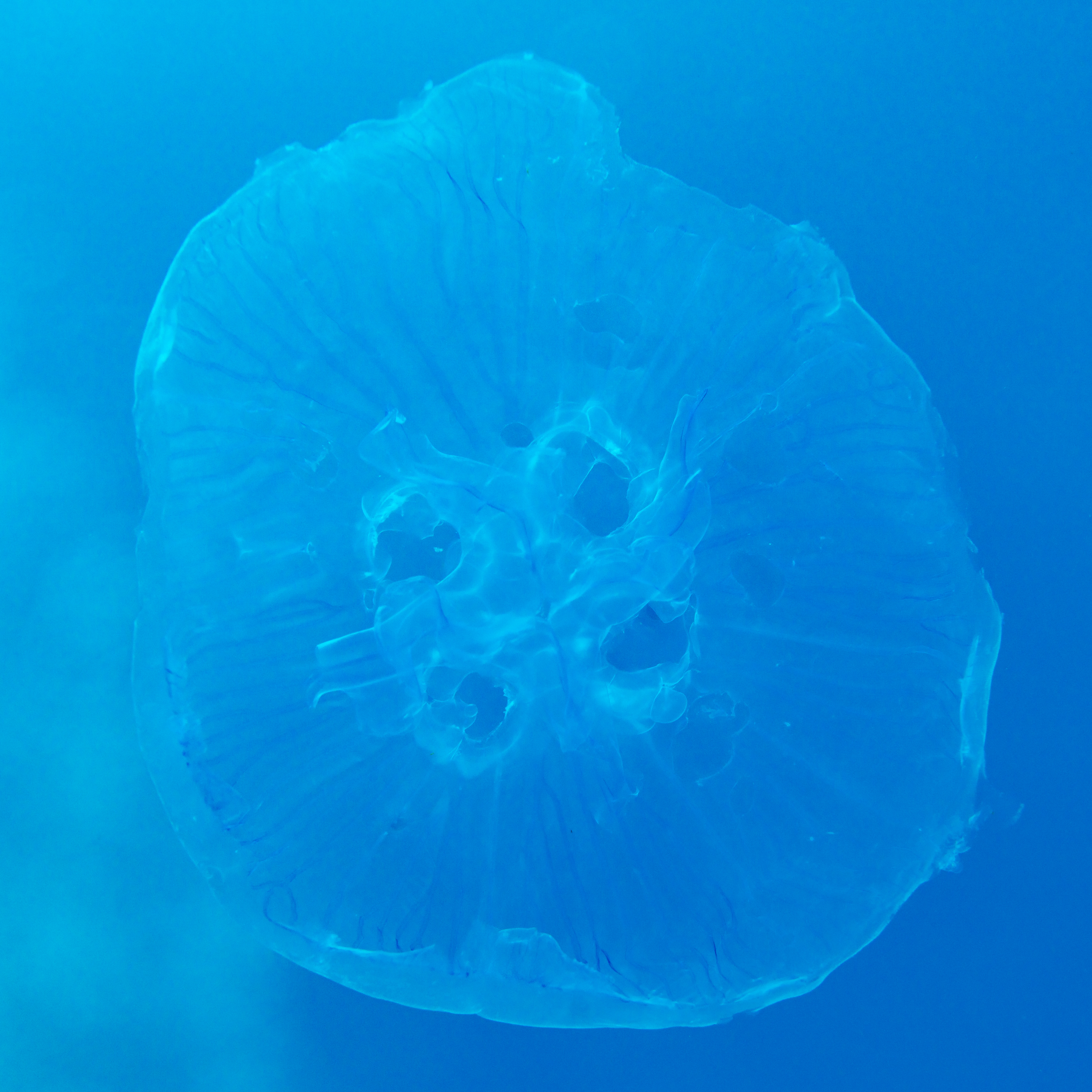

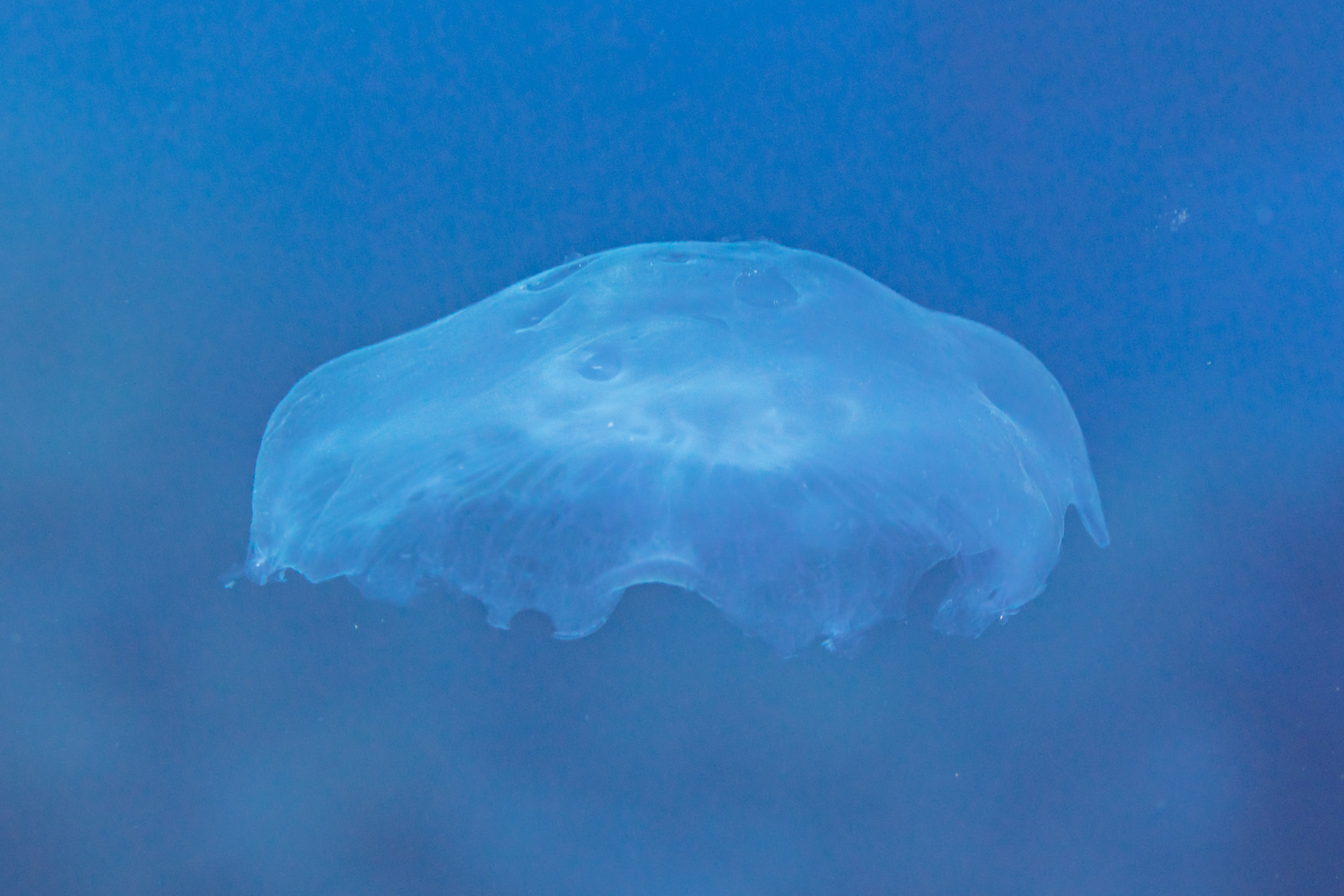

Scientific classification
- Kingdom: Animalia
- Phylum: Cnidaria
- Class: Scyphozoa
- Order: Semaeostomeae
- Family: Ulmaridae
- Genus: Aurelia
- Species: A. coerulea

Binomial name
- Aurelia coerulea von Lendenfeld, 1884

Synonyms
- Aurelia japonica Kishinouye, 1891

= Aurelia coerulea =

Species of jellyfish

Aurelia coerulea or Asian moon jelly is a species of moon jelly in the genus Aurelia. This species is native to the seas off Japan, China, Korea, and California, as well as the Mediterranean and other temperate seas. It has been found in California, Australia, France, and Wales, as a introduced species. It is particularly abundant in artificial habitats and sheltered regions. It has a very high reproductive rate which can cause blooming events. A.coerulea blooming causes problems such as impairing fisheries, clogging the nuclear power plants and disrupting the local zooplankton abundance. The chemical compounds the species secretes as a self-defense mechanism can be used for pharmaceutical purposes.

== Habitat ==
A.coerulea are mainly distributed in culture ponds, artificial reefs, lagoons, marinas, and other cold and shady artificial constructions for settlement and proliferation. They are weak swimmers so those structures can protect the polyps from being washed away. Hypoxia in coastal waters induces stress and disrupts life cycles of the benthic organisms, but A.coerulea polyps are more tolerant than some other competitors under low dissolved oxygen level, so their population increase while others left due to stress. A.coerulea like ambient temperature, disrupted temperature and salinity will bring detrimental effects to them.

== Blooming ==
It has been reported that blooming of the A.coerulea medusae clogged cooling water intakes and increased shut down frequency of nuclear power plants. Also, blooming occur in eutrophic embayments disrupts the local zooplankton abundance. Planktonic ciliates are abundant in eutrophic embayments, the A.coerulea polyp and ephyra actively devour and assimilate ciliates until medusa stage, medusa then prey on mesozooplankton and macrozooplankton. The ephyra can tolerate long period of starvation and grow to medusa in spring with better food conditions. The high abundance of medusae decreases mesozooplankton and macrozooplankton but increases microzooplankton population, which will later become the food source for A.coerulea polyps, resulting in another bloom as a cycle.

== Life cycle ==
A.coerulea has two life cycles, the metagenetic life cycle and direct development life cycle, it can alternate life cycle strategies based on environmental conditions.

In metagenetic life cycle, the A.coerulea planula turns into polyp then attach to substrates for up to half a year till strobilation. Under warm condition, the polyps will reproduce asexually, under cold condition, the polyps will grow then strobilate. Some disadvantages of this life cycle is that the polyps have to compete for space and beware of predation.

In direct development life cycle, A.coerulea planula turns into ephyra, ephyra stage has longer longevity and higher chance to find substrates to settle down. While this stage has low mortality but their population growth is lower as compared to the other life cycle.

== Potential uses ==
A.coerulea lives in bacteria rich habitat, it secretes phenolic compound, which is known for its antioxidant property in nature. Also it has been reported that it shows lysozyme-like activity in its oral arms, umbrella tissues and mucus. Those unique mechanisms can be contributing to their self-defense system against bacteria. Extraction of those compounds can be used for biotechnological and pharmaceutical purposes.
