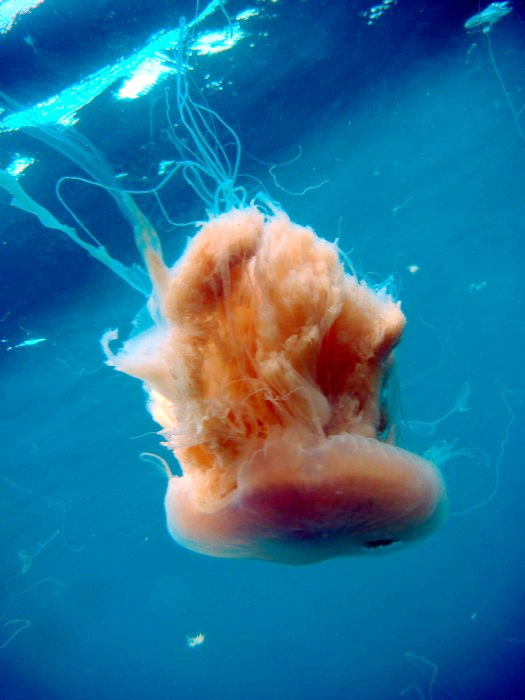

Scientific classification
- Kingdom: Animalia
- Phylum: Cnidaria
- Class: Scyphozoa
- Order: Semaeostomeae
- Family: Drymonematidae
- Genus: Drymonema
- Species: D. larsoni

Binomial name
- Drymonema larsoni Bayha & Dawson, 2010

= Drymonema larsoni =

Species of jellyfish

Drymonema larsoni, known as the pink meanie, is a species of jellyfish belonging to the class Scyphozoa (true jellyfish). Following a mass sighting in 2000 in the Gulf of Mexico, the species and the rest of its genus were classified as their own family (Drymonematidae), a new subset of Scyphozoa. They were originally thought to be a member of the same family as the lion's mane jellyfish, Cyanea capillata, but they were shown to have morphological and molecular differences. Drymonema larsoni prey heavily upon jellyfish species belonging to the genus Aurelia, and they play an important role in controlling the population of these species.

Drymonema larsoni is notable for its large size, with a bell up to 70 cm (2.3 ft) in diameter and extensive, elaborate oral arms and tentacles that extend 25 to 30 m (80 to 100 ft). These structures are key adaptations for predation, as tentacles create a large "fishing volume" to capture prey while oral arms trap and digest multiple items simultaneously. Larger individuals (those with a bell diameter greater than 100 mm (3.9 in)) are near-obligate predators of Aurelia spp., though smaller individuals primarily feed on zooplankton.
