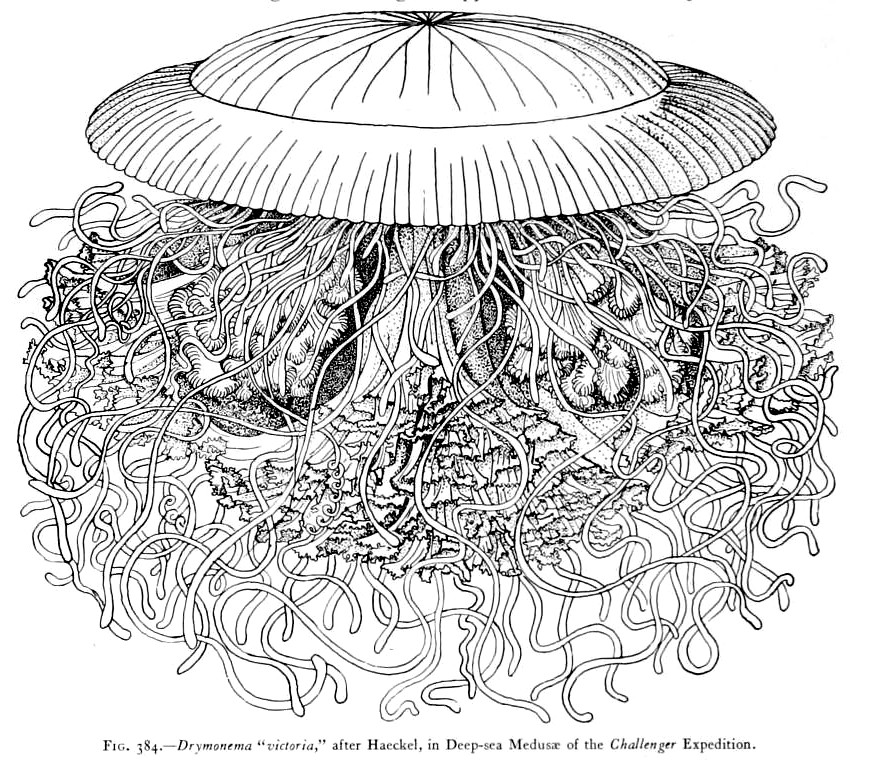

Scientific classification
- Kingdom: Animalia
- Phylum: Cnidaria
- Class: Scyphozoa
- Order: Semaeostomeae
- Family: Drymonematidae
- Genus: Drymonema
- Species: D. dalmatinum

Binomial name
- Drymonema dalmatinum (Haeckel, 1882)

= Drymonema dalmatinum =

Species of large jellyfish

Drymonema dalmatinum is a species of scyphozoan jellyfish also known as the dalmatian mane jelly, the cauliflower jellyfish, or, in the United States, the pink meanie.

== Description ==
Drymonema dalmatinum is a large species, growing up to 75 centimetres (30 in) long and weighing up to 25 kilograms (55 lb). The oral arms are very large, making up around fifty percent of the jellyfish's weight. The bell – the umbrella-like part that forms the body of the jellyfish – may grow up to 1 metre (3.3 feet) across.
