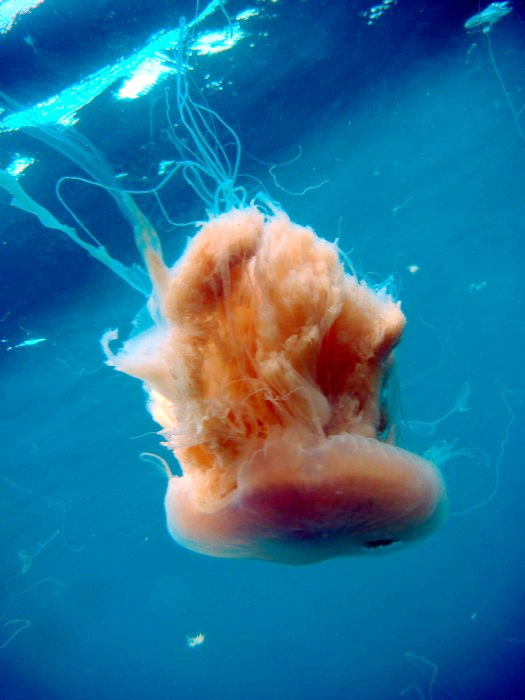

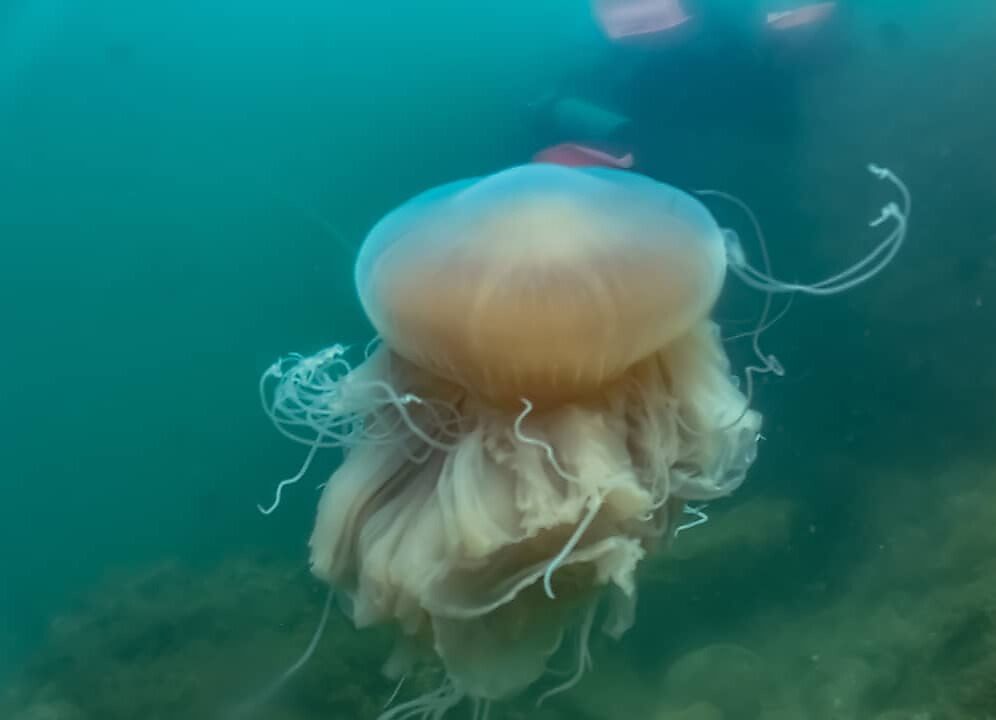
- Drymonema gorgo

Scientific classification
- Kingdom: Animalia
- Phylum: Cnidaria
- Class: Scyphozoa
- Order: Semaeostomeae
- Family: Drymonematidae; Bayha & Dawson, 2010
- Genus: Drymonema; Haeckel, 1880

= Drymonema =

Genus of jellyfishes

Drymonema is a genus of true jellyfish, placed in its own family, the Drymonematidae. There are three species: Drymonema dalmatinum, Drymonema gorgo, and Drymonema larsoni, which are found in the Gulf of Mexico, Atlantic Ocean and Mediterranean Sea.

== Classification ==
Drymonema was described as a distinct family based on DNA evidence and morphological analysis, in 2011. The first species described, D. larsoni, was named after the scientist Ronald G. Larson who pioneered work on the species in the 1980s. The new family Drymonematidae was the first new addition of true jellyfish (scyphozoans) described since 1921.

== Species ==
- Drymonema dalmatinum Haeckel, 1880
- Drymonema gorgo F. Müller, 1883
- Drymonema larsoni Bayha & Dawson, 2010

=== Drymonema larsoni "Pink Meanie" ===
Drymonema larsoni is a species that forms large, dangerous blooms in the northern area of the Gulf of Mexico. Drymonema larsoni get their name "pink meanie" from their predation and eating habits. The pink meanies were found to feed on the moon jellyfish (Aurelia sp.) in the northern section of the Gulf of Mexico.

=== Drymonema dalmatinum "Stinging cauliflower" ===
Drymonema dalmatinum is found in the central part of the Atlantic Ocean and along the Mediterranean Sea. The stinging cauliflower is a pale pink to golden brown coloration with a large number of clear tentacles, along with long/thin oral arms. Like the pinke meanie, Drymonema dalmatinum also feeds on species of moon jellyfish such as Aurelia sp.

=== Drymonema gorgo ===
Drymonema gorgo is found in the western South Atlantic.

== Morphology ==
The morphology of Drymonema is defined by:

- Allometric growth of the bell margin.
- Ring shaped zone of tentacles.
- Loss of gastric filaments with the development/ontogeny of an organism.

== Reproduction ==
The reproduction of the genus Drymonema is similar to the reproduction of all Scyphozoans. These organisms can undergo both sexual (medusa) and asexual (polyp) reproduction processes. In the case of a medusa, sexual reproduction is external, where the males release the sperm while the females release eggs into the water and they fuse. This fusion results in free swimming planula larva that eventually sinks to the bottom or finds a hard surface to attach to. Once attached the planula larva starts metamorphosis and becomes a polyp. This polyp will reproduce asexually, most commonly using budding, and producing ephyrae which mature into a medusa to begin the life cycle process over again. Scyphozoans and Drymonema species alternate between sexual and asexual reproduction stages.

== Feeding ==
- Translucent tentacles used for grasping and feeding.
- Drymonema species eat an abundant amount of moon jellyfish (Aurelia sp.)
- Food ingested and waste excreted must come out of the same opening, (no digestive tract).
