= Aurelia relicta =

Scientific classification
- Kingdom: Animalia
- Phylum: Cnidaria
- Class: Scyphozoa
- Order: Semaeostomeae
- Family: Ulmaridae
- Genus: Aurelia
- Species: A. relicta

Binomial name
- Aurelia relicta Scorrano, Aglieri, Boero, Dawson & Piraino, 2016

Species of jellyfish

Aurelia relicta is a species of true jellyfish in the family Ulmaridae. It is known from type specimens found in the Adriatic Sea off Mljet.

== Etymology ==
The genus name is derived from the Latin name Aurelia, which in turn is derived from aureus, meaning "golden". The specific epithet is derived from the Latin relictus, meaning "abandoned, forsaken", which refers to the "'relict' geographic isolation of the species".
