= Aurelia columbia =

Scientific classification
- Kingdom: Animalia
- Phylum: Cnidaria
- Class: Scyphozoa
- Order: Semaeostomeae
- Family: Ulmaridae
- Genus: Aurelia
- Species: A. columbia

Binomial name
- Aurelia columbia Lawley, Gamero-Mora, Maronna, Chiaverano, Stampar, Hopcroft, Collins & Morandini, 2021

Species of jellyfish

Aurelia columbia is a species of true jellyfish in the family Ulmaridae. It is known via type specimens found in waters off the coasts of the Northwestern United States and British Columbia.

== Etymology ==
The genus name is derived from the Latin name Aurelia, which in turn is derived from aureus, meaning "golden". The specific epithet is taken from British Columbia, where the majority of sequenced specimens for the species were originally collected.
