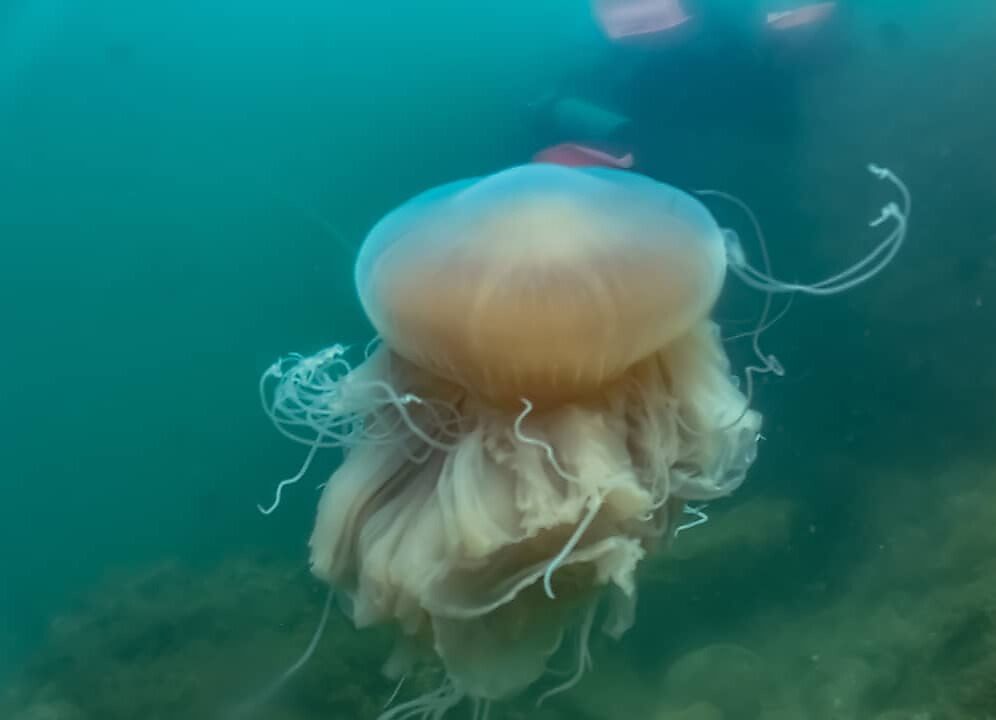

Scientific classification
- Domain: Eukaryota
- Kingdom: Animalia
- Phylum: Cnidaria
- Class: Scyphozoa
- Order: Semaeostomeae
- Family: Drymonematidae
- Genus: Drymonema
- Species: D. gorgo

Binomial name
- Drymonema gorgo Müller, 1883

= Drymonema gorgo =

Species of jellyfish

Drymonema gorgo is a species of jellyfish in the class Scyphozoa. It is found in the western South Atlantic, along the Brazilian coast. A specimen found in 2024 was approximately 60 cm in diameter and had tentacles of over 10 m in length.
