= Aurelia mianzani =

Scientific classification
- Kingdom: Animalia
- Phylum: Cnidaria
- Class: Scyphozoa
- Order: Semaeostomeae
- Family: Ulmaridae
- Genus: Aurelia
- Species: A. mianzani

Binomial name
- Aurelia mianzani Lawley, Gamero-Mora, Maronna, Chiaverano, Stampar, Hopcroft, Collins & Morandini, 2021

Species of jellyfish

Aurelia mianzani is a species of true jellyfish in the family Ulmaridae. It is found in waters off the coasts of Brazil and Argentina.

== Etymology ==
The genus name is derived from the Latin name Aurelia, which in turn is derived from aureus, meaning "golden". The specific epithet was given in honor of Dr. Hermes W. Mianzan, who collected some of the species' sequenced specimens.
