= Aurelia ayla =

Scientific classification
- Kingdom: Animalia
- Phylum: Cnidaria
- Class: Scyphozoa
- Order: Semaeostomeae
- Family: Ulmaridae
- Genus: Aurelia
- Species: A. ayla

Binomial name
- Aurelia ayla Lawley, Gamero-Mora, Maronna, Chiaverano, Stampar, Hopcroft, Collins & Morandini, 2021

Species of jellyfish

Aurelia ayla is a species of true jellyfish in the family Ulmaridae. It is known from type specimens found in waters off the coast of Bonaire.

== Etymology ==
The genus name is derived from the Latin name Aurelia, which in turn is derived from aureus, meaning "golden". The specific epithet is derived from the Turkish word ayla, meaning "halo of light around the moon"; additionally, it was given in honor of the daughter of Allen G. Collins, co-author of the species' original study, who shares the same name.
