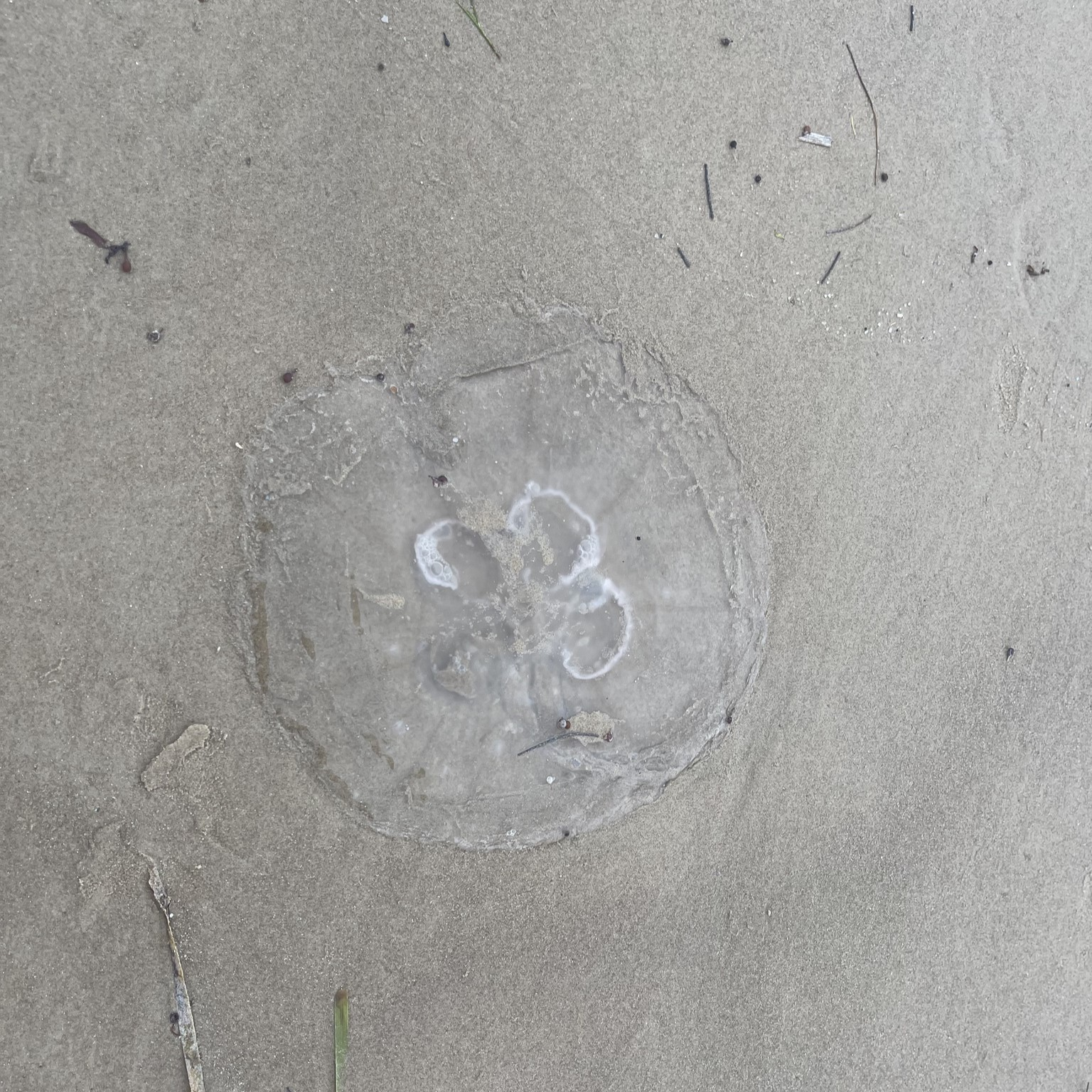
- Aurelia marginalis stranded in South Padre Island, Texas

Scientific classification
- Kingdom: Animalia
- Phylum: Cnidaria
- Class: Scyphozoa
- Order: Semaeostomeae
- Family: Ulmaridae
- Genus: Aurelia
- Species: A. marginalis

Binomial name
- Aurelia marginalis (Agassiz, 1862)

= Aurelia marginalis =

Southern moon jelly

Species of jellyfish

Aurelia marginalis (commonly called the southern moon jelly) is a species of the genus Aurelia. All species in the genus are very similar, and it is difficult to identify Aurelia medusae without genetic sampling.

== Description ==
Aurelia marginalis was first named by Louis Agassiz in 1862, who encountered the jellyfish near Florida. In 1910 Alfred G. Mayer suggested that A. marginalis was a synonym of A. aurita. However, there is morphological and genetic evidence that A. marginalis is indeed a separate species.

Aurelia marginalis in its medusa stage is "flatter than a hemisphere" and can grow up to 30 cm (12 in) in diameter. Differences between A. marginalis and A. aurita can mostly be found in the polyp stage and include "free amino acid composition, nematocyst types, morphology, and asexual reproduction," as well as genetics.

== Distribution ==
Aurelia marginalis can be found from Delaware Bay to the West Indies and throughout the Gulf of Mexico. It is a neritic species, meaning it lives in shallow waters near the coast. A. marginalis lives in warm water.
