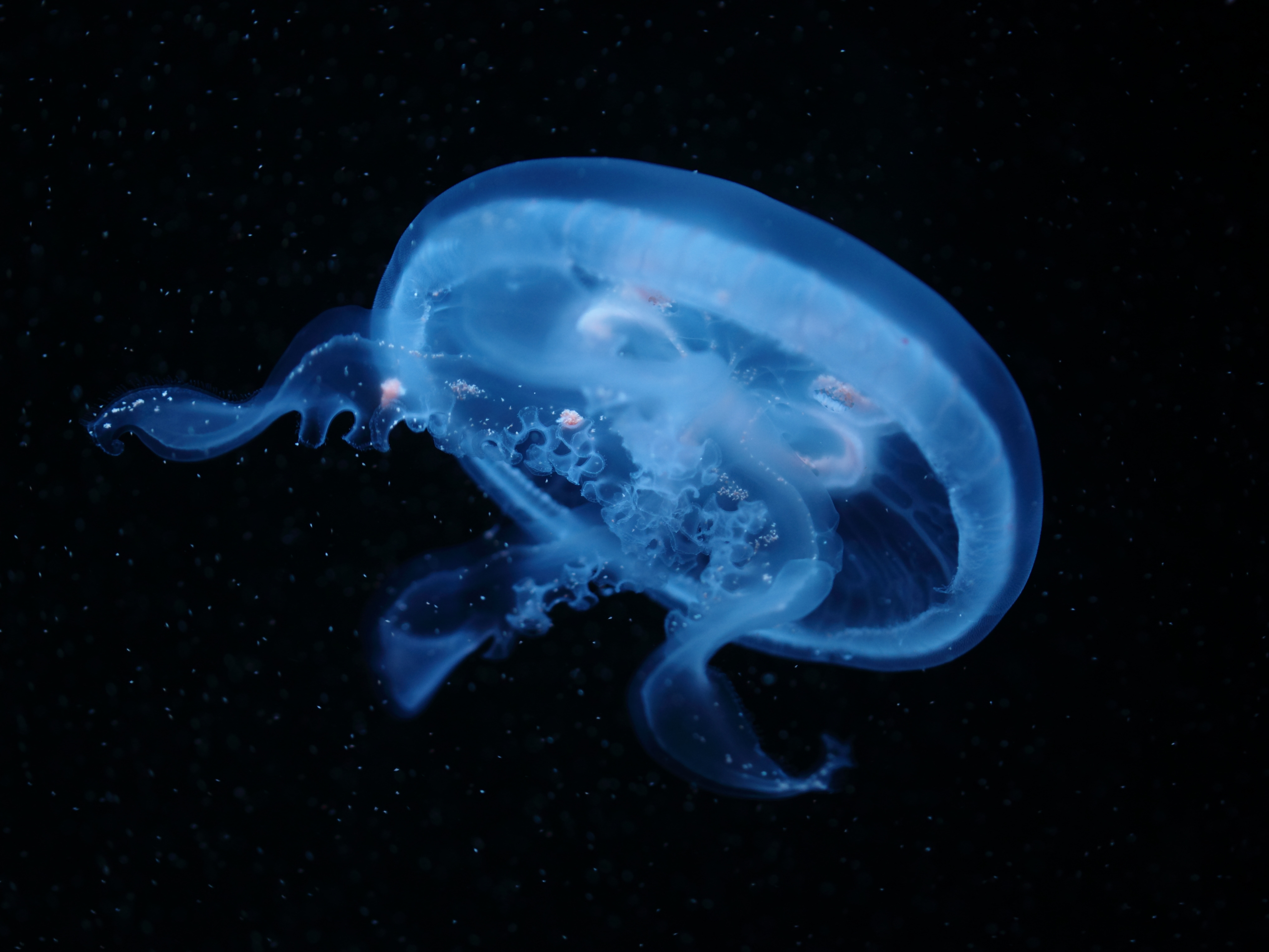
- Aurelia labiata at the Vienna Zoo

Scientific classification
- Kingdom: Animalia
- Phylum: Cnidaria
- Class: Scyphozoa
- Order: Semaeostomeae
- Family: Ulmaridae
- Genus: Aurelia
- Species: A. labiata

Binomial name
- Aurelia labiata Linnaeus, 1758

= Aurelia labiata =

Species of jellyfish

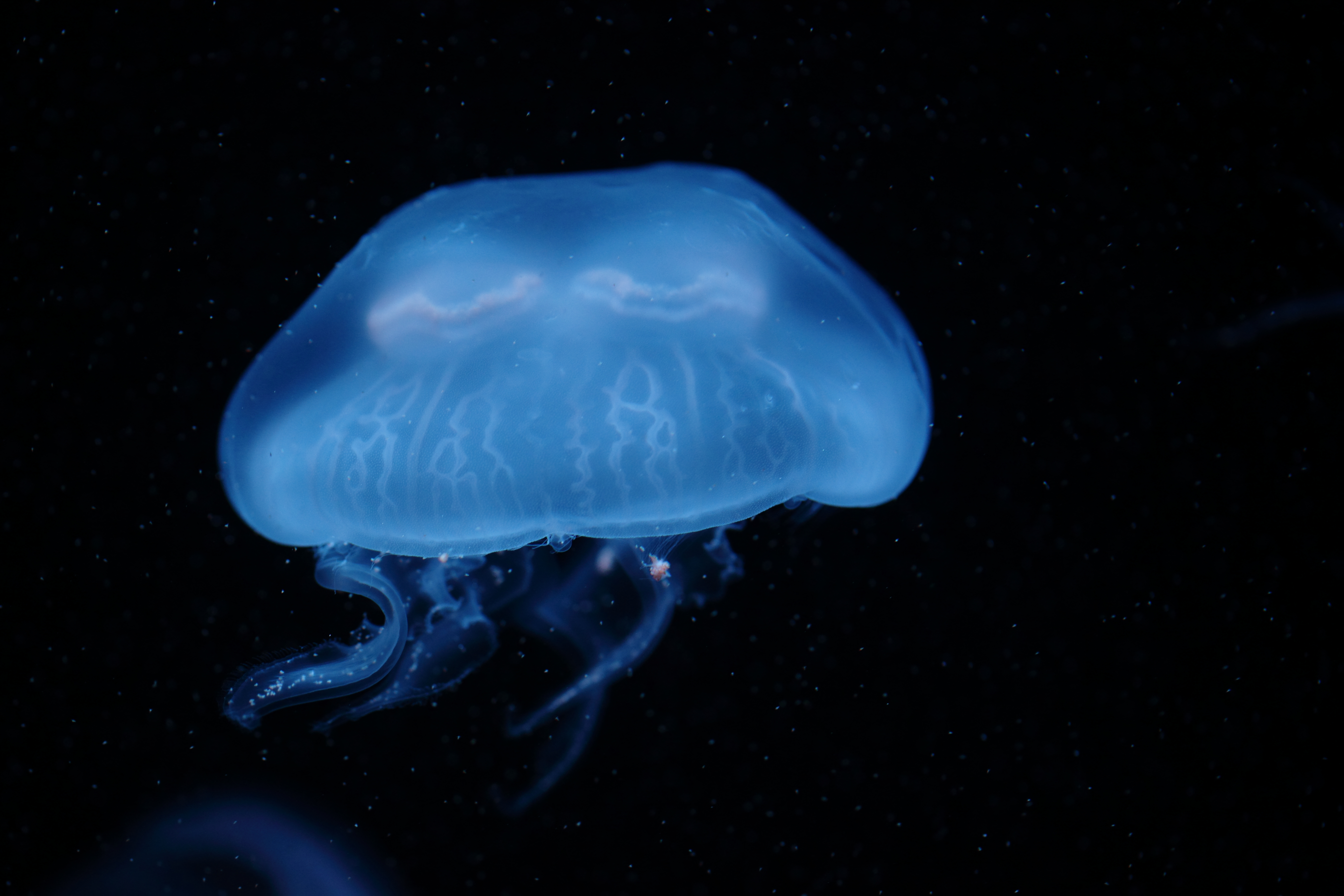
Aurelia labiata in the Vienna Zoo

Aurelia labiata, the greater moon jelly, is a species of moon jellyfish. It is a cnidarian in the family Ulmaridae. It is typically larger than Aurelia aurita, with individuals document up to 45 cm (18 in). However, much of its size range overlaps with A. aurita (up to 40 cm (16 in)), making size an imperfect diagnostic tool. Most Aurelia labiata have a 16-scalloped bell, meaning the bell indents inward at 16 points, a characteristic that also appears in other Aurelia species. Aurelia labiata occurs in the northeastern Pacific Ocean, from the northern coast of California, north to Canada and into Alaska.

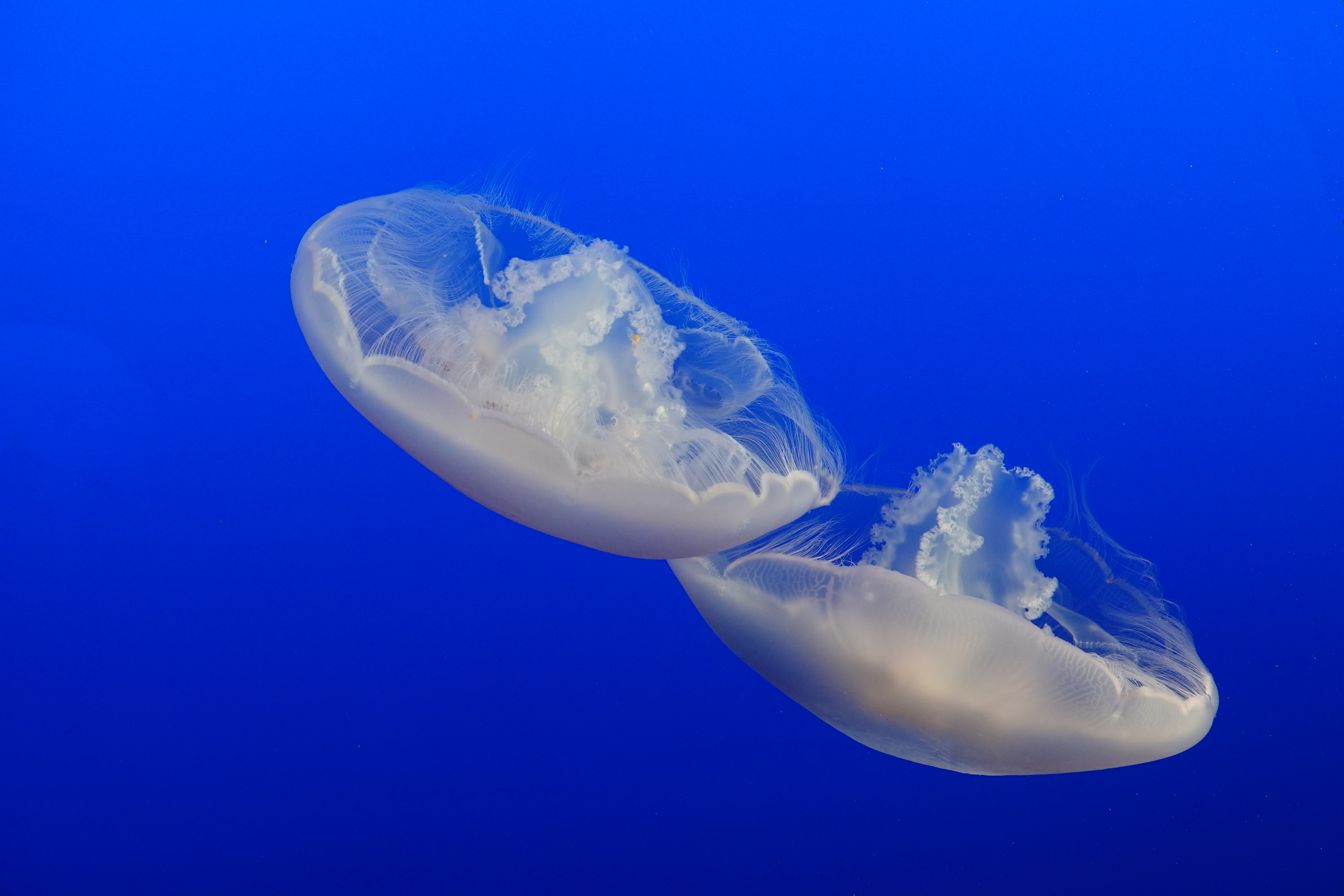
Moon Jelly at Monterey Bay Aquarium, California, USA

== Behavior ==
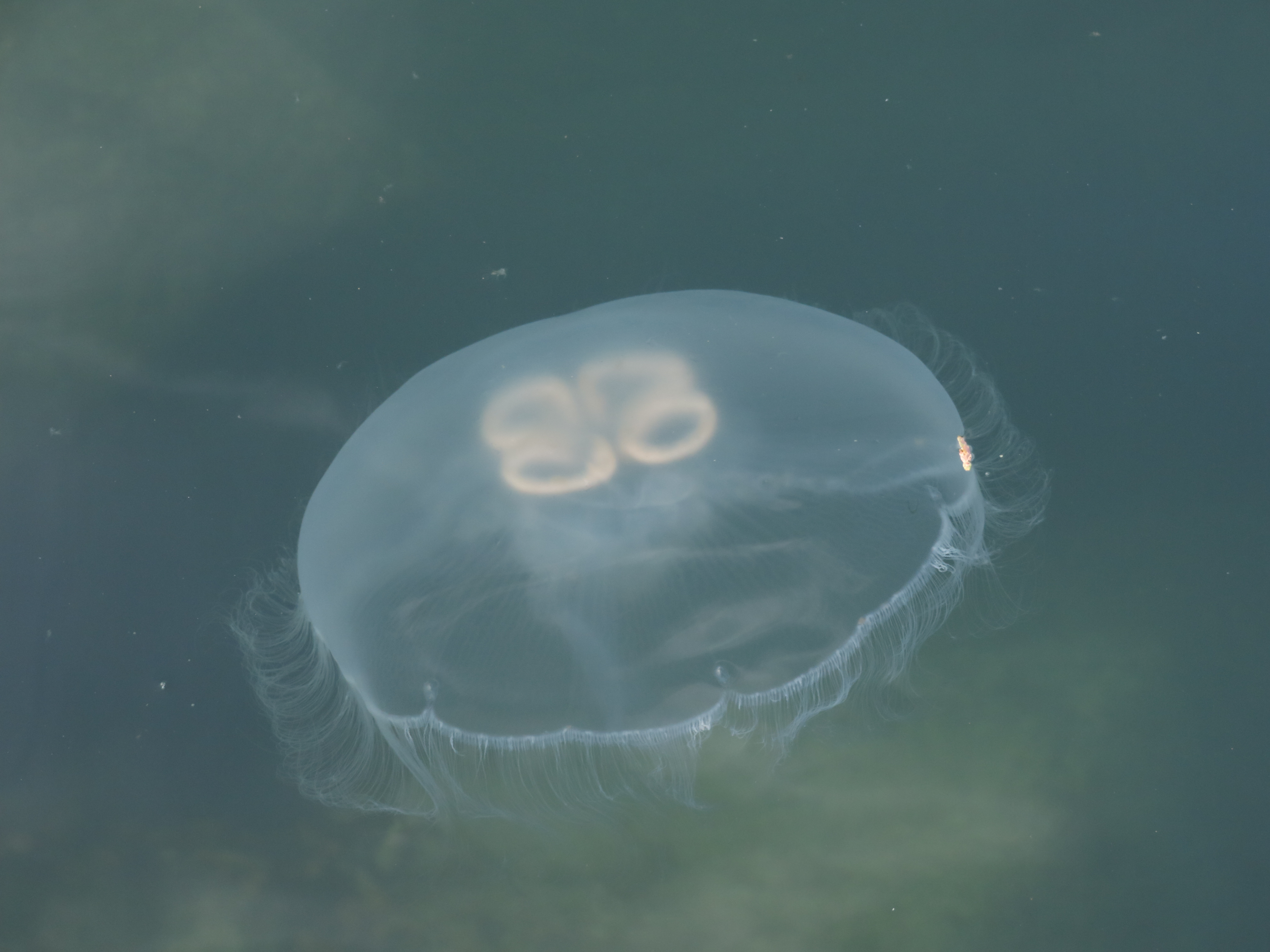
Moon Jelly off of Tangent Island, British Columbia

The Aurelia labiata have adaptive behaviors that include directional and vertical swimming. Directional swimming helps them escape from predators, approach to a food source, and swim through turbulence. Vertical swimming allows them to avoid rocky walls and low salinity. These behaviors come from their sensory receptors and nervous system that allows better mobility for their survival.

Asexual reproduction of Aurelia labiata increases with rising temperatures. Furthermore, the pH of seawater has no effect on such asexual reproduction, while lower pH levels significantly decrease the size of statoliths that are formed during the process.

== Predators ==
Aurelia labiata are fed upon by other cnidarians such as Phacellophora camtschatica and Cyanea capillata. Like many jellyfish, they are also consumed by sea turtles which are immune to their stings.
