= Aurelia miyakei =

Scientific classification
- Kingdom: Animalia
- Phylum: Cnidaria
- Class: Scyphozoa
- Order: Semaeostomeae
- Family: Ulmaridae
- Genus: Aurelia
- Species: A. miyakei

Binomial name
- Aurelia miyakei Lawley, Gamero-Mora, Maronna, Chiaverano, Stampar, Hopcroft, Collins & Morandini, 2021

Species of jellyfish

Aurelia miyakei is a species of true jellyfish in the family Ulmaridae. It is found in the Gulf of Thailand and the Kwajalein Atoll.

== Etymology ==
The genus name is derived from the Latin name Aurelia, which in turn is derived from aureus, meaning "golden". The specific epithet was given in honor of Dr. Hiroshi Miyake, who provided polyps from the species.
