= Aurelia maldivensis =

Scientific classification
- Kingdom: Animalia
- Phylum: Cnidaria
- Class: Scyphozoa
- Order: Semaeostomeae
- Family: Ulmaridae
- Genus: Aurelia
- Species: A. maldivensis

Binomial name
- Aurelia maldivensis Bigelow, 1904

Species of jellyfish

Aurelia maldivensis is a species of true jellyfish in the family Ulmaridae.

== Etymology ==
The genus name is derived from the Latin name Aurelia, which in turn is derived from aureus, meaning "golden". The specific epithet is derived from the Maldives, the type locality of the species.
