= Aurelia cebimarensis =

Scientific classification
- Kingdom: Animalia
- Phylum: Cnidaria
- Class: Scyphozoa
- Order: Semaeostomeae
- Family: Ulmaridae
- Genus: Aurelia
- Species: A. cebimarensis

Binomial name
- Aurelia cebimarensis Lawley, Gamero-Mora, Maronna, Chiaverano, Stampar, Hopcroft, Collins & Morandini, 2021

Species of jellyfish

Aurelia cebimarensis is a species of true jellyfish in the family Ulmaridae. It is known via type specimens found in waters off the coast of Brazil.

== Etymology ==
The genus name is derived from the Latin name Aurelia, which in turn is derived from aureus, meaning "golden". The specific epithet is derived from the Centro de Biologia Marinha (Center of Marine Biology) of the University of São Paulo (CEBIMar); CEBIMar, along with being an international reference for marine biology studies, is located exactly where the type specimens of Aurelia cebimarensis were collected.
