= Aurelia insularia =

Scientific classification
- Kingdom: Animalia
- Phylum: Cnidaria
- Class: Scyphozoa
- Order: Semaeostomeae
- Family: Ulmaridae
- Genus: Aurelia
- Species: A. insularia

Binomial name
- Aurelia insularia Lawley, Gamero-Mora, Maronna, Chiaverano, Stampar, Hopcroft, Collins & Morandini, 2021

Species of jellyfish

Aurelia insularia is a species of true jellyfish in the family Ulmaridae. It is known via polyp type specimens found in waters off the coast of Brazil, around Ilha Grande.

== Etymology ==
The genus name is derived from the Latin name Aurelia, which in turn is derived from aureus, meaning "golden". The specific epithet is derived from the Latin insularis, meaning "of islands", referring to how its polyps were recorded as being generally on or near islands.
