= Aurelia malayensis =

Scientific classification
- Kingdom: Animalia
- Phylum: Cnidaria
- Class: Scyphozoa
- Order: Semaeostomeae
- Family: Ulmaridae
- Genus: Aurelia
- Species: A. malayensis

Binomial name
- Aurelia malayensis Lawley, Gamero-Mora, Maronna, Chiaverano, Stampar, Hopcroft, Collins & Morandini, 2021

Species of jellyfish

Aurelia malayensis is a species of true jellyfish in the family Ulmaridae. It is known via type specimens found in the Philippines.

== Etymology ==
The genus name is derived from the Latin name Aurelia, which in turn is derived from aureus, meaning "golden". The specific epithet is taken from the Malay Archipelago, which includes the species' type locality and estimated distribution.
