= Aurelia smithsoniana =

Scientific classification
- Kingdom: Animalia
- Phylum: Cnidaria
- Class: Scyphozoa
- Order: Semaeostomeae
- Family: Ulmaridae
- Genus: Aurelia
- Species: A. smithsoniana

Binomial name
- Aurelia smithsoniana Lawley, Gamero-Mora, Maronna, Chiaverano, Stampar, Hopcroft, Collins & Morandini, 2021

Species of jellyfish

Aurelia smithsoniana is a species of true jellyfish in the family Ulmaridae. It is found in the Bocas del Toro province of Panama.

== Etymology ==
The genus name is derived from the Latin name Aurelia, which in turn is derived from aureus, meaning "golden". The specific epithet is derived from the Smithsonian Tropical Research Institute, which is located in and has supported marine studies in the Bocas del Toro region, where the species is distributed.
