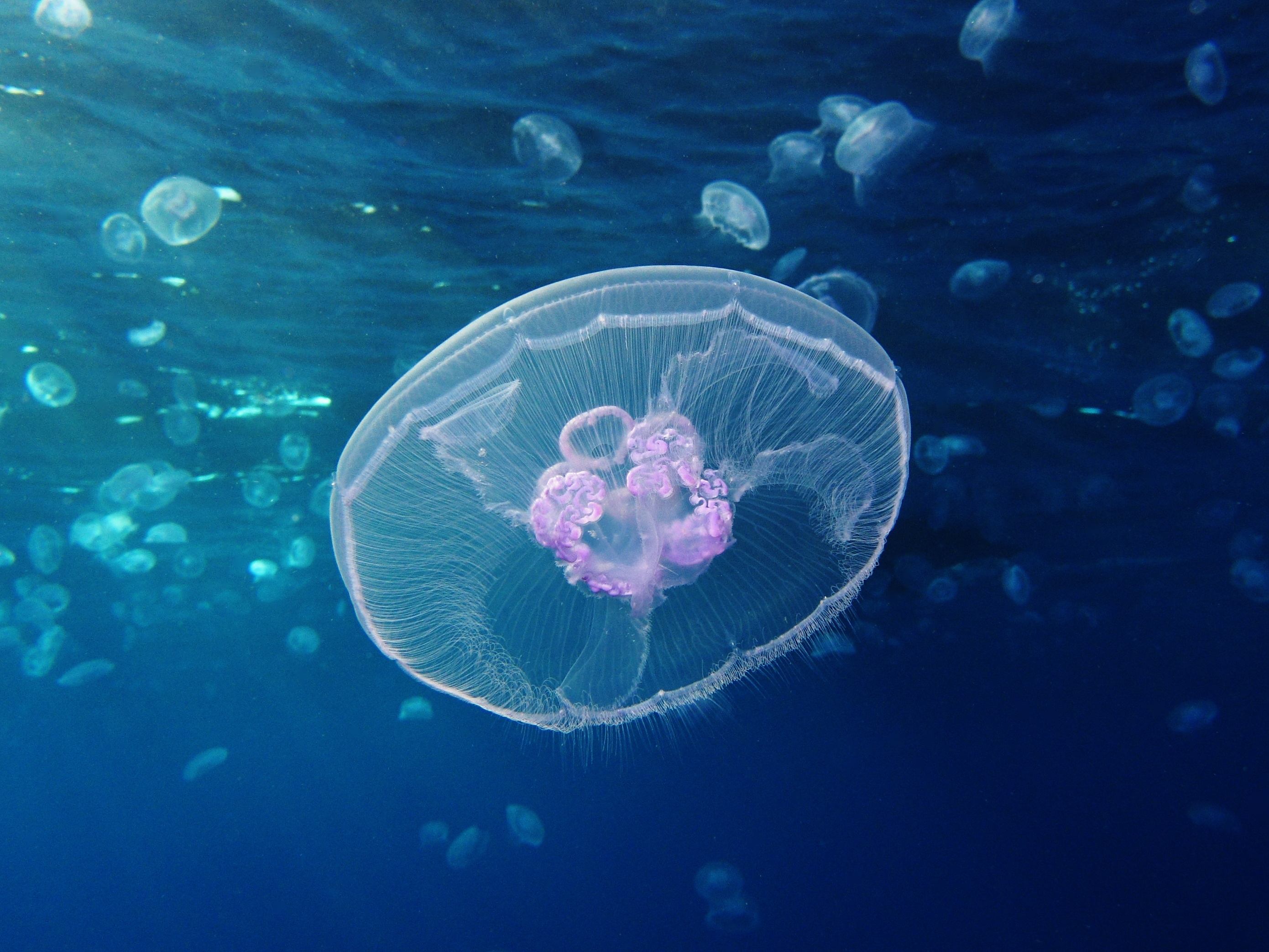
- Adult Aurelia medusa in the Red Sea

Scientific classification
- Kingdom: Animalia
- Phylum: Cnidaria
- Class: Scyphozoa
- Order: Semaeostomeae
- Family: Ulmaridae
- Genus: Aurelia; Lamarck, 1816

Synonyms
- Aurellia Péron & Lesueur, 1810; Ocyroe Péron & Lesueur, 1810

= Aurelia (cnidarian) =

Genus of jellyfish

Aurelia is a genus of jellyfish that are commonly called moon jellies, which are in the class Scyphozoa. There are currently 25 accepted species and many that are still not formally described.

The genus was first described in 1816 by Jean-Baptiste Lamarck in his book Histoire Naturelle des Animaux sans Vertèbres (Natural History of Invertebrates). It has been suggested that Aurelia is the best-studied group of gelatinous zooplankton, with Aurelia aurita the best-studied species in the genus; two other species, Aurelia labiata and Aurelia limbata were also traditionally investigated throughout the 20th century. In the early 2000s, studies that considered genetic data showed that diversity in Aurelia was higher than expected based solely on morphology, so one cannot confidently attribute the results from most of the previous studies to the species named. More recently, studies have highlighted the morphological variability (including the potential for phenotypic plasticity) in this genus, emphasizing the difficulty of identifying cryptic species.

Species of Aurelia can be found in the Atlantic, Arctic, Pacific and Indian Oceans, and seem to be more common in temperate regions, such as in the waters off northern China, Japan, Korea, New Zealand, the northeastern and northwestern coasts of the United States, and those of northern Europe.

Moon jellies differ from many jellyfish in that they lack long, potent stinging tentacles. Instead they have hundreds of short, fine tentacles that line the bell margin. The sting has a mild effect on humans, with most having little or no reaction.

Aurelia undergoes alternation of generations, whereby the sexually-reproducing pelagic medusa stage is either male or female, and the benthic polyp stage reproduces asexually. Meanwhile, life cycle reversal, in which polyps are formed directly from juvenile and sexually mature medusae or their fragments, was also observed in Aurelia coerulea (= Aurelia sp. 1).

== Description ==
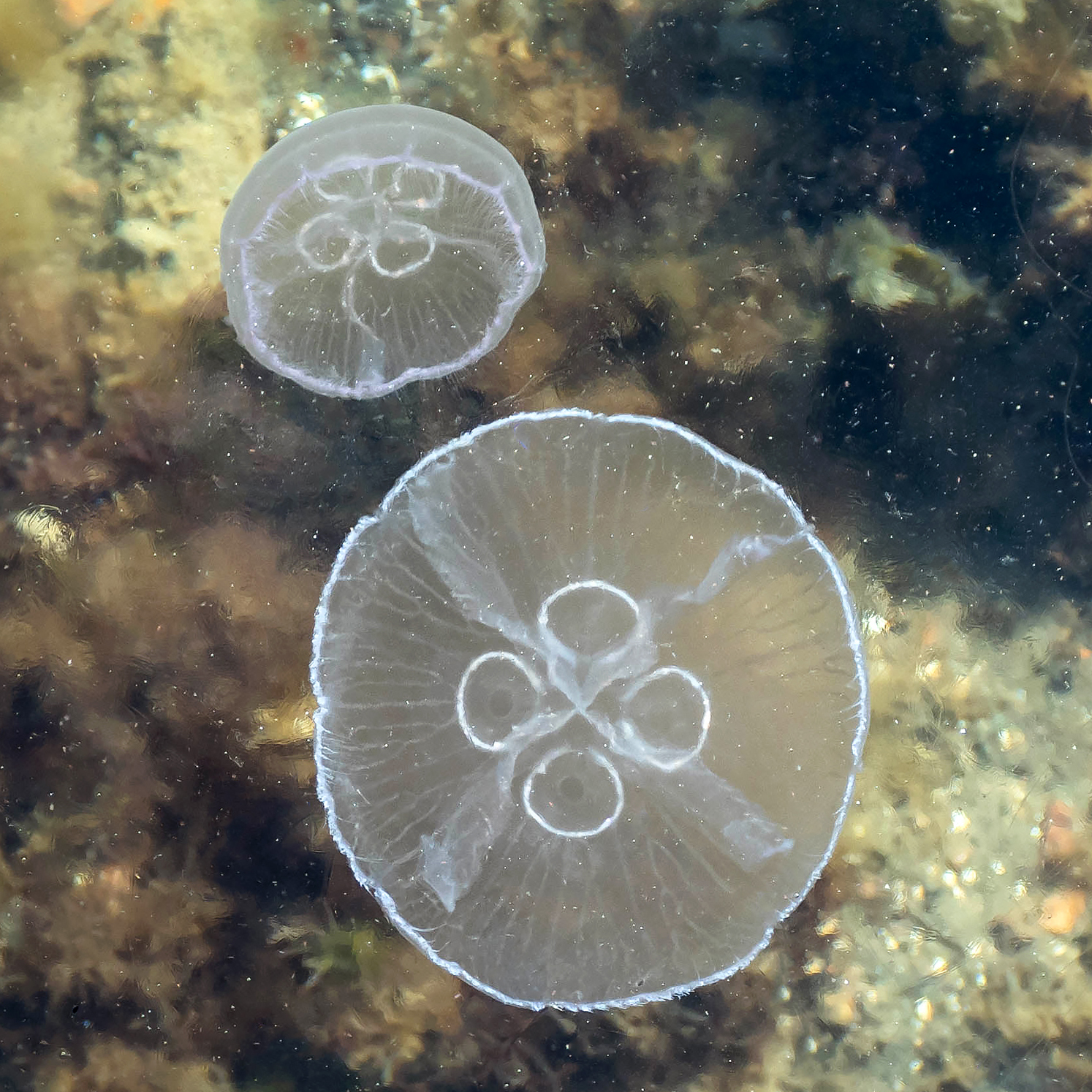
Two Aurelia aurita in Gullmarn fjord, Sweden

The similar appearances of moon jellyfish species is what has made them so hard to identify. They tend to have a variety of different sizes, however, they typically range 5–38 cm (2.0–15.0 in) in diameter with an average of 18 cm (7.1 in) wide and 8 cm (3.1 in) in height. The polyps of these jellyfish can grow to 1.6 cm (0.63 in) tall and their ephyrae have an average diameter of 0.4 cm (0.16 in).

The basic body plan of Aurelia consists of several parts. The animal lacks respiratory, excretory, and circulatory systems. The adult medusa of Aurelia, with a transparent look, has an umbrella margin membrane and tentacles that are attached to the bottom. It has four bright gonads that are under the stomach. The medusae are either male or female (gonochory).

The adult medusae are typically translucent, but the color of their gut can change based on what they eat; for example, if they eat certain crustaceans, they can have a pink or lavender tint to them; if they were to eat brine shrimp, the tint would be more of an orange color. Their polyps usually have around 16 tentacles (although Aurelia insularia has 27–33 tentacles) which mostly help with feeding.

=== Physiology ===
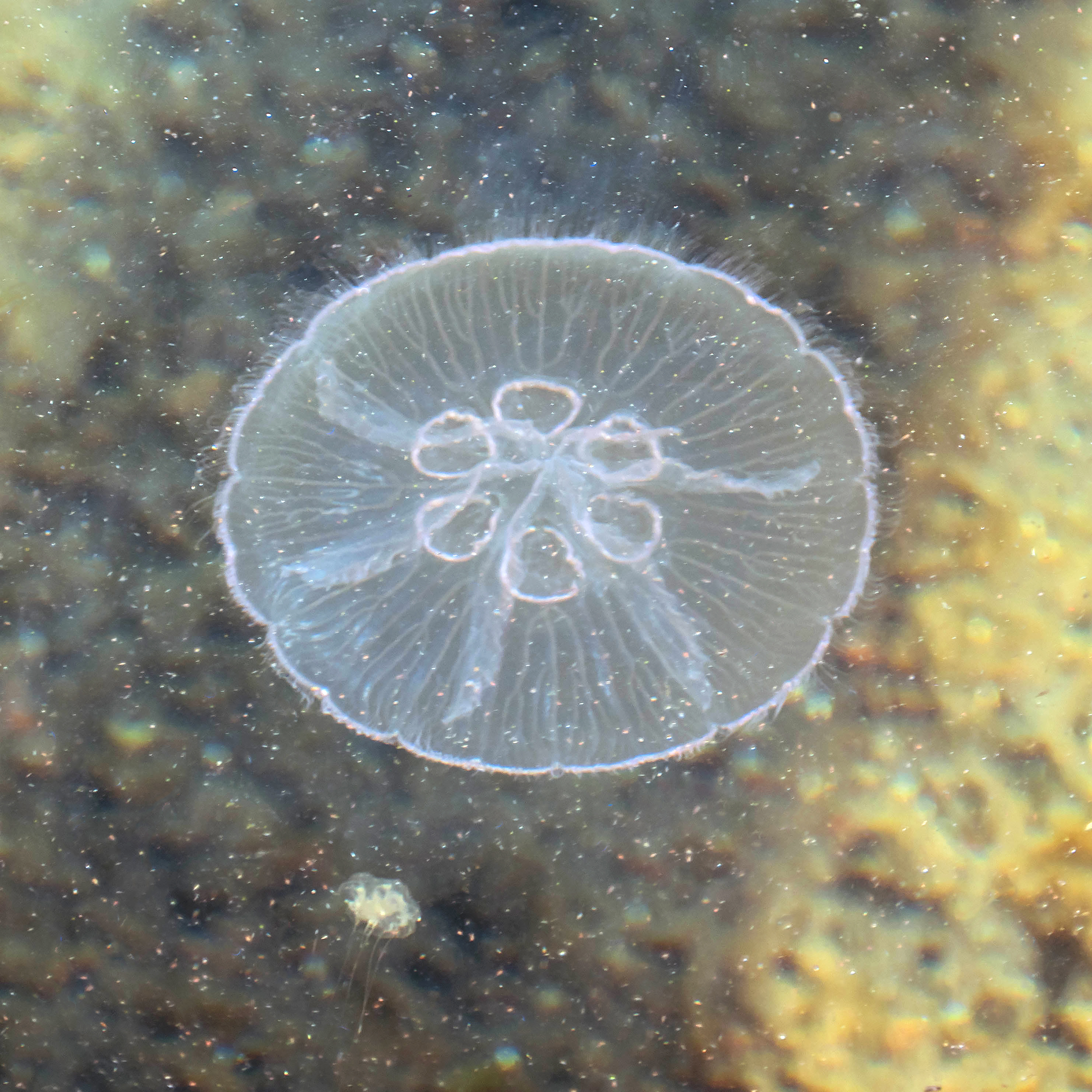
Aurelia with an anomalous number of gonads — most individuals have four.

Aurelia does not have respiratory parts such as gills, lungs, or trachea; it respires by diffusing oxygen from water through the thin membrane covering its body. Within the gastrovascular cavity, low oxygenated water can be expelled and high oxygenated water can come in by ciliated action, thus increasing the diffusion of oxygen through the cell. The large surface area membrane to volume ratio helps Aurelia diffuse more oxygen and nutrients into the cells.

Food travels through the muscular manubrium while the radial canals help disperse the food. There is a middle layer of mesoglea, a gastrodervascular cavity with a gastrodermis, and an epidermis. There is a nerve net that is responsible for contractions in swimming muscles and feeding responses.

They are able to sense light and dark and up and down due to rhopalia around the bell margin.

==== Venom ====
Testing on frogs determined that A. aurita has a proteinaceous venom that causes muscle twitching by inducing the irreversible depolarization of the muscle membrane that is believed to be caused by an increase in the membrane's permeability to sodium ions.

== Species ==
The following species of Aurelia is accepted by the World Register of Marine Species:

- Aurelia aurita (Linnaeus, 1758)
- Aurelia ayla Lawley, Gamero-Mora, Maronna, Chiaverano, Stampar, Hopcroft, Collins & Morandini, 2021
- Aurelia cebimarensis Lawley, Gamero-Mora, Maronna, Chiaverano, Stampar, Hopcroft, Collins & Morandini, 2021
- Aurelia clausa Lesson, 1830
- Aurelia coerulea von Lendenfeld, 1884
- Aurelia colpota Brandt, 1835
- Aurelia columbia Lawley, Gamero-Mora, Maronna, Chiaverano, Stampar, Hopcroft, Collins & Morandini, 2021
- Aurelia dubia Vanhöffen, 1888
- Aurelia hyalina Brandt, 1835
- Aurelia insularia Lawley, Gamero-Mora, Maronna, Chiaverano, Stampar, Hopcroft, Collins & Morandini, 2021
- Aurelia labiata Chamisso & Eysenhardt, 1821
- Aurelia limbata Brandt, 1835
- Aurelia malayensis Lawley, Gamero-Mora, Maronna, Chiaverano, Stampar, Hopcroft, Collins & Morandini, 2021
- Aurelia maldivensis Bigelow, 1904
- Aurelia marginalis Agassiz, 1862
- Aurelia mianzani Lawley, Gamero-Mora, Maronna, Chiaverano, Stampar, Hopcroft, Collins & Morandini, 2021
- Aurelia miyakei Lawley, Gamero-Mora, Maronna, Chiaverano, Stampar, Hopcroft, Collins & Morandini, 2021
- Aurelia montyi Lawley, Gamero-Mora, Maronna, Chiaverano, Stampar, Hopcroft, Collins & Morandini, 2021
- Aurelia mozambica Brown & Gibbons, 2021
- Aurelia persea (Forsskål, 1775)
- Aurelia profunda Frolova, Mammone & Miglietta, 2025
- Aurelia pseudosolida Garić & Batistić, 2022
- Aurelia rara Lawley, Gamero-Mora, Maronna, Chiaverano, Stampar, Hopcroft, Collins & Morandini, 2021
- Aurelia relicta Scorrano, Aglieri, Boero, Dawson & Piraino, 2016
- Aurelia smithsoniana Lawley, Gamero-Mora, Maronna, Chiaverano, Stampar, Hopcroft, Collins & Morandini, 2021
- Aurelia solida Browne, 1905
- Aurelia vitiana Agassiz & Mayer, 1899
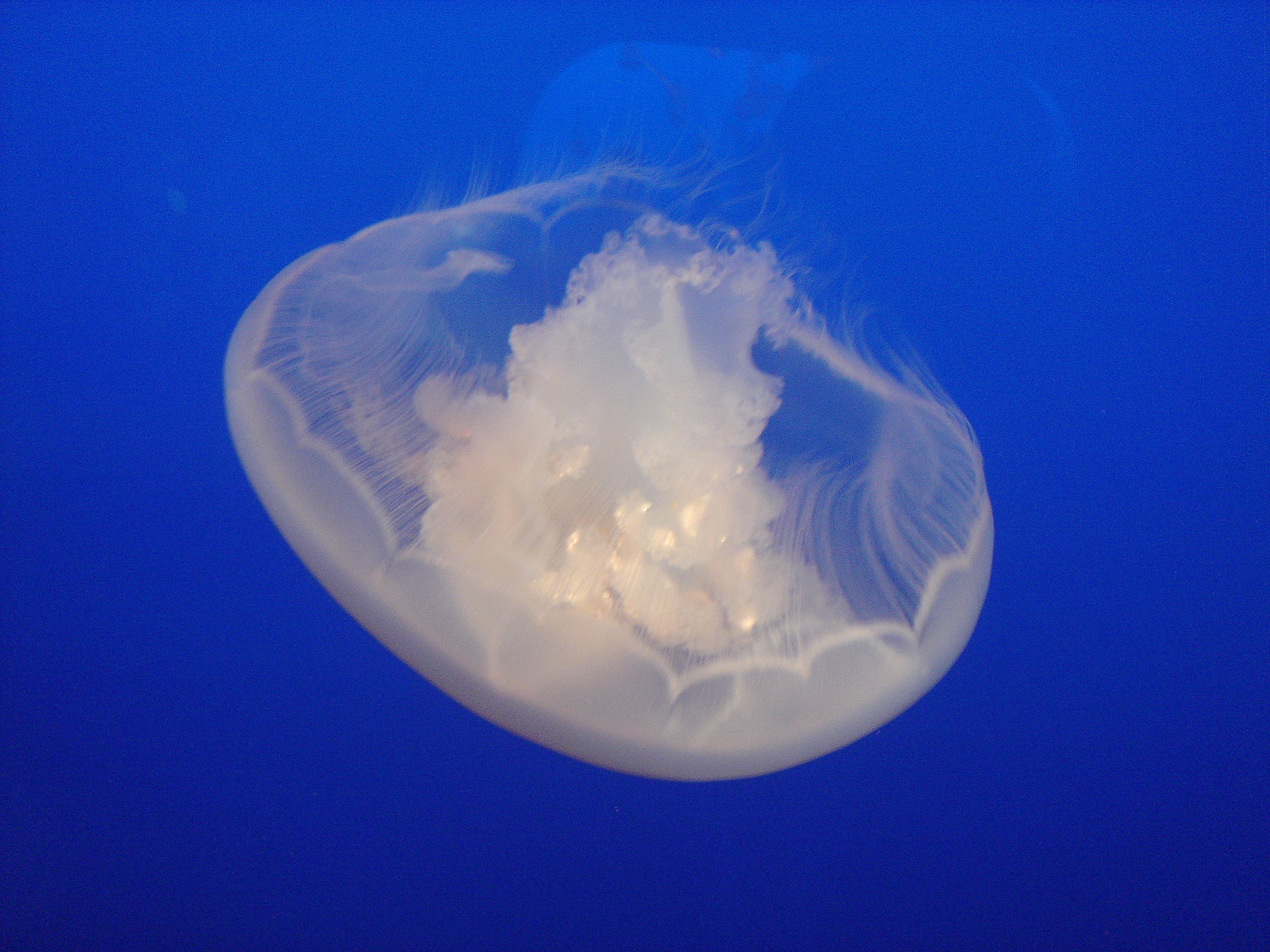
Aurelia sp. from the Monterey Bay Aquarium

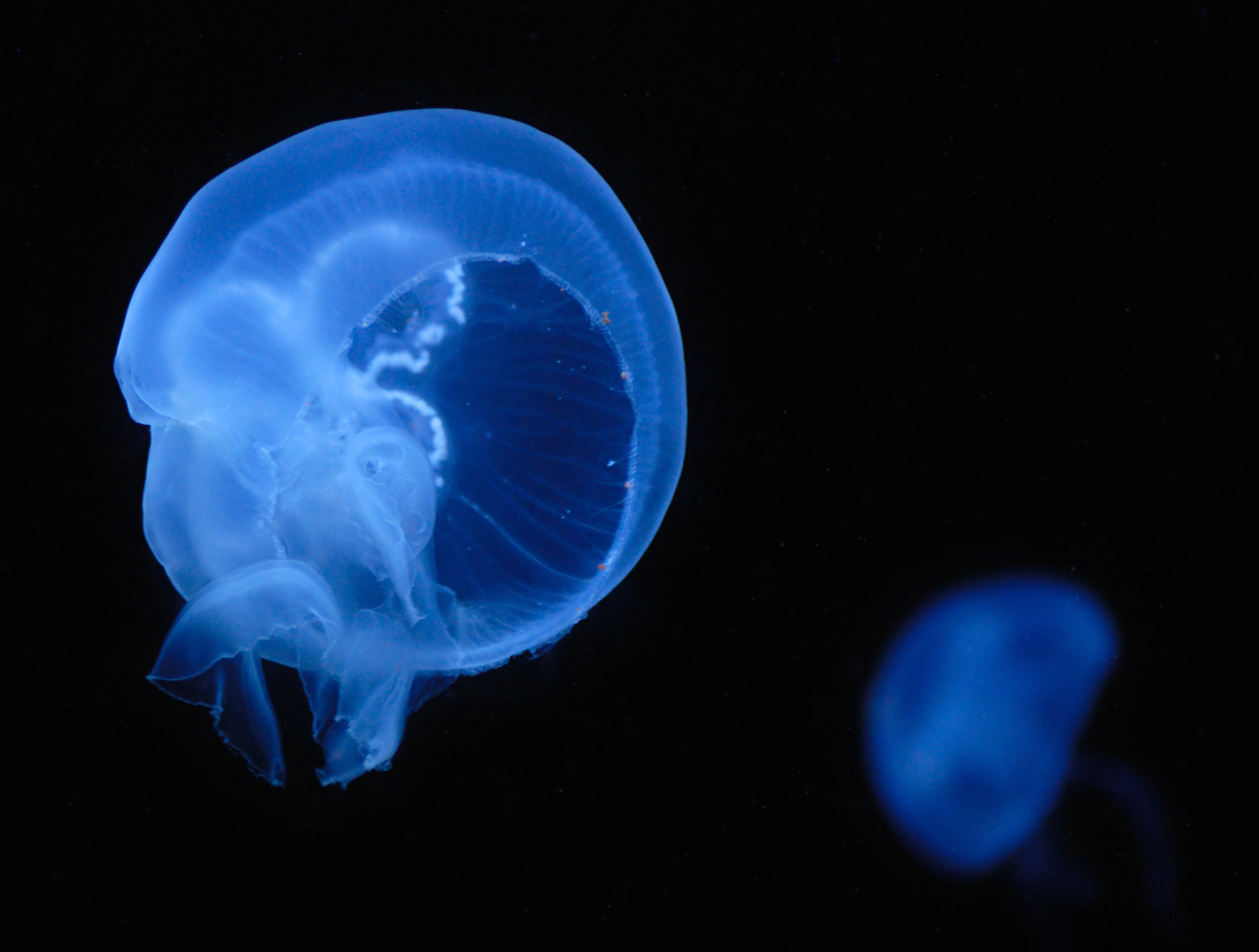
A damaged Aurelia sp. individual

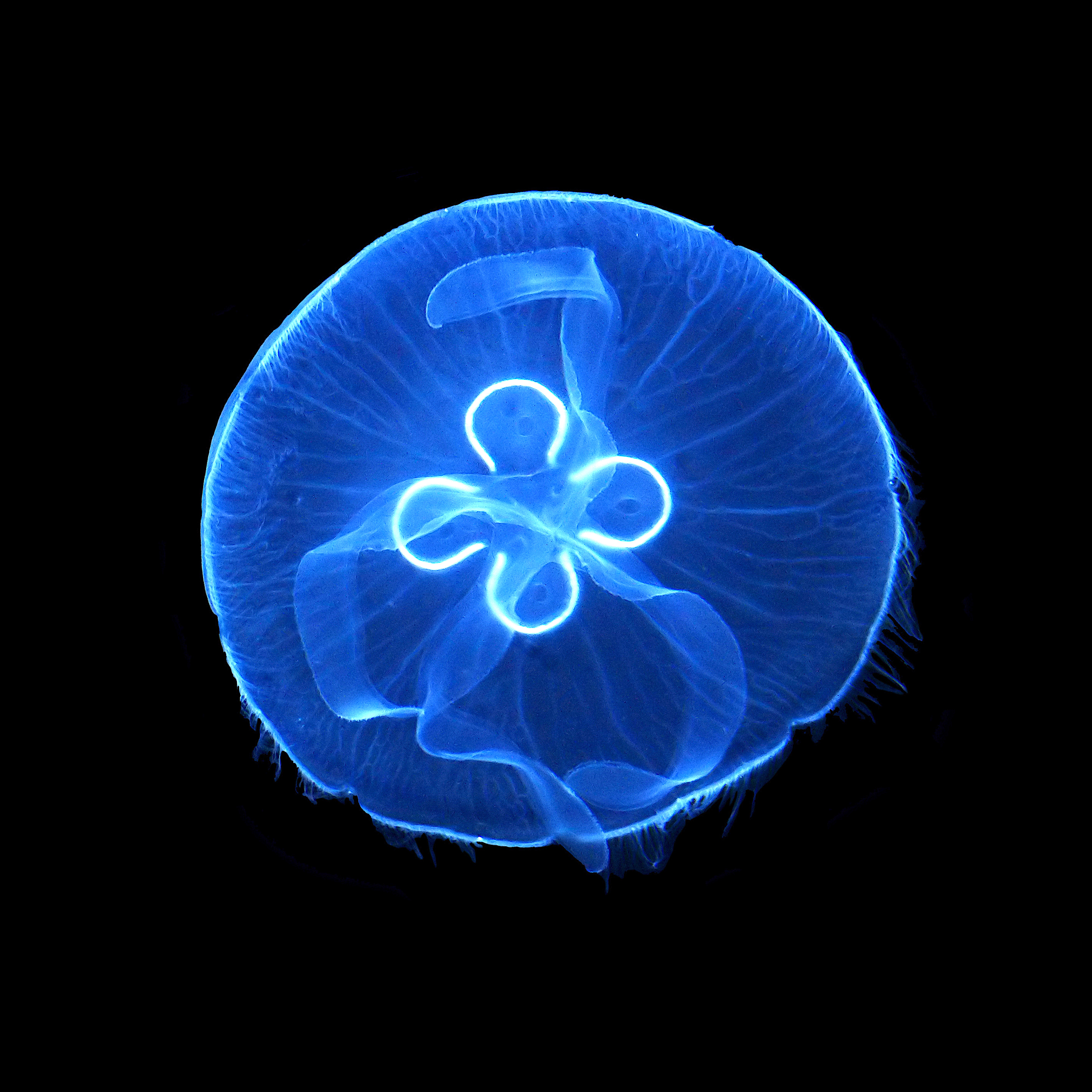
An adult Aurelia aurita

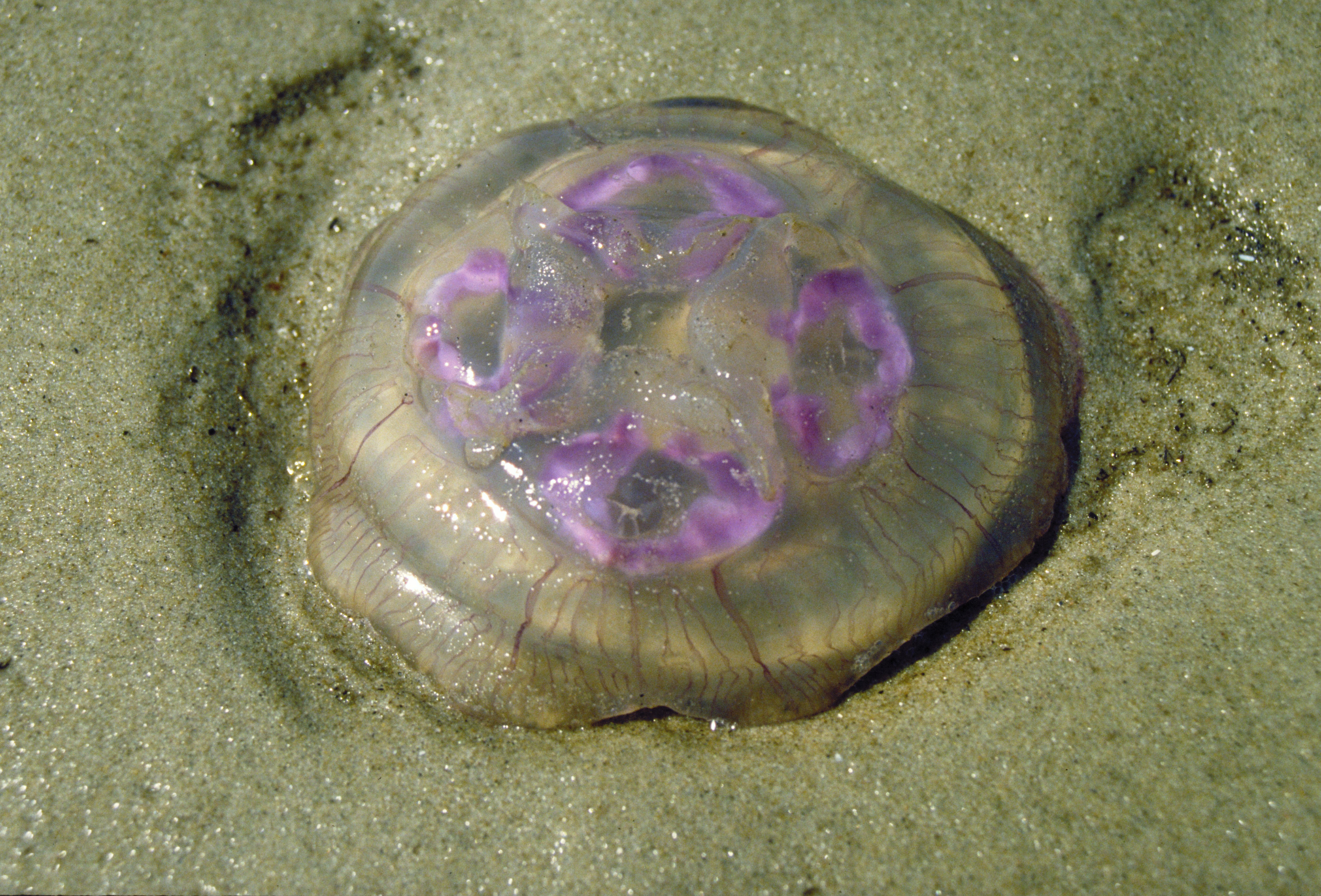
On the beach

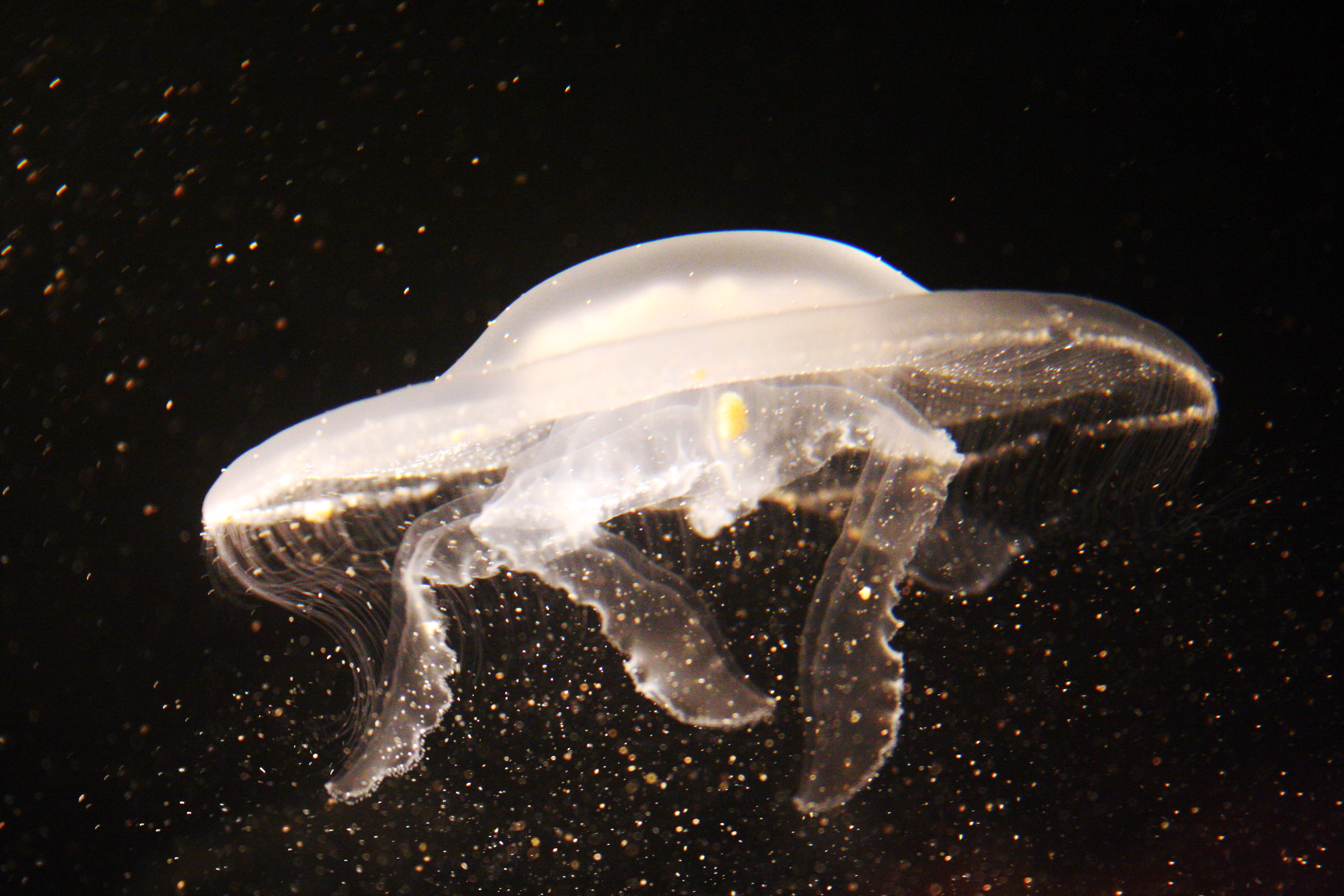

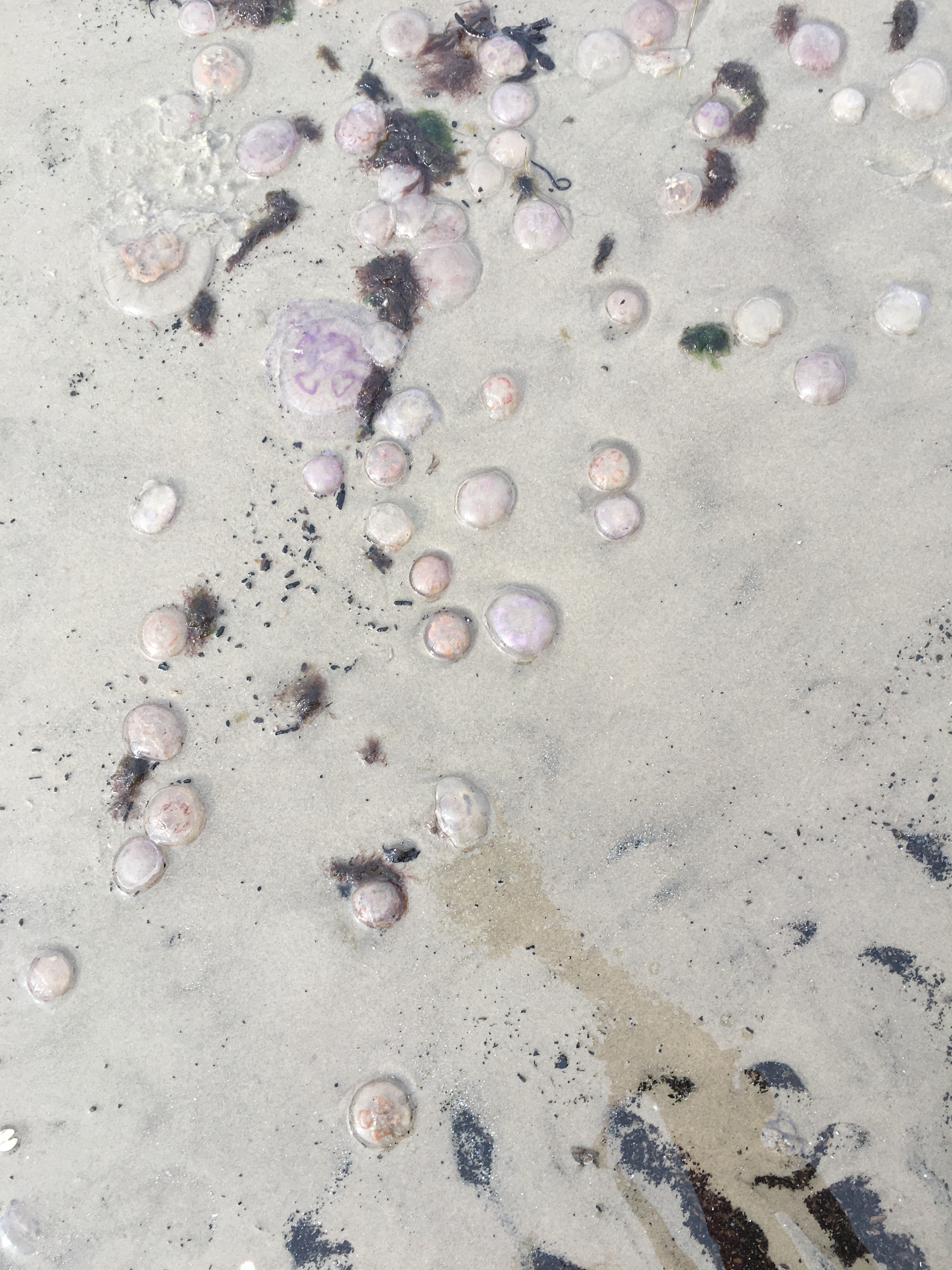
Aurelia aurita washed up on the beach, Jūrmala

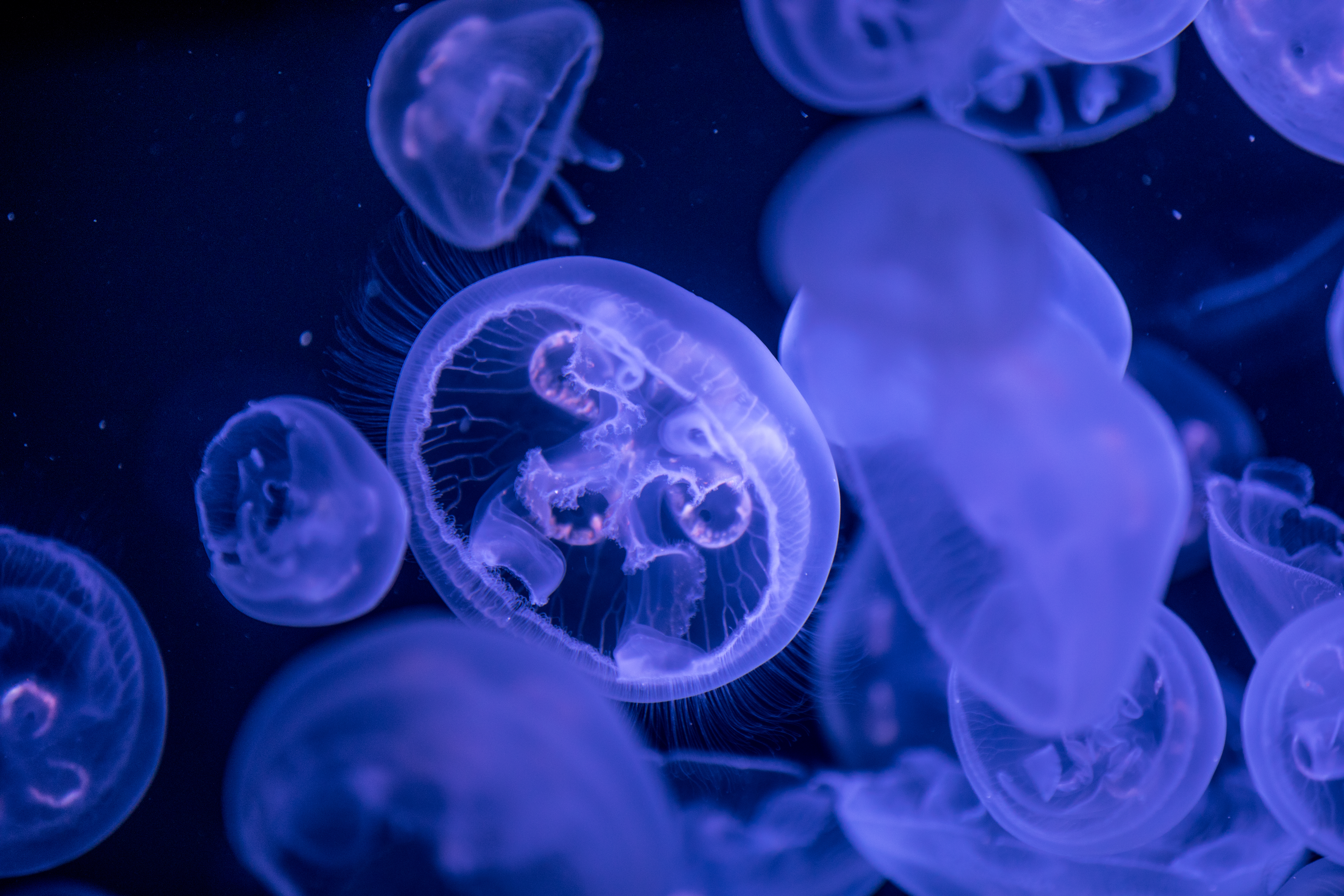
Aurelia aurita at Ozeaneum Stralsund

== Distribution and habitat ==
Aurelia species inhabit worldwide habitats.It is found in the North, Black, Baltic and Caspian Seas, Northeast Atlantic, Greenland, northeastern USA and Canada, Northwest Pacific and South America. In general, Aurelia is an inshore genus that can be found in estuaries and harbors.

Moon jellyfish swimming (high resolution)

Aurelia live in ocean water temperatures ranging from 6–31 °C (43–88 °F); with optimum temperatures of 9–19 °C (48–66 °F). It prefers temperate seas with consistent currents. It has been found in waters with salinity as low as 6 parts per thousand.

The relation between summer hypoxia and moon jellyfish distribution is prominent during the summer months of July and August where temperatures are high and dissolved oxygen (DO) is low. Of the three environmental conditions tested, bottom DO has the most significant effect on moon jellyfish abundance. Moon jellyfish abundance is the highest when bottom dissolved oxygen concentration is lower than 2.0 mg L^{−1}. Moon jellyfish show a strong tolerance to low DO conditions, which is why their population is still relatively high during the summer. Generally, hypoxia causes species to move from the oxygen depleted zone, but this is not the case for the moon jellyfish. Furthermore, bell contract rate, which indicates moon jellyfish feeding activity, remains constant despite lower DO concentrations than normal. Other major fish predators that are also present in these coastal waters do not seem to show the same high tolerance to low DO concentrations that the moon jellyfish exhibit. The feeding and predatory performance of these fish significantly decreases when DO concentrations are so low. This allows for less competition between the moon jellyfish and other fish predators for zooplankton. Low DO concentrations in coastal waters such as Tokyo Bay in Japan and the Seto Inland Sea prove to be advantageous for the moon jellyfish in terms of feeding, growth, and survival.

== Biology ==
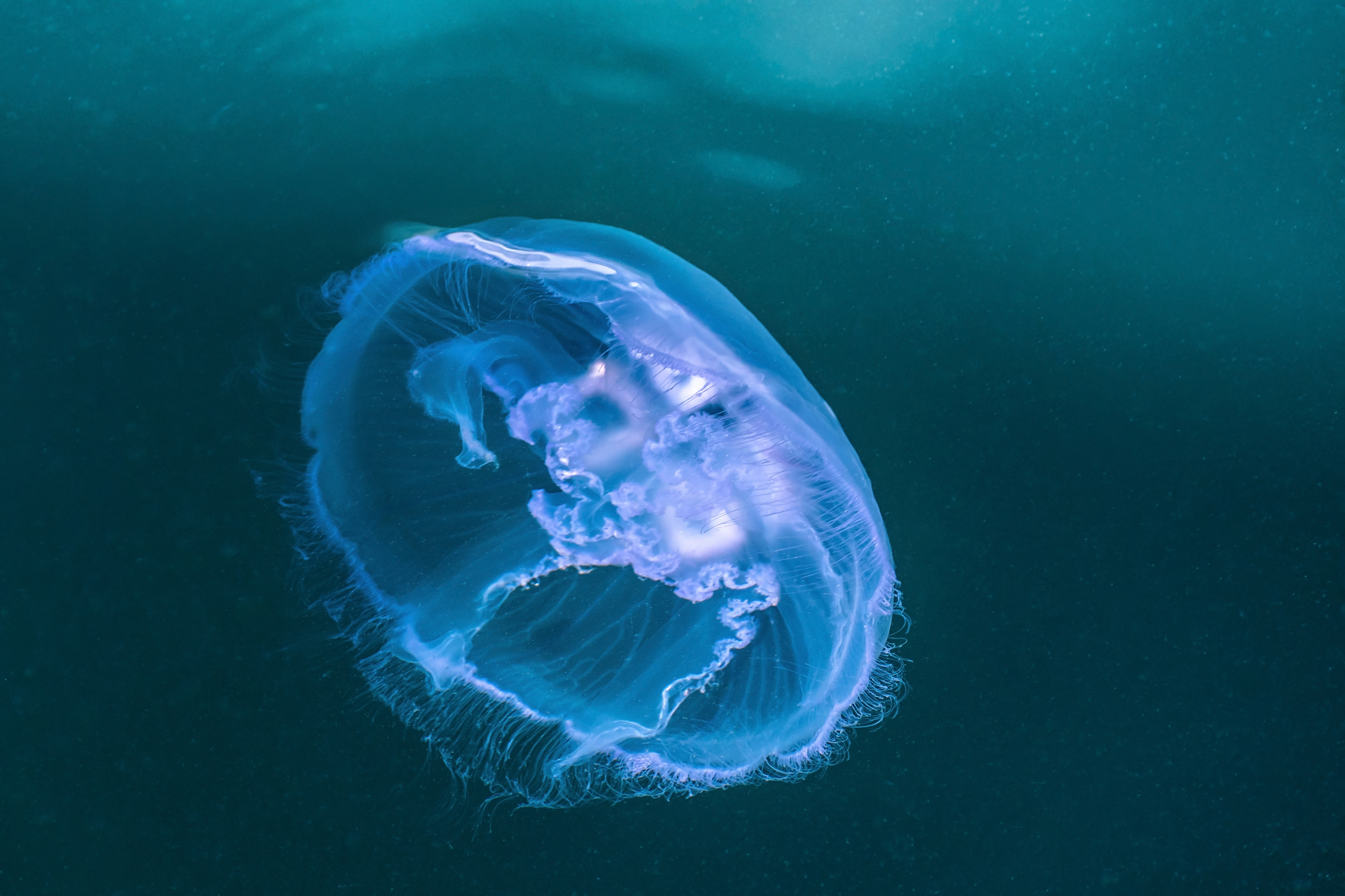
Aurelia aurita in Åbyfjorden, Sweden

The diet of Aurelia is similar to that of other jellyfish. They primarily feed on zooplankton. Occasionally, they are also seen feeding on gelatinous zooplankton such as hydromedusae and ctenophores.

The food is caught with its nematocyst-laden tentacles, tied with mucus, brought to the gastrovascular cavity, and passed into the cavity by ciliated action. There, digestive enzymes from serous cells break down the food. Little is known about the requirements for particular vitamins and minerals, but due to the presence of some digestive enzymes, we can deduce in general that Aurelia can process carbohydrates, proteins, and lipids.

During July and August, it is observed that moon jellyfish aggregations of 250 individuals consumed an estimated 100% of the mesozooplankton biomass in the Seto Inland Sea. They may prey on or compete with commercially important fish and their larvae, as well as cause several issues for trawling boats when large aggregations occur, as they may clog and damage fishing nets as well as force fisherman to relocate.

A 2020 study found that Aurelia's body system is not significantly affected by artificial materials like microbeads, which can be found in cosmetic and personal care products. Aurelia aurita was able to recognize that microbeads were not food so there was not any physiological or histological harm.

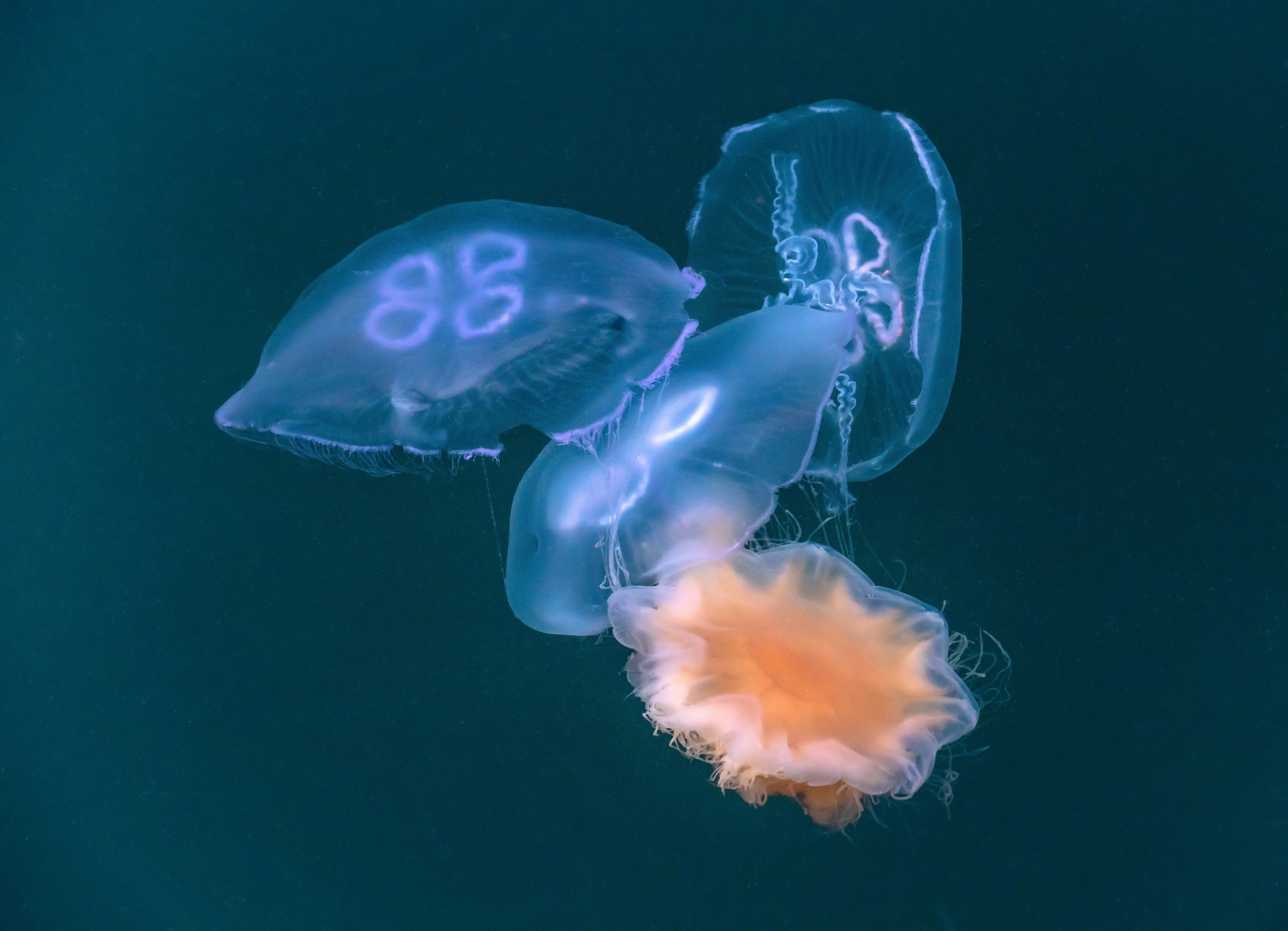
Three moon jellies captured by a lion's mane jellyfish

Aurelia have high proportions of polyunsaturated fatty acids compared to other prey types and are a source of vital nutrients for predators. Aurelia are known to be eaten by a wide variety of predators, including the ocean sunfish (Mola mola), the leatherback sea turtle (Dermochelys coriacea), the scyphomedusa Phacellophora camtschatica, and a very large hydromedusa (Aequorea victoria). In 2016, it was reported from the Red Sea that Aurelia were seasonally preyed upon by two herbivorous fish. Moon jellies are also fed upon by sea birds, which may be more interested in the amphipods and other small arthropods that frequent the bells of Aurelia, but in any case, birds do some substantial amount of damage to these jellyfish that often are found just at the surface of bays. Aurelia species have been suggested to have high mortality during the ephyra stage, which potentially affects the population size of the later medusa stage. While the main cause remains unknown, it is believed that they are consumed by one of three potential predatory filter-feeding sessile organisms: mussels, ascidians, and barnacles.

Some metazoan parasites attack Aurelia, as well as most other species of jellyfish.

=== Reproduction ===
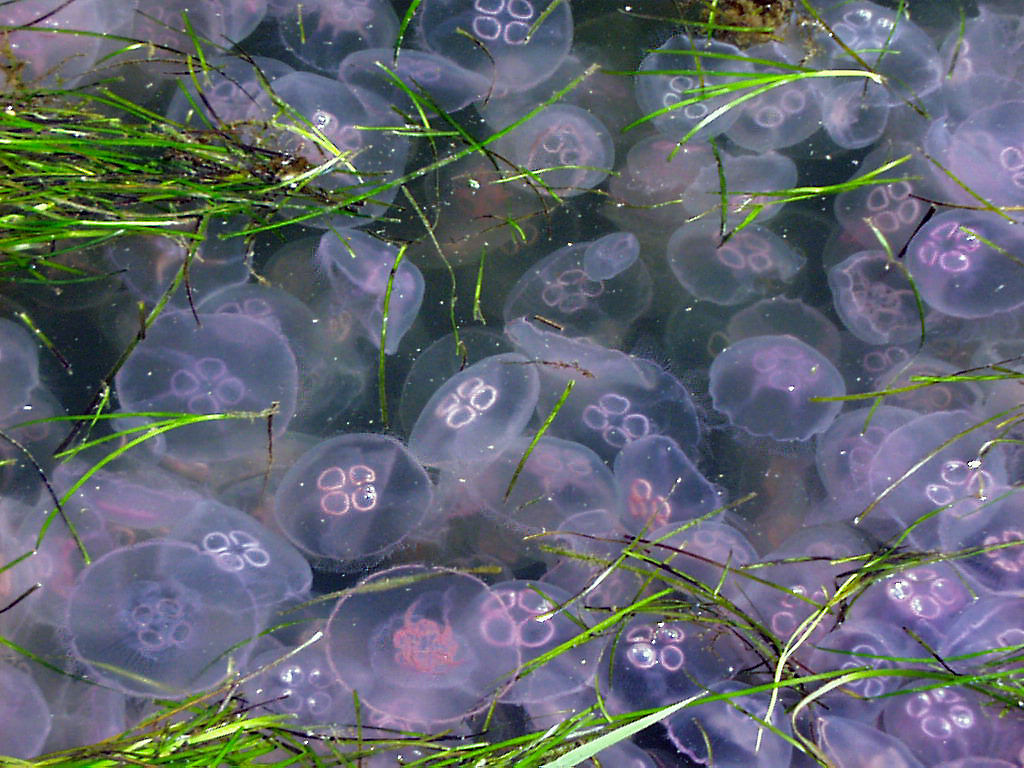
Aurelia aurita in Limfjord, Aalborg, Denmark

The medusa stage of the jellyfish reproduce sexually. The males release strings of sperm and the females ingest them. Once the ciliated larvae develop from the egg, they settle on or near the sea floor and develop into benthic polyps. The polyps then reproduce asexually and bud into ephyrae which later turn into medusae.

The young larval stage, a planula, has small ciliated cells and after swimming freely in the plankton for a day or more, settles on an appropriate substrate, where it changes into a special type of polyp called a "scyphistoma", which divides by strobilation into small ephyrae that swim off to grow up as medusae. There is an increasing size from starting stage planula to ephyra, from less than 1 mm in the planula stage, up to about 1 cm in ephyra stage, and then to several cm in diameter in the medusa stage.

Aurelia jellyfish naturally die after living and reproducing for several months. It is probably rare for these moon jellies to live more than about six months in the wild, although specimens cared for in public aquarium exhibits typically live several to many years. In the wild, the warm water at the end of summer combines with exhaustive daily reproduction and lower natural levels of food for tissue repair, leaving these jellyfish more susceptible to bacterial and other disease problems that likely lead to the demise of most individuals. Such problems are responsible for the demise of many smaller species of jellyfish. In 1997, it was summarized that seasonal reproduction leaves the gonads open to infection and degradation.

A 2015 study has found that A. aurita are capable of life cycle reversal where individuals grow younger instead of older, akin to the "immortal jellyfish" Turritopsis dohrnii.

== See also ==
- Gelatinous zooplankton
