= Aurelia montyi =

Scientific classification
- Kingdom: Animalia
- Phylum: Cnidaria
- Class: Scyphozoa
- Order: Semaeostomeae
- Family: Ulmaridae
- Genus: Aurelia
- Species: A. montyi

Binomial name
- Aurelia montyi Lawley, Gamero-Mora, Maronna, Chiaverano, Stampar, Hopcroft, Collins & Morandini, 2021

Species of jellyfish

Aurelia montyi is a species of true jellyfish in the family Ulmaridae. It is found in the eastern Gulf of Mexico.

== Etymology ==
The genus name is derived from the Latin name Aurelia, which in turn is derived from aureus, meaning "golden". The specific epithet was given in honor of Dr. William "Monty" Graham, who collected a significant amount of specimens for the species.
