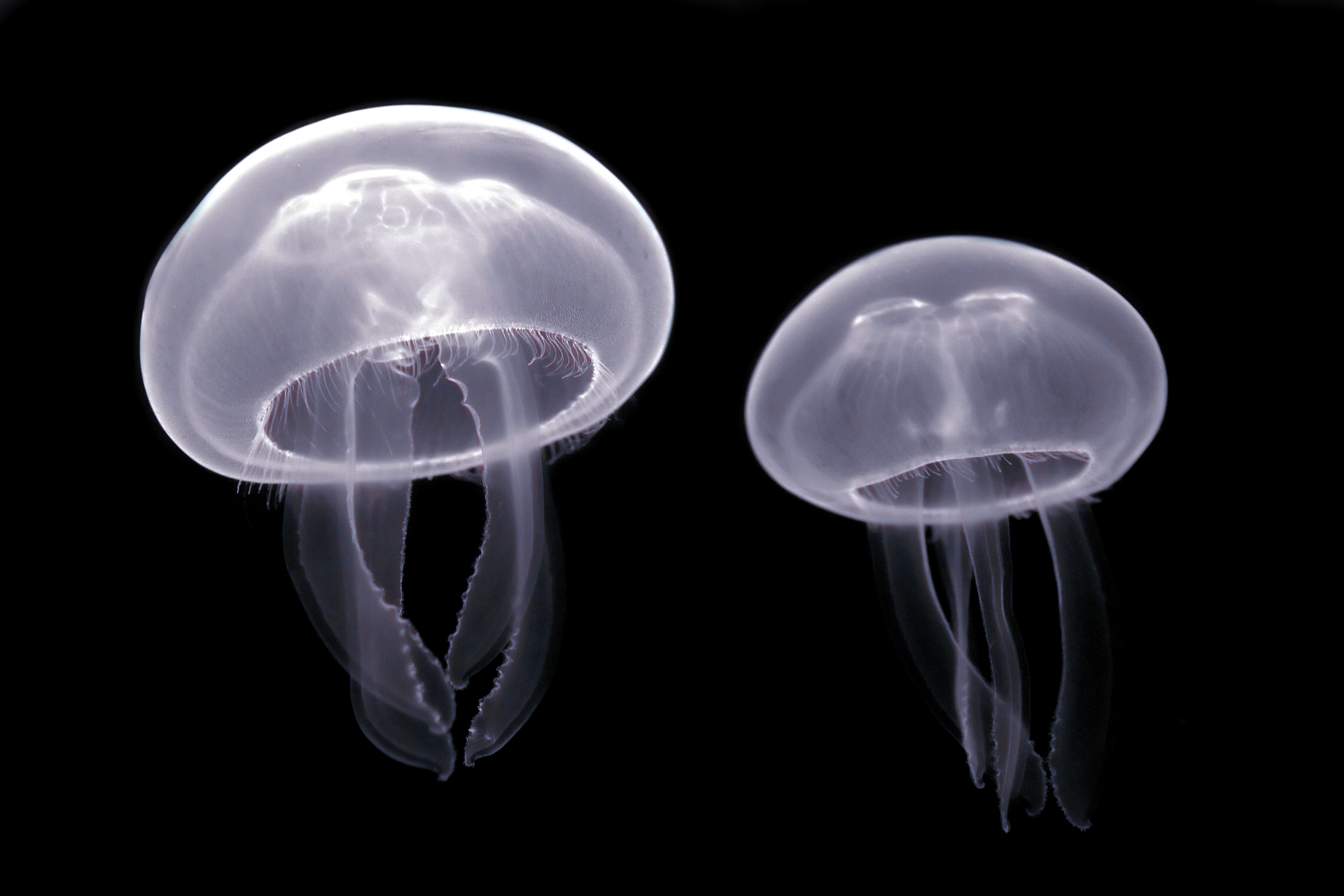
- Aurelia aurita in the Pairi Daiza aquarium, Belgium

Scientific classification
- Kingdom: Animalia
- Phylum: Cnidaria
- Class: Scyphozoa
- Order: Semaeostomeae
- Family: Ulmaridae
- Genus: Aurelia
- Species: A. aurita

Binomial name
- Aurelia aurita (Linnaeus, 1758)

Synonyms
- Aurellia flavidula Peron & Lesueur, 1810; Medusa aurita Linnaeus, 1758; Medusa purpurea Pennant, 1777

= Aurelia aurita =

Species of jellyfish

Aurelia aurita (also called the common jellyfish, moon jellyfish, moon jelly, northern moon jelly or saucer jelly) is a species of true jellyfish in the family Ulmaridae and the type species of its genus, Aurelia. Before the 2020s, the species was considered cosmopolitan, but the taxon has since been split into at least 28 species. The species now identified as A. aurita is only found in the north Atlantic and in Argentina and is not dangerous to humans.

== Description ==
Like other species in the genus, the jellyfish is almost entirely translucent, usually about 25–40 cm (10–16 in) in diameter, and can be recognized by its four horseshoe-shaped gonads, easily seen through the top of the bell.

It feeds by collecting medusae, plankton, copepods, mollusks, and fish eggs with its short, fine tentacles, and bringing them into its body for digestion. The sting has a mild effect on humans, with most having little or no reaction. It is capable of only limited motion, and drifts with the current, even when swimming.

== Range ==
A. aurita is endemic to the northeastern Atlantic Ocean, including the Baltic Sea where the 1758 type specimen was collected. Established populations are also found in the Northeastern United States and Argentina, where they were introduced (although natural dispersion to the United States can't be ruled out). A single specimen has also been found in the Pacific Northwest.

== Reproduction and life history ==
The life cycle of Aurelia aurita is similar to other species in the genus, consisting of two main stages: the free-swimming medusa and the benthic polyp, also known as a scyphistoma. During the medusa stage, A. aurita reproduces sexually, as opposed to the asexually reproducing polyp stage. The scyphistoma stage can survive for months without feeding, and have been shown to have relatively low feeding selectivity. In this stage, A. aurita can adapt to several different environmental conditions. They can be found in estuaries, bays, fjords, and polluted waters, among other habitats.

The transition from polyp to medusa (known as strobilation) is triggered by environmental signals, the most notable being seasonal temperature changes. The transformation is regulated by both developmental signaling pathways and molecular mechanisms specific to A. aurita. Studies have found that certain secreted proteins increase in activity right before metamorphosis, including ones that act as precursors to hormones involved in strobilation.

The presence of a native microbiome in the polyp stage is also essential for successful asexual reproduction via strobilation. Polyps that are lacking their associated microbial community tend to show abnormal or impaired strobilation, often producing few or malformed ephyrae. The microbes need to be present before the strobilation process begins, as later introduction does not restore normal development. The microbiome also plays a role in regulating developmental gene expression, and direct interactions between the host tissues and bacteria appear to be necessary for a successful transition from polyp to medusa.

The reproduction of A. aurita are heavily influenced by temperature, food availability, salinity, and light levels. They can adjust their reproductive strategies based on their environmental conditions. For example, higher levels of food availability lead to more growth and many smaller offspring. Low levels of food leads to fewer, larger offspring that have higher survivability.

== Taxonomic confusion ==
Most species in the genus are very similar, and it is difficult to determine the species of Aurelia medusae without genetic sampling. In the 1990s, only two species were recognized in the genus, including A. aurita, and the species was considered to have a worldwide distribution. In the 2020s, reexamination of morphology and analysis of genetic samples revealed that specimens previously identified as A. aurita belong to at least 28 different species. Much of the research published about the species before this split may instead describe one or more related species.
