= Oral arm =

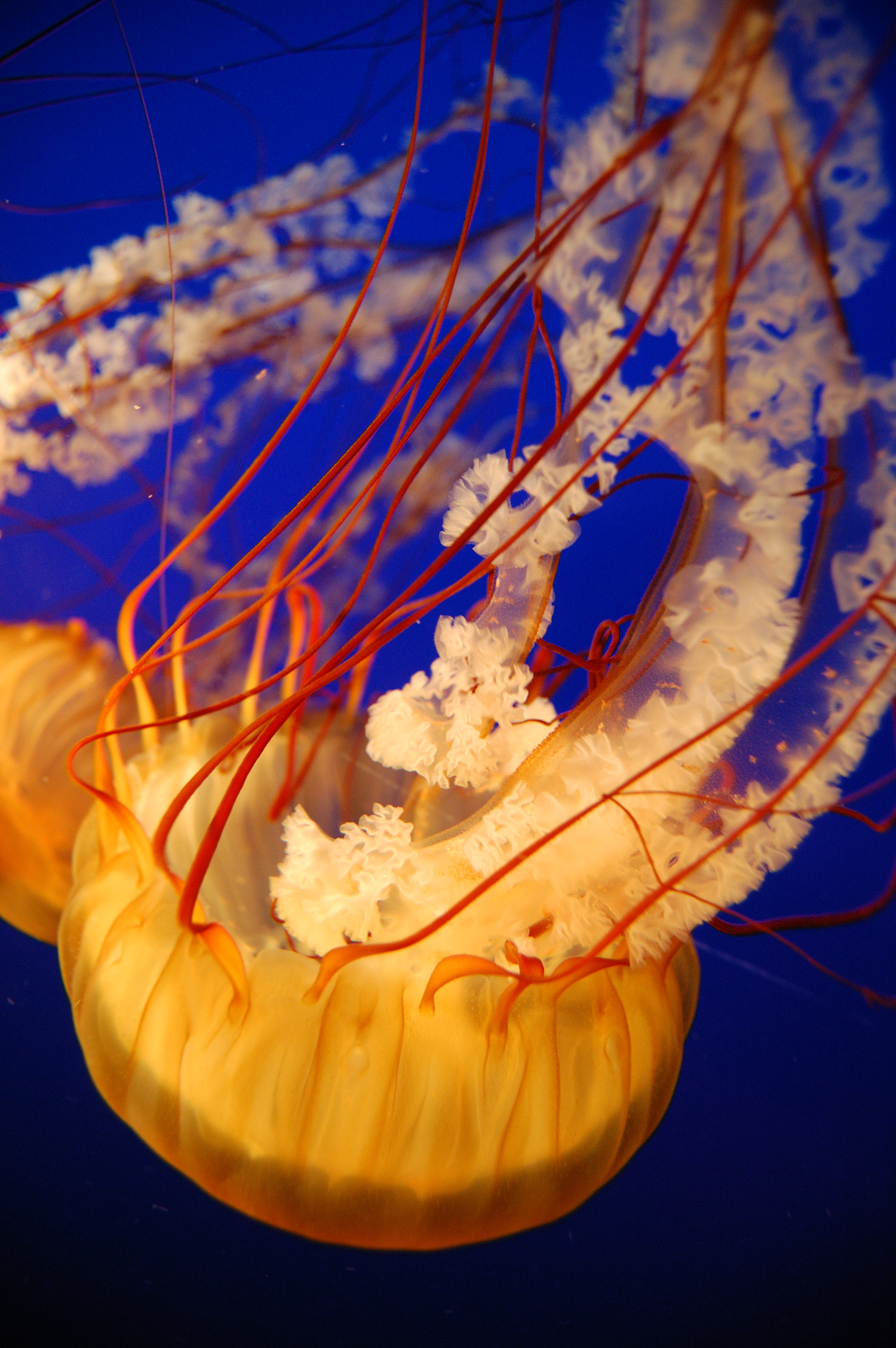
A Pacific sea nettle Chrysaora fuscescens has four long, frilly oral arms.

An oral arm is an anatomical structure of "true" sea jellies (or Scyphozoans), which belong to the class Scyphozoa. Oral arms characterize Semaeostomeae, an order of large jellyfish.

The oral arms (of which there are usually four) are located around the mouth and hold the stinging cells, or cnidocysts, which are used to inject potential prey (or potential predators) with venom.

== Functions ==
These four long oral arms, hang from the center of the underside, where the mouth of the jellyfish is located. In most cases, 24 other, thinner extensile tentacles hang from the rim of the bell. Jellyfish reproduce sexually. Males release sperm through their mouth into the water column and this is received into the female's mouth, where fertilization occurs. Development occurs quickly, as the lifespan of a jellyfish is only a few months. The eggs develop either inside the female, or in brood pouches located on the oral arms. They also aid in the capture and ingestion of food, and may contain stinging cells.

== See also ==
- Jellyfish
- Scyphozoan
- Semaeostomeae
