= Strobilation =

Form of asexual reproduction

Strobilation or transverse fission is a form of asexual reproduction consisting of the spontaneous transverse segmentation of the body. It is observed in certain cnidarians and helminths. This mode of reproduction is characterized by high offspring output, which, in the case of the parasitic tapeworms, is of great significance.

== Strobilation in cnidarians ==
- The process starts with preliminary morphological changes. In particular, the cnidarian's tentacles tend to be reabsorbed.
- Neck-formation: transverse constrictions appear near the upper extremity of the animal. A strobilating polyp is called a strobila while the non-strobilating polyp is called a scyphistoma or scyphopolyp.
- Segmentation: the number of constriction sites increases and migrates down the body length, transforming the body into a sequence of disks. The fissures intensify until the initial body is divided into equally spaced, separate segments. The oral end of the polyp becomes the oral end of the ephyra.
- Metamorphosis: neurosecretory products of the two previous processes now disappear.

Neck-formation and segmentation are only separated for clarity purposes. In reality, the two processes are simultaneous, with segmentation to release new ephyras occurring at the upper end while neck formation spreads further down the body. Usually, a portion of the animal remains adhered to the substrate and regenerates the body.

=== Examples ===
- The moon jellyfish (Aurelia aurita) reproduces both sexually and by strobilation. This latter process occurs during the colonial polyp stage and produces either polyps or juvenile Medusae called ephyra. Strobilation tend to occur at specific periods, typically early spring. As ephyra size remains constant regardless of the polyp size, larger polyps produce more numerous ephyras.
- Some scyphozoans, such as Nausithoe aurea, cnidarians also strobilate in their solitary polyp form, producing either ephyra or planuloids. Strobilation does not happen periodically, but is thought to be induced by external stimuli, such as iodine, light regime, temperature, or food availability.

=== Induction in laboratory conditions ===
Strobilation is successfully induced in laboratory conditions by intensive feeding and temperature lowering, and also by the effect of artificial compounds.

== Strobilation in helminths ==
In cestodes, the whole body except for the head and the neck undergoes strobilation continuously, reflecting the important role reproduction plays in the parasitic mode of life. The strobilating section is called strobila, and each of its segments is a proglottid. As they mature, proglottids are disposed in the feces of the host.
