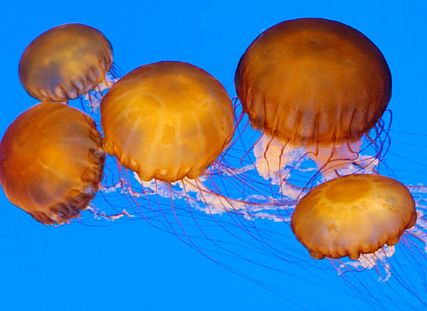
- Sea nettles, Chrysaora fuscescens
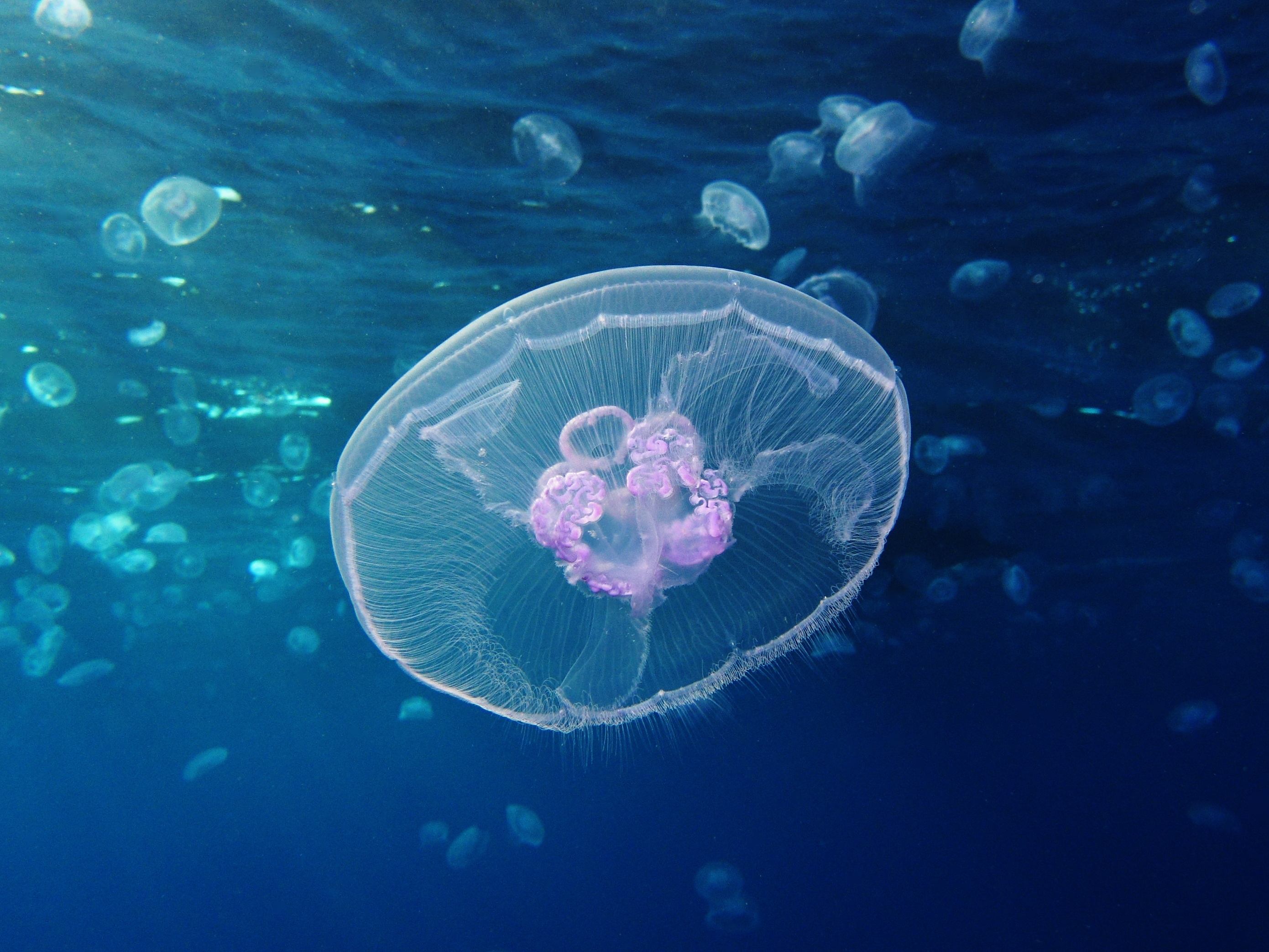

Scientific classification
- Kingdom: Animalia
- Phylum: Cnidaria
- Class: Scyphozoa
- Subclass: Discomedusae
- Order: Semaeostomeae; L. Agassiz, 1862

Families
- See text

= Semaeostomeae =

Order of jellyfish with four long, frilly oral arms

Semaeostomeae (literally "flag mouths") is an order of large jellyfish characterized by four long, frilly oral arms flanking their quadrate mouths. The umbrella is domed with scalloped margins, and the gastrovascular system consists of four unbranched pouches radiating outwards from the central stomach; no ring canal is present. They usually possess eight tentacles; four are per-radical and four are inter-radical.

== Taxonomy ==
The order consists of five families.

- Family Cyaneidae
- Family Drymonematidae
- Family Pelagiidae
- Family Phacellophoridae
- Family Ulmaridae

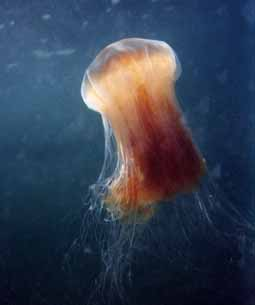

== Differentiation ==
The three traditional families, Pelagiidae, Cyaneidae, and Ulmaridae, are distinguishable by these characteristics:

- Gastrovascular cavity divided by radial septa into rhopalar and tentacular pouches
  - Pouches simple and unbranched – Pelagiidae
  - Pouches branched – Cyaneidae
- Gastrovascular system in form of unbranched and branching canals, or with anastomosing radial canals – Ulmaridae

In addition, members of the Pelagiidae have no ring canal, and the marginal tentacles arise from umbrella margin. Three genera are in this family.

== Gallery ==
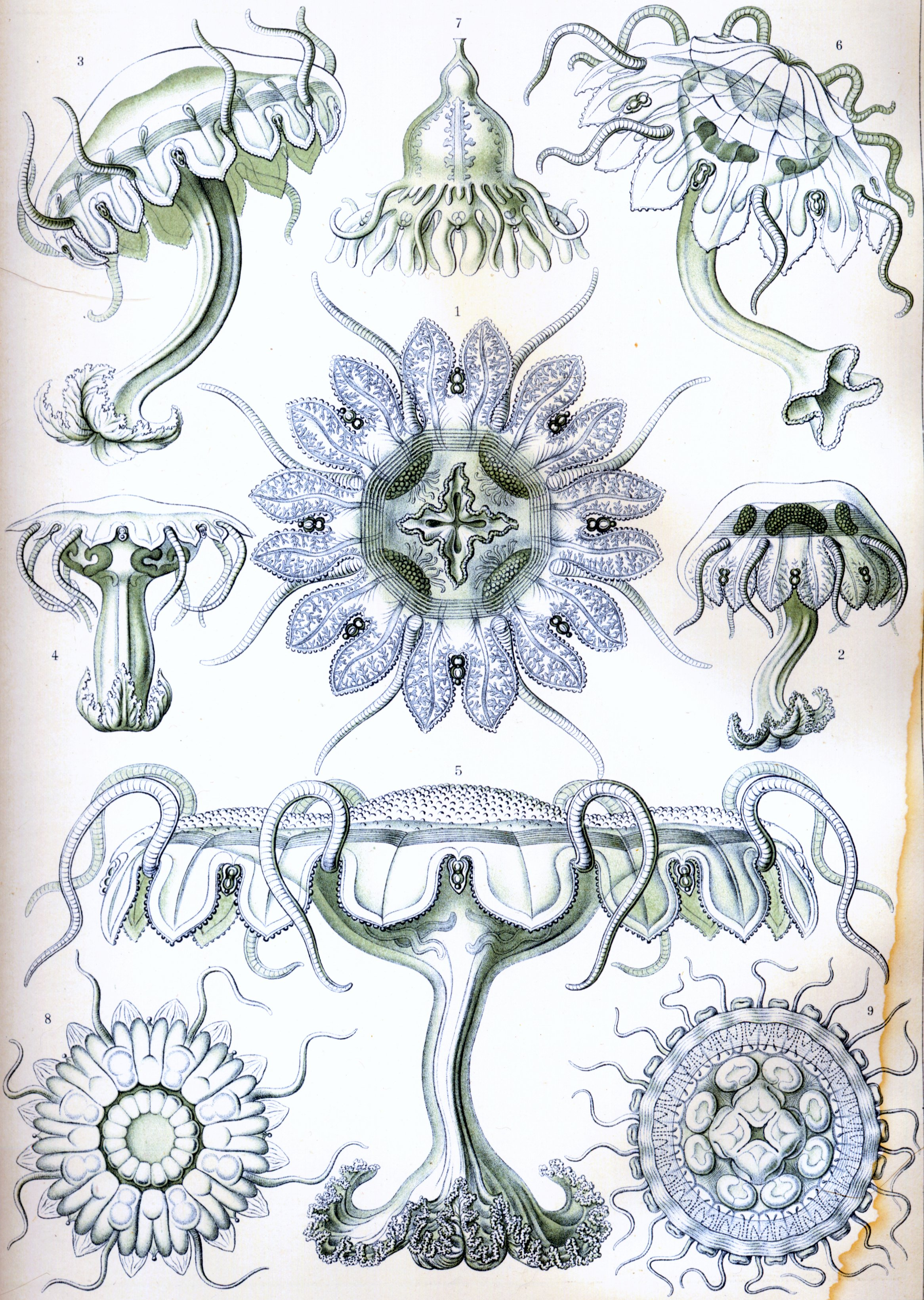

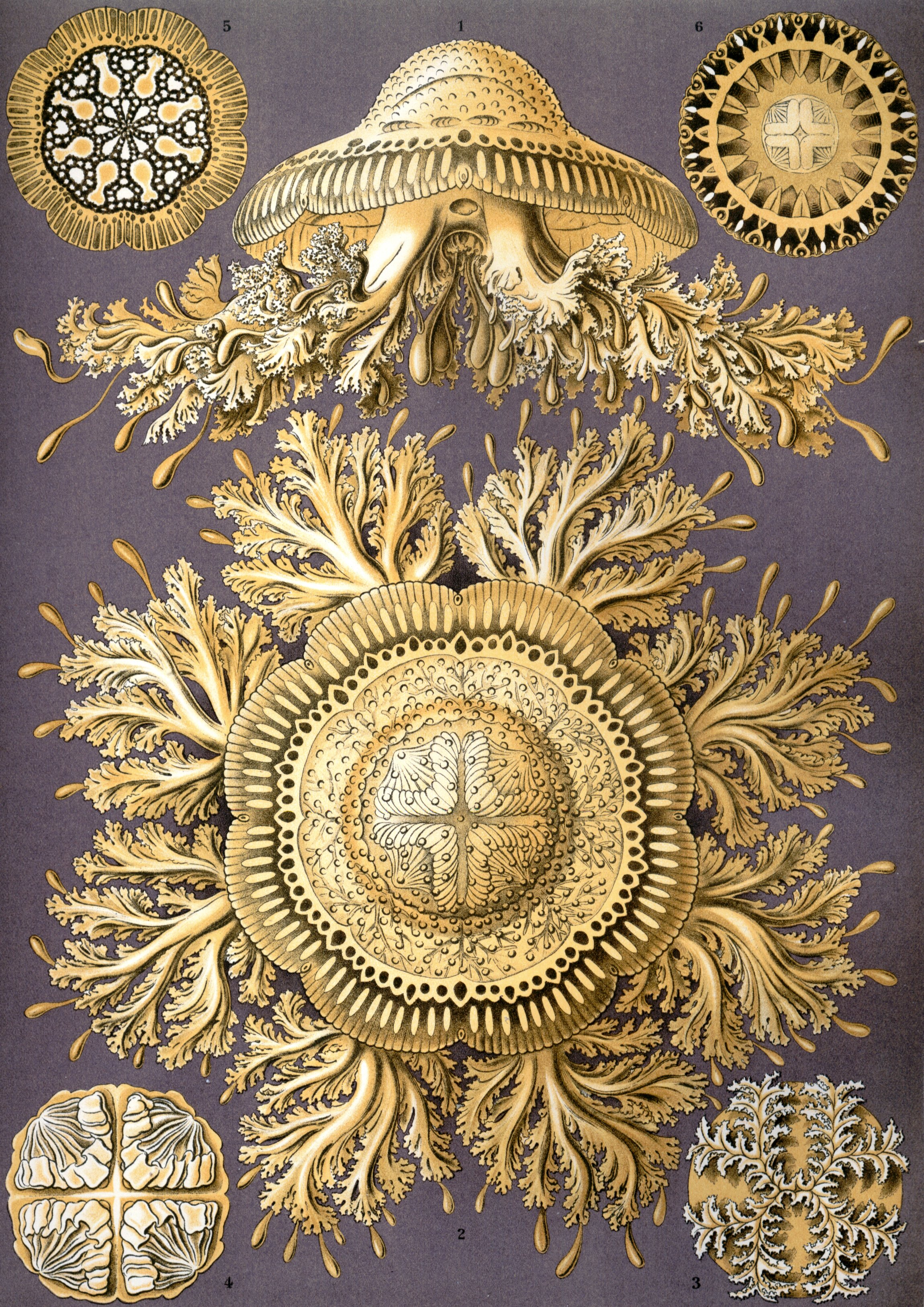

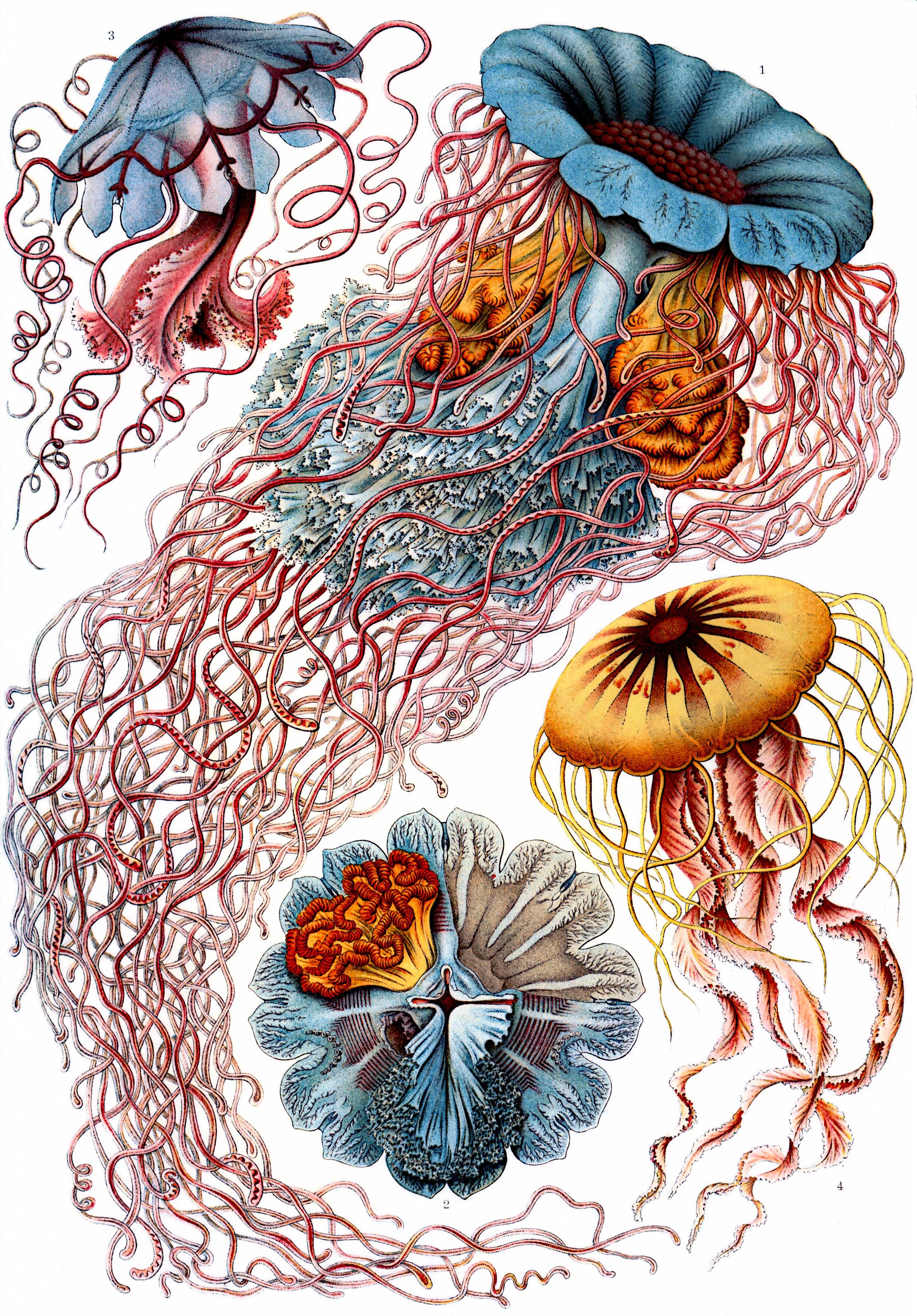
"Discomedusae" plate from Ernst Haeckel's Kunstformen der Natur, 1904
