= Deepstaria reticulum =

Scientific classification
- Domain: Eukaryota
- Kingdom: Animalia
- Phylum: Cnidaria
- Class: Scyphozoa
- Order: Semaeostomeae
- Family: Ulmaridae
- Genus: Deepstaria
- Species: D. reticulum

Binomial name
- Deepstaria reticulum Larson, Madin, and Harbison, 1988

Species of jellyfish

Deepstaria reticulum, is a jellyfish of the family Ulmaridae. It was described by Larson, Madin, and Harbison in 1988. This was the second described Deepstaria species, the first having been Deepstaria enigmatica (Russell, 1967).

== Description ==
Deepstaria reticulum has a wide, fan-like bell that is often a deep purple color, under the bell there is a small cluster of tentacles, loaded with stinging, venomous barbs like any other jellyfish. At the largest, they get about 0.7 meters long. Unlike D. enigmatica, the bell of D. reticulum is spread wide, like a thin, translucent bed sheet. The digestive tract consists of a highly branched network of canal systems spread over the entire length of the body.
