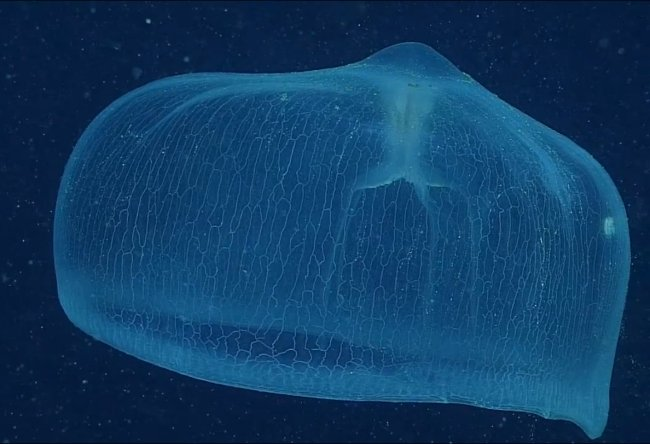

Scientific classification
- Kingdom: Animalia
- Phylum: Cnidaria
- Class: Scyphozoa
- Order: Semaeostomeae
- Family: Ulmaridae
- Genus: Deepstaria
- Species: D. enigmatica

Binomial name
- Deepstaria enigmatica Russell, 1967

= Deepstaria enigmatica =

Species of jellyfish

Deepstaria enigmatica is a very rarely seen giant jellyfish of the family Ulmaridae first described in 1967 by F. S. Russell.

== Description ==
The Deepstaria enigmatica has a wide, thin bell (up to 60 cm or 2 ft), transparent in appearance, which undulates as the jellyfish moves. They are usually found in Antarctic and near-Antarctic seas, but have been spotted in waters near the United Kingdom and Gulf of Mexico, at depths of 600–1,750 metres (1,970–5,740 ft). Unlike many other jellyfish, they lack tentacles. They also are solitary creatures, contrary to the group living style of many jellyfish.

The large bell of the jellyfish has been proposed as used for either locomotion or feeding when closed. The Deepstaria also features a geometric mesh pattern throughout its bell; this mesh, being the gastrovascular system, delivers nutrients to the entire jelly as it stretches and contracts to move and capture prey.

== Locomotion and body structure ==
Members of Deepstaria have a thin, umbrella-like membrane, a gastrovascular cavity, and lack tentacles. Deepstaria enigmatica move by peristalsis. This is done through contractions that travel in wave-like motion throughout its body. They have no tentacles, and instead use the peristaltic wave as means of locomotion and capturing prey. The jellyfish begin these wave-like contractions by opening the mouth of the bell as a wave travels through their body. A bulge forms in the center of the body and remains as long as the mouth of the bell remains closed.

== Deepstaria jelly fall ==
Deepstaria enigmatica have been observed during jelly-falls. This happens when a jellyfish carcass falls through the water column to the ocean floor. A Deepstaria enigmatica jelly fall was first observed in the lower portion of the oxygen minimum zone of the ocean. It was observed as shrimp and crabs were scavenging its carcass.

These jelly falls are advantageous to the ocean floor, causing a source of organic enrichment, similar to a whale fall; as carcasses decay away from light and the more oxygen-rich environments of the upper ocean, the animal decays far slower, providing a longer-lasting source of nutrients. The carcasses lead to a restoration of degraded mineral content in the water column. The contribution of these jelly falls is underestimated. The Deepstaria enigmatica fall shows an increase in oxygen availability and organic matter, benefitting the ecosystems found at the bottom of the ocean.

== Symbiotic relationship with isopods ==
Deepstaria open and close their bell, or stomach cavity, allowing them to both move and take in prey. This motion also allows isopods (a member of the crustacean family) to enter and live inside the jellyfish. Although the nature of this relationship is not fully understood, scientists currently believe that the isopod rides along and gains nutrients from the Deepstaria while being protected from predators. When the isopod and Deepstaria were seen together in a 1967 dive, scientists reported that the isopod was bright red, around 8 cm (3.1 in) in length, and appeared active, suggesting some form of beneficial symbiotic relationship. This dive and other findings were recorded in a 1969 article by E.G. Barham and G.V. Pickwell. Their paper identifies the isopod as member of the genus Anuropus. The authors also suggest the possibility of the symbiotic relationship being parasitic.

== Diet ==
The Deepstaria jellyfish, unlike many jellyfish, lacks tentacles of any kind, which other species of jellyfish commonly use to entrap and consume prey. Instead, Deepstaria trap prey inside their bell, where they are consumed. This method also provides for isopods, who may live inside the jellyfish's bell in a symbiotic relationship.

== Discovery ==
In the 1960s, Jacques Cousteau first discovered the Deepstaria jellyfish on a deep-sea exploration mission. He was exploring the deep ocean near Southwest Baker Island in the Deepstar 4000 submarine, which the jellyfish was named after. The Deepstaria jellyfish has been found in the Gulf of Mexico, Antarctic, and the Pacific Ocean. In all of these locations, the jellyfish was found 3,000 ft (910 m) below sea level.
