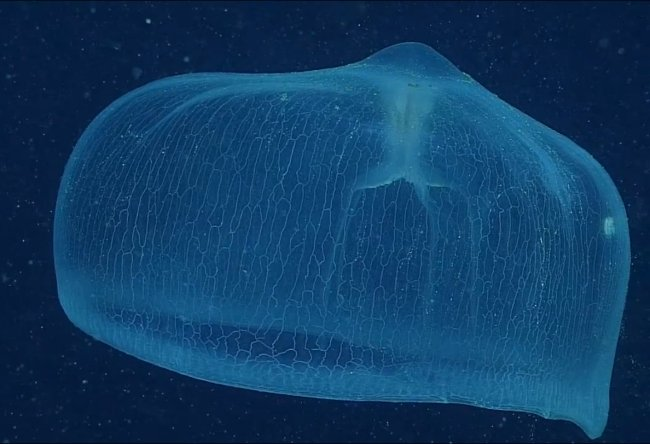
- A large Deepstaria jellyfish

Scientific classification
- Kingdom: Animalia
- Phylum: Cnidaria
- Class: Scyphozoa
- Order: Semaeostomeae
- Family: Ulmaridae
- Genus: Deepstaria; Russell, 1967

Type species
- Deepstaria enigmatica Russell, 1967

Species
- See text

= Deepstaria =

Genus of jellyfishes

Deepstaria is a genus of jellyfish known for their thin, sheet-like bodies. The genus is named after the Deep Star 4000, which collected the holotype of the type species, D. enigmatica. This species is commonly found at depths of 600 to 1750 meters deep.

== Description ==
Characteristic features of this genus include: a large, thin umbrella, lack of tentacles, and long oral arms. Due to lack of tentacles and large size, Deepstaria captures prey by encapsulating the prey with its whole body and digesting through their gastro-vascular canal system, allowing for proper distribution of nutrition, circulation of oxygen, and waste removal.

== Species list ==
As of 2017, WoRMS recognizes two species within the genus:

- Deepstaria enigmatica Russell, 1967
- Deepstaria reticulum Larson, Madin & Harbison, 1988
