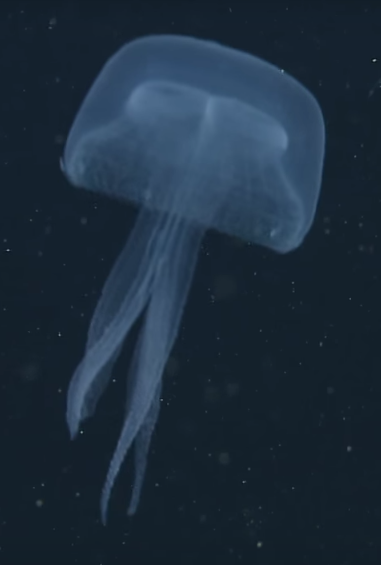

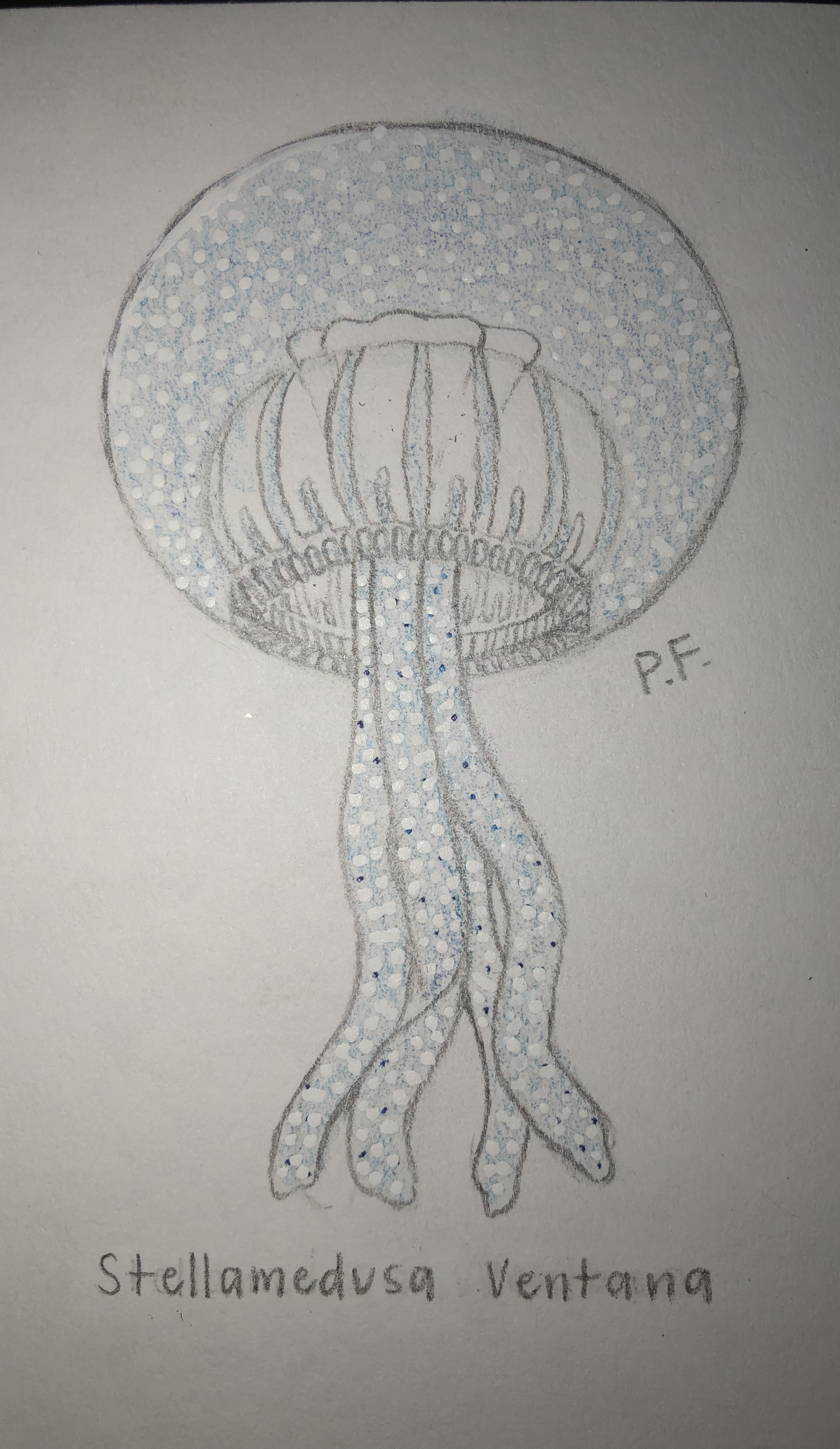
- Drawing

Scientific classification
- Kingdom: Animalia
- Phylum: Cnidaria
- Class: Scyphozoa
- Order: Semaeostomeae
- Family: Ulmaridae
- Subfamily: Stellamedusinae; Raskoff & Matsumoto, 2004
- Genus: Stellamedusa; Raskoff & Matsumoto, 2004
- Species: S. ventana

Binomial name
- Stellamedusa ventana Raskoff & Matsumoto, 2004

= Stellamedusa =

Genus of jellyfishes

Stellamedusa is a genus of jellyfish. The genus is monotypic with a single species recognized, Stellamedusa ventana.

The species was first described in the Journal of the Marine Biological Association in 2004 by Kevin Raskoff and George Matsumoto of the Monterey Bay Aquarium Research Institute. As of February 2004, seven specimens have been observed, five off the California coast in Monterey Bay and two in the Gulf of California. Unlike most medusae, they lack marginal tentacles. Specimens so far found reach almost 10 cm in diameter, which is large for a scyphomedusa. The bell is blue-white in colour. The exumbrella is white, and this and the four oral arms are covered with large nematocyst-laden projections filled with stinging cells, enabling the jelly to capture food items of a variety of sizes; it seems to prefer large prey, up to half its size, which is unusual in jellies that capture prey with their bells rather than with tentacles. The bumpy appearance that the stinging cells give to the jelly led to its common name. The species name comes from the remotely operated vehicle (ROV) Ventana, a deep-diving robot submarine that first recorded the jelly on video in 1990.

Stellamedusa ventana has so far been observed only at mesopelagic depths, i.e. between 150 and 550 meters. At these depths, sunlight does not penetrate, but there is still a reasonable amount of oxygen. Many species of jellyfishes live at this level, and it is likely that S. ventana feeds primarily on other jellies. Another large jellyfish discovered by the same researchers is Tiburonia granrojo.
