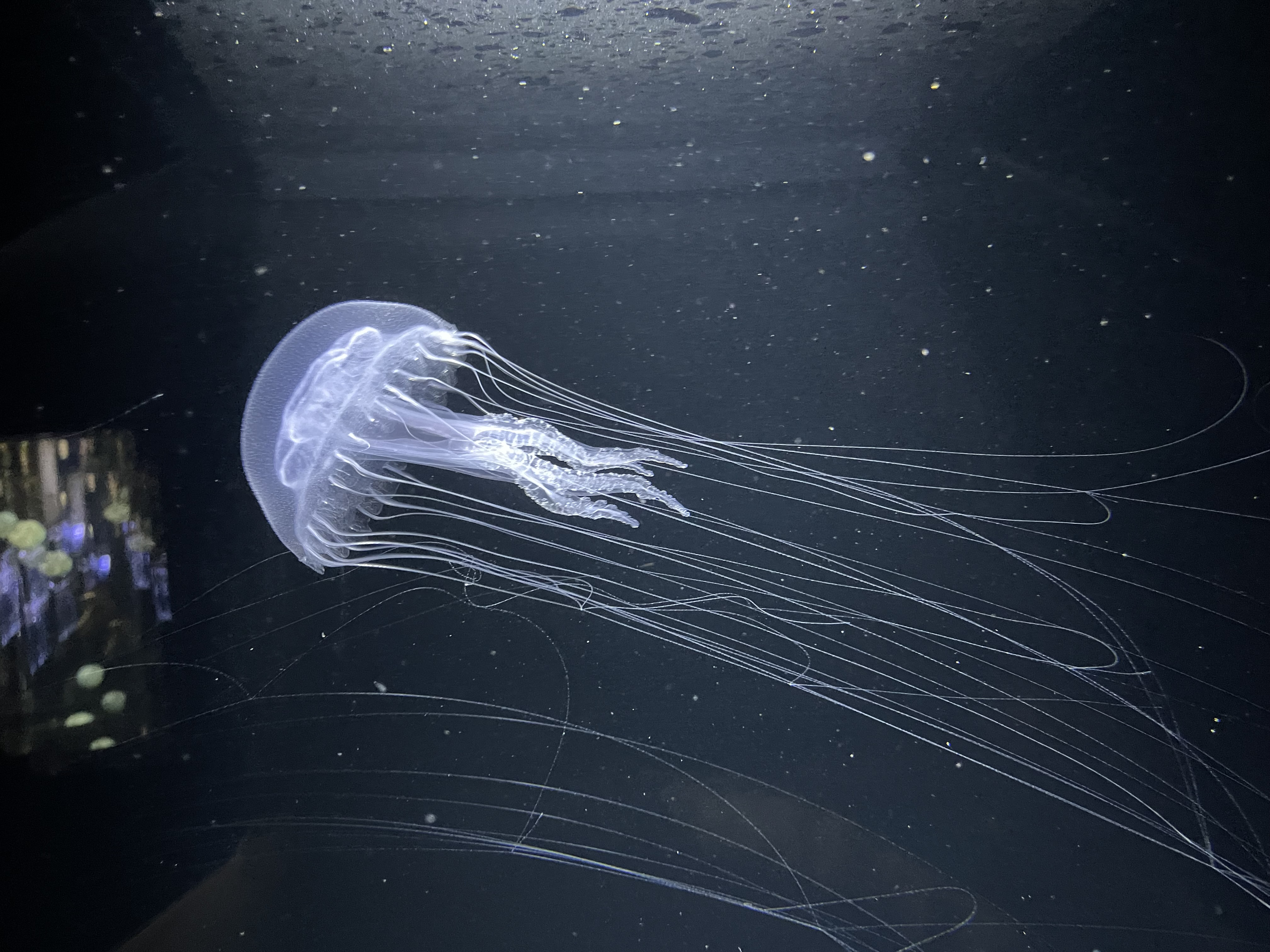
- Parumbrosa polylobata
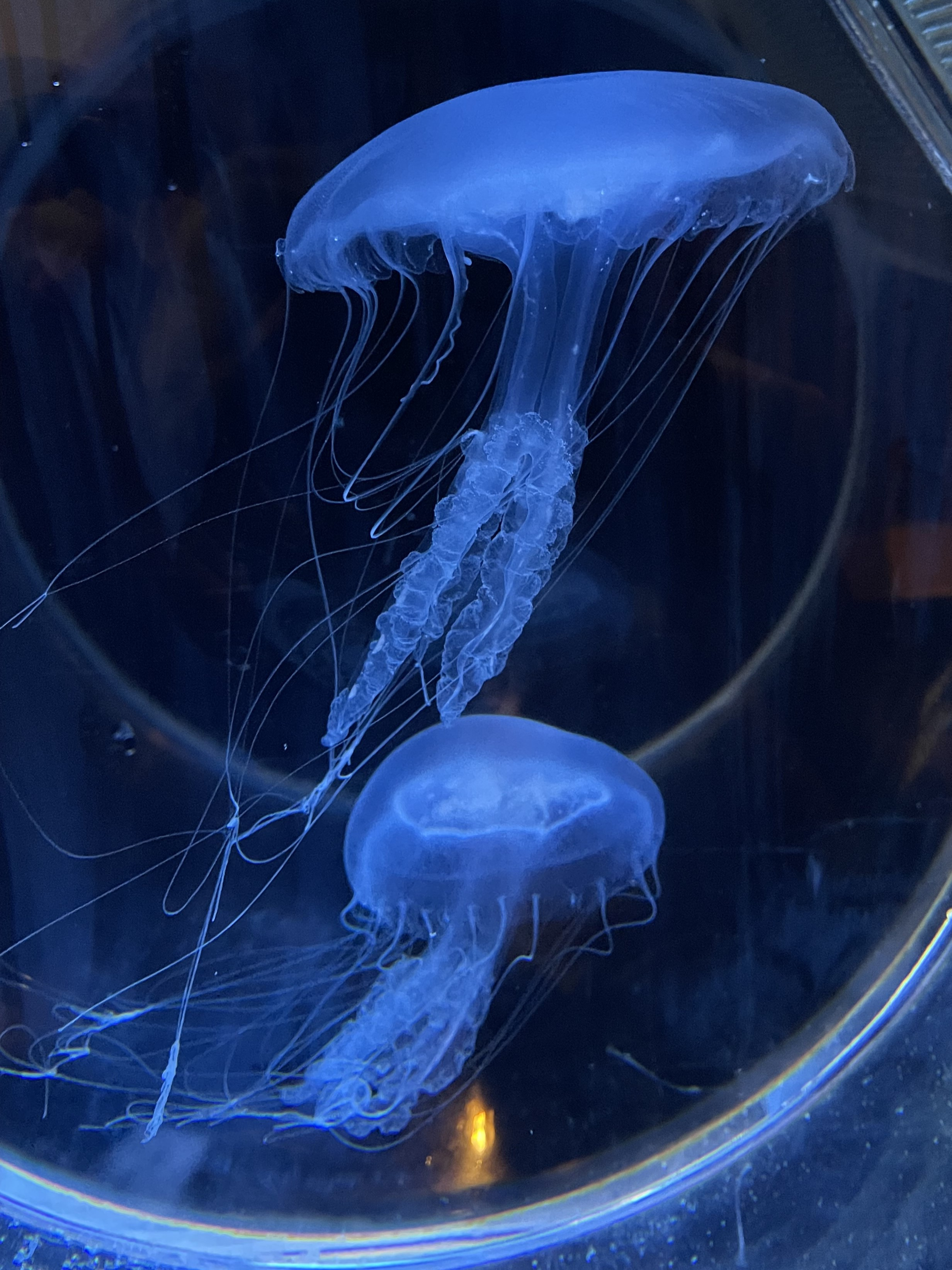

Scientific classification
- Domain: Eukaryota
- Kingdom: Animalia
- Phylum: Cnidaria
- Class: Scyphozoa
- Order: Semaeostomeae
- Family: Ulmaridae
- Genus: Parumbrosa; Kishinouye, 1910
- Species: P. polylobata

Binomial name
- Parumbrosa polylobata Kishinouye, 1910

= Parumbrosa =

Monotypic genus of jellyfish

Parumbrosa is a genus of jellyfish in the family Ulmaridae that contains one species, Parumbrosa polylobata. It lives in the northwest pacific of Japan in pelagic and subtropical marine environments. It has a wide and flat disk that can grow up to a maximum of 16 cm (6.3 in) wide. The tentacles are relatively long and are colorless.

It is harmless to humans.
