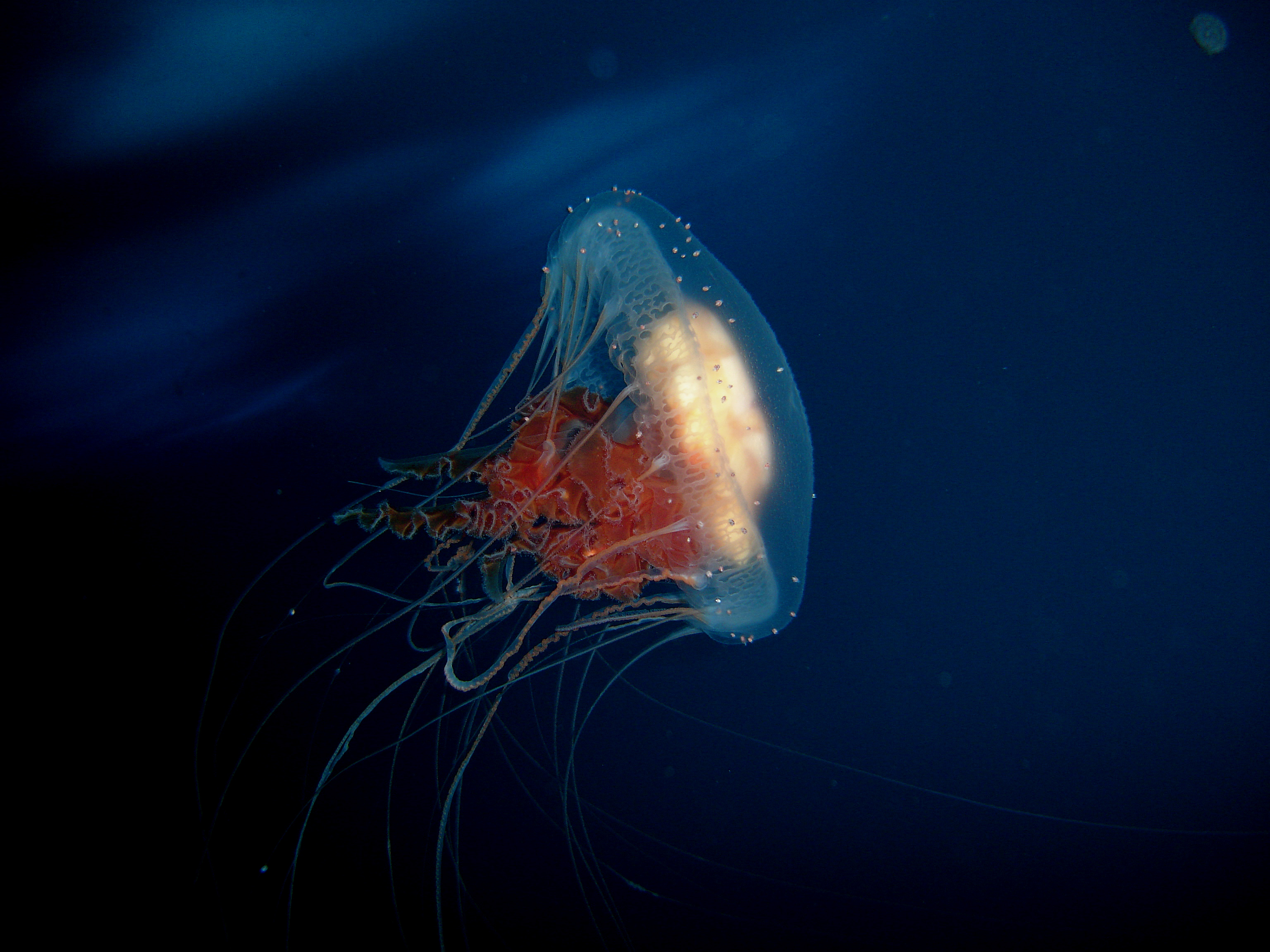
- Diplulmaris antarctica
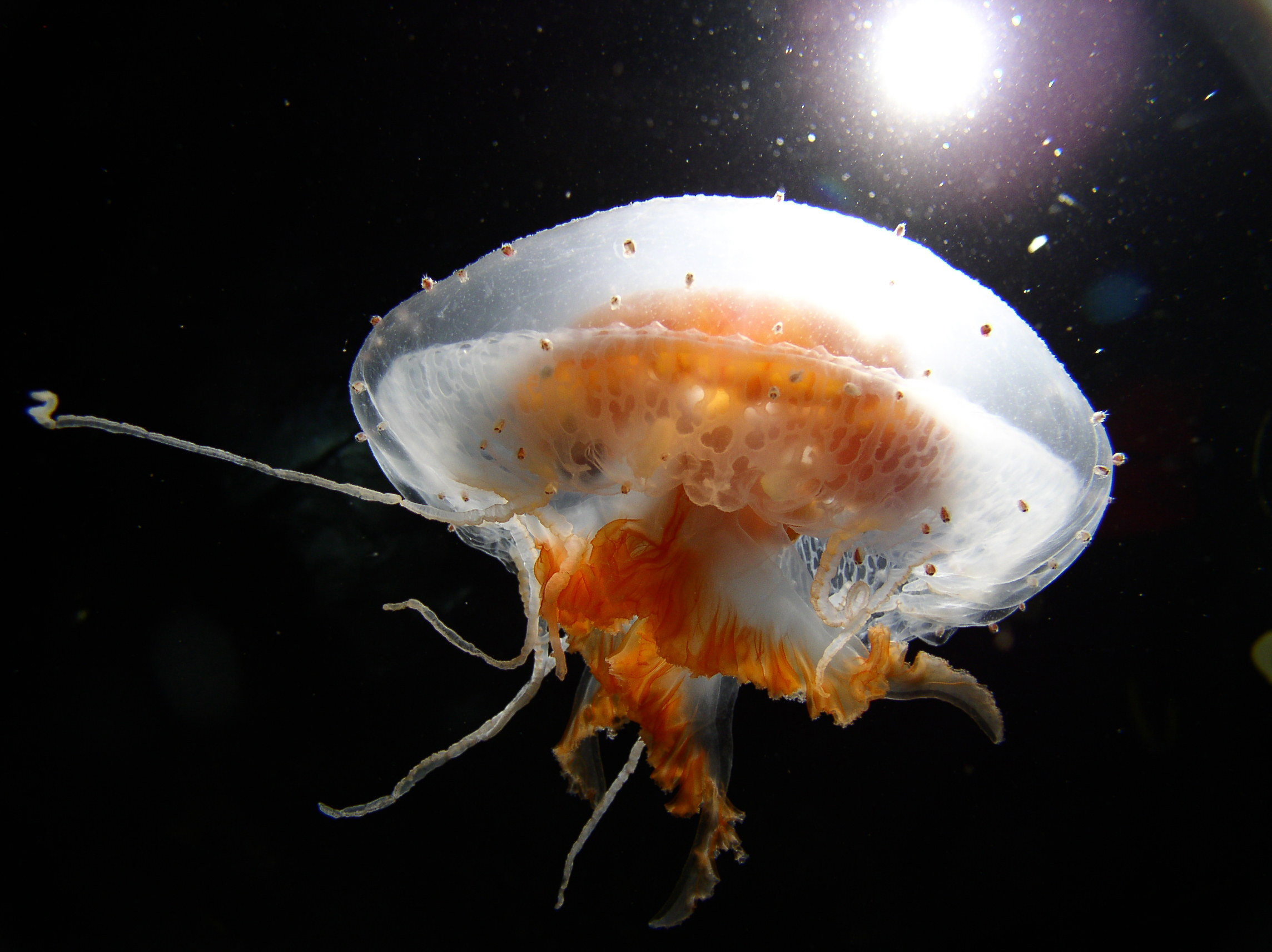

Scientific classification
- Kingdom: Animalia
- Phylum: Cnidaria
- Class: Scyphozoa
- Order: Semaeostomeae
- Family: Ulmaridae
- Genus: Diplulmaris

Type species
- Diplulmaris antarctica Maas, 1908

Synonyms
- Ulmaropsis Vanhöffen, 1908

= Diplulmaris =

Genus of jellyfish

Diplulmaris is a genus of jellyfish in the family Ulmaridae that contains two species, Diplulmaris antarctica and Diplulmaris malayensis. It lives in the deep water of southwest Atlantic and southern oceans in pelagic and polar marine environments. Its depth ranges from 0 meters at the surface to around 500 meters. It is 4.2 cm wide.

== Species ==
- Diplulmaris antarctica
- Diplulmaris malayensis
