= Aurosa =

Scientific classification
- Kingdom: Animalia
- Phylum: Cnidaria
- Class: Scyphozoa
- Order: Semaeostomeae
- Family: Ulmaridae
- Genus: Aurosa; Haeckel, 1880
- Species: A. furcata

Binomial name
- Aurosa furcata Haeckel, 1880

Genus of cnidarians

Aurosa is a genus of cnidarians belonging to the family Ulmaridae. It is monotypic, containing the sole species Aurosa furcata.
