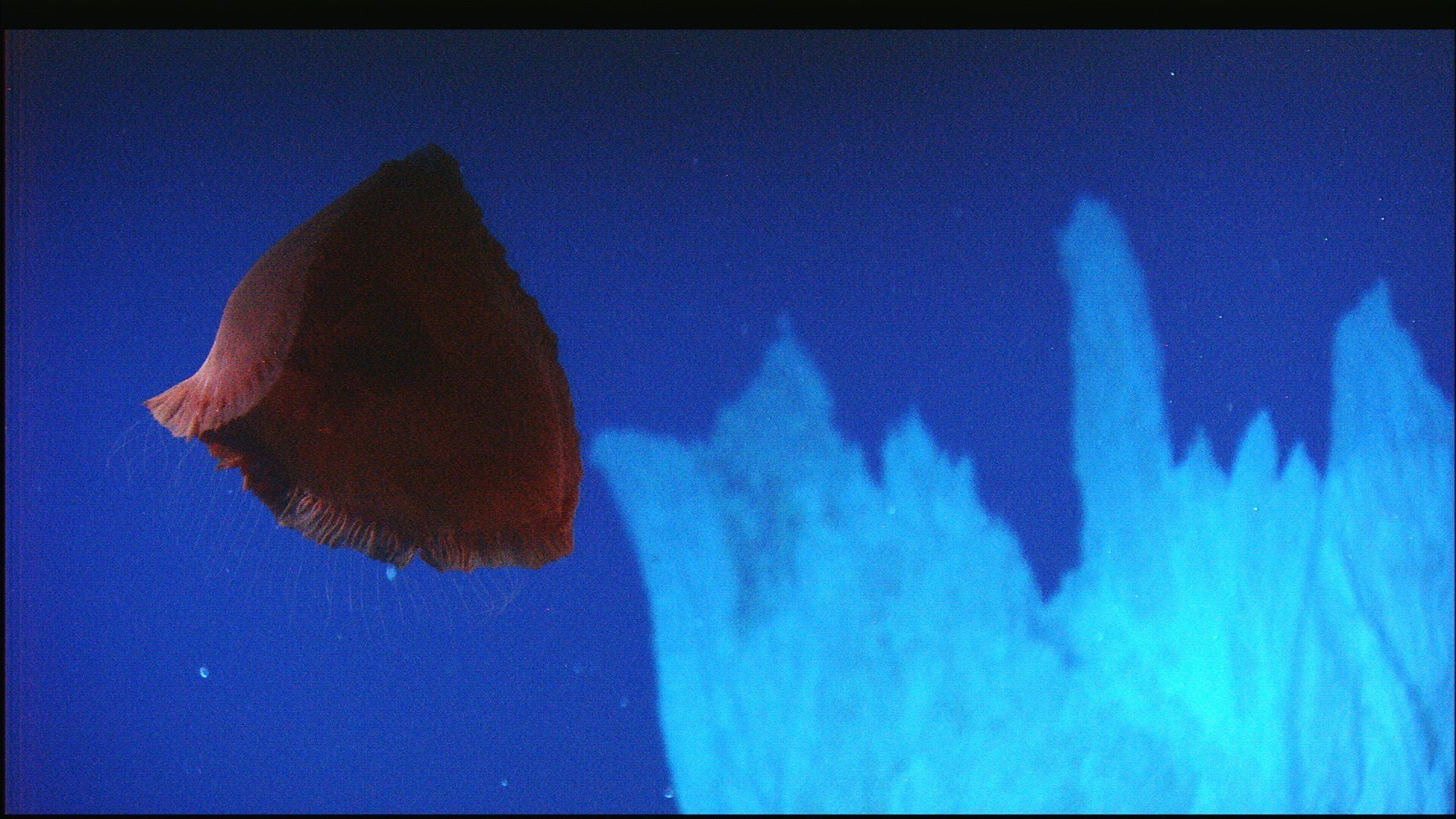

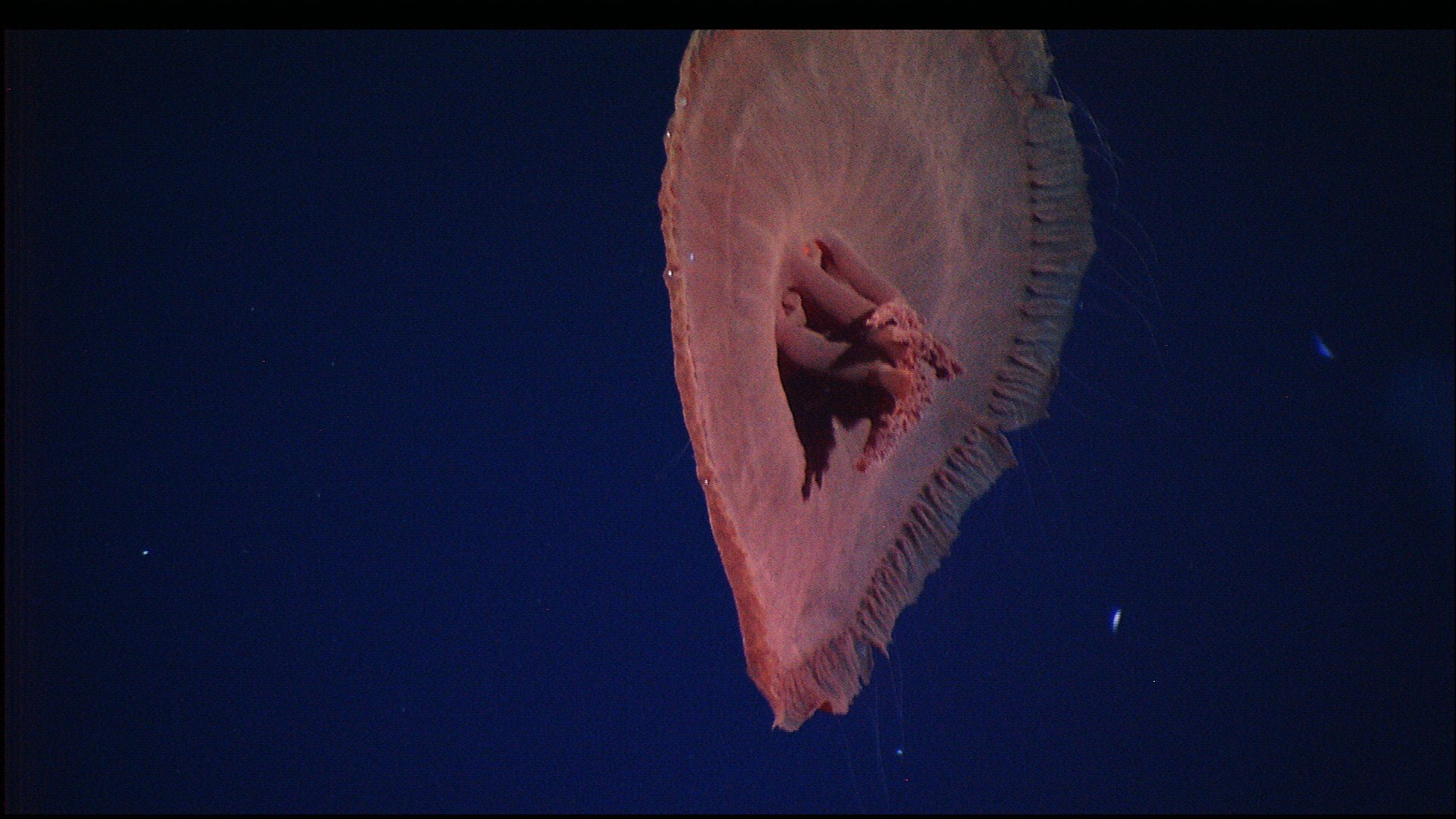
- Possibly P. rufescens

Scientific classification
- Kingdom: Animalia
- Phylum: Cnidaria
- Class: Scyphozoa
- Order: Semaeostomeae
- Family: Ulmaridae
- Genus: Poralia; Vanhöffen, 1902
- Species: P. rufescens

Binomial name
- Poralia rufescens Vanhöffen, 1902

= Poralia =

Genus of jellyfishes

Poralia is a genus of jellyfish in the family Ulmaridae. It is a monotypic genus containing a single species, Poralia rufescens. This jellyfish is pelagic, and is found in deep water in most of the world's oceans.

In 2021, a NOAA expedition discovered a possible additional Poralia species in the Atlantic Ocean.

== Description ==
Poralia rufescens has a bell about 9 cm (3.5 in) in diameter. It has 30 marginal tentacles interspersed with 15 rhopalia (sensory organs). The lappets (flaps) are rectangular in outline and are all the same length, the rhopalial lappets having deep clefts and the tentacular lappets shallow clefts. This jellyfish is very fragile and most specimens examined have been damaged.

== Distribution ==
The distribution of this meso-bathypelagic species is not well delineated. Before 1962, only eleven damaged specimens from the North Atlantic had been examined, mostly brought up from waters deeper than 1,500 m (4,900 ft). It seems to be quite common in the vicinity of Bermuda and the Bahamas, mostly in the lowest 100 m (300 ft) of the water column.

In a study of deep sea jellyfish in the Southern Ocean performed by the USNS Eltanin, the coronates Periphylla periphylla, Atolla wyvillei and Atolla chuni were the most common species found, comprising over 90% of the individuals sampled. Po. rufescens was the most common semaeostome, making up 2% of the collection. A study using a remotely operated vehicle in deep water in the Japan Trench showed that Po. rufescens was the most common scyphomedusan there. It has also been recorded from several locations in the eastern Pacific Ocean, including off the coast of southern California.

== Ecology ==
The biology and ecology of the meso-bathypelagic jellyfishes is poorly known. Their gelatinous bodies tend to have a low proportion of protein; P. rufescens has a protein content of 0.1% of the body dry weight as compared to an average of 4% for all gelatinous taxa. Some parts of the body have a higher nitrogenous content than others, and in the Pacific, leatherback sea turtles, whose diet consists largely of jellyfish, have been observed feeding on their gonads and tentacles, the parts which have the highest nutritional values.

Poralia specimens have been shown to be bioluminescent, producing blue light. The function of this is not known for this species.
