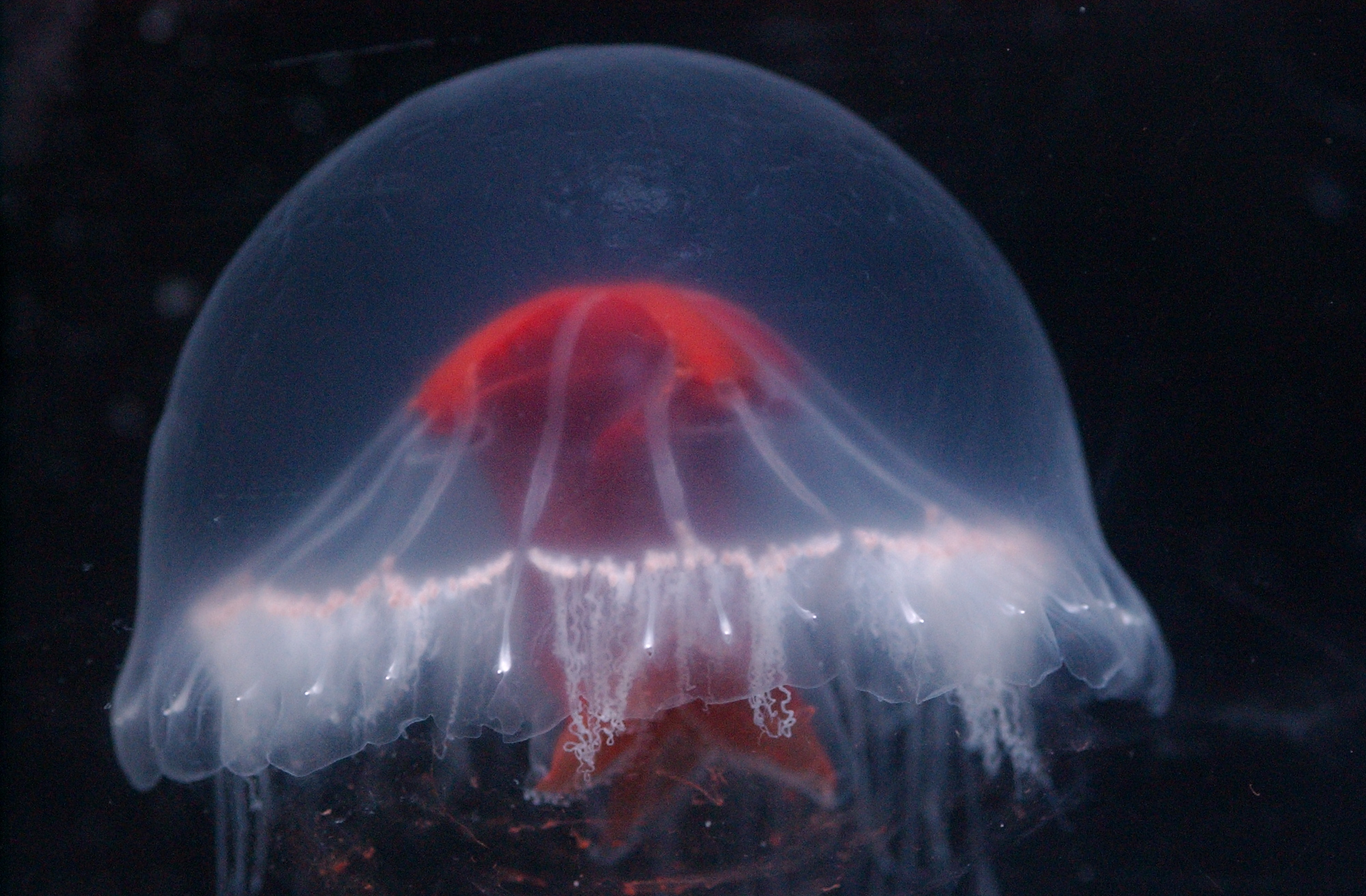
- Santjordia pagesi holotype
- Observation and capture of the Santjordia pagesi holotype

Scientific classification
- Kingdom: Animalia
- Phylum: Cnidaria
- Class: Scyphozoa
- Order: Semaeostomeae
- Family: Ulmaridae
- Genus: Santjordia; Lindsay et al., 2023
- Species: S. pagesi

Binomial name
- Santjordia pagesi Lindsay et al., 2023

= Santjordia =

Santjordia pagesi

Genus of jellyfish

Santjordia is a genus of jellyfish in the family Ulmaridae. It is monotypic, being represented by the single species Santjordia pagesi discovered in the waters of Smith Island in Japan.

== Etymology ==
Santjordia is named after the Catalan term for Saint George's Cross whose shape and color resemble that of the stomach base of Santjordia pagesi.

== Gallery ==
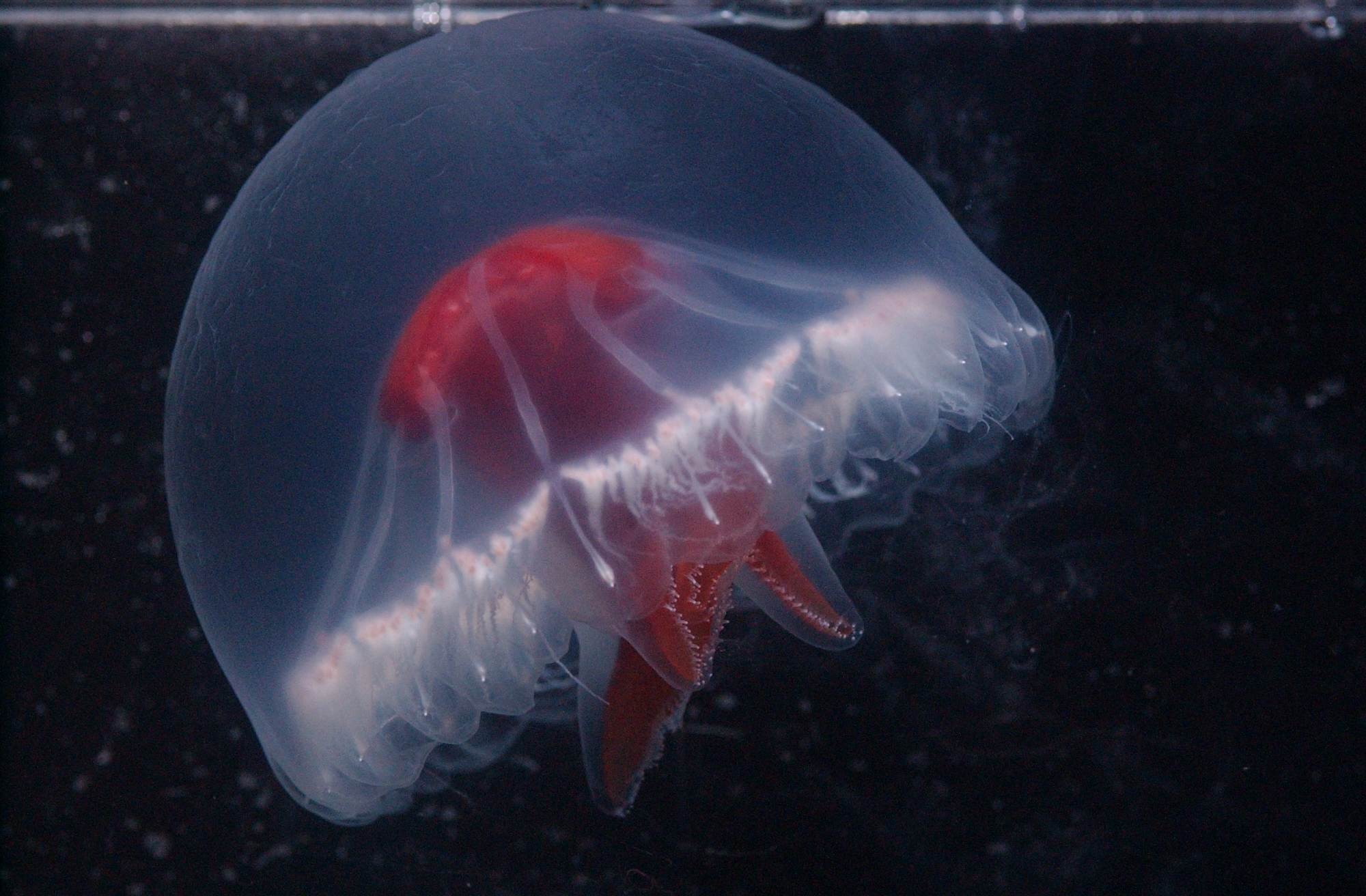
Lateral view

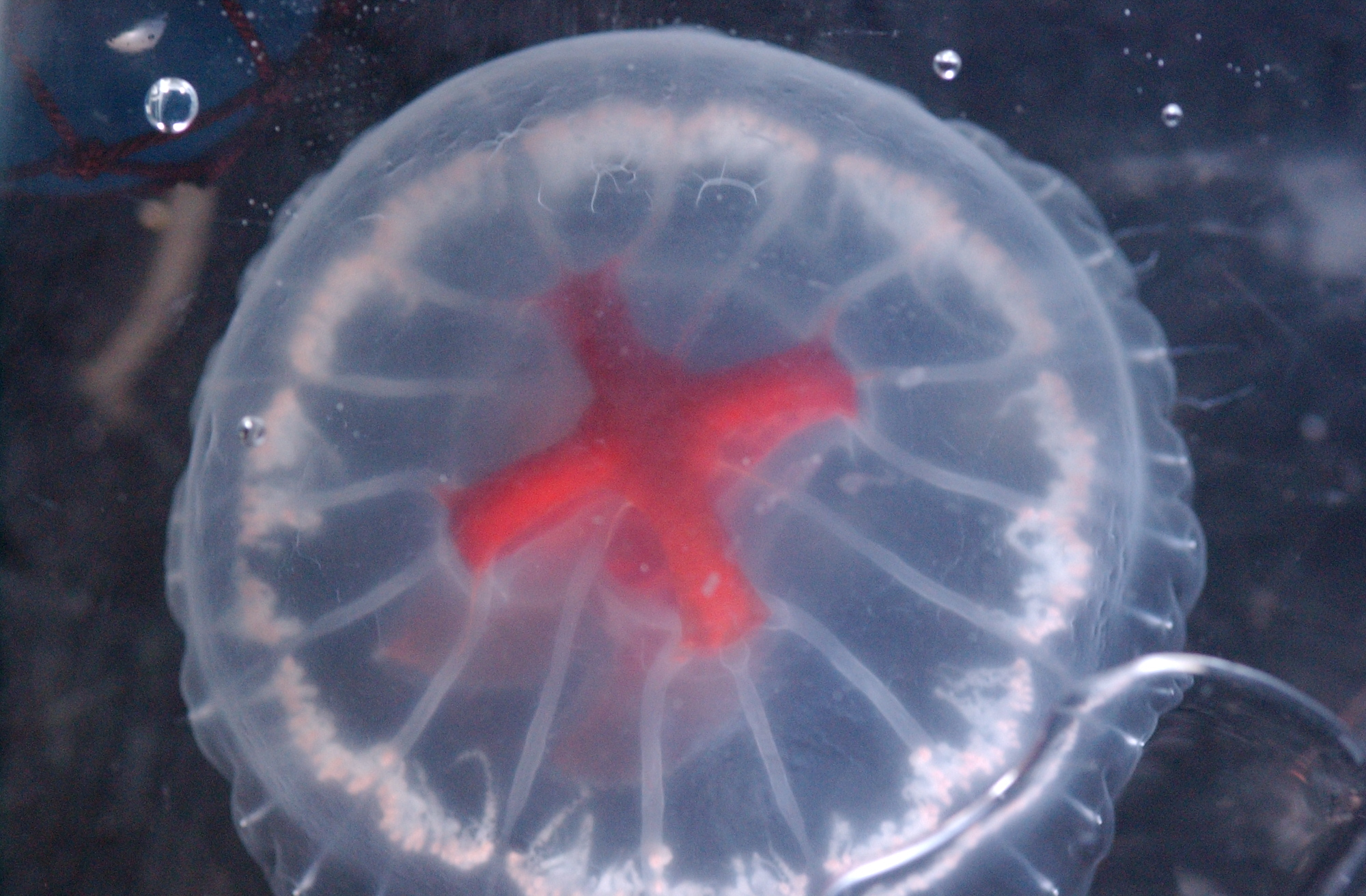
Aboral view

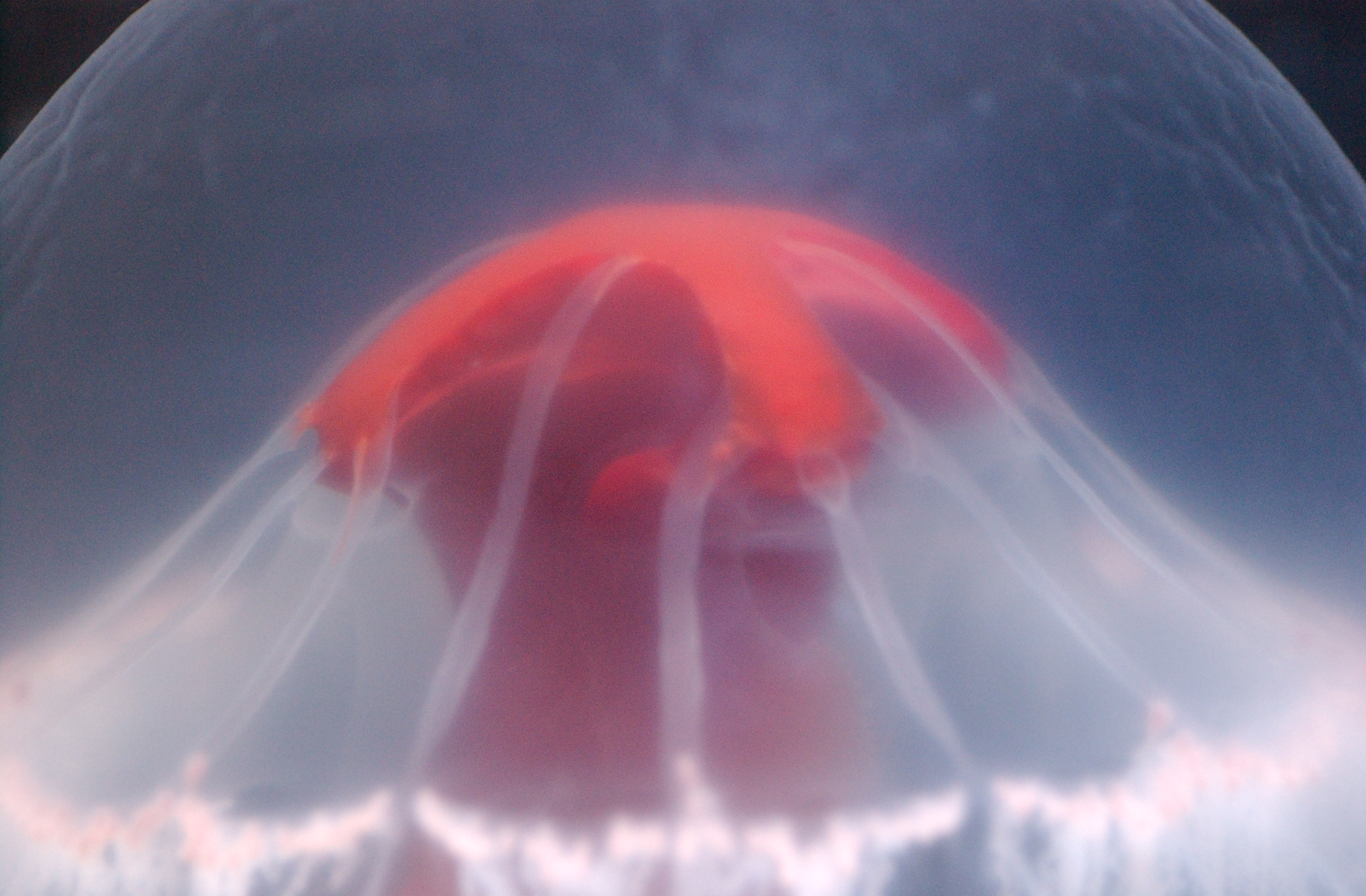
Close-up

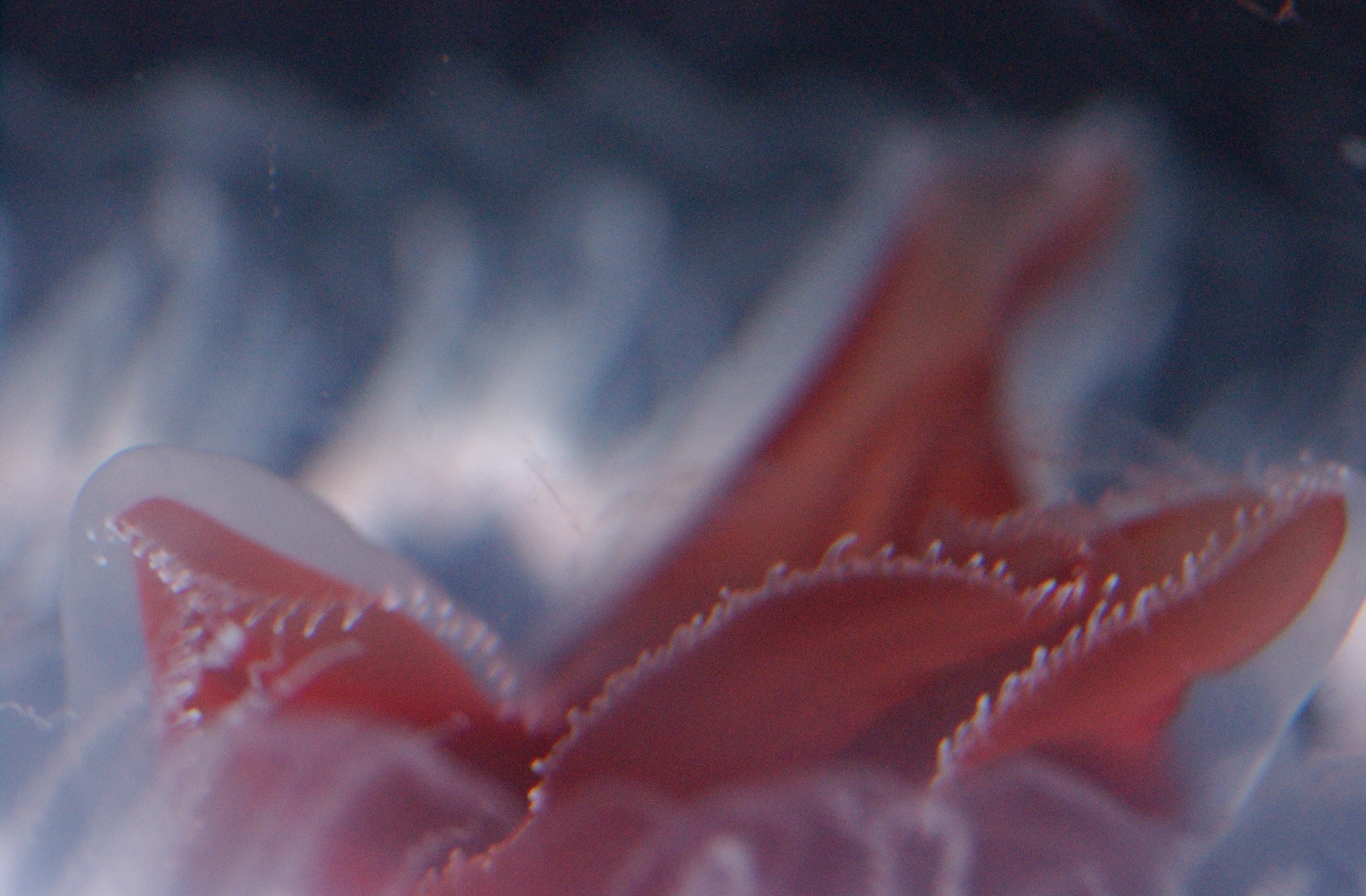
Oral arms
