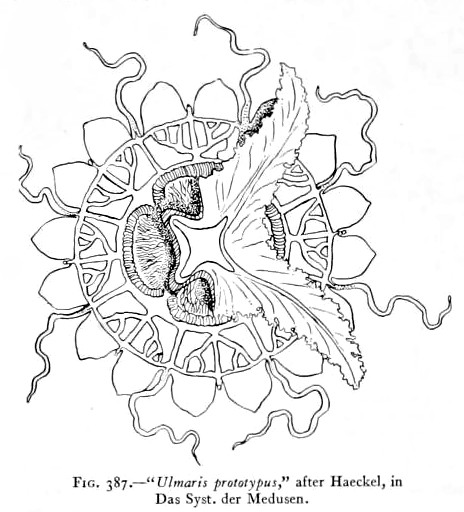

Scientific classification
- Domain: Eukaryota
- Kingdom: Animalia
- Phylum: Cnidaria
- Class: Scyphozoa
- Order: Semaeostomeae
- Family: Ulmaridae
- Genus: Ulmaris

Type species
- Ulmaris prototypus Haeckel, 1880

= Ulmaris =

Genus of jellyfishes

Ulmaris is a genus of jellyfish in the family Ulmaridae.

== Species ==
Ulmaris comprises two species:

- Ulmaris prototypus
- Ulmaris snelliussi

== Distribution ==
Ulmaris is found in marine environments.
