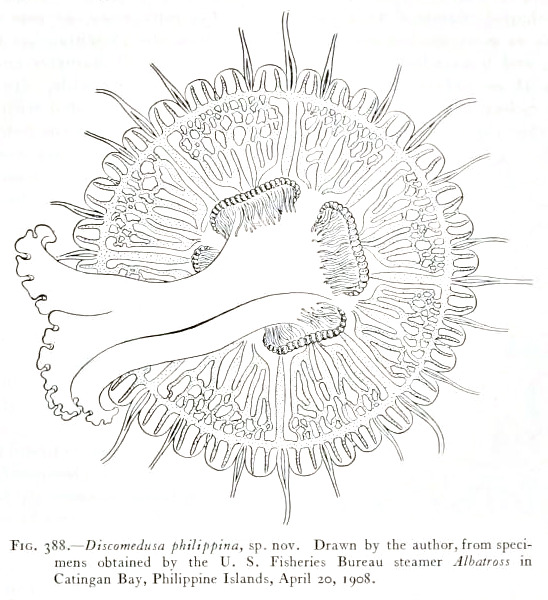
- Discomedusa philippina

Scientific classification
- Domain: Eukaryota
- Kingdom: Animalia
- Phylum: Cnidaria
- Class: Scyphozoa
- Order: Semaeostomeae
- Family: Ulmaridae
- Genus: Discomedusa

Type species
- Discomedusa lobata Claus, 1877

Species
- Discomedusa lobata Claus, 1877; Discomedusa philippina Mayer, 1910

= Discomedusa =

Genus of jellyfishes

Discomedusa is a genus of jellyfish in the family Ulmaridae.
