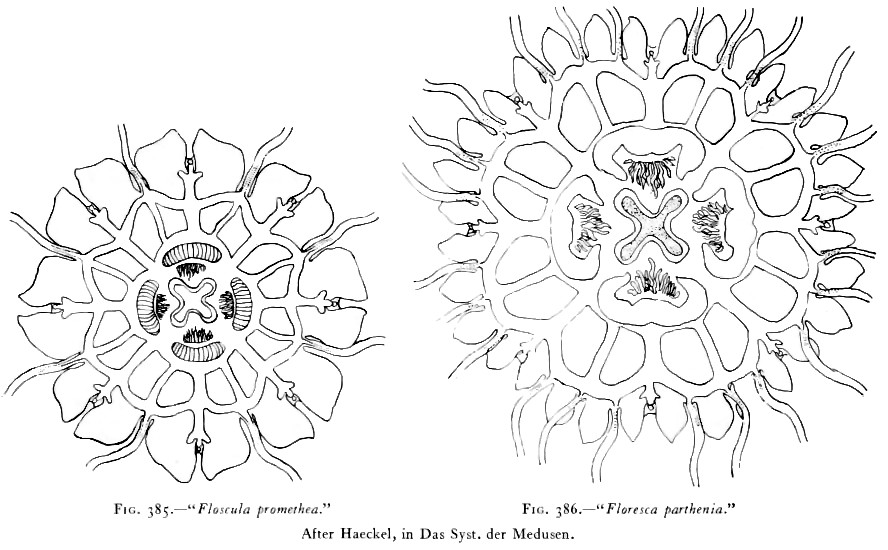

Scientific classification
- Kingdom: Animalia
- Phylum: Cnidaria
- Class: Scyphozoa
- Order: Semaeostomeae
- Family: Ulmaridae
- Genus: Floresca
- Species: F. parthenia

Binomial name
- Floresca parthenia Haeckel, 1880

= Floresca =

Genus of jellyfishes

Floresca is a genus of jellyfish in the family Ulmaridae. It is monotypic with the type species Floresca parthenia.
