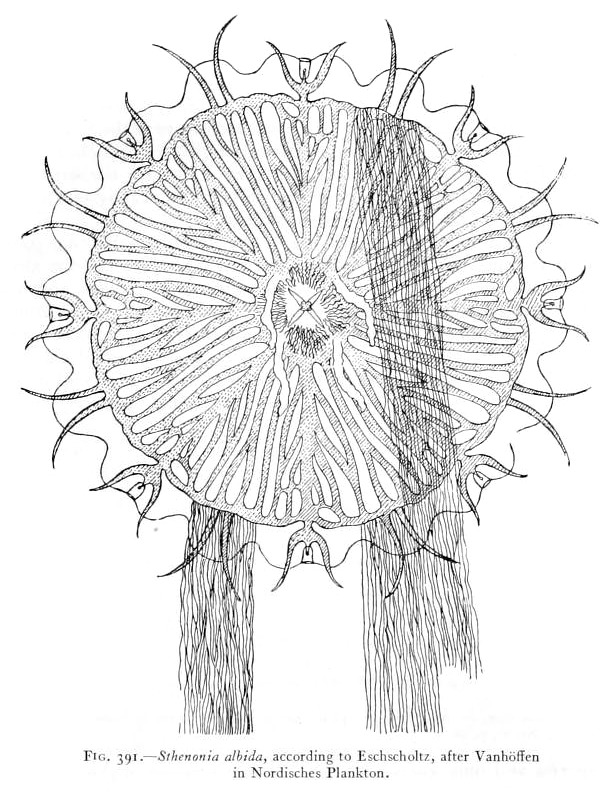
- Sthenonia albida

Scientific classification
- Domain: Eukaryota
- Kingdom: Animalia
- Phylum: Cnidaria
- Class: Scyphozoa
- Order: Semaeostomeae
- Family: Ulmaridae
- Genus: Sthenonia

Type species
- Sthenonia albida Eschscholtz, 1829

= Sthenonia =

Genus of jellyfishes

Sthenonia is a genus of jellyfish in the family Ulmaridae. It contains one species making it a monophyletic group, that species is Sthenonia albida. It is located in the northwest pacific near Russia in Pelagic and subtropical marine environments. It's has a overall disk shape that is 30 cm wide. It has a small stomach.
