= Smith Island (Japan) =

Volcanic island in the Philippine Sea

Sumisu Island
Native name: Sumisu-tō (須美寿島)
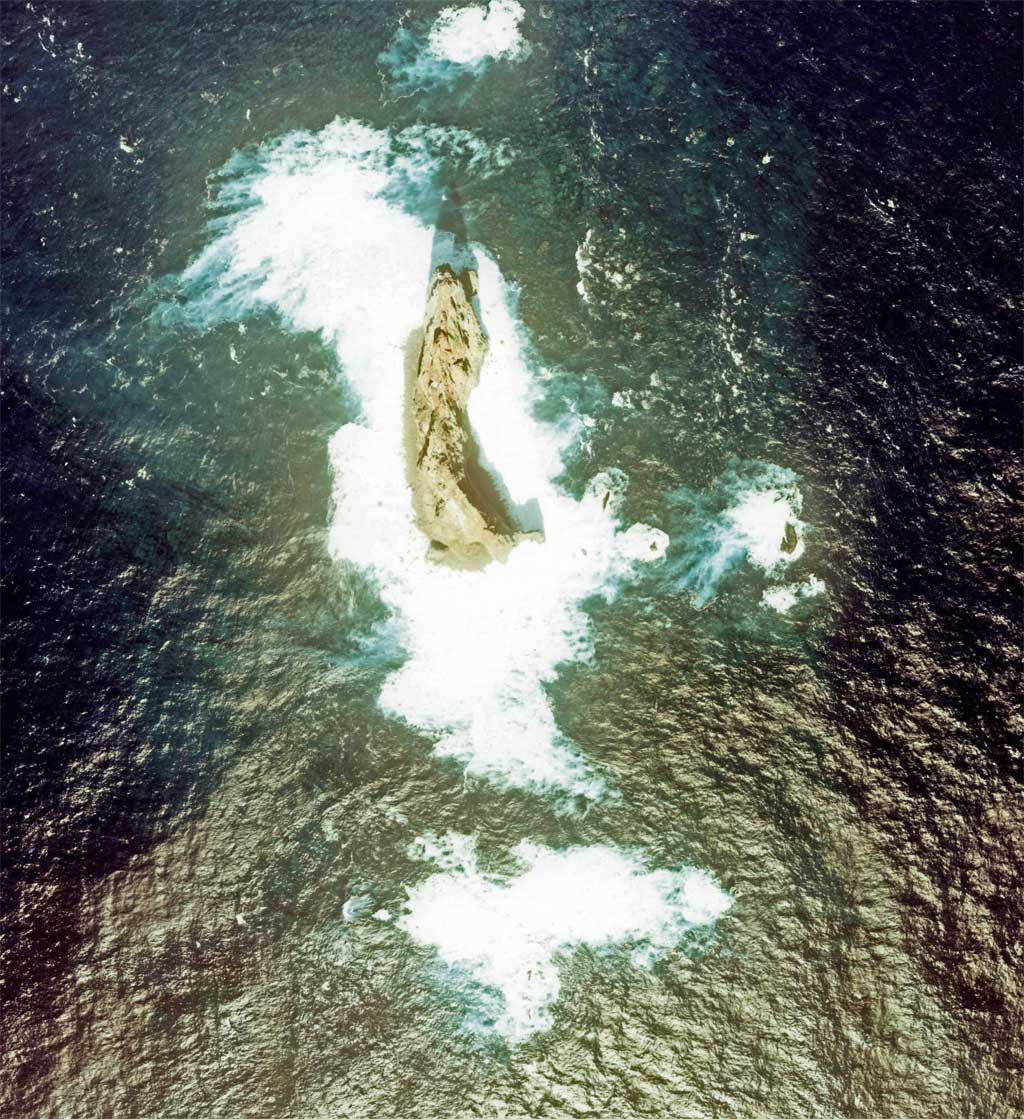

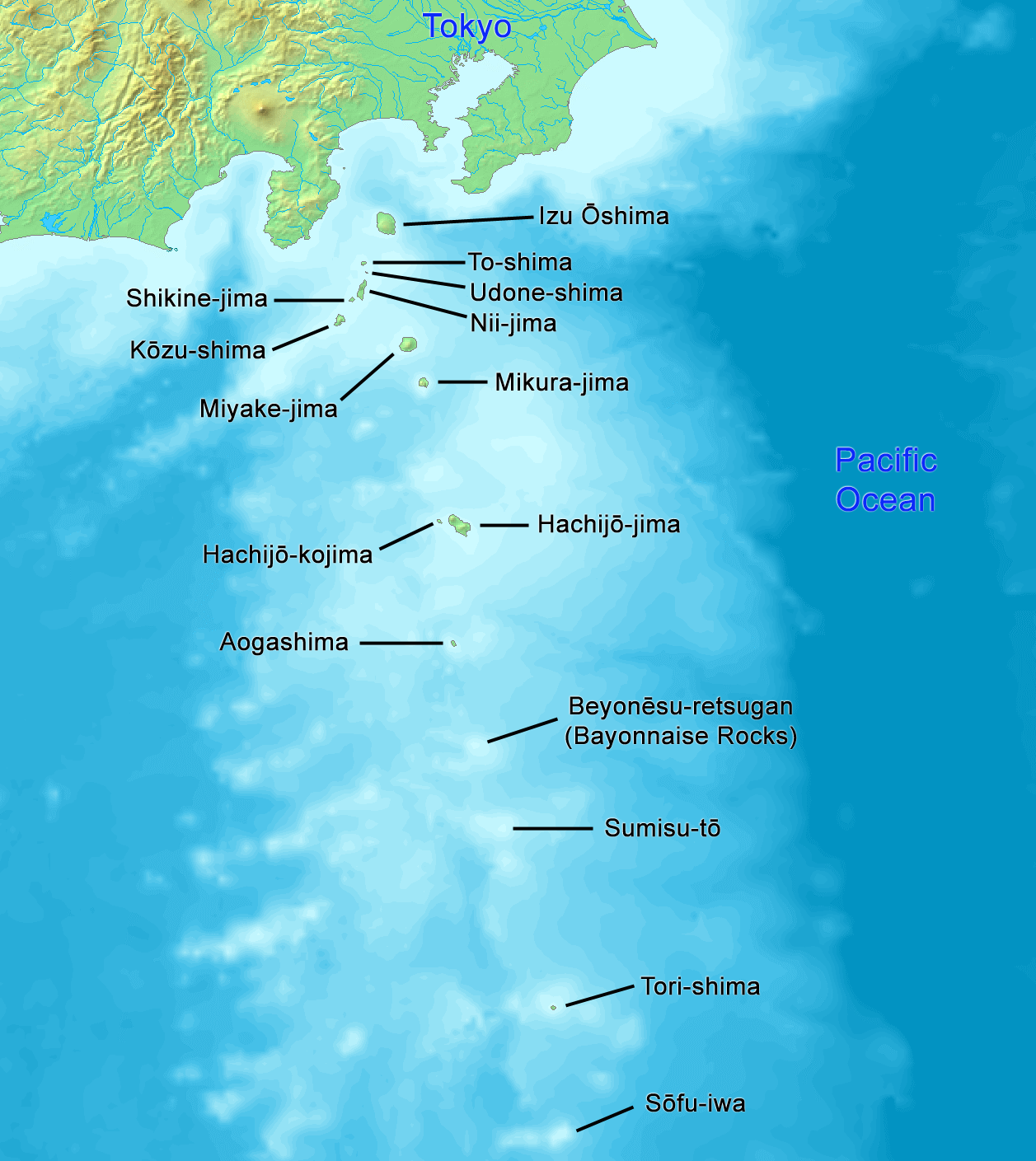

Geography
- Location: Izu Islands
- Coordinates: 31°26′20″N 140°03′03″E
- Archipelago: Izu Islands
- Area: 30,000 m^{2} (320,000 sq ft)
- Highest elevation: 134 m (440 ft)

Administration
- Japan
- Prefecture: Tokyo
- Subprefecture: Hachijō Subprefecture

Demographics
- Population: 0

Sumisu Island (須美寿島, Sumisu-tō) is a volcanic, deserted island located in the Philippine Sea approximately 110 kilometres (68 mi) off the coast of Aogashima, near the southern end of the Izu archipelago, Japan. Sumisu-tō is administratively part of Tokyo Metropolis.

== Geography ==
The island is a basalt and olivine pillar with sheer sides, the only visible portion of an active submarine volcanic caldera extending south of the island with a circumference of approximately 10 kilometres (6.2 mi). The above sea-level portion has a height of 134 metres (440 ft). The island is estimated to have been created by a volcanic eruption around 20,000 years ago. In the immediate vicinity are numerous exposed and awash rocks. Due to its shape and heavy seas it is difficult to disembark on the island, although at times fishermen are known to have landed there. The abundance of fish in the surrounding waters has made it attractive for both sport and commercial fishing.

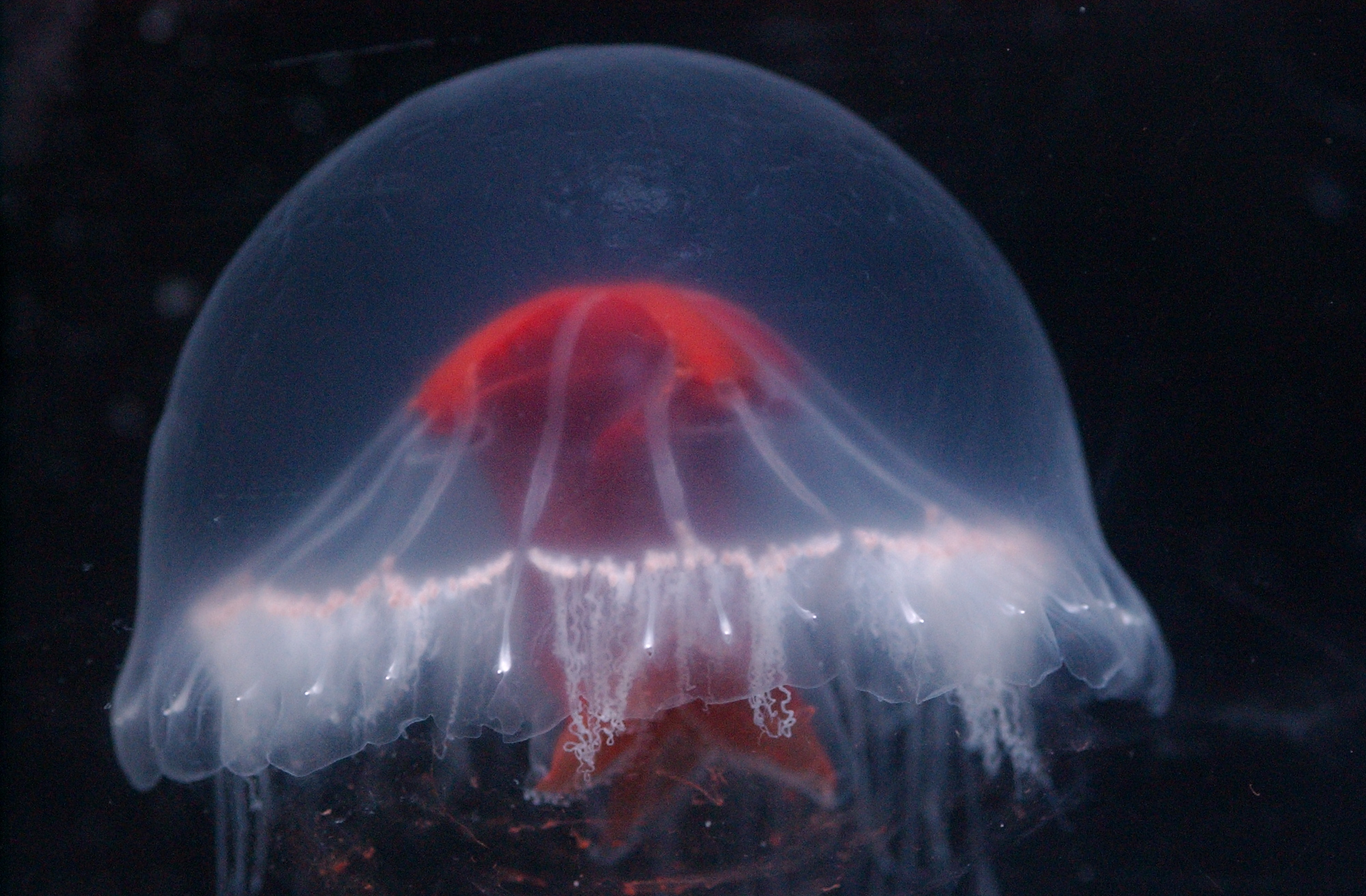
The jellyfish species Santjordia pagesi was discovered using a remotely operated underwater vehicle in the island's waters.

== History ==
The island has been known by Japanese fishermen and mariners from an early time. In 1870, a submarine eruption was recorded NNE of the island, resulting in the formation of a new islet, named Niijima (新島), with a height of 13 metres (43 ft). The islet has subsequently sunk beneath sea level due to erosion. From 1974 to 1977, a series of underwater eruptions have been recorded, discoloring water in the area. In November 1991, a fishing vessel reported that a large section of the island's northern face had collapsed, resulting in a significant change in its profile. Further changes to the island's profile were recorded after 1992 earthquakes.

== See also ==
- Izu Islands
- Desert island
- List of islands
- List of volcanoes in Japan
- List of islands in Japan
