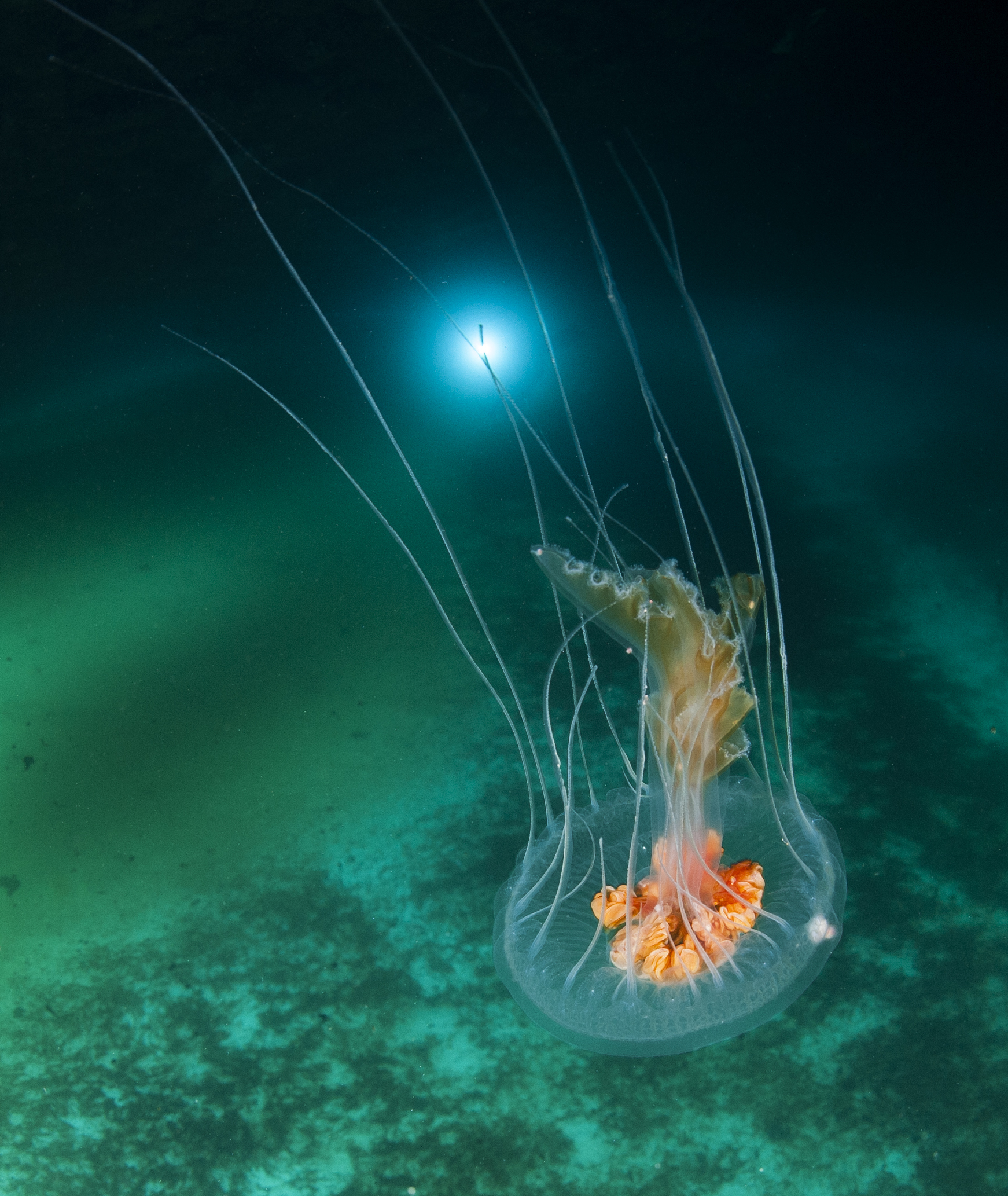
- Diplulmaris antarctica offshore from Dumont d'Urville Station, in the Géologie Archipelago.

Scientific classification
- Kingdom: Animalia
- Phylum: Cnidaria
- Class: Scyphozoa
- Order: Semaeostomeae
- Family: Ulmaridae
- Genus: Diplulmaris
- Species: D. antarctica

Binomial name
- Diplulmaris antarctica Maas, 1908

Synonyms
- Ulmaropsis drygalskii Vanhöffen, 1908

= Diplulmaris antarctica =

Species of jellyfish

Diplulmaris antarctica is a species of Antarctic jellyfish in the family Ulmaridae.

== Description ==
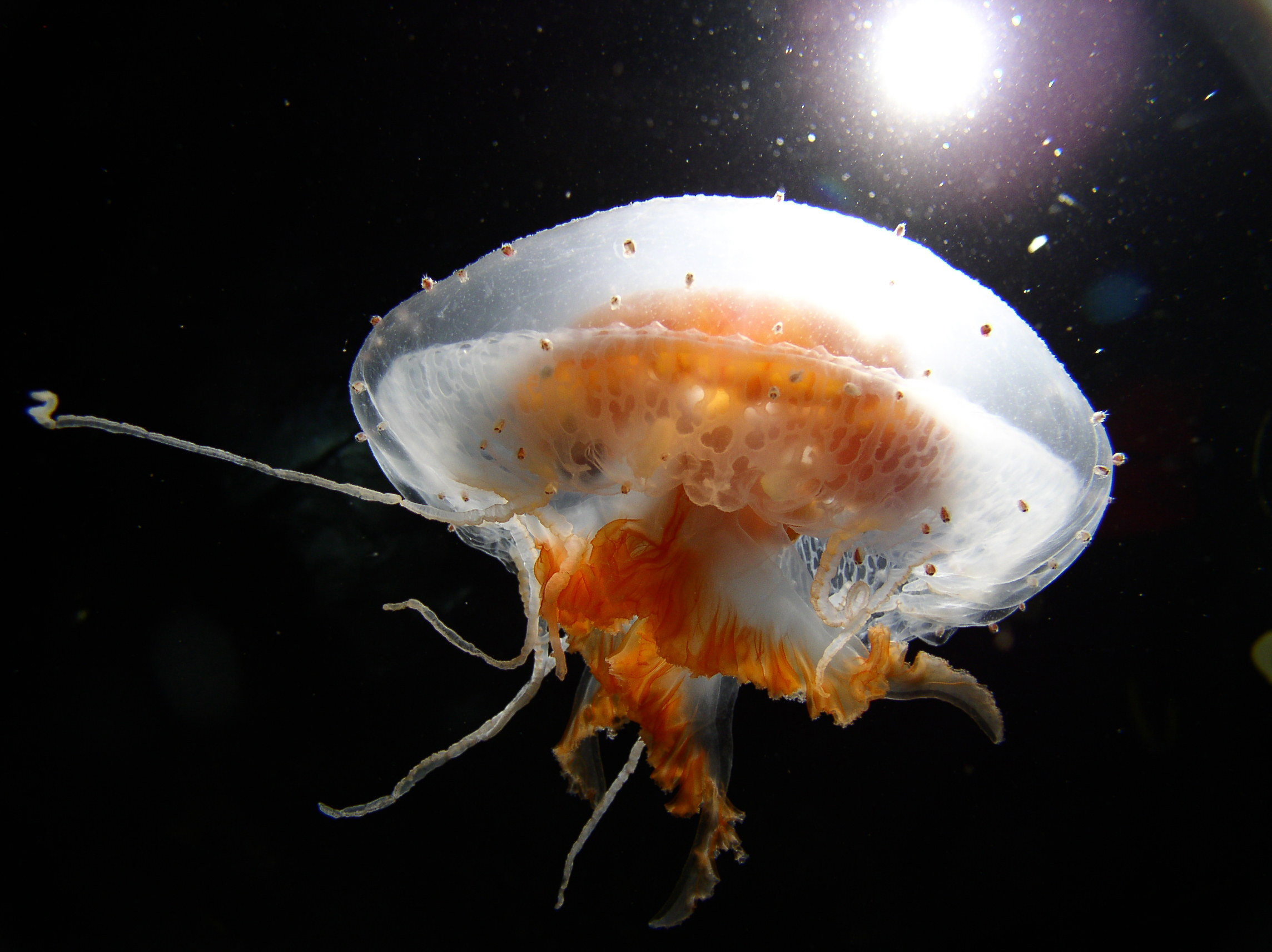
Diplulmaris antarctica with amphipods, offshore from McMurdo Station, Ross Island

This species grows up to 18 cm (7 in) in diameter. Diplulmaris antarctica has 16 - 48 laterally compressed, white tentacles and a white frontal lobe. It has reddish-orange stomach gastrodermis and frilled oral arms of the same colour.

This jellyfish is normally infested with Hyperiella dilatata. These hyperiid amphipods appear as white dots on the surface of the bell, and do not appear to eat the medusa.

== Diet ==
Diplulmaris antarctica feeds on copepods, euphausiid larvate, medusae, ctenophore, fish larvae, and molluscan pteropods such as Clione antarctica and Limacina antarctica.

== Distribution ==
This species is found in Antarctica including the Antarctic Peninsula in continental shelf waters near the surface.
