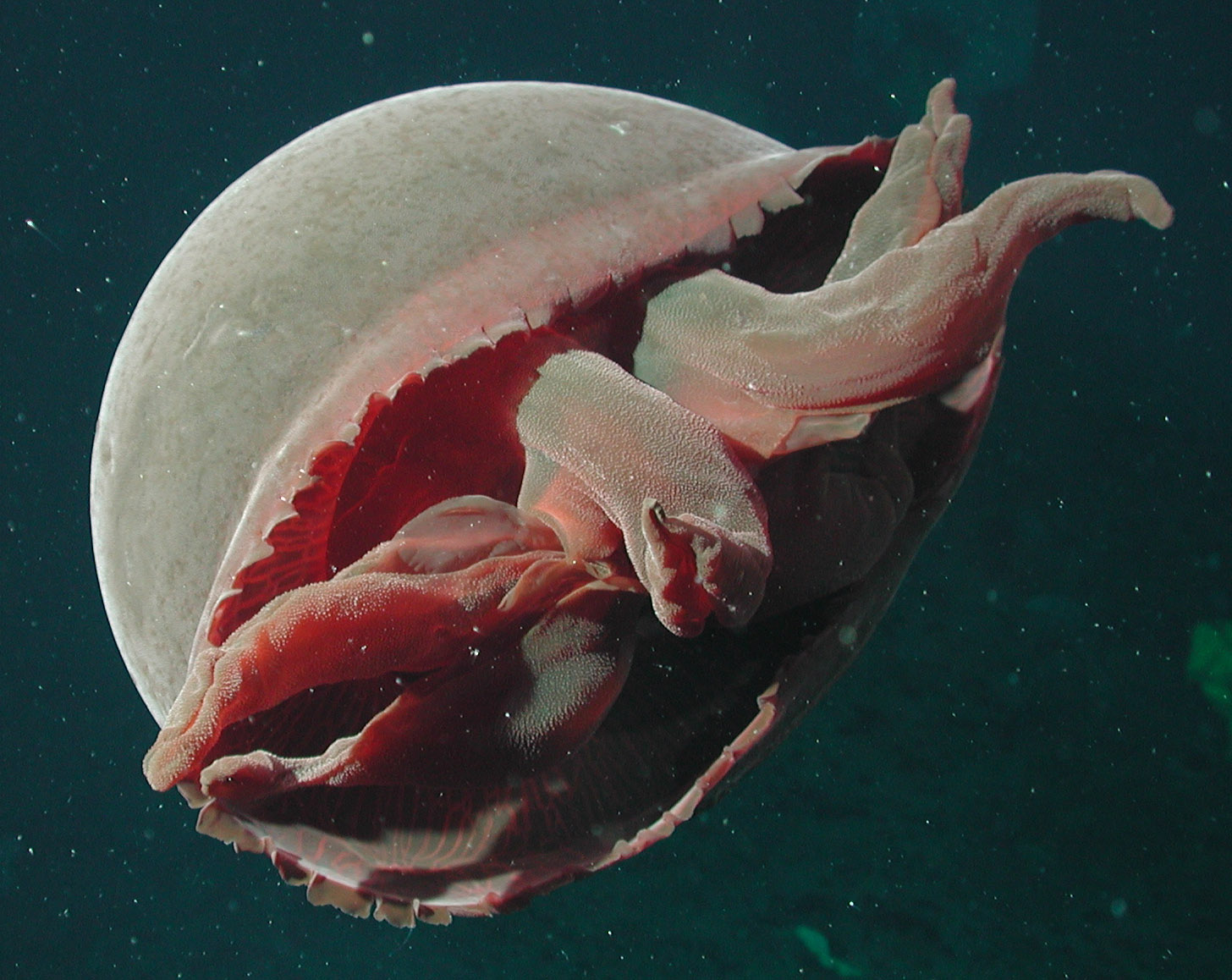

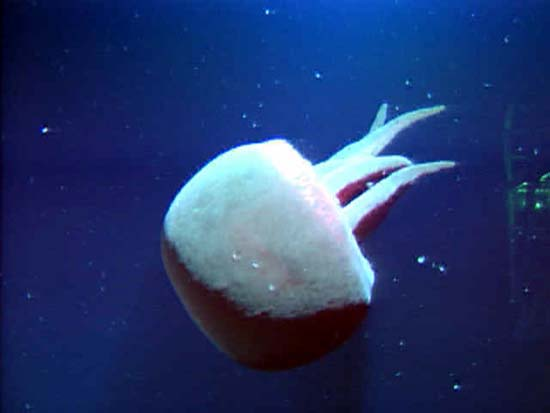

Scientific classification
- Kingdom: Animalia
- Phylum: Cnidaria
- Class: Scyphozoa
- Order: Semaeostomeae
- Family: Ulmaridae
- Subfamily: Tiburoniinae; Matsumoto et al., 2003
- Genus: Tiburonia; Matsumoto et al., 2003
- Species: T. granrojo

Binomial name
- Tiburonia granrojo Matsumoto et al., 2003

= Tiburonia =

Genus of jellyfishes

Tiburonia is a genus of jellyfish in the family Ulmaridae. It was reported in 2003, following the discovery of its only species yet identified, Tiburonia granrojo. It was discovered by a crew from MBARI led by George Matsumoto. Pieces of the medusae (bell margin and arms) were collected for morphological analysis, which eventually led to sequencing and taxonomic identification. The discovery of this organism led to not only a new species, but a new subfamily of Ulmaridae, called Tiburoniinae. Its genus was named Tiburonia after the ROV the crew were using, called Tiburon, meaning "shark" in Spanish. Its species name, granrojo, meaning "big red" in Spanish, leading to its English-language name, the big red jellyfish.

Tiburonia granrojo lives at ocean depths of 600 to 1,500 metres (2,000 to 4,900 ft) and has been found across the Pacific Ocean in the Gulf of California, Monterey Bay, Hawaii and Japan. The jellyfish is deep-red in color. It can grow up to one meter in diameter according to the California Academy of Sciences and has between 4 and 7 flesh arms in place of tentacles found in most jellyfish.

Davidson Seamount specimen, 18 May 2002
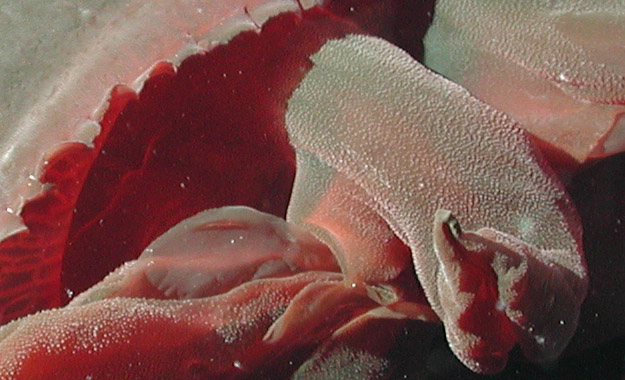
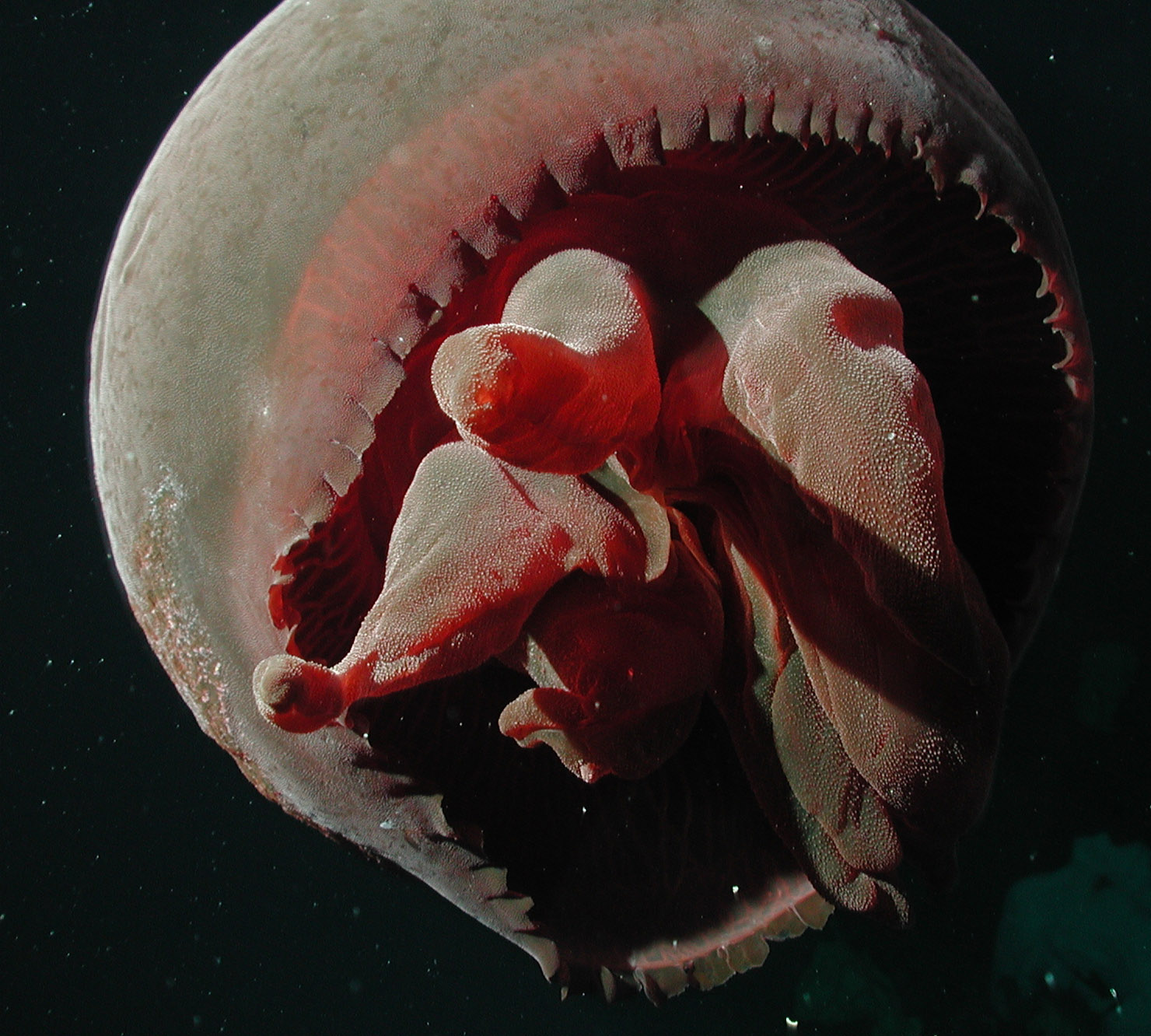
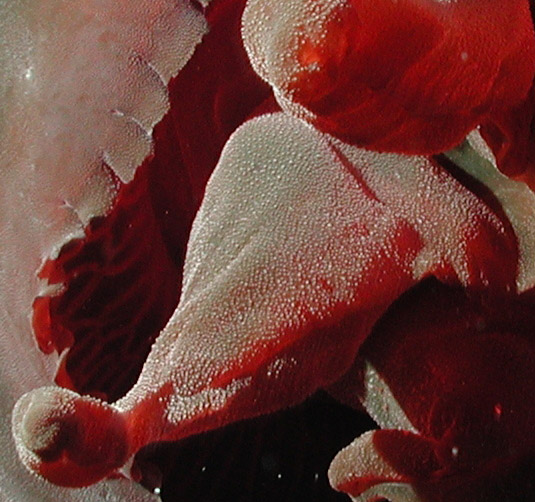

To date, only 23 members of the species have been found and only one, a small specimen under 15 centimetres (6 in), has been retrieved for further study. Several high-resolution videos of granrojo have been taken by remote controlled submarines. The discovery was announced by Dr. Matsumoto and colleagues in Marine Biology in 2003. The first specimen of the species was obtained around the Japan trench and was placed in the National Science Museum in Tokyo.
