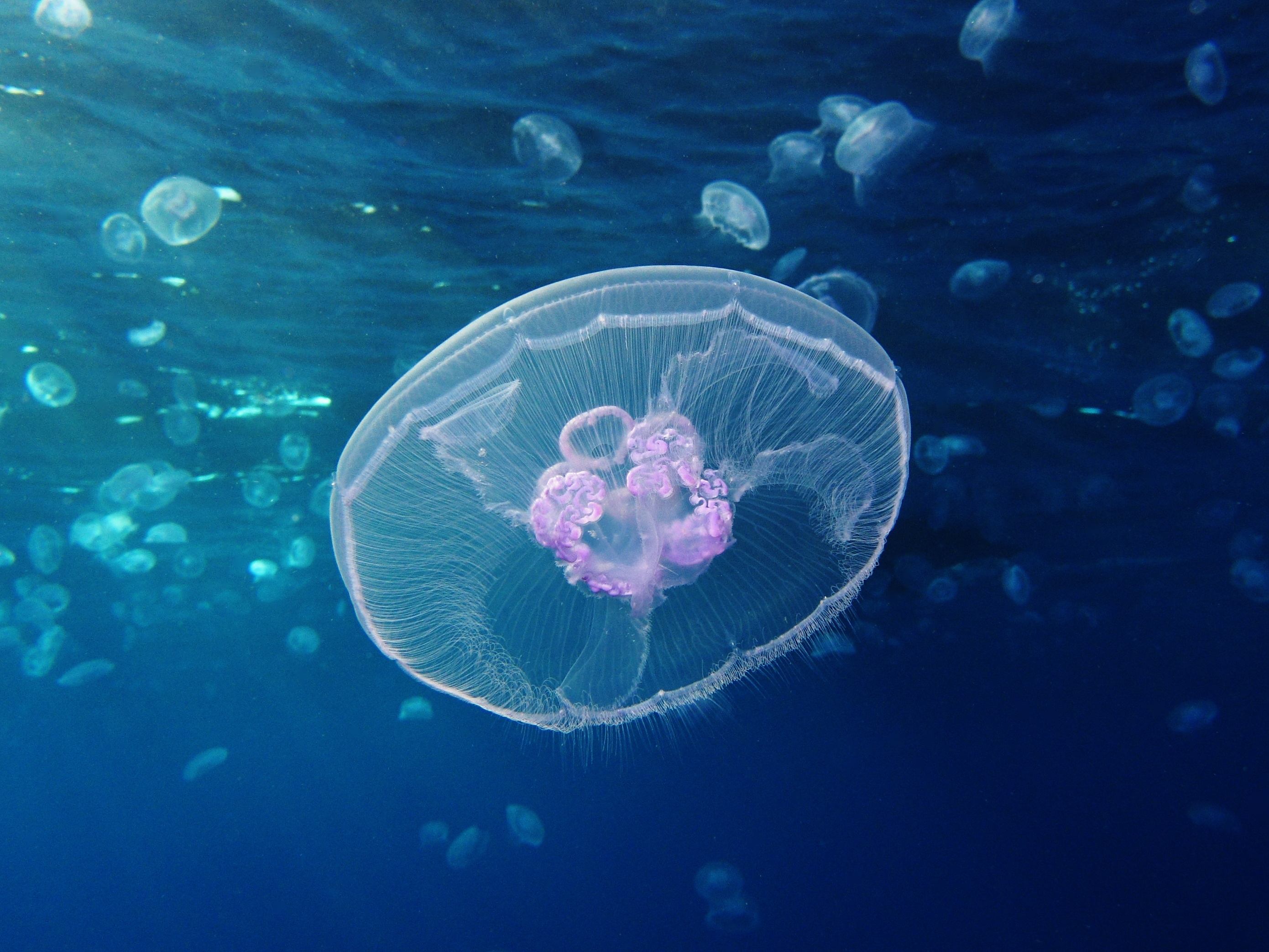
- Aurelia aurita
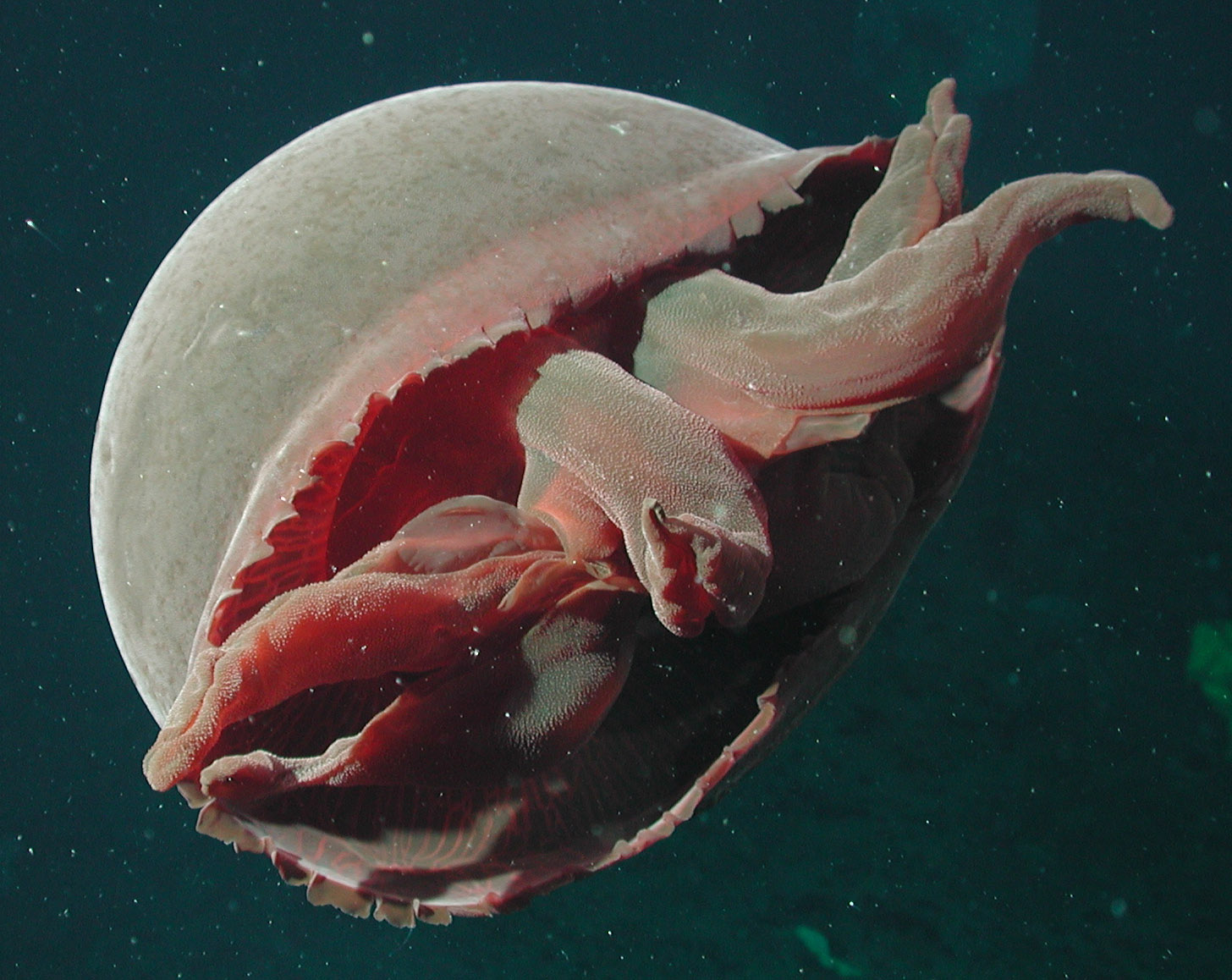
- Tiburonia granrojo

Scientific classification
- Kingdom: Animalia
- Phylum: Cnidaria
- Class: Scyphozoa
- Order: Semaeostomeae
- Family: Ulmaridae; Haeckel, 1879

Genera
- See text

= Ulmaridae =

Family of jellyfish

The Ulmaridae are a family of jellyfish, which includes the moon jellies, and other jellyfish with unique characteristics like Tiburonia granrojo.

== Genera ==
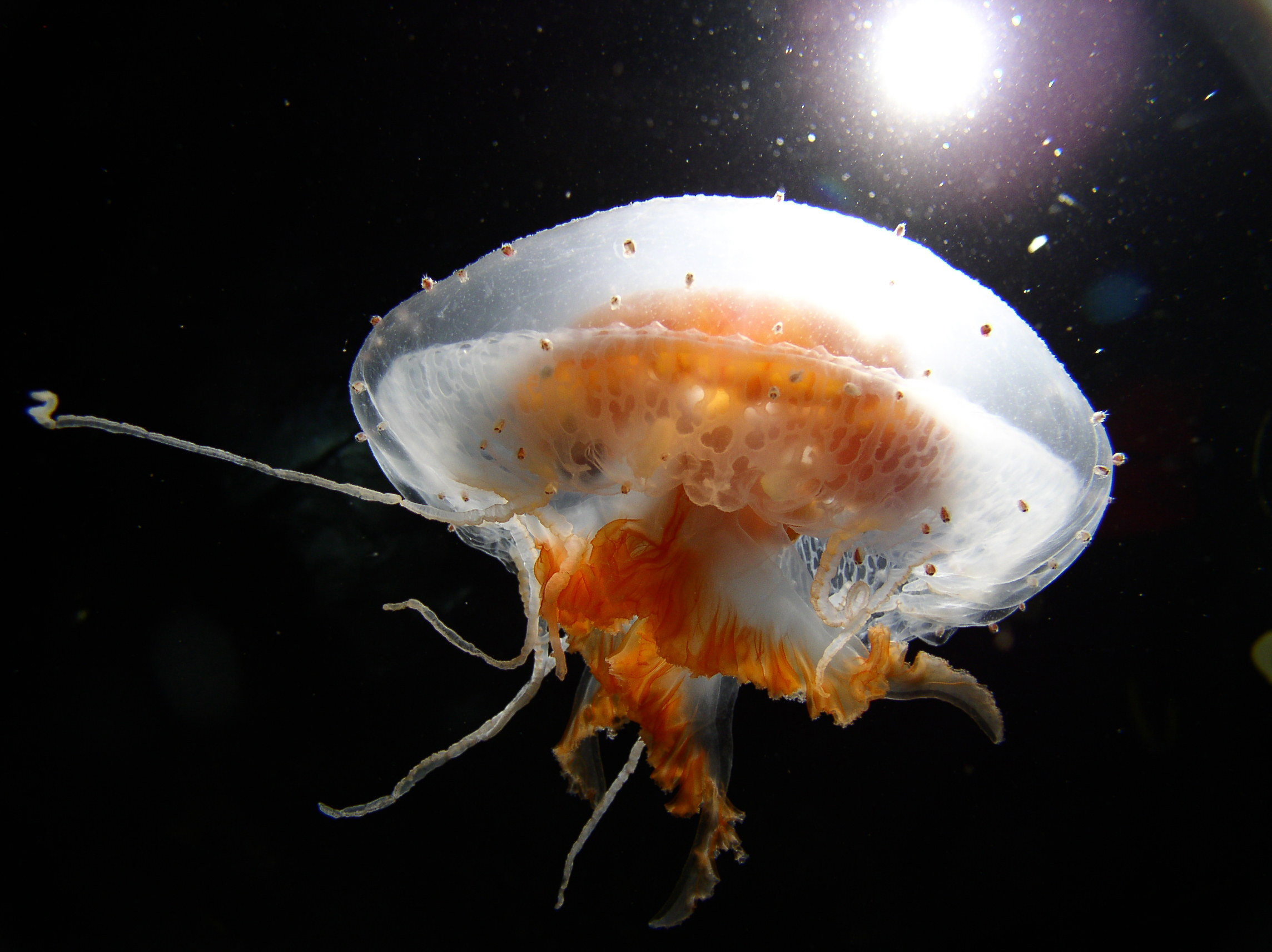
Diplulmaris antarctica from offshore of McMurdo Station, Ross Island.

Formerly, the genus Phacellophora was also included in this family, but is now placed in the family Phacellophoridae.

- Aurelia (includes the moon jelly)
- Aurosa
- Deepstaria
- Diplulmaris
- Discomedusa
- Floresca
- Parumbrosa
- Poralia
- Santjordia
- Stellamedusa
- Sthenonia
- Stygiomedusa (giant phantom jelly)
- Tiburonia
- Ulmaris
