= Deep Star 4000 =

U.S. Navy/civilian deep-submergence vehicle

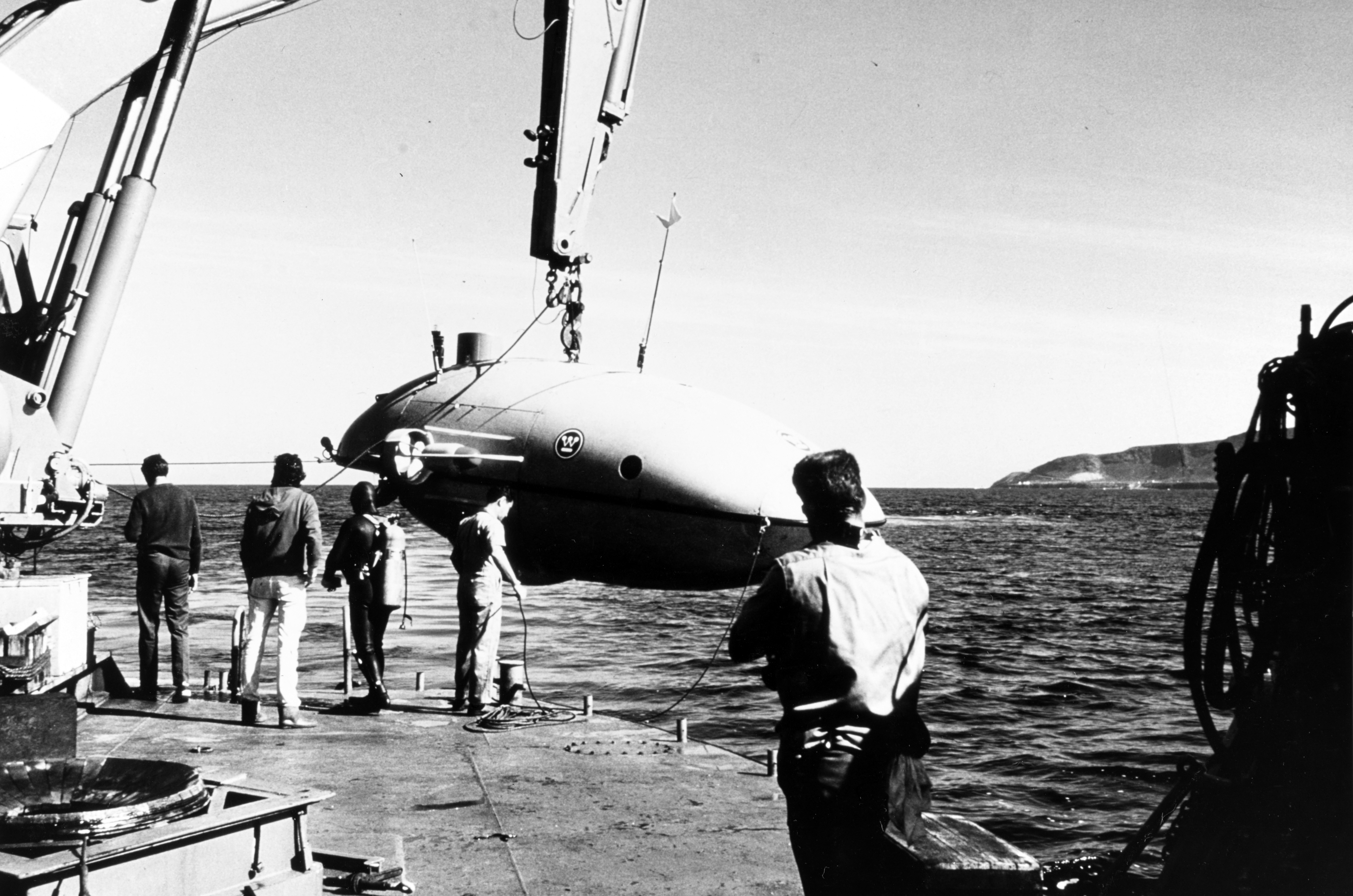
Deepstar 4000 being lowered into the water to inspect SEALAB III off San Clemente, California.

Deepstar 4000 was a U.S. Navy/civilian deep-submergence vehicle designed by Jacques Cousteau and built by Westinghouse. It was built in 1965 and retired in 1972. Some of the explorations of Deepstar 4000 were shown in the January 1971 edition of National Geographic. At the time of the article, Deepstar 4000 had already completed more than 200 dives in the Atlantic, Pacific, and Caribbean. This number of completed dives appears to be understated. In R. Frank Busby's book Manned Submersibles, it is stated on page 53 that the Deepstar 4000 "conducted some 500 dives from June 1966 through June 1968". Deepstar 4000 was designed to take a crew of up to three to a depth of 4,000 feet (1,200 m), or over 665 fathoms. Hence the name, Deepstar 4000.

== History ==
The U.S. Naval Oceanographic Office used Deepstar 4000 for 13 dives during October and November 1967. Marine geology, biology and the physical properties of the water column were studied on the 10 deep dives of this series. These dives were accomplished along the east coast of the United States and in the Caribbean. Great similarities in the bottom features at widely separated sites as well as dissimilarities in adjacent areas were particularly noteworthy.

During this operation Deepstar 4000 was evaluated as a Deep Oceanographic Survey Vehicle (DOSV). The lack of an all-weather capability and the rather limited payload hampered this study, but the overlapping fields of the viewports and the ability to operate in very close proximity to the bottom, regardless of terrain, are desirable features that should be included on any future DOSV.

Accurate measurements of in-situ sound speed, temperature, salinity, and pressure have been achieved during numerous replicating dives aboard Deepstar 4000 to depths of 1,200 metres (3,900 ft). Crewed deep submergence vehicles offer optimum methods for observing the actual ocean environment. Advantages of submersibles include: capabilities of mounting multiple equipments with short cables, visually monitoring instruments during data acquisition, and controlling proximity to the seafloor—significant improvements over suspending sensors with miles of cables from rolling, pitching surface craft.

On one Deep Star 4000 dive south of San Diego, California, the crew, Dr. Eugene C. La Fond and pilot, narrowly escaped tragedy when the ascent system and its backup failed at 3,500 feet down. The weights normally meant to detach to allow ascent would not release. To save the craft, hundreds of pounds of mercury ballast used for trim was hand pumped onto the ocean floor and the craft could rise.

== Equipment ==
Instrument packages have consisted of three precision velocimeters (two NUS TR-4's and one TR-5), two Dymec temperature sensors, one Bissett-Berman salinometer, one or two Vibrotrons, and four Fjarlie bottles with four reversing thermometers each. Accuracy is enhanced by meticulous calibrations before and after dive series, delicate handling of all equipment, intercomparison of several instruments, consistently careful measurements, and correct assessments of thermal lags and pressure effects. Results are compared with existing equations for sound speed versus temperature, salinity, and pressure. The United States has made a torpedo-shaped probe called the Deep Flight.

== Unknown fish observation ==
In 1967, a crew member of the Deepstar 4000, Joe Thompson, claimed that he had observed an unknown fish of extreme size while onboard the vessel. According to his account, the giant fish was observed in 1966 by himself and briefly by one other crew member while off the coast of San Diego. Thompson claimed to have observed the fish while placing equipment on the sea floor and glancing outside his window. His description was that it was bigger than the submarine itself, with fish scales the size of coffee cups, and that its eyes were larger than dinner plates. According to Thompson, it quickly swam away before any crew member could get photographic evidence of it. Following this account Thompson would continue to spread this story to others, such as cryptozoologist Gardner Soule.

== Undersea desert ==
On Dec. 4, 1966, Eugene LaFond (accompanied by fellow Deepstar crewmen Dale Good and Bob Bradley) reported finding a surprisingly lifeless area of the San Pedro Basin. A region of the sea floor three thousand feet below and ten miles north of Avalon, Santa Catalina Island. Dr. LaFond was quoted as saying: "Usually, we see brittle stars or sable fish on the bottom. This time, however, the basin was devoid of life. All we saw were dead squid...and other organisms."

LaFond had been working for the Navy Electronics Laboratory (NEL) since 1946 and contributed to the development of many submersibles including Deep Star 4000.
