= Caiquetio =

Caiquetio may refer to:

- Caiquetio people, an ethnic group of Venezuela
- Caiquetio language, the extinct language formerly spoken by them
- SV Caiquetio, a football club of Aruba
