= Caquetío language =

Extinct Arawakan language of Venezuela and the ABC islands

Caquetío
- Native to: Venezuela; Aruba; Bonaire; Curaçao
- Region: Falcón, ABC Islands
- Ethnicity: Caquetío
- Extinct: 1800
- Language family: Arawakan: Northern; Ta-Arawakan; Caquetío

Language codes
- ISO 639-3: None (mis)
- Glottolog: arub1238
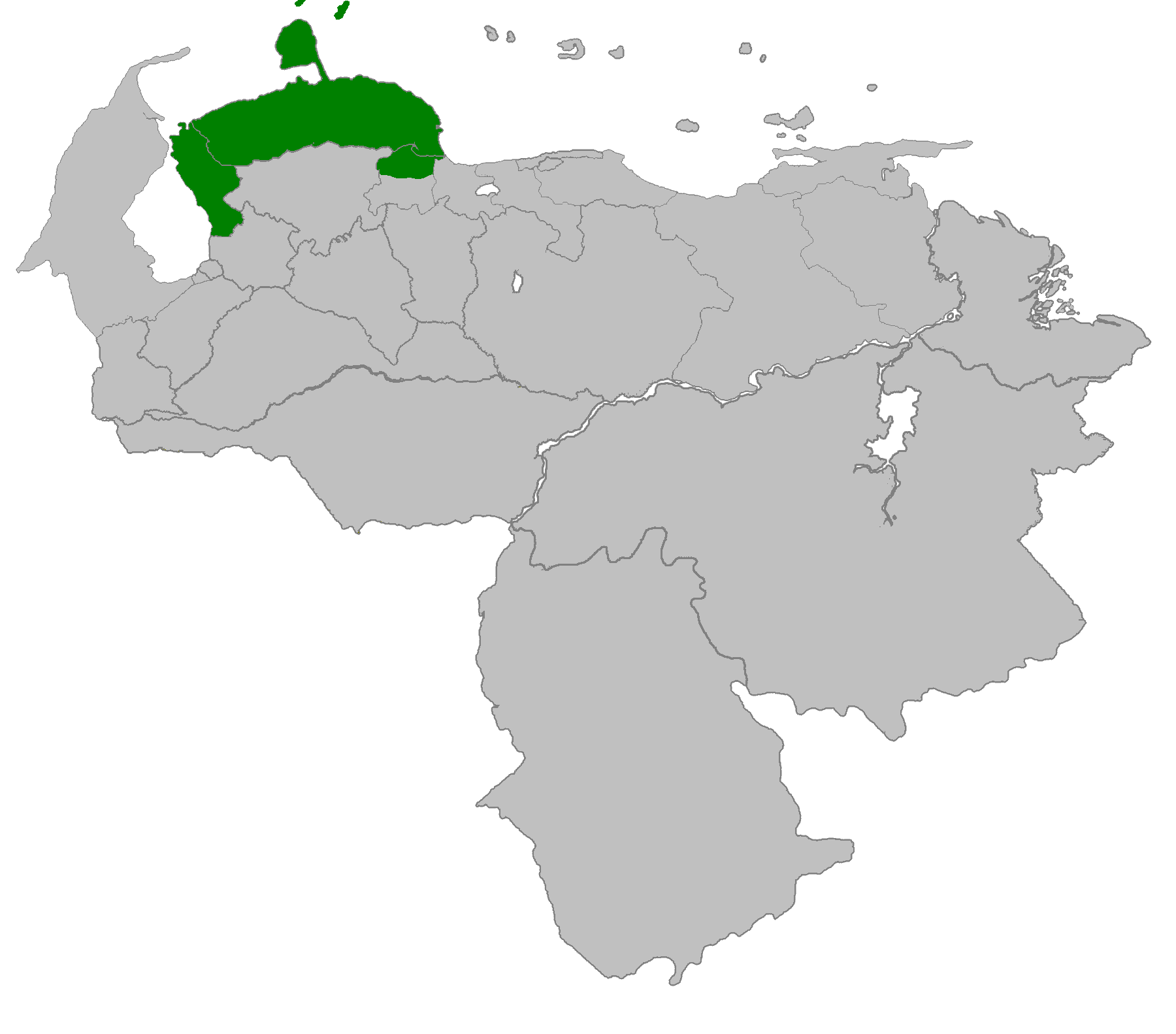
- Map of the Caquetío nation

Caquetío, also called Caquetío Arawak, is an extinct Arawakan language. The language was spoken along the shores of Lake Maracaibo, in the coastal areas of the Venezuelan state of Falcón, and on the Dutch islands of Aruba, Bonaire and Curaçao. Only some short wordlists still exist of Caquetío.

== Name ==
An important discovery was the term kakïtho used by the Lokono to refer to "people" or "living beings", which encompasses a broader meaning than the term loko. The Lokono term "kakïtho" is related to the Caquetío word kaketío, and both are also related to Pre-Andes Maipuran terms for "person". The Piro (Yine language) and Apurinã respectively use the terms kaxiti and kakiti to designate "people". Given the widespread use of this term, it is believed to have originated from Proto-Maipuran. Some suggest that the name "Caquetío" may have originated from the Caqueta River. The misspelling of "Caquetío" as "Caiquetio" stems from an early Spanish document.

== History ==
Around 500 BCE, the Caquetío language group separated from the Middle to Upper Orinoco areas, migrated alongside the Apure River, and headed northwest to Venezuela. Eventually, they reached the islands of Aruba, Bonaire, and Curaçao. Simultaneously, other groups like the Carib, Lokono, and Taíno evolved due to migrations from the Orinoco to the Caribbean region. The Caquetio switched to Papiamento in 1800.

== Geographical distribution ==
Caquetío was spoken not only on the ABC islands but also along the Venezuelan coast, particularly in the Yaracuy, Portuguesa, and Apure river regions, today the states of Falcón and Lara. The language declined as the indigenous Amerindian population decreased during Spanish occupation.

== Vocabulary ==
With the arrival of Europeans, the dominant Caquetío language emerged. Many place names (toponymy) and personal names (anthroponymy) persist along the Falcón coast, and some have survived on Aruba, Curaçao, and Bonaire. Although Caquetío's influence on Papiamento is limited, some originally Caquetío words are present in Papiamento.

=== Toponymy ===
Indigenous names are prevalent in specific regions of Aruba, such as Sasiriwichi at the northwestern tip, near the California lighthouse. Additionally, the hilly areas in eastern Aruba, from Cashiunti, Huliba, Kiwarcu to Coashiati or Jamanota, and the north coast between Andicuri and Oranjestad, abound in Caquetío toponyms.

=== Influence ===
Notably, many Caquetío words in Papiamento pertain to local flora and fauna, unfamiliar to European settlers and the African slaves who arrived in the area in early 16th century.

=== Sample words ===
In the first table a few words and expressions of the Caquetio language, which could still be recalled by a few elders (with some difficulty as the language had already been dead at the time) and which were recorded by Dutch pastor A.J. van Koolwijk in Aruba in 1880.

| Caquetío | Dutch | English |
|---|---|---|
| Hida? Hida meeuw? | Hoe gaat het? | How's it going? |
| Auw (as an answer to "Hida (meeuw)?") | Goed | Good |
| Hafe dobo danwajete! | Ga zitten!, Ga zitten op de stoel! | Sit down (on the chair)! |
| Cautje baulete! | Geef mij te eten! | Give me food! |
| Dat je! | Ga weg! | Go away! |
| Mimanta | Ik ben geschrokken | I got spooked |
| Carebe | Een eetlepel | Spoon |
| Totoemba, Waidanga | Een kalebas om uit te drinken | Drinking bowl or bottle made from a calabash |
| Dauchikki, Dousebou | Een zak | Bag, Pocket |
| Bouseranja | Huismeubelen | Furniture |
| Caula | Een ding | Thing |
| Adamoedoe | Regen | Rain |
| Baroe hantoe wou | (Gebed na het eten) | (Prayer at the end of a meal) |
| Kajappa | Arbeiders om te planten | Workers for planting |
| Marakka | Castagnet | Castanet |
| Aboussoe | Een maïskoek | Maze cookie |
| Sako den comanari maria di watapoena fafa na douée sodji na ditiéri | (Bezwering na het vangen van een leguaan) | (Prayer after having caught an iguana) |
| Pekinini | Een kind | Child |
| Dori | Roodbilkikker | Colombian four-eyed frog |
| Waltakka | Gestreepte Anolis | Curaçao striped anole |

In the summer of 1882, Alphonse Pinart collected some vocabulary of the native language of Aruba. His vocabulary is presented below.

| gloss | Caquetio |
|---|---|
| rain | adamudu |
| to ask for something to eat | bāru xantu uōu |
| sack, pouch | danshikki, danshēbu |
| be gone! | datiē! |
| devil, wicked spirit | kāfa |
| thing, object | kanla (kaula?) |
| give me to eat! | kantie baulēte! |
| spoon | karebe |
| sit down! | ꭓāba dōboꭓedan guayete! |
| good morning! | ꭓida mēo! |
| phantom, hobgoblin | ꭓomoi |
| how do you do? | ꭓute kontābo? |
| water-gourd | totumba, waidānga |
| fruit of Libidibia coriaria | dividivi |
| Spondias mombin | jobo |
| Cereus repandus | kadushi |
| Agaricus | kipopo |
| Mimosa unguiscata | lokiloki |
| Abrus precatorius | makura |
| Cytisus catjan | nandu |
| Malpighia glabra | shimaruko |
| Cratera gynandra | surun |
| Ragara octandra | takamahak |
| Robinia pulcherrima | tuturutu |
| Sapindus coriaria | watapana |
| Theretia neriflora | yoroyoro |
| Diodon hystrix | ginga |
| Characinus cyprinioides | karmā-u |
| Chaetodon fromitus | kurkur |
| Epinephelus fasciatus | puruntsi |
| Cymindes illigeri | kinikini |
| Fulica sp.? | krabete |
| Orpheus americanus | shushubi |
| Cathartes curasoica | warawara |
| Rana sp. (?) | dori |
| Sitophilus granarius | guruguru |
| Formica cephalota | hanahana |
| Cassiopea frondosa | kimakima |
| Termes fatalis | kumexen |
| Conops sanguisuga | lembelembe |
| Ichneumon niger | mamondenga |
| Mytilus edulis | paluli |
| lizard | waltaka |

== Sample phrases ==
Pinart also collected the following exorcist's or conjurer's "formulas":

| Usage | Caquetio |
|---|---|
| maledictory formula | ꭓerebēte den kāfa magolotchi |
| for frightening children | tue daye datiēʹ gidioʹ dimi guriō yatabo |
| to remove cactus-spines from the body | una areya rafayete dudrea ebanero abonō, caburo copudabo daburi. |
| to remove cactus-spines from the body | yuni roba rapebo tchaba na aripebo, duda banabo pebo, home daba burvo, damei bo bakuna, daodao fuda dada. |
| to remove fishbones or other obstructions from the throat | vidiē pahidiē, maranakō tubara tchira deburro, hadāra karara |
| for hunting the iguana | Sako den komanari manadi watapuna fāfa na douēre sadii na ditieri. |

== Sources ==
- Arcaya, P.M. (1951). Historia del Estado Falcón, Republica de Venezuela I (in Spanish). Caracas: Tipografia La Nación. Archived from the original on 2023-10-17.
- Buurt, Gerard Van; Joubert, Sidney M. (1997). Stemmen uit het verleden: Indiaanse woorden in het Papiamentu [Voices from the past: Indian words in Papiamentu]. Van Buurt. ISBN 9789990401455.
- Gatschet, Albert S. (October 1885). "The Aruba Language and the Papiamento Jargon" . 22 (120). American Philosophical Society: 299–305. JSTOR 982990.
- Haviser, J.B. (1987). "Amerindian Cultural Geography on Curaçao". Natuurwetenschappelijke Studiekring voor Suriname en de Nederlandse Antillen. 120.
- Haviser, J.B. (1991). The first Bonaireans. Archaeological-Anthropological Institute of the Netherlands Antilles.
- Kinney, L. (1970). "Origin and Development of Papiamento". Eric. Archived from the original on 2023-05-16. "Paper prepared for the Area linguistics Seminar, Ohio State University, Columbus, july 1970"
- Noble, K.G. (1965). "Proto-Arawakan and Its Descendants". International Journal of American Linguistics. 31 (3).
- Oliver, J.R. (1989). The Archaeological, Linguistic and Ethnohistorical Evidence for the Expansion of Arawakan into Northwestern Venezuela and Northeastern Colombia (Thesis). University of Illinois at Urbana Champaign (UIUC). Archived from the original on 2023-05-03 – via UCL Discovery.
- Oliver, J.R. (1990). "Reflexiones sobre el Posible Origen del Wayú (Guajiro)". La Guajira: De la Memoria al Porvenir. Una Vision Antropológica (in Spanish) (G. Ardila Calderón ed.). Bogotá, Colombia: Centro Editorial Fondo FEN Colombia, Universidad Nacional de Colombia. pp. 81–135. ISBN 9789581700714.
- Rouse, I. (1986). Migrations in Prehistory. Inferring Population Movement from Cultural Remains. New Haven: Yale University. ISBN 9780300036121.
- Rouse, I. (1992). The Taínos, Rise and Decline of the People Who Greeted Columbus. New Haven: Yale University Press.
- Taylor, D.R. (1977). Languages of the West Indies. Baltimore-London: Johns Hopkins University Press. ISBN 9780801817298.
- Versteeg, A.; Ruiz, A.C. (1995). Reconstructing Brasil Wood Island: the archaeology and landscape of Indian Aruba. Aruba: Publications of the Archaeological Museum, no. 6.
