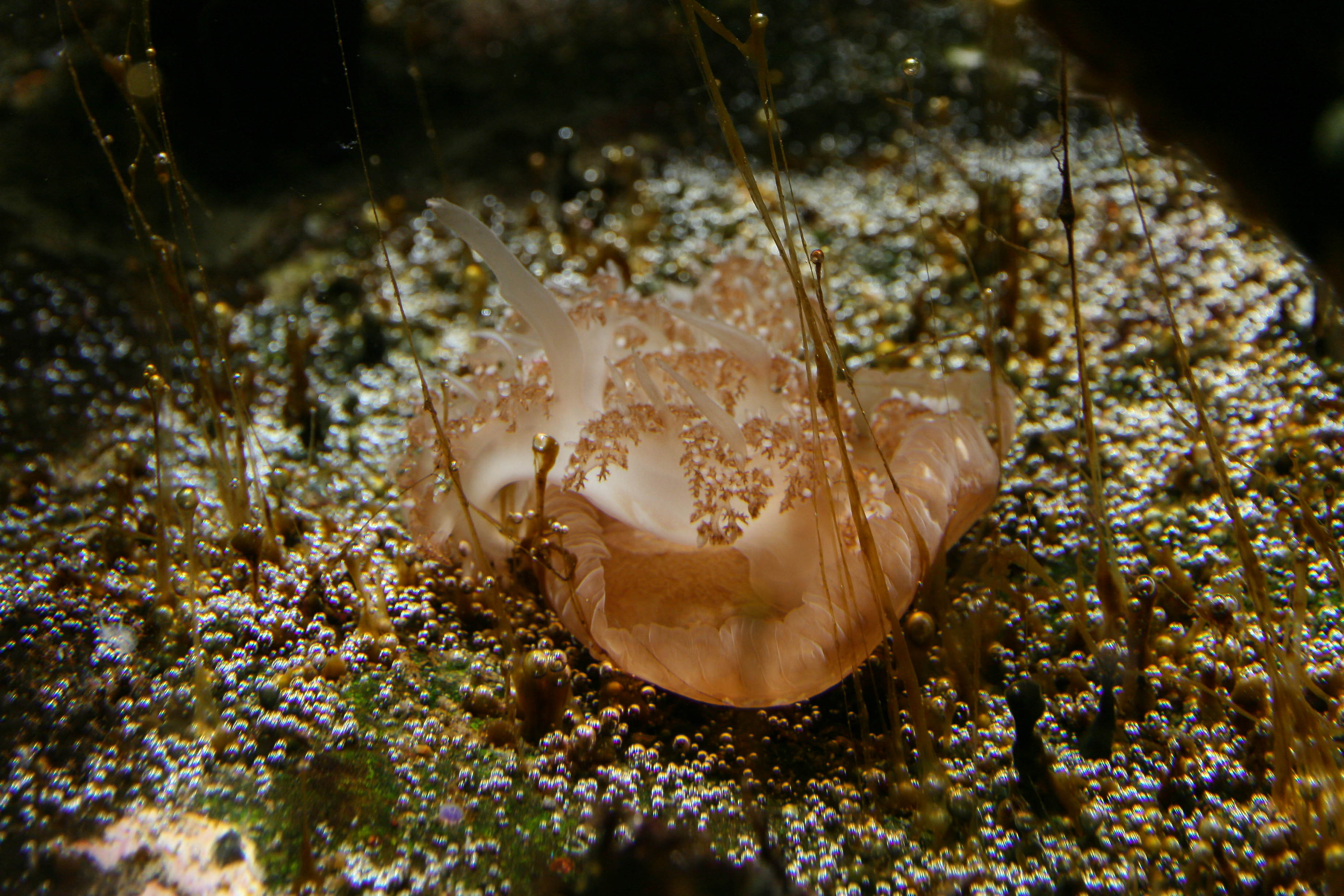
- Upside-down jellyfish

Scientific classification
- Kingdom: Animalia
- Phylum: Cnidaria
- Class: Scyphozoa
- Order: Rhizostomeae
- Family: Cassiopeidae
- Genus: Cassiopea
- Species: C. xamachana

Binomial name
- Cassiopea xamachana Bigelow, 1892

Synonyms
- Cassiopea vanderhorsti Stiasny, 1922

= Cassiopea xamachana =

Species of jellyfish

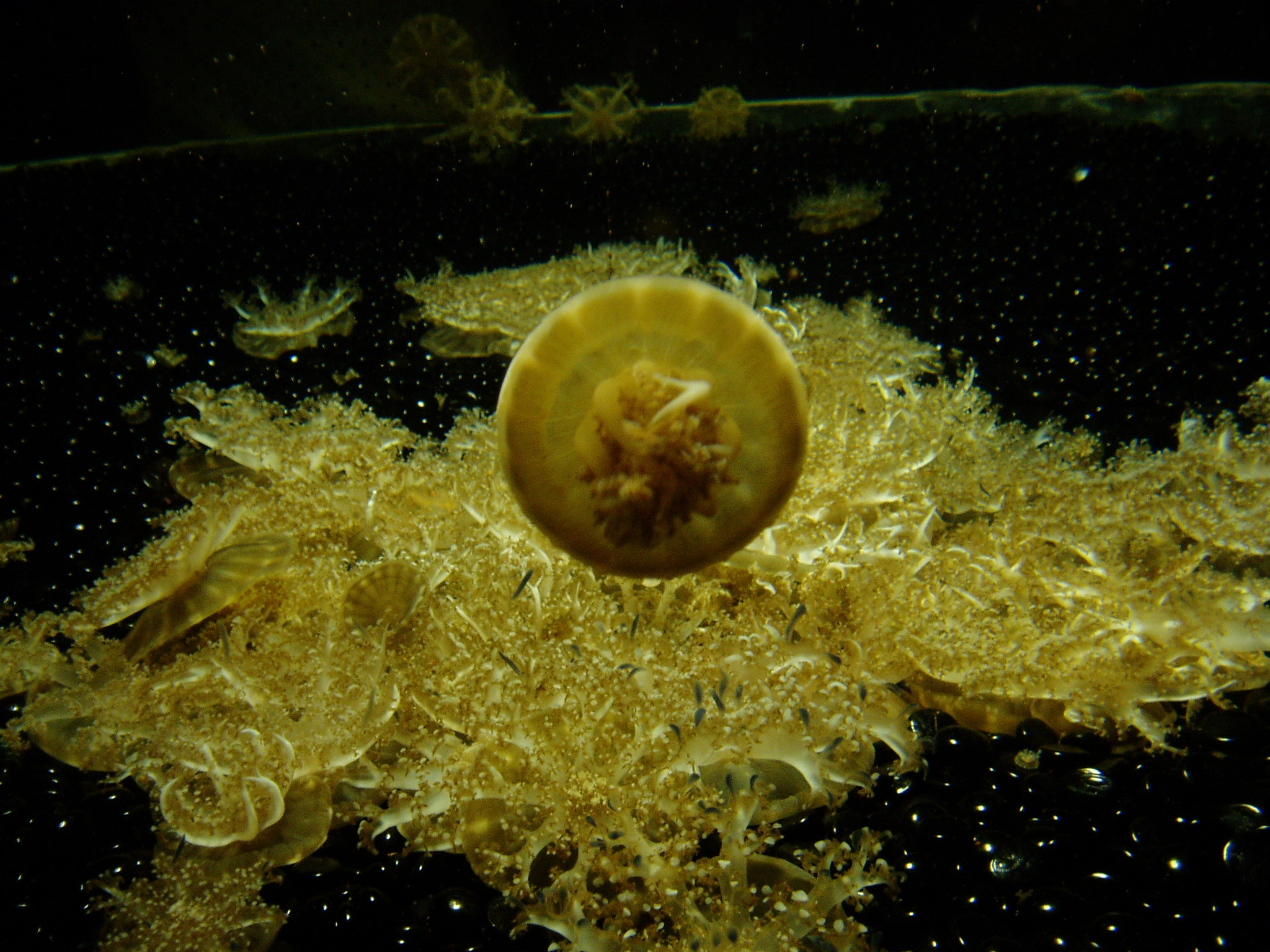
Group of upside-down jellyfish

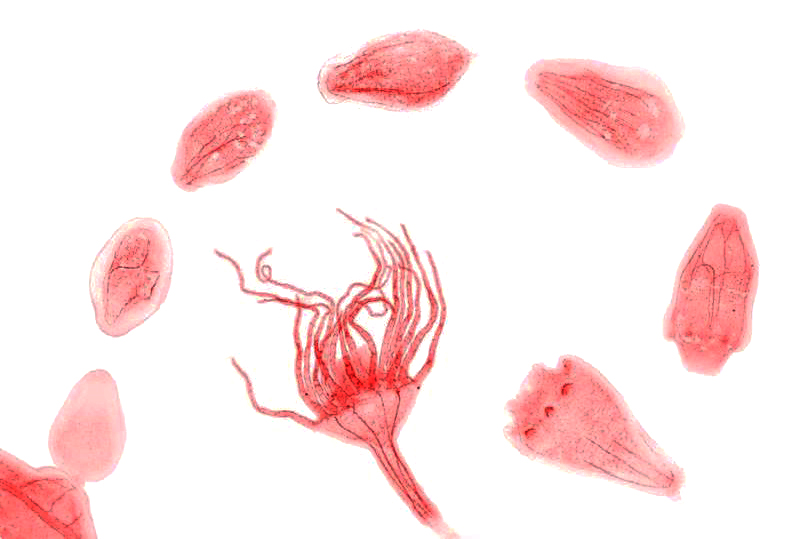
A series of confocal images, showing the musculature development of Cassopeia xamachana from planuloid bud to polyp

Cassiopea xamachana, commonly known as the upside-down jellyfish, is a species of jellyfish in the family Cassiopeidae. It is found in warm parts of the western Atlantic Ocean, the Caribbean Sea, and the Gulf of Mexico. It was first described by the American marine biologist Henry Bryant Bigelow in 1892.

== Description ==
The medusa phase of Cassiopea xamachana can grow to a diameter of about 25 cm (10 in). Compared to most species of jellyfish it is upside-down, that is to say the bell, which is saucer-shaped, is underneath and acts like a suction cup to stabilise the jellyfish on the seabed. The four pairs of much-branched tentacles are on the upperside. Instead of a central mouth, there are numerous oral openings in the tentacles which connect via channels to the stomach. The mesogloea, the jelly-like tissue, contains symbiotic zooxanthellae, single-celled protists, which are photosynthetic and give the jellyfish its variable color, often bluish-grey or bluish-green.

== Distribution and habitat ==
Cassiopea xamachana is found in warm parts of the western Atlantic Ocean, the Caribbean Sea and the Gulf of Mexico. It is normally found in large aggregations on the muddy seabed of inshore bays and shallow lagoons. If disturbed the jellyfish may pulsate their bells and rise in the water, soon flopping back onto the seabed.

== Biology ==
Cassiopea xamachana obtains part of its nutritional needs from the endosymbiotic zooxanthellae it harbors in its tissues; these use energy from the sunlight to produce carbohydrates by photosynthesis. For its further needs, as well as being able to absorb nutrients dissolved in the water, it can also catch small prey using the cnidocytes with which its tentacles are armed. Having paralysed the prey, it digests them on the oral surfaces and the resulting fragments are ingested through the oral openings. This species has become an important model system to study the molecular basis of cnidarian-algal symbiosis.

The life cycle of Cassiopea xamachana alternates between a polyp phase and the medusa phase. Gametes are released by the medusae into the water and the fertilized eggs hatch into planula larvae, which attach to the sea bed or some other suitable substrate. Decomposing red mangrove (Rhizophora mangle) give off a substance which attracts the larvae to settle. Having settled, the larvae undergo metamorphosis into the hydroid stage of the lifecycle, forming tiny sessile polyps called scyphistomae. Under favorable conditions these bud and form further scyphistomae. In due course, when they have acquired zooxanthellae and the temperature exceeds 20 °C (68 °F), these strobilate (split) and new medusae are formed. In Florida, the medusae are found all the year round but the scyphistomae are only present in late summer and fall. This is the reverse of the usual situation of rhizostome jellyfish, in more temperate locations, where the scyphistomae are temperature-tolerant and the medusae are cold-sensitive.

The jellyfish surround themselves with a layer of mucus containing cassiosomes, independent bodies consisting of a layer of stinging cells surrounding a piece of jelly as described in a 2020 study featuring notable scientists such as Jennie Janssen. Between sixty and a hundred cilia enable the cassiophore to swim independently of the jellyfish's body. The cassiophores allow the jellyfish to kill or stun its prey at a distance, and are responsible for the stinging sensation experienced by swimmers, divers and aquarists who get too close to the jellyfish.

== Etymology ==
In Greek mythology, Cassiopeia was the mother of Andromeda. Cassiopeia was punished by Poseidon, ruling god of the sea, for being a bad mother. The specific epithet, xamachana, was chosen by Bigelow to honor the indigenous name of the island of Jamaica, the type location of the species. Bigelow collected the specimen in a lagoon near Kingston Harbor, Jamaica.
