= Goldenscale anole =

There are two species of lizard named goldenscale anole:

- Anolis chrysolepis, found in Guyana, Suriname, French Guiana, and Brazil
- Anolis planiceps, found in Venezuela, Guyana, Brazil, and Trinidad
