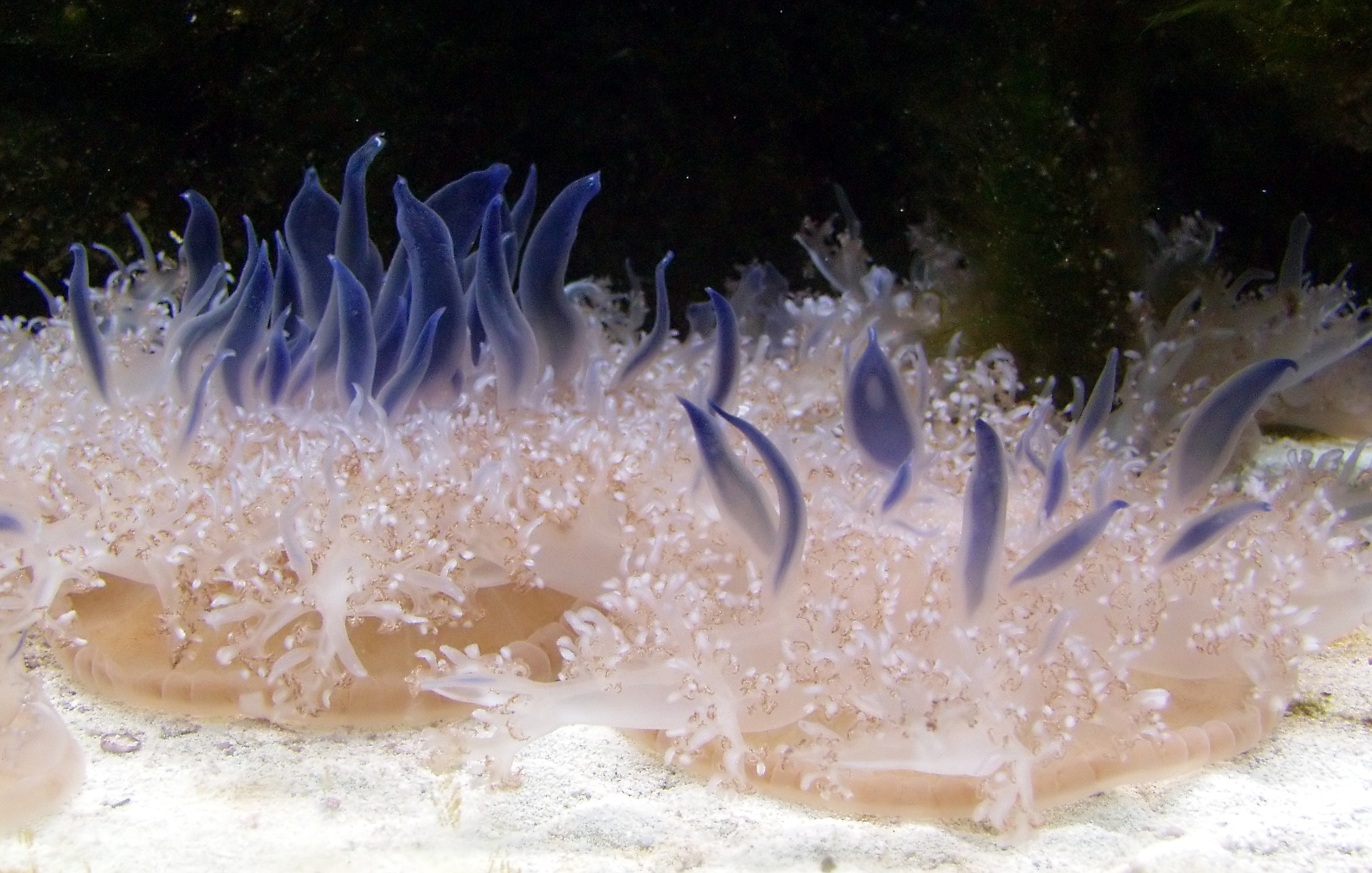
- Specimen at the Cologne Zoo

Scientific classification
- Kingdom: Animalia
- Phylum: Cnidaria
- Class: Scyphozoa
- Order: Rhizostomeae
- Family: Cassiopeidae
- Genus: Cassiopea
- Species: C. andromeda

Binomial name
- Cassiopea andromeda Forskål, 1775

Synonyms
- Cassiopea andromeda var. malayensis Maas, 1903; Cassiopea depressa subsp. picta Vanhöffen, 1888; Cassiopea picta Vanhöffen, 1888; Cassiopea polypoides Keller, 1883; Medusa andromeda Forskål, 1775

= Cassiopea andromeda =

Species of jellyfish

Cassiopea andromeda is one of many cnidarian species called the upside-down jellyfish. It usually lives in intertidal sand or mudflats, shallow lagoons, and around mangroves. This jellyfish, often mistaken for a sea anemone, usually keeps its mouth facing upward. Its yellow-brown bell, which has white or pale streaks and spots, pulsates to run water through its arms for respiration and to gather food.

== Diet and nutrition ==
Cassiopea andromeda is carnivorous and eats small animals from the sea or just pieces of them after it paralyzes its prey with its mucus and nematocysts when they are released. This jellyfish also lives in a symbiotic relationship with photosynthetic dinoflagellate algae, zooxanthellae, and with shrimp. Zooxanthellae live in the tissues of the ventral surface of the jellyfish and are responsible for its color. As the zooxanthellae obtain food for the Cassiopea andromeda, in response, it gets the sunlight that is necessary for the algae. The shrimp lives in the jellyfish's tentacles and protects it by removing parasites. In exchange, Cassiopea andromeda offers protection to the shrimp. This symbiotic relationship is called mutualism, where both species benefit from their interactions.

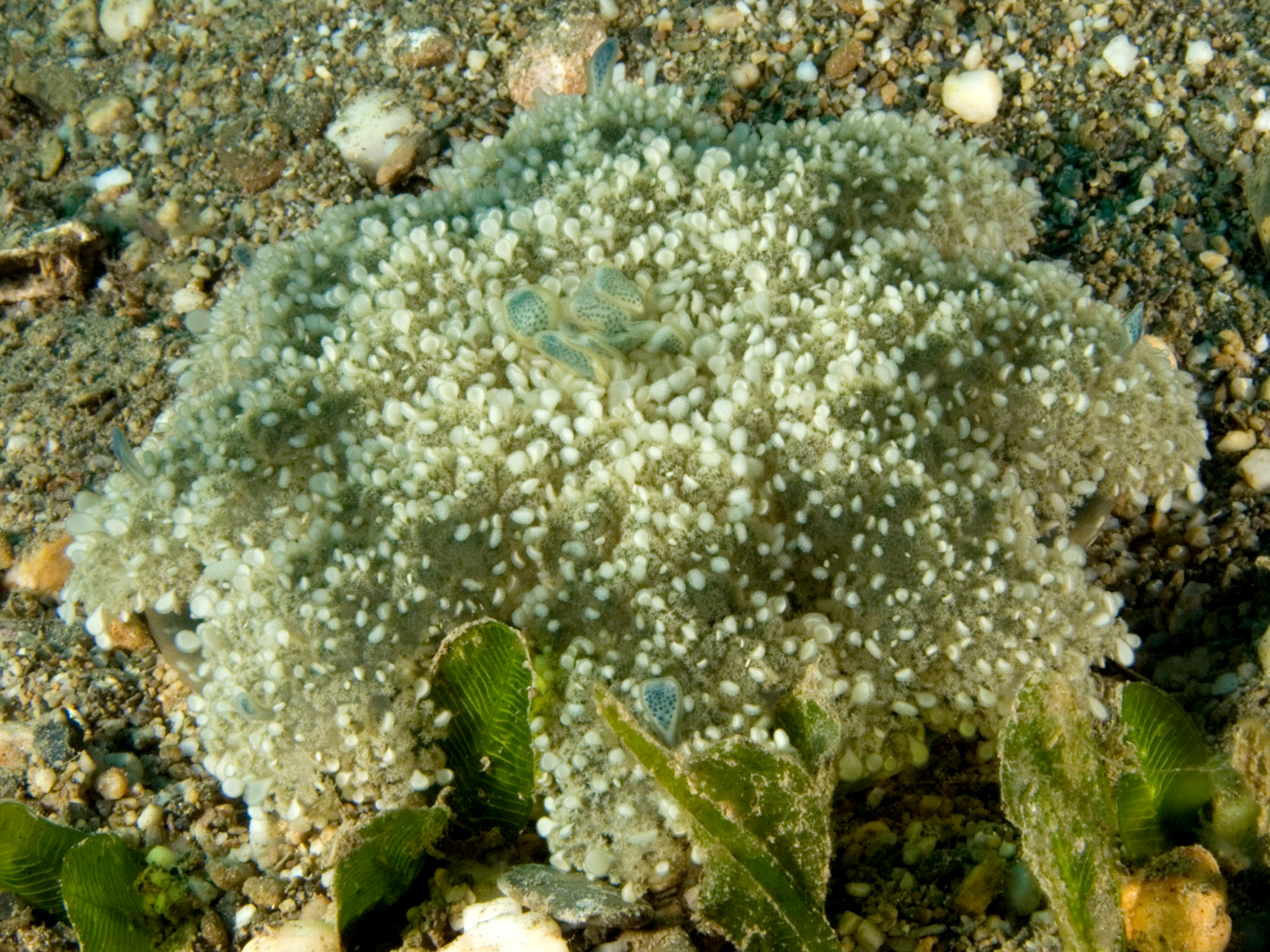
Symbiotic relationship between C. andromeda and algae

== Reproduction ==
As a cnidarian, this jellyfish employs both asexual and sexual reproduction. It reproduces by budding when it is in a polyp form. When it is in a medusa form, it reproduces sexually. The medusa female produces the eggs and keeps them. As the male produces sperm and releases it into the water, the female uses its tentacles to capture the sperm to fertilize its eggs.

== Size ==
This jellyfish can measure a maximum of 30.0 cm wide.

== Interactions with humans ==
The species can deliver a painful sting. Symptoms include mild pain, rash, and swelling.
