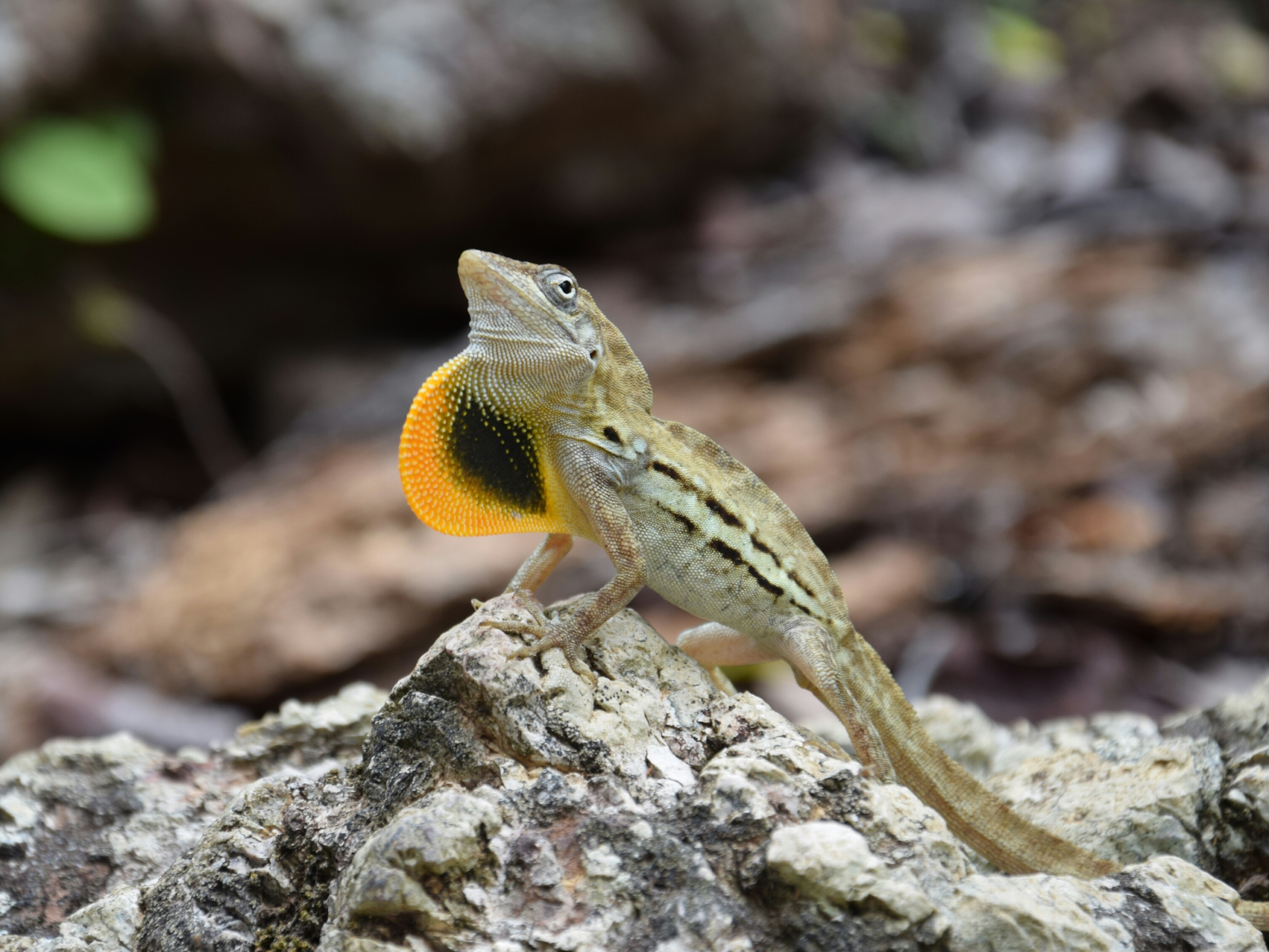

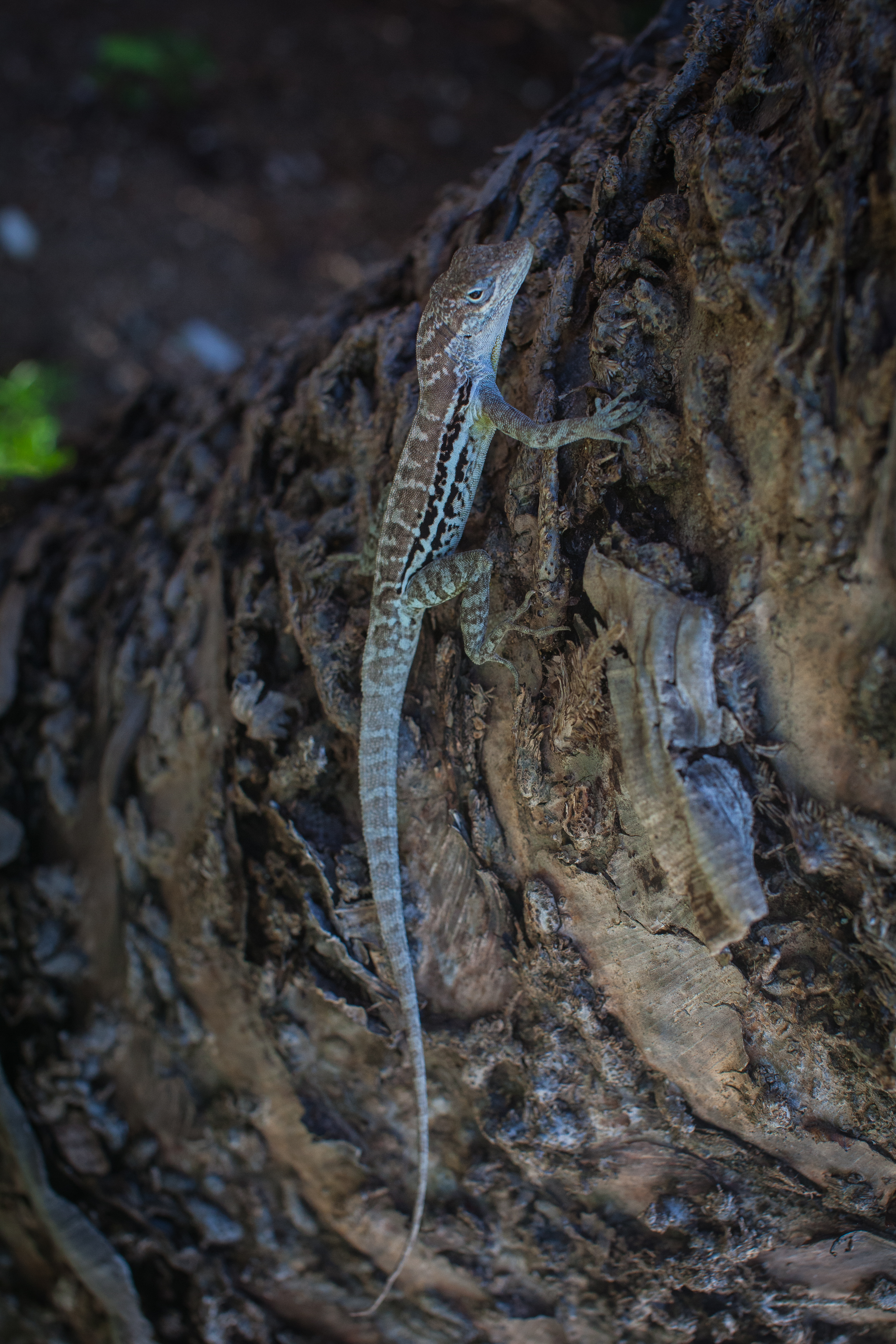
- Male displaying dewlap above, individual on tree below

Conservation status
- Near Threatened (IUCN 3.1)

Scientific classification
- Kingdom: Animalia
- Phylum: Chordata
- Class: Reptilia
- Order: Squamata
- Suborder: Iguania
- Family: Dactyloidae
- Genus: Anolis
- Species: A. lineatus

Binomial name
- Anolis lineatus Daudin, 1802

Synonyms
- Lacerta strumosa Linnaeus, 1758; Norops lineatus (Daudin, 1802); Ptychonotus (Trachycoelia) lineatus (Daudin, 1802)

= Anolis lineatus =

Striped anole

Species of lizard

Anolis lineatus, the Curaçao striped anole or striped anole, is a species of lizard in the family Dactyloidae. It is native to Curaçao and Aruba of the Netherlands Antilles, but has also been introduced to Klein Curaçao. It is generally common (at least on Curaçao), and is particularly common in densely vegetated gardens in the capital Willemstad.

== Taxonomy ==
Anolis lineatus was first formally described in 1802 by the French zoologist François Marie Daudin with no type locality given as the description was from a specimen deposited in the Natural History Museum in Paris and Daudan said it was from "l'Amerique meridionale peut-être même dans les Îles Antilles". This species is a member of the A. chrysolepis species group. of the anole family, the Dactyloidae.

== Description ==
Anolis lineatus has males that reach about 7–7.5 cm (2.8–3.0 in) in snout-to-vent length and the females about 6 cm (2.4 in). It is overall light brownish with a dark-edged pale lateral stripe on each side, and typically several light bars on the body and tail. It has an orange-yellow dewlap with a blackish spot; the dewlap is significantly larger in males than in females. It is the only known species of anole where the dewlap is asymmetrically coloured, being deeper orange on one side and yellower on the other. In almost three-quarter of all individuals the left side is the most yellow. The colour difference between the two sides is indistinct in only a minority of the females.

== Distribution and habitat ==
Anolis lineatus is found on the islands of Aruba and Curaçao which are constituent island countries within the Kingdom of the Netherlands, in the southern Caribbean Sea. It can often be seen on rocks, the walls of buildings or tree trunks; at various heights but often relatively close to the ground.
