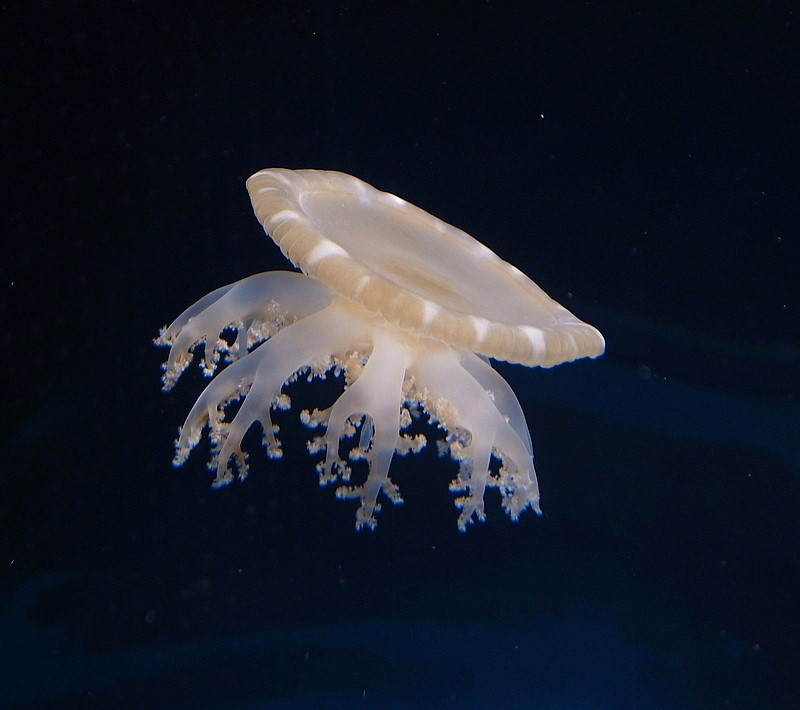
- Specimen at Suma Aqualife Park in Japan

Scientific classification
- Domain: Eukaryota
- Kingdom: Animalia
- Phylum: Cnidaria
- Class: Scyphozoa
- Order: Rhizostomeae
- Family: Cassiopeidae
- Genus: Cassiopea
- Species: C. ornata

Binomial name
- Cassiopea ornata Haeckel, 1880

= Cassiopea ornata =

Species of jellyfish

Cassiopea ornata are one of many Cnidarian species called the upside-down jellyfish. This pelagic jellyfish primarily lives in tropical waters, off the coast of Australia in shallow lagoons and around mangrove trees. The name "upside-down jellyfish" comes from the fact that it appears to be upside-down in its natural state—resting on its bell. Its bell is a golden/brown color and the tentacles vary with different shades of yellow. While the sighting of this particular species is rare, it is usually mistaken for vegetation like the other species in genus Cassiopea.

== Reproduction ==
Cassiopea ornata are a part of the class, Scyphozoa, "the true jelly-fish." Members of this class are gonochoric. As a cnidarian, the cassiopea ornata jellyfish can reproduce both sexually and asexually. When in a medusa form, it will reproduce sexually. The male will produce sperm and release them into the water, while the female produces eggs and keeps them in order to obtain the males sperm and fertilize the eggs. When the jellyfish is in a polyp form, it will reproduce asexually by means of budding.

== Feeding ==
Cassiopea ornata are photosynthetic due to a symbiotic relationship with the zooxanthellae that live below their tentacles. These algae feed on the sun and produce nutrients. The remaining nutrients become food for the jellyfish. These jellyfish are able to thrive because the mutualistic relationship with the algae and rarely have to hunt.

== Geography ==
Cassiopea ornata are pelagic and reside in tropical, shallow waters. The jellyfish have been observed in various locations, including off the coast of Australia, Guam, Philippines, Japan, Indonesia, and Papua New Guinea.
