= Cassiopea ndrosia =

Scientific classification
- Kingdom: Animalia
- Phylum: Cnidaria
- Class: Scyphozoa
- Order: Rhizostomeae
- Family: Cassiopeidae
- Genus: Cassiopea
- Species: C. ndrosia

Binomial name
- Cassiopea ndrosia Agassiz & Mayer, 1899

Species of true jellyfish in the family Cassiopeidae

Cassiopea ndrosia is a species of true jellyfish in the family Cassiopeidae. It has been found in the Pacific Ocean and in waters surrounding Australia and Fiji.

== Etymology ==
The genus name derives from Cassiopeia, a figure in Greek mythology. The specific epithet, ndrosia, was derived from the native Fijian name for the species, ndrosi.

== Description ==
Cassiopea ndrosia has eight oral arms, around 30 mm (1.2 in) in length, that have suction-mouths and leaf-shaped vesicles on their lower surface. The upper portions of these arms can range from white to slightly gray; the suction-mouths are surrounded by small tentacles that are a deep brown color, and the vesicles are an olive-green. It has four sub-genital cavities, and four gonads. Its bell is disk-shaped and flat, and is around 50 mm (1.9 in) in diameter. The number of rhopalia can vary, with the original description noting there were instances of specimens having 18 and 22. The rhopalia are equidistant from each other. It has two sets of muscle bands; a number of these, in the lower bell, radiate towards the rhopalia. These bands are opaque and white, while those on the top of the bell are a deep blue-green color. The bell is mostly an ashy brown, otherwise. Each rhopalium has a white spot on its radius, and there are often four white streaks between each adjacent pair of rhopalia. Additionally, there are several white spots on the inner area of the lower bell. It has four small pores, or ostia, in the sub-genital area.
