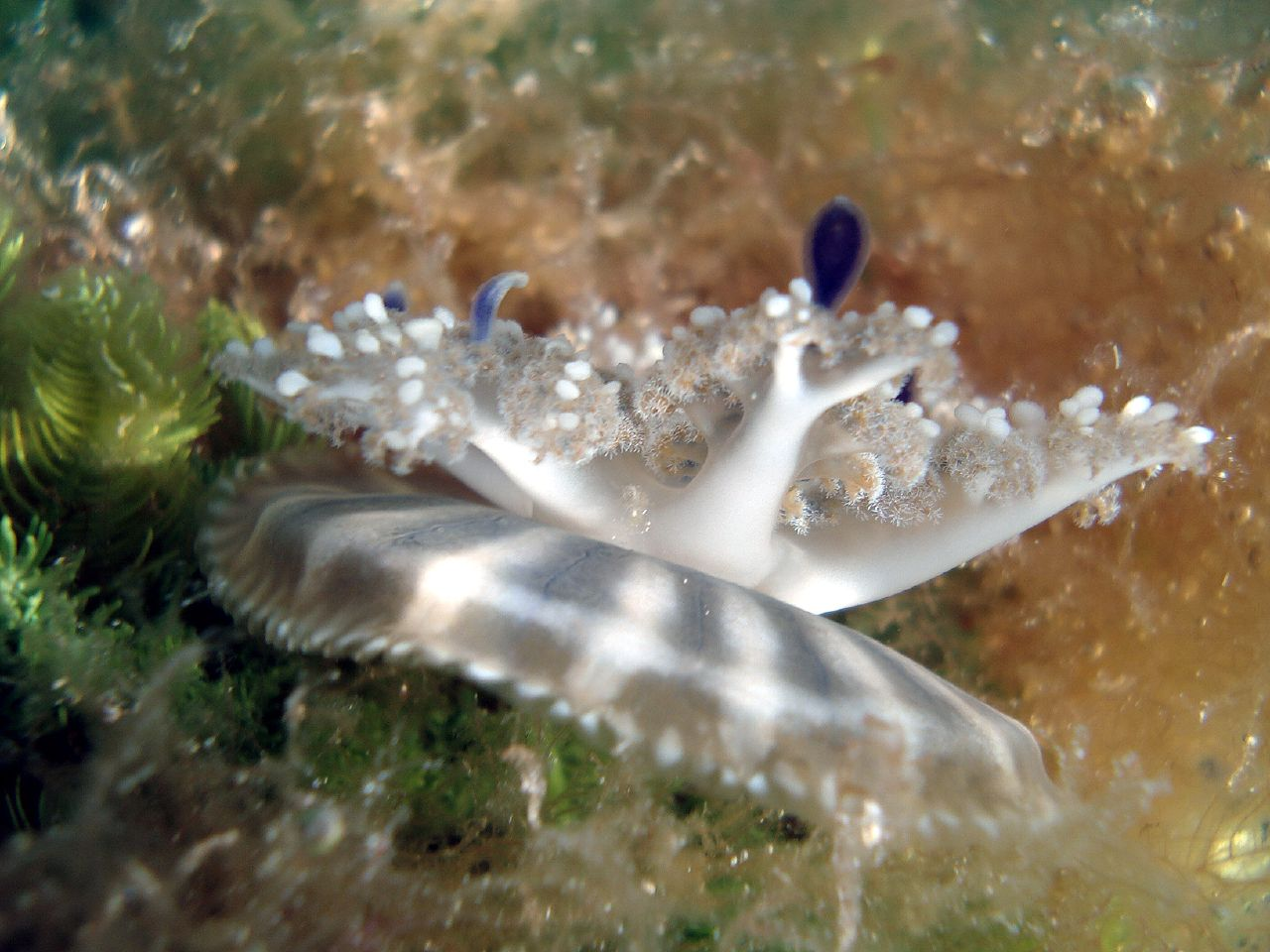
- Cassiopea sp.

Scientific classification
- Kingdom: Animalia
- Phylum: Cnidaria
- Class: Scyphozoa
- Order: Rhizostomeae
- Family: Cassiopeidae; Agassiz, 1862
- Genus: Cassiopea; Péron & Lesueur, 1809

Species
- 11 species, see text

Synonyms
- Cassiopeia Gistl, 1848; Cassiopeja Schultze, 1898

= Cassiopea =

Genus of jellyfishes

Cassiopea (upside-down jellyfish) is a genus of true jellyfish in the family Cassiopeidae. They are found in warmer coastal regions around the world, including shallow mangrove swamps, mudflats, canals, shallow lagoons and bays, and turtle grass flats in Florida, the Caribbean, Hawaii, the Red Sea, the Mediterranean Sea, and Micronesia. The medusa usually lives upside-down on the sea floor in shallow areas, which has earned them their common name. They have a symbiotic relationship with photosynthetic dinoflagellates and therefore must lie upside-down in areas with sufficient light. Where found, there may be numerous individuals with varying shades of white, blue, green, and brown. They have distinctive methods of reproduction and prey capture, and are unusual in that they appear to sleep despite lacking a brain. At least one species has been found to release stinging cells in its mucus.

== Species ==
According to the World Register of Marine Species, the genus includes 11 species:

- Cassiopea andromeda (Forsskål, 1775)—Indo-Pacific, introduced in the Mediterranean
- Cassiopea culionensis Light, 1914
- Cassiopea depressa Haeckel, 1880—Western Indian Ocean off the African coast
- Cassiopea frondosa (Pallas, 1774)—Western Atlantic, Caribbean Sea
- Cassiopea mayeri Gamero-Mora, Collins, Boco, Geson III & Morandini, 2022
- Cassiopea medusa Light, 1914—Pacific Ocean, Philippines and Palau Region
- Cassiopea mertensi Brandt, 1838—Pacific Ocean Southern Micronesia
- Cassiopea ndrosia Agassiz & Mayer, 1899—Pacific Ocean, Australia and Fiji
- Cassiopea ornata Haeckel, 1880—Pacific Ocean, Palau, Philippines, Okinawa
- Cassiopea vanderhorsti Stiasny, 1924
- Cassiopea xamachana Bigelow, 1892—Caribbean Sea and the Northern Atlantic Area of the West indies

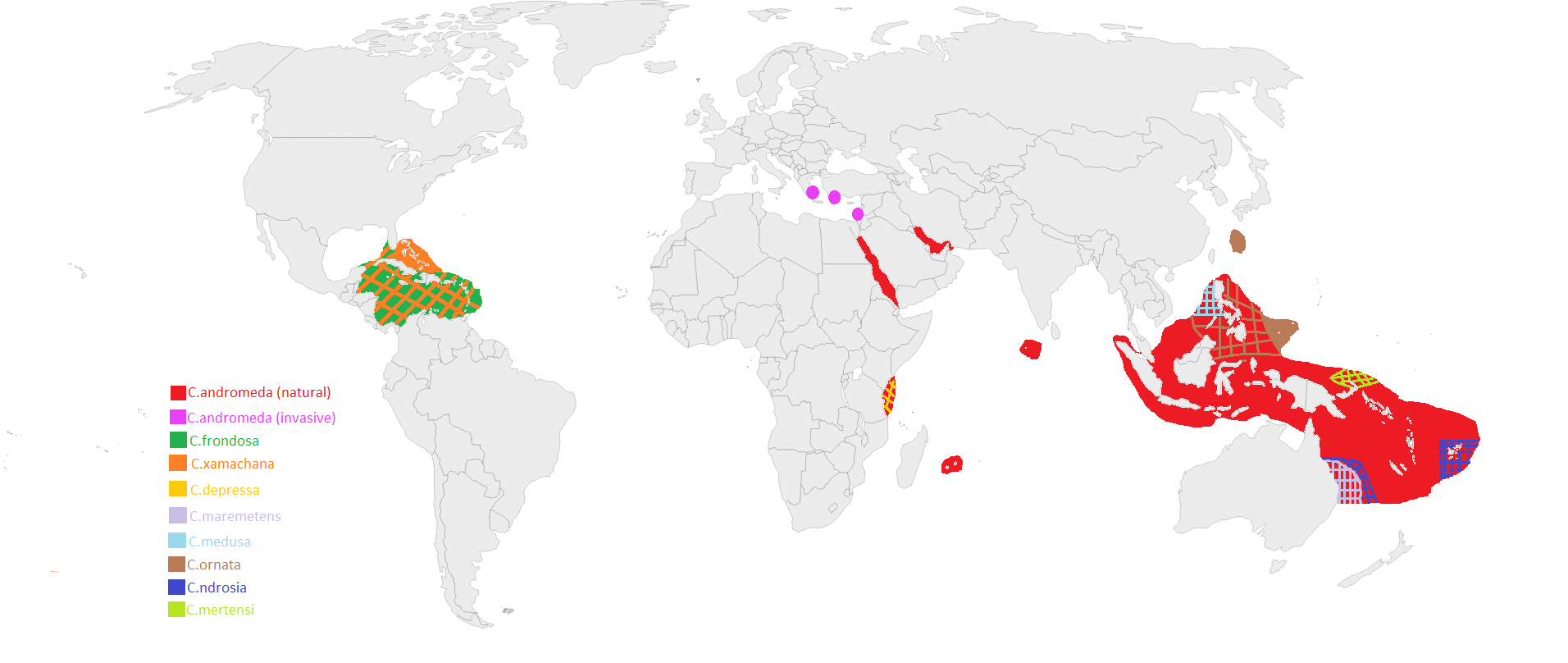
Cassiopea Species Distribution Map

Multiple species of Cassiopea are considered to be invasive and were unintentionally introduced to new geographic regions throughout the 19th and 20th centuries with the expansion of global maritime trade. As a result of ships passing through the Suez Canal from the Red Sea, Cassiopea andromeda populations spread to the canal as early as 1888 and were later reported in areas of the Mediterranean Sea. The upside-down jellyfish now thrive in coastal reef systems and rocky, shallow volcanic pools of Malta, Cyprus, the Aegean Sea, and the Levantine Sea. Cassiopea spread to Pearl Harbor in the 1940s, and subsequently continued its invasion to Moloka'i, Hawai'i, and other coastal regions of O'ahu. Recent developments of antifoulant coating systems and ballast sterilization techniques for ships have significantly reduced the chance of the accidental international spread of jellyfish.

== Anatomy ==
Different colors and tentacle shapes of the Cassiopea colored vesicles in Curacao population

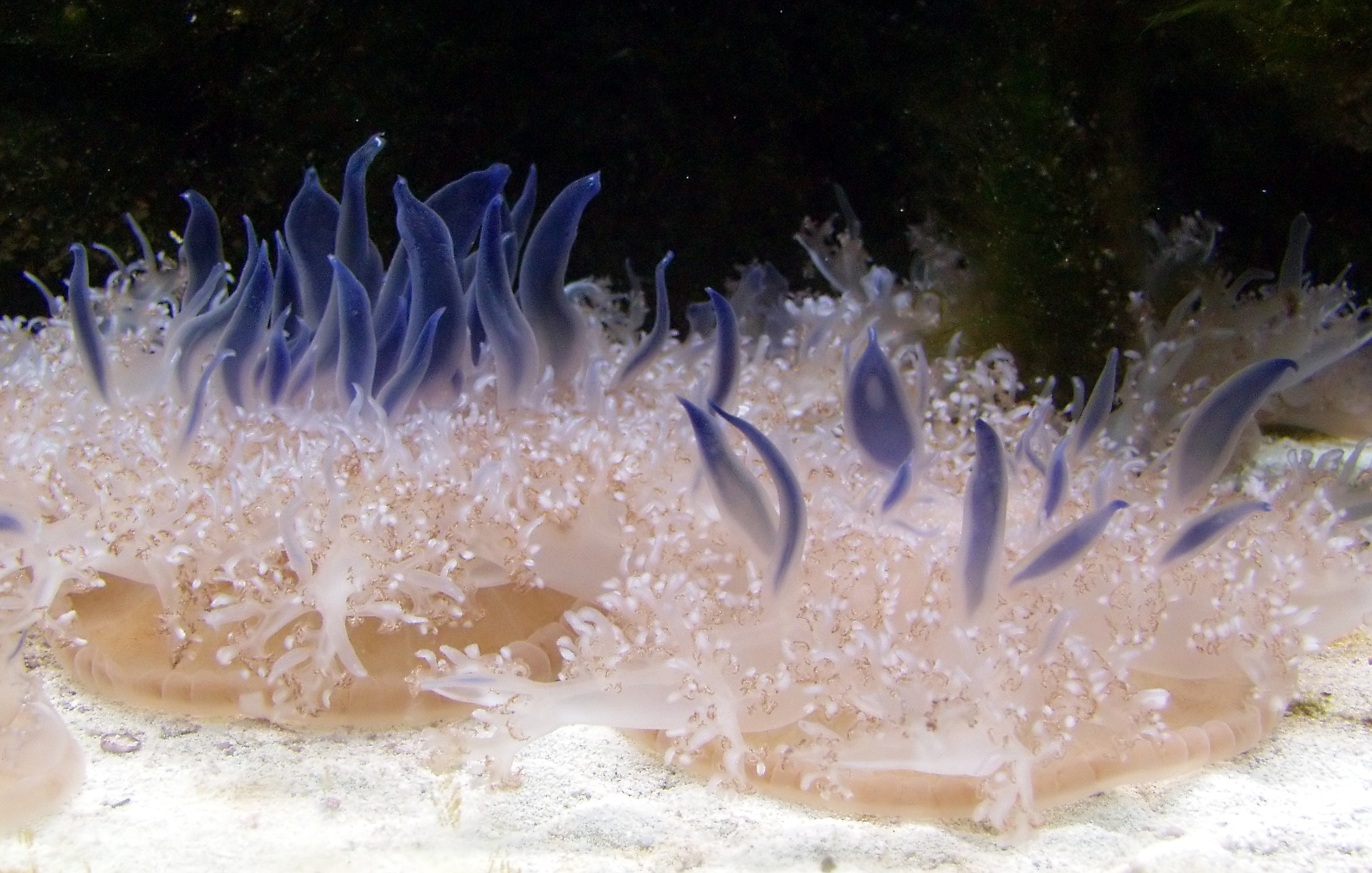
Close-up of Cassiopea andromeda tentacles: oral arms (small, frilly, brown and white) and colored vesicles (large, flat, smooth, blue)

Cassiopea are true jellyfish that have many common components including a soft, umbrella-like bell and tentacles that are used for feeding. Unlike most other jellyfish, the upside-down jellyfish swims infrequently and spends most of its life with its bell on the ground and the underside pointing upward.

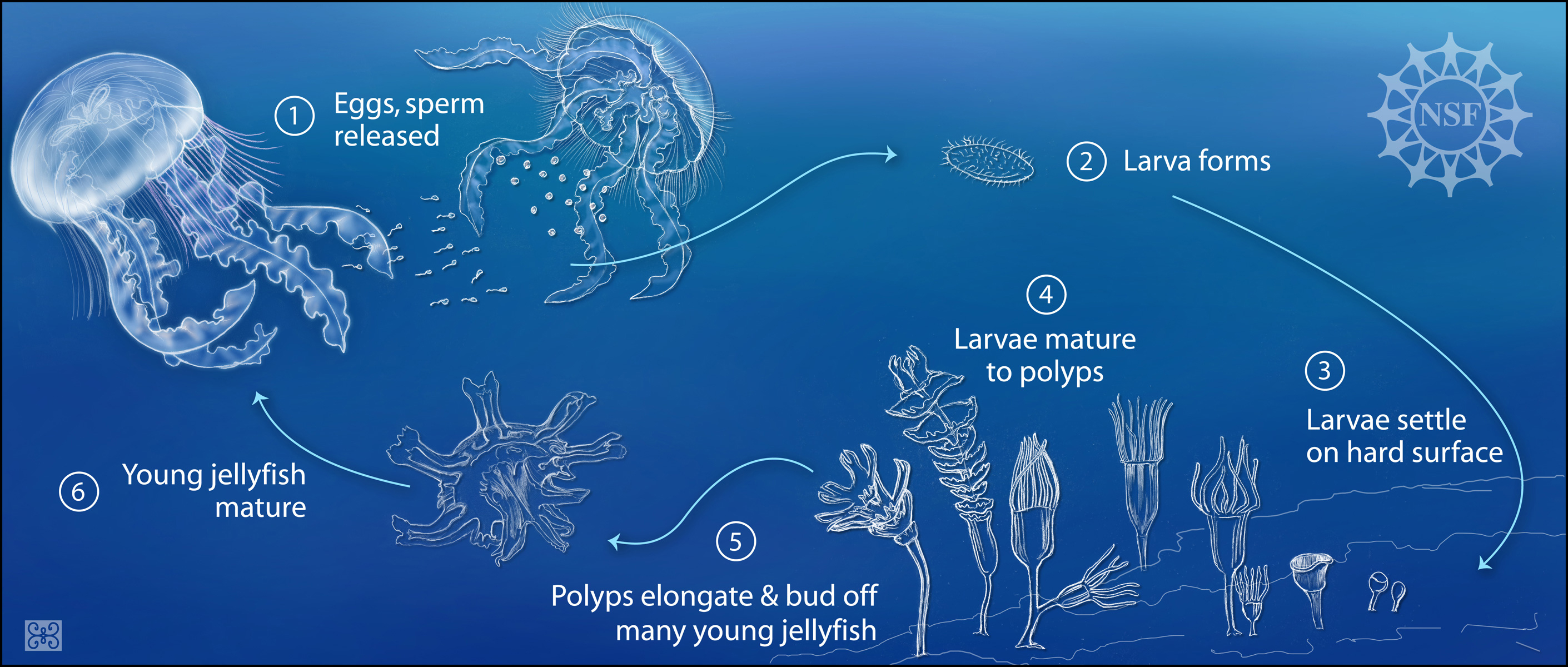
Standard reproductive cycle of a jellyfish

Cassiopea have two main types of tentacles. The feeding tentacles, or oral arms, are short and frilly with intricate branches; this shape maximizes their surface area and allows the algae colonies that live within the tissue to photosynthesize more effectively. The tentacles are also capable of stinging and capturing prey (see “Feeding habits” section below). The other type of tentacles, the colored vesicles, can occur in a wide variety of shapes and colors. Scientists do not yet understand the purpose of this color exhibition and are not yet able to identify which inherent or environmental factors influence coloration.

== Reproduction ==
Cassiopea medusa are gonochoristic, being either strictly male or female. Like other jellyfish, they have a gastrovascular cavity with only one opening. This is where fertilization primarily occurs. After fertilization, the embryos are expelled and attach to the oral disc, where they remain brooding for 48 hours. The embryo will develop into ciliated planula (mobile larvae) that swim through the water and search for a suitable location for its next life stage. These larvae will attach to a substrate and metamorphose into the stationary polyp stage of its life cycle. The polyp acquires the symbiont algae colony, usually through feeding or absorption (see “Symbiotic Relationship” section below). Polyps reproduce asexually via budding – to create more polyps – and strobilation – to produce ephyra (juvenile medusa). Cassiopea strobilation only occurs after the symbiotic algae colony has been established within the polyp. The ephyra will find a suitable shallow area where it will develop into a mature medusa, completing the cycle.

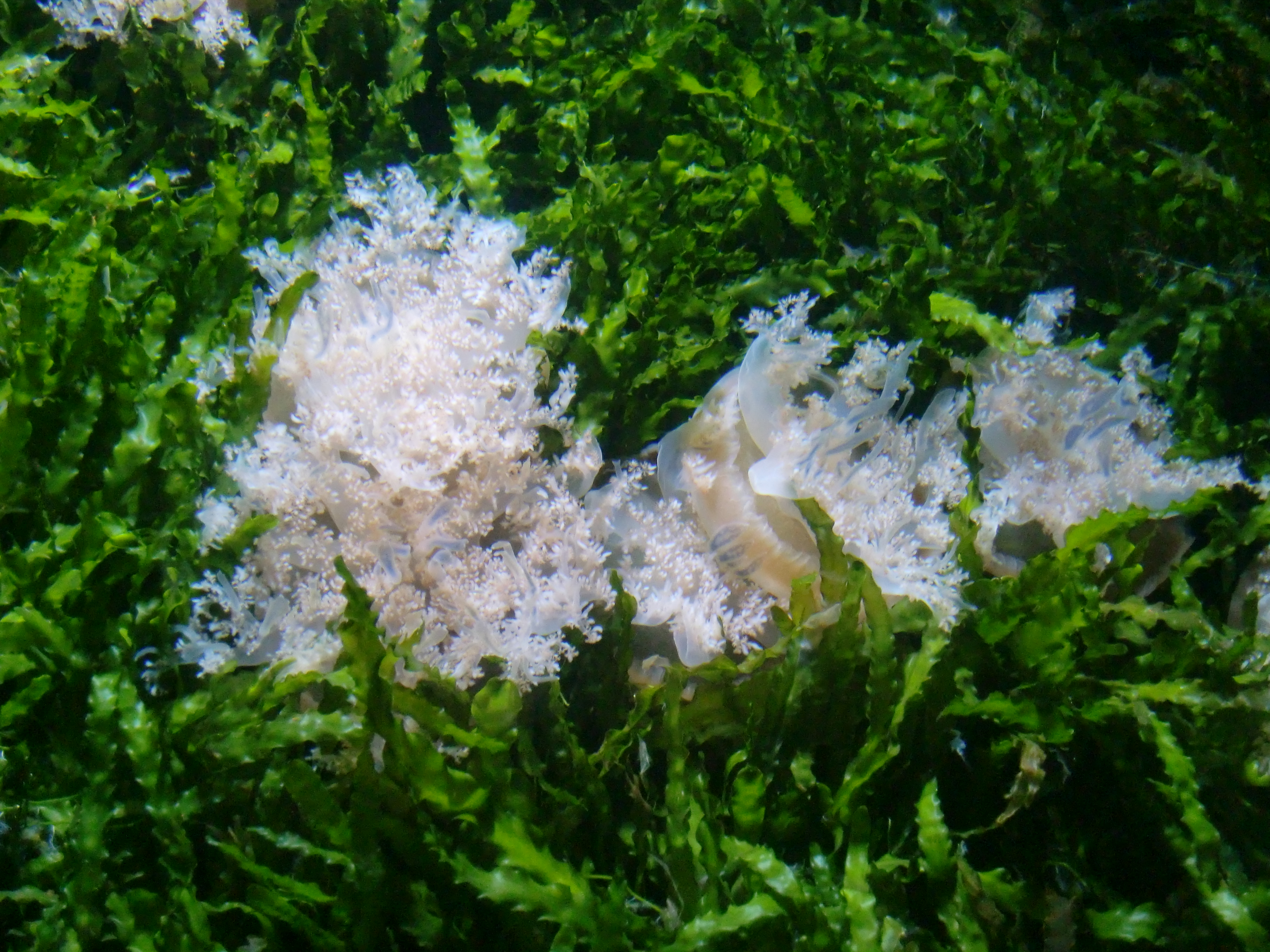
Cassiopea sp. in seaweed

== Sleep state ==
Certain species of Cassiopea have been observed to enter a sleep state, displaying three primary characteristics. These are quiescence, also known as inactivity or dormancy, delayed responsiveness to stimuli (or sensory depression), and homeostatic regulation, allowing them to remain stable despite changes in the outside environment. They are the first animals lacking a central nervous system to have been observed sleeping. When Cassiopea are provoked, they release mucus that contains toxic proteins.

== Swimming ==
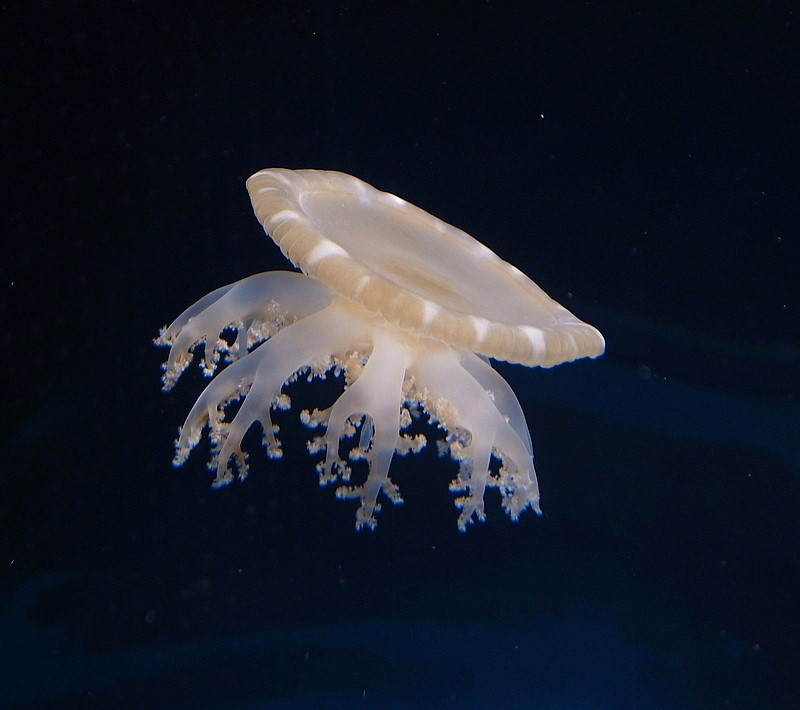
Cassiopea ornata swimming

The method of swimming in Cassiopea is unique to jellyfish. They create their own propulsive water currents when changing direction by contracting a mushroom-shaped part of their body called the bell. This contraction creates whirlpools that are broken up as they flow between the oral arms, producing a constant flow of water towards the animal and an upward flow above it. Unlike most pelagic, free-swimming jellyfish, Cassiopea spends most of its life on the sea floor photosynthesizing, and will only swim short distances. When the bell pulsates against the bottom layer, small water currents are produced; this flow supports the jellyfish feeding process and circulates nutrients through the shallow water column.

== Symbiotic relationship ==
Upside-down jellyfish obtain approximately 90% of their dietary needs through the zooxanthelle algae, Symbiodiniaceae, that lives in their tissue. The jellyfish have a symbiotic relationship with the algae colony: the algae is protected within the tissues of the jellyfish, and receives ample sunlight and inorganic nutrients from the jellyfish necessary for photosynthesis; and the algae produces glycerol and glucose that the jellyfish is able to consume. This relationship is what requires the jellyfish to spend much of its medusa stage sedentary and “upside-down” in the shallow water that they inhabit, so the tissue is exposed to sunlight to allow the algae to photosynthesize.

Algae usually enter Cassiopea during the polyp stage of the jellyfish lifecycle, where polyps may uptake multiple species and clades of algae depending on what is available in the environment. By the medusa stage of the life cycle, there is typically only one clade present per individual, but the clade may vary between neighboring individuals in the same environment.

Upside-down jellyfish population in Salina Jan Kok salt flats in Curacao

The success of this symbiotic relationship, especially under the harsh environmental stressors found in the shallow-water environment – including high temperatures, intense UV exposure, and wide variety of salinity and turbidity – is being studied closely, especially as its adaptations could have important ramifications for coral bleaching and climate change response. Due to the nutritional requirements for the algae to photosynthesize, Cassiopea is also being studied as a promising bioindicator for nutrient presence, especially for near-shore environments concerned about excessive dissolved inorganic phosphate (DIP) from community pollution and runoff.

== Feeding habits ==
Cassiopea species obtain approximately 10% of their nutritional needs via predation. This jellyfish feeds by pulsating its bell – which has a slight indent in its center that helps it remain relatively fixed against the sea floor – to circulate the surrounding water, increasing water flow over its oral surfaces and thus improving its chances of encountering prey. The pulsation usually consists of alternating power strokes where the bell fully contracts, and recovery strokes where the bell fully relaxes. This pulsation cycle is marginally influenced by factors including environmental currents, other nearby medusae, and UV intensity.

Like other true jellyfish, Cassiopea have stinging cells called nematocysts that stun its prey. The nematocysts are barb-like structures that require certain physical and chemical stimuli to be triggered, and they release a neurotoxin into their prey. While the sting from these jellyfish is paralytic to smaller marine species, it can cause mild to moderate pain and dermatitis in humans.

Once Cassiopea catches its prey, they pull it towards the center with their frilly, branching oral arms. They hold the prey in place using small oral vesicles attached to the arms, fragmenting it and passing it into secondary mouths, where it is digested by ciliated cells. They are opportunistic predators, feeding on crustaceans, nematodes, and eggs.
