= Cassiopea frondosa =

Scientific classification
- Kingdom: Animalia
- Phylum: Cnidaria
- Class: Scyphozoa
- Order: Rhizostomeae
- Family: Cassiopeidae
- Genus: Cassiopea
- Species: C. frondosa

Binomial name
- Cassiopea frondosa (Pallas, 1774)

Species of jellyfish

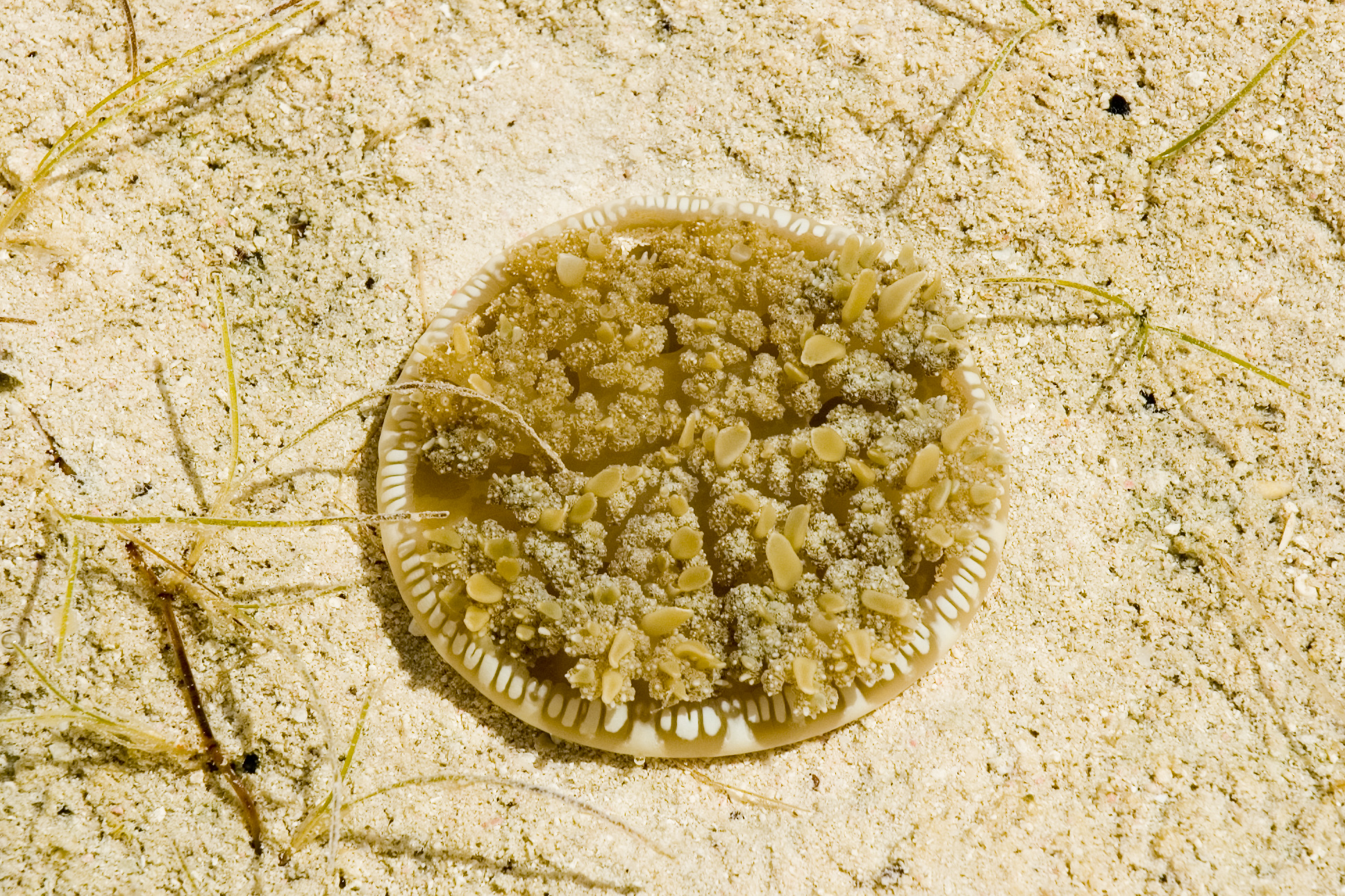

Cassiopea frondosa is a species of jellyfish, also known as the upside-down jellyfish, belonging to the family Cassiopeidae.

== Description ==
Cassiopea frondosa was one of the first species described of Cassiopeia. It was found in 1774 by Pallas, around the Caribbean.

C. frondosa has a bell measuring around less than 15 cm in diameter, and has 12 sensory organs called rhopalia. This jellyfish has a unique position, unlike others, with its bell down and its short oral arms facing up. It is the only species in its group that can be clearly distinguished from others because of its size and unique features. C. frondosa come in a variety of colors; brown, blue, green, or mixes of different colors. Their color is contributed from their environment and from their symbiotic relationship with zooxanthellae.

C. frondosa have stinging cells called nematocysts found all along their tentacles. They can also release toxins through their mucus into the water to capture prey or for protection.

They are found in tropical/subtropical marine waters, mangroves, lagoons, and the Caribbean. Usually they are benthic, using the current of the water as its motion and for gas exchange.

== Habitat ==
Upside-down jellyfishes live in warm subtropical marine waters such as the Bahamas, parts of Florida, and the Caribbean. They are considered to be around the mangroves or seagrass ecosystems.

== Diet ==
Cassiopea frondosa has a symbiotic relationship with dinoflagellate algae. One of the zooxanthellae that lives within C. frondosa is Symbiodinium microadriaticum. These algae live within the jellyfish and help provide nutrients through photosynthesis. The jellyfish in turn will protect it and offer it sunlight. Due to being upside-down, they can receive more exposure to sunlight, keeping the algae maintained. They can also be carnivorous, feeding on small benthic crustaceans, zooplankton, and detritus. They do this by using their bell to pulsating the water up and filtering out the prey.

== Life cycle and reproduction ==
Cassiopea frondosa are gonochoric, meaning they are either male or female. They are seen to have a high regeneration population. The cycle starts with the adult medusa laying an egg; after some time, it becomes a free-floating planula. Then the planula will start to settle to the bottom, and later become free-floating medusas.
