= Jennie Janssen =

American aquarist

Jennie Dee Janssen
- Scientific career
- Institutions: National Aquarium; Smithsonian Museum of Natural History

Jennifer (Jennie) Dee Janssen is an aquarist at the National Aquarium in Baltimore, Maryland. Since 2003, she has worked at the Tennessee Aquarium Ripley's Aquarium of the Smokies, Georgia Aquarium, and the National Aquarium, and she is a research associate at the Smithsonian National Museum of Natural History. She is the co-founder of the non-profit organization Minorities in Aquarium and Zoo Science, whose mission is to advance aquarium and zoo science by diversifying the people and perspectives within these fields. She has been recognized with numerous awards including the Top 10 of the Blooloop 50 Zoo & Aquarium Influencer List in 2022.

== Career ==
=== Early career ===
Janssen graduated from Paint Branch High School in Burtonsville, Maryland. She obtained a Bachelor of Science in Biology from Southern Adventist University in Collegedale, Tennessee in 1999, during which she did an internship under Dr. George Benz working on parasitology of sharks. She went on to earn a Master of Science in Biology from Andrews University in Berrien Springs, Michigan in 2007. Early on during her academic career she took an interest in marine conservation and participated in lemon shark research at the Bimini Biological Field Station. Her shark conservation efforts took her around the world including Taiwan where she worked with diverse sharks and rays for conservation focused aquariums. Janssen worked as a senior aquarist at the Georgia Aquarium, where she participated in opening and maintaining one of the aquarium's marquis exhibits, Ocean Voyager, and its inhabitants including whale sharks, manta rays, great hammerheads, and a variety of sawfish, guitarfish, benthic rays, and teleost.

=== Current activities ===
In 2012, Janssen moved to the National Aquarium as the manager of Changing Exhibits in Baltimore, MD. Since March 2017, she an assistant curator of Blue Wonders in the department of Animal Care and Welfare where she manages the jellyfish, coral reef, large marine fish exhibits, and culture lab. In 2021, Janssen was one of the creators of Kraken Curriculum, an award-winning (Best of Session (Aquarium and Zoo Science) and Best of Conference at the 2022 POSea Conference) online professional development curriculum for aquatic animal care professionals in partnership with AnimalProfessional.com. The curriculum provides training for aquatic animal care professionals. That same year she co-founded Minorities in Aquarium and Zoo Science, a 501(c)(3) nonprofit organization to advance aquarium and zoo science by diversifying the individuals and perspectives within those fields. As of Fall 2023, Minorities in Aquarium and Zoo Science has grown to a membership network of 182. Janssen leads the International Census of Chondrichthyans in Human Care and serves on the Association of Zoos & Aquariums professional development committee.

== Select publications ==
Ames, C.L., Klompen, A. M. L., Badhiwala, K., Muffett, K., Reft, A. J., Kumar, M., Janssen, J. D., Schultzhaus, J. N., Field, L. D., Muroski, M. E., Bezio, N., Robinson, J. T., Leary, D. H., Cartwright, P., Collins, A. G. & Vora, G. J. Cassiosomes are stinging-cell structures in the mucus of the upside-down jellyfish Cassiopea xamachana. Communications Biology 3, 67 (2020). https://doi.org/10.1038/s42003-020-0777-8

Janssen, J. D., Kidd, A., Ferreira, A. & Snowden, S. (2017). Training and Conditioning of Elasmobranchs in Aquaria In Smith, M., D. Warmolts, D. Thoney, R. Hueter, M. Murray, and J. Ezcurra (Eds.) The Elasmobranch Husbandry Manual II: Recent Advances in the Care of Sharks, Rays and their Relatives (pp. 209–221). Columbus, OH: Ohio Biological Survey

Janssen, J. D., Mutch, G. W. & Hayward, J. L.: Taphonomic effects of high temperature on avian eggshell. Palaios, 2011, v. 26, p. 658-664. http://dx.doi.org/10.2110/palo.2011.p11-012r
