= Caquetio =

Natives of northwestern Venezuela and the ABC islands

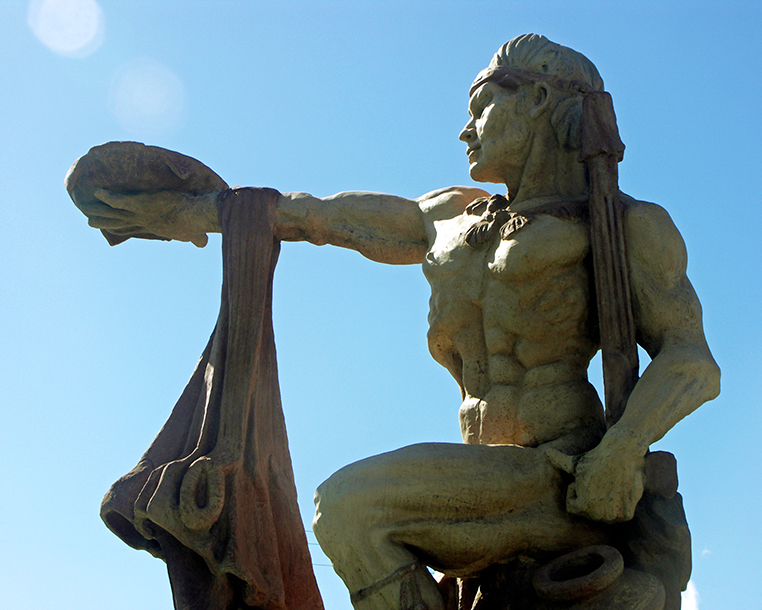
- Statue of cacique Manaure (chief of the Caquetíos) at Plaza Manaure in Coro, Venezuela.

Regions with significant populations
- Venezuela, Aruba, Curaçao, Bonaire

Languages
- Caquetío (formerly)

Religion
- Traditional religion

Related ethnic groups
- Arawak, Quiriquire, Jirajara

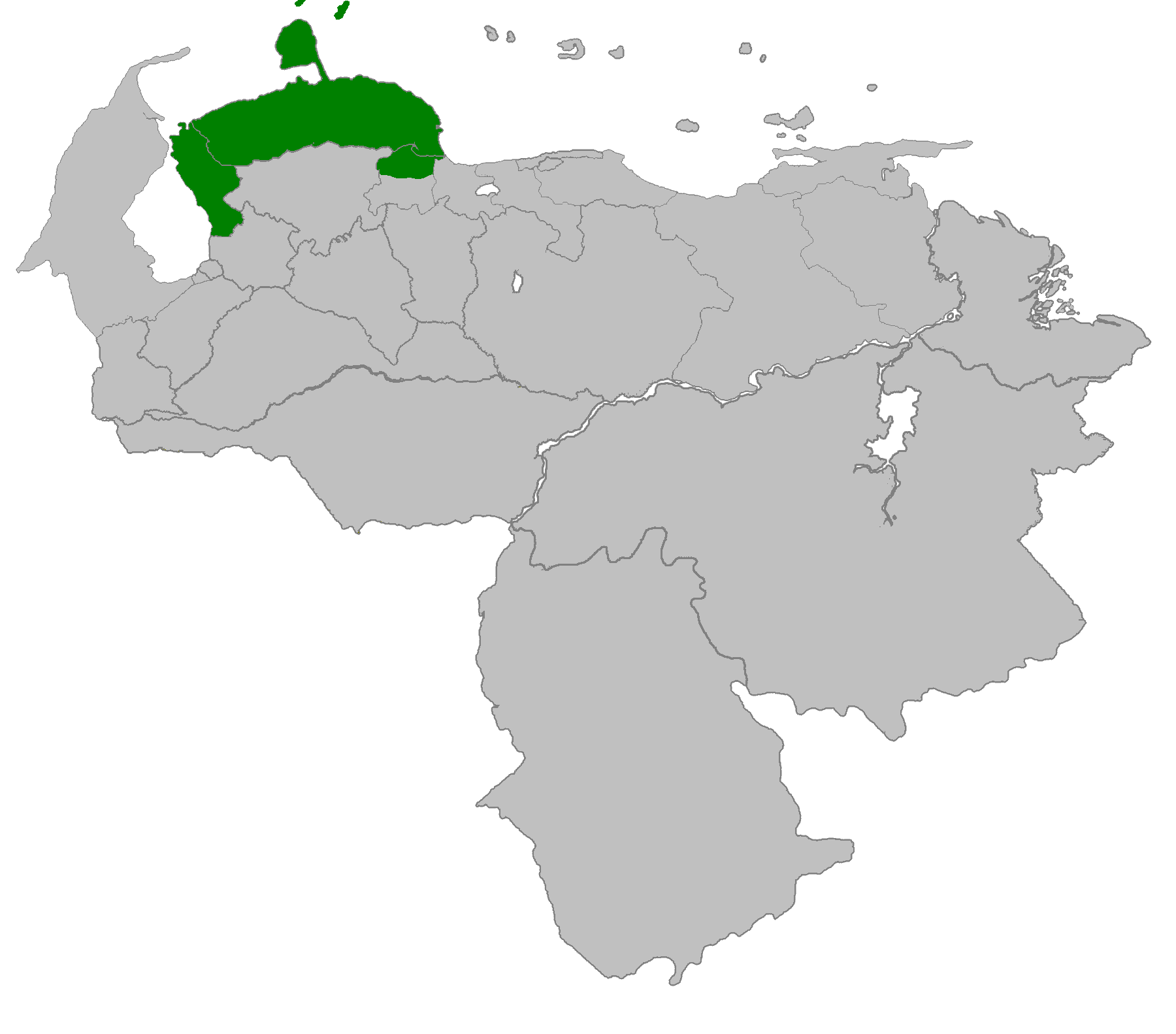
Nation of the Caquetíos under Cacique Manaure

The Caquetío are the Indigenous people of northwestern Venezuela, as well as the islands of Aruba, Curaçao and Bonaire. The Caquetío along with their neighbors, the Jirajara and Quiriquire tribes, were largely diminished due to Spanish colonization. Although no full-blooded Caquetío remain today, genetic research indicates Indigenous DNA can still be found in the modern populations of Aruba and northwestern Venezuela, which may suggest Caquetío DNA.

== Aruba, Curaçao and Bonaire ==
When the Spanish arrived in Aruba around 1500 they found the Caquetío in Aruba, living much as they did in the Stone Age. The Caquetío had probably migrated to Aruba, Curaçao and Bonaire in canoes made from hollowed-out logs they used for fishing. Such crossings from the Paraguana peninsula in Venezuela, across the 17 miles (27 km) of open sea to Aruba, would be possible in the canoes the Caquetío of Venezuela built.

According to Dutch government records, the last full-blooded Caquetío of the island, Nicolaas Pyclas, died in Aruba in 1843, although Caquetío ancestry is still prevalent in Arubans to this day. Recent Mitochondrial DNA analysis in Aruba has shown the presence of significant Amerindian DNA in the modern Aruban population. Traces of the Caquetío language can also be found in the language of the ABC islands, known as Papiamento.

=== Spanish period ===
During the first years of colonization, the natives of Aruba were described by the Spaniards as Caquetíos. In addition, the Caquetíos in the mainland were the tribe geographically closest to Aruba, and archaeological evidence points towards close ties between both groups during pre-Columbian times. Perhaps as many as 600 lived in Aruba at the time of the Spanish arrival in 1499.

Together with Curaçao and Bonaire, Aruba was declared an island without use in 1513, and two years later some 2,000 Caquetíos from the three islands combined were forcibly brought to Hispaniola to work in mines. These people presumably comprised the entire population of the islands, but 150 to 200 were returned to Aruba and Curaçao in 1526 to work on the exportation of brazilwood, kwihi, and divi-divi. The people returned to Aruba and Curaçao were mainly Caquetíos, but some Arawaks from other Caribbean islands were included in the group. Because of the complexity of the Aruba cave labyrinths, it is possible that they were mostly natives who had escaped deportation, but they could have been recent migrants from the mainland. In addition, substantial mainland-to-Aruba migrations of escapees occurred from 1529 to 1556, during the development of the Venezuelan colony (Haviser, 1991).

=== Dutch period ===
Aruba was neglected by the Spaniards from 1533 until the Dutch conquest of 1636, when Spanish and native languages (especially Caquetío) were widely spoken. Upon the Dutch conquest the Spaniards fled, and the natives were deported to the mainland because they were regarded as sympathetic to the Spaniards. However, in that same year of 1636, the Dutch West India Company (WIC) assigned Aruba the duty of breeding horses and cattle, and natives were chosen for these endeavors because they had a good reputation as wild-horse hunters. Also, some in war with Spaniards west of Maracaibo fled to Aruba.

The importance of Aruba diminished after the 1648 Peace of Münster treaty was signed between the Netherlands and Spain, and the island was neglected again. In 1655, the Dutch West Indian Company recognized free inhabitants of Aruba as trade partners. These people were assigned a piece of land on which to maintain themselves through cultivation; they also cut and sold wood and exploited marine resources. Alexandre Exquemelin, who wrote about his experiences as a buccaneer in the Caribbean, gives a description of the Aruban way of life during the second half of the 17th century. Exquemelin said the people spoke Spanish, were Catholic, and were visited frequently by Spanish priests from the mainland. As an example of their strong links with the mainland, some 200 residents agreed to leave Aruba in 1723 to raise the Venezuelan town of El Carrizal under the ecclesiastic jurisdiction of the city of Coro.

== Venezuela and Colombia ==
16th-century chronicler Juan de Castellanos said: "This nation is very large, but lives in many areas separated from each other." The Caquetío settled not only in the coastal region in the west of what is now Venezuela, but in at least two other regions: the valley of Barquisimeto in the state of Lara and in what is now Colombia's Llanos Orientales. In the fertile valley of Barquisimeto, according to Nikolaus Federmann, the first conquistador to enter their land, there were 23 large settlements and they could muster 30,000 warriors. According to reports from the chroniclers Juan de Castellanos and Gonzalo Fernández de Oviedo y Valdés, they inhabited the savannas from the Apure River in the north to beyond the Casanare River in the south. The west–east extension of the "Grassland Caquetío" was from the edge of the Andes to far into the savannas, possibly as far as the Rio Meta.

== Bibliography ==
- (1948). Handbook of South American Indians. Volume 4. Washington: Smithsonian Institution.
- Hertog, Johannes (1961). History of the Netherlands Antilles. Dewitt.
- Hutkrantz, Ake (1979). The Religions of the American Indians. M. Setterwall, trans. Berkeley: University of California Press.
- Steward, Julian et al., eds (1959). Native Peoples of South America. New York: McGraw Hill.
- Gonzalo Fernández de Oviedo y Valdés: Historia General y Natural de las Indias. Madrid 1959.
- Juan de Castellanos: Elegías de varones ilustres de Indias. Bogotá 1997.
- Indianische Historia; Nicolaus Federmann. Introduction by Juan Friede. München 1965.
- Leendert van der Valk (2026). Vergeten plekken, vergeten mensen. Boom.
