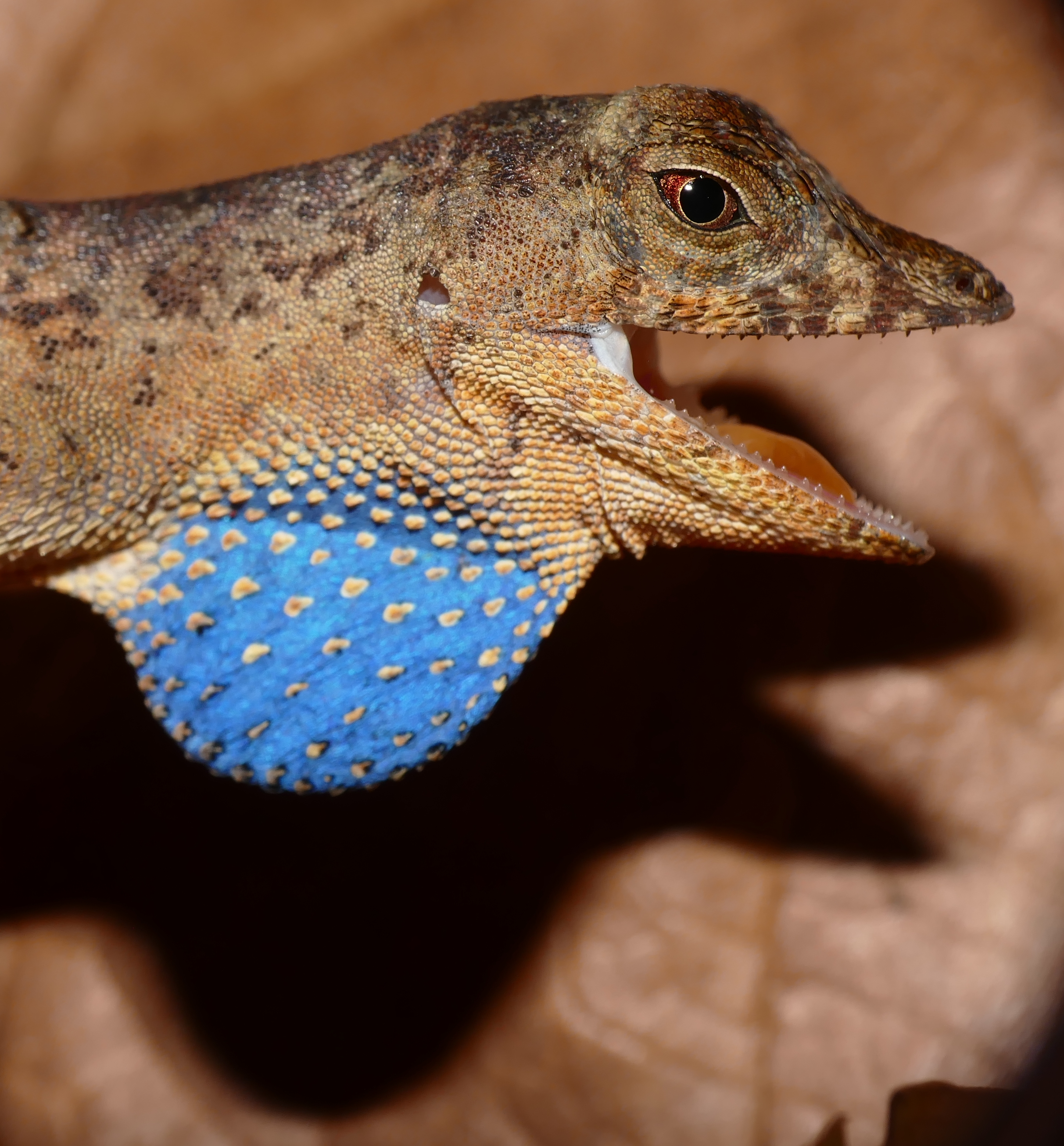

Conservation status
- Least Concern (IUCN 3.1)

Scientific classification
- Kingdom: Animalia
- Phylum: Chordata
- Class: Reptilia
- Order: Squamata
- Suborder: Iguania
- Family: Dactyloidae
- Genus: Anolis
- Species: A. chrysolepis

Binomial name
- Anolis chrysolepis Duméril and Bibron, 1837

= Anolis chrysolepis =

Species of lizard

Anolis chrysolepis, the goldenscale anole, is a species of lizard in the family Dactyloidae. The species is found in Guyana, Suriname, French Guiana, and Brazil.

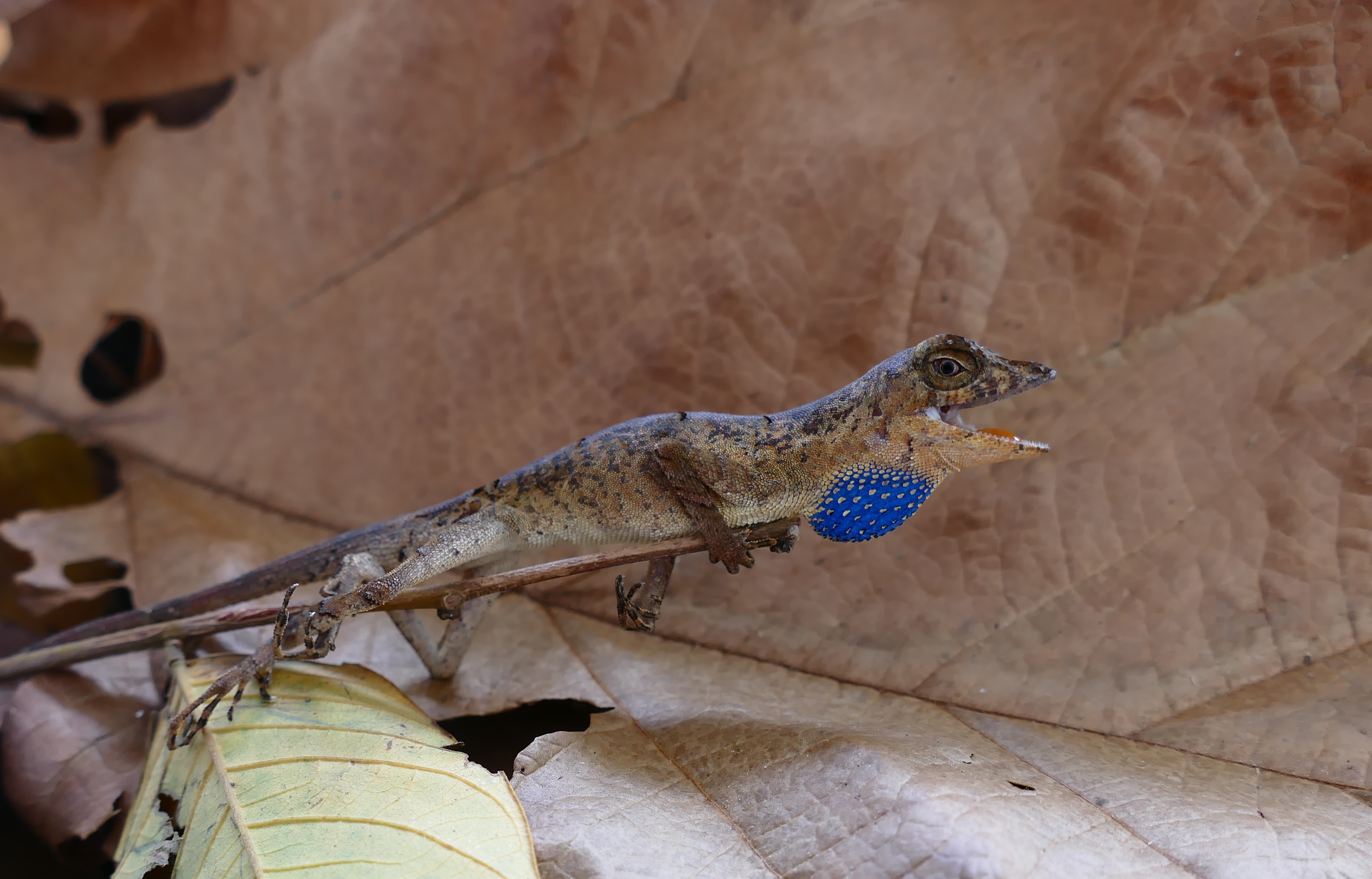
Male, French Guiana

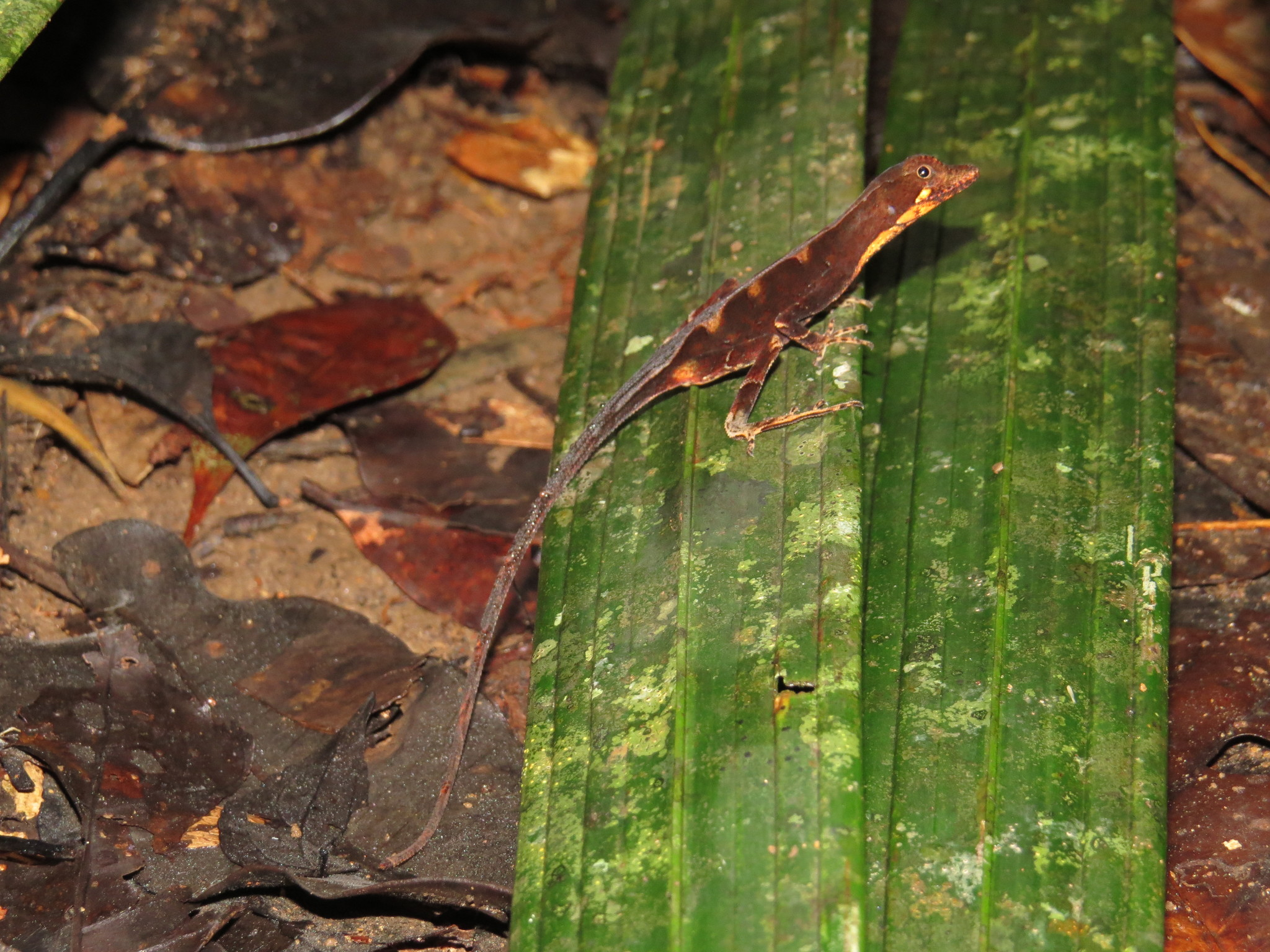
Goldenscale anole, French Guiana
