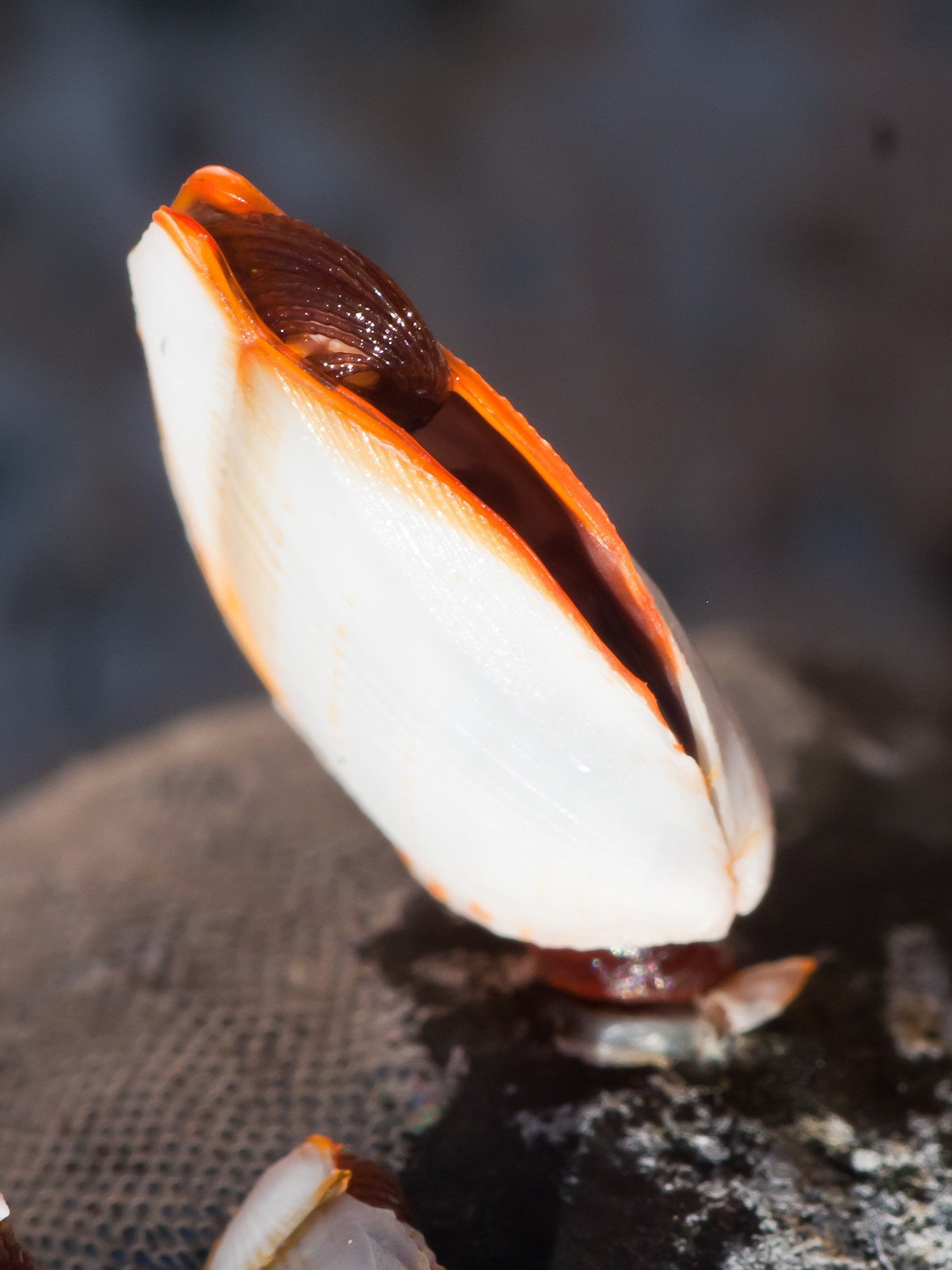
- Lepas anatifera - Quintana Roo - Mexico.

Scientific classification
- Domain: Eukaryota
- Kingdom: Animalia
- Phylum: Arthropoda
- Class: Thecostraca
- Order: Lepadiformes

= Lepadiformes =

Order of crustaceans

Lepadiformes is an order of crustaceans belonging to the class Maxillopoda.

Families:

- Anelasmatidae Gruvel, 1905
- Heteralepadidae Nilsson-Cantell, 1921
- Koleolepadidae Hiro, 1933
- Lepadidae Darwin, 1852
- Malacolepadidae Hiro, 1937
- Microlepadidae Hoek, 1907
- Oxynaspididae
- Poecilasmatidae Annandale, 1909
- †Priscansermarinidae Newman, 2004
- Rhizolepadidae Zevina, 1980
