= Oxynaspis gracilis =

Scientific classification
- Kingdom: Animalia
- Phylum: Arthropoda
- Clade: Pancrustacea
- Class: Thecostraca
- Subclass: Cirripedia
- Order: Scalpellomorpha
- Family: Poecilasmatidae
- Genus: Oxynaspis
- Species: O. gracilis

Binomial name
- Oxynaspis gracilis Totton, 1940

Species of barnacle

Oxynaspis gracilis is a species of goose barnacle in the family Oxynaspididae, commonly known as the black coral barnacle because it is normally found attached to black coral. The type specimen was found in Réunion in the East Indies.

== Description ==
Oxynaspis gracilis is a small stalked barnacle some 2 to 5 mm (0.1 to 0.2 in) in length. The coenosarc (living tissue) of the host coral sometimes grows over the surface of the barnacle. The scutum and carina are separate and the square base of the scutum has the umbo in the middle and set close to the occluded edge.

== Ecology ==
Observations of a number of these barnacles growing on the black coral Antipathes atlantica and all orienting themselves in one direction against the water current, with their cirri forming a cup-like shape, indicate that the barnacles were actively engaged in intercepting and feeding on plankton. The living tissue of black corals such as Plumapathes pennacea may grow over the surface of this barnacle.

Black corals are mostly deep water animals; specimens (including fan-shaped and bottlebrush-shaped species) from the Gulf of Mexico, collected and recorded with remotely operated vehicles at depths ranging from 68 to 124 m (223 to 407 ft), revealed O. gracilis growing on six different species. Other animals sharing the black coral habitat included squat lobsters (Uroptychus sp.), shrimps, and the winged oyster Pteria colymbus.
