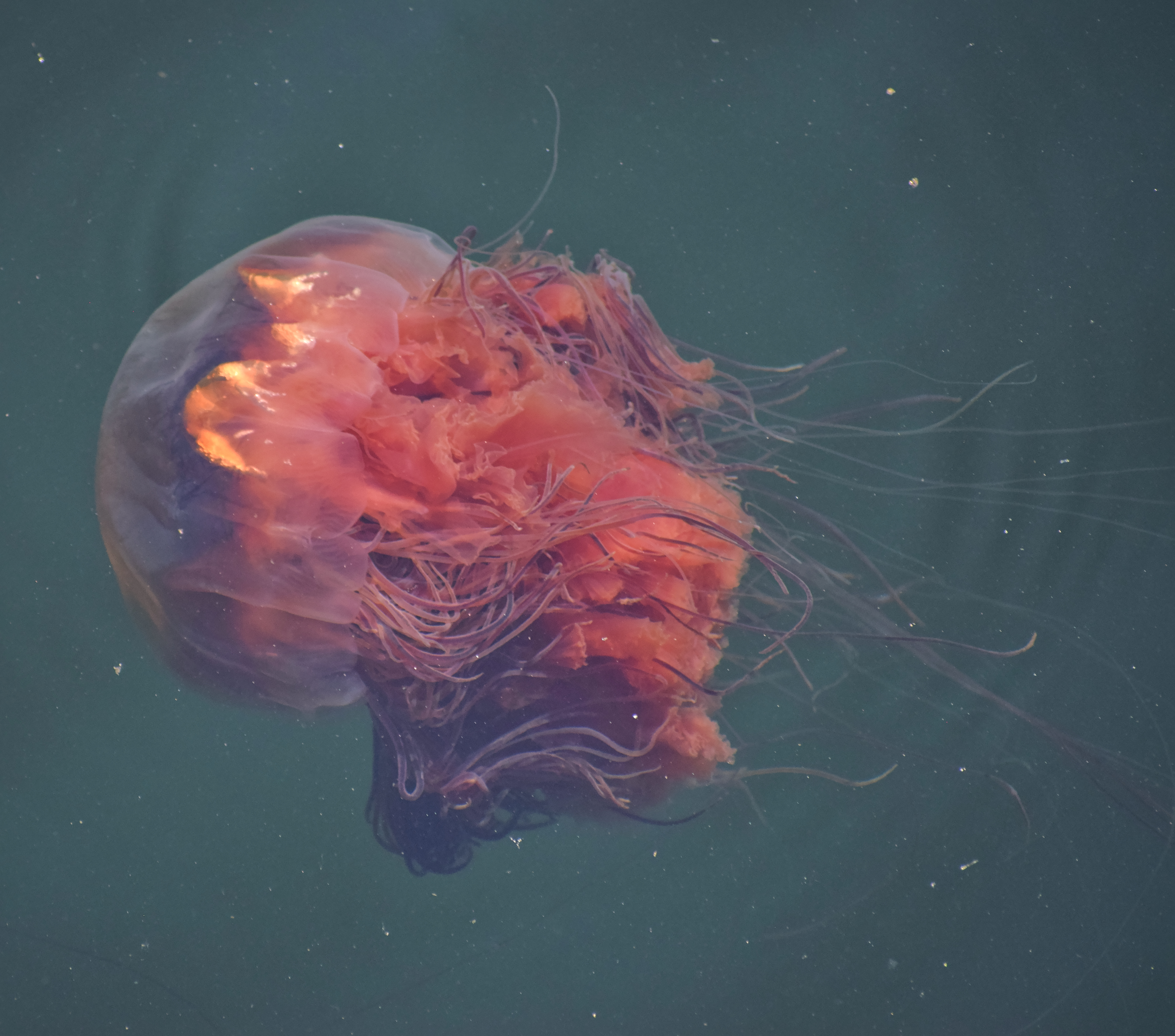
- Observed at Burrard Inlet.

Scientific classification
- Kingdom: Animalia
- Phylum: Cnidaria
- Class: Scyphozoa
- Order: Semaeostomeae
- Family: Cyaneidae
- Genus: Cyanea
- Species: C. ferruginea

Binomial name
- Cyanea ferruginea Eschscholtz, 1829
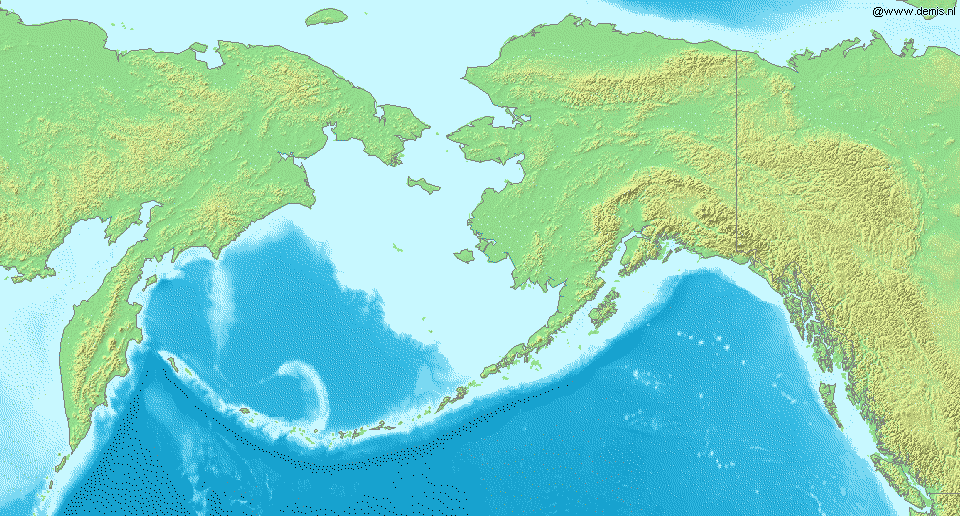
- Map of the Bering Sea where Cyanea ferruginea is distributed

= Cyanea ferruginea =

Species of jellyfish

Cyanea ferruginea, also known as the Pacific lion mane jellyfish, is a species of jellyfish commonly found south of the polar region and the Bering Sea.

It is smaller than the similar species Cyanea capillata (lion's mane jellyfish), one of the largest animals in the ocean. Its bell is red and has a diameter of about 1 meters with tentacles extending up to 8 meters.
