= Alepas pacifica =

Scientific classification
- Kingdom: Animalia
- Phylum: Arthropoda
- Clade: Pancrustacea
- Class: Thecostraca
- Subclass: Cirripedia
- Order: Scalpellomorpha
- Family: Heteralepadidae
- Genus: Alepas
- Species: A. pacifica

Binomial name
- Alepas pacifica Pilsbry, 1907

Synonyms
- Alepas investigator Annandale, 1914

Species of barnacle

Alepas pacifica is a species of goose barnacle in the family Heteralepadidae. It is a pelagic species and is an obligate associate of various species of jellyfish. It mainly occurs in the Pacific Ocean.

== Description ==
Alepas pacifica is a whitish, translucent species of stalked barnacle. Its plates are lightweight, only partially calcified and much reduced in size.

== Distribution ==
Alepas pacifica is found in tropical and subtropical waters in the Indian Ocean and the Pacific Ocean, its range extending from Australia and Malaysia to China, Japan and the western coast of North America. It is also known from the Atlantic Ocean.

== Ecology ==
Alepas pacifica lives in association with a jellyfish such as the ghost jellyfish Cyanea nozakii. In this association it hangs from the margin of the bell. It is a similar colour to the whitish jellyfish, which makes it inconspicuous. It is a permanent resident, always associating with a jellyfish, and making use of the rich food supply in the surface waters in which the jellyfish floats.

Other jellyfish which this barnacle uses as a host include Nomura's jellyfish (Nemopilema nomurai), the egg-yolk jellyfish (Phacellophora camtschatica), the purple-stripe jellyfish (Chrysaora colorata), and several other scyphozoan species. In the case of the egg-yolk jellyfish, a group of barnacles may be attached to the outside of the domed top of the bell, looking rather like an article of headwear. It is not apparent that the jellyfish is disadvantaged by the presence of the barnacle.

Although normally a direct symbiont of jellyfish, this barnacle has been found attached to another barnacle of its own species which was itself attached to a jellyfish. These indirectly attached individuals were small and had longer penes than their directly attached counterparts, and may have acted as dwarf males.
