= Cyanea =

Cyanea may refer to:

- Cyanea (cnidarian), a genus of jellyfish in the family Cyaneidae
- Cyanea (plant), a genus of Hawaiian plants in the family Campanulaceae
- Cyanea, a Naiad
- Cyanea, a species name

== See also ==
- Including use as a species name
