= Snotties =

Snotties may refer to:

- Snottites: a colony of single-celled organisms resembling soft stalactites, found in caves
- A Royal Navy slang term for Midshipmen
- Snotties (TV series), a 2006 New Zealand reality television program
- Cyanea barkeri jellyfish
