= Koleolepadidae =

Family of barnacles

In the past, Koleolepadidae was considered a family of barnacles with a single genus, Koleolepas. Research published in 2021 by Chan et al. resulted in Koleolepas being moved to the family Heteralepadidae. The family Koleolepadidae is no longer active.

== See also ==
- Heteralepadidae for the family containing former members of Koleolepadidae.
- List of Cirripedia genera for a list of barnacle families and genera.
