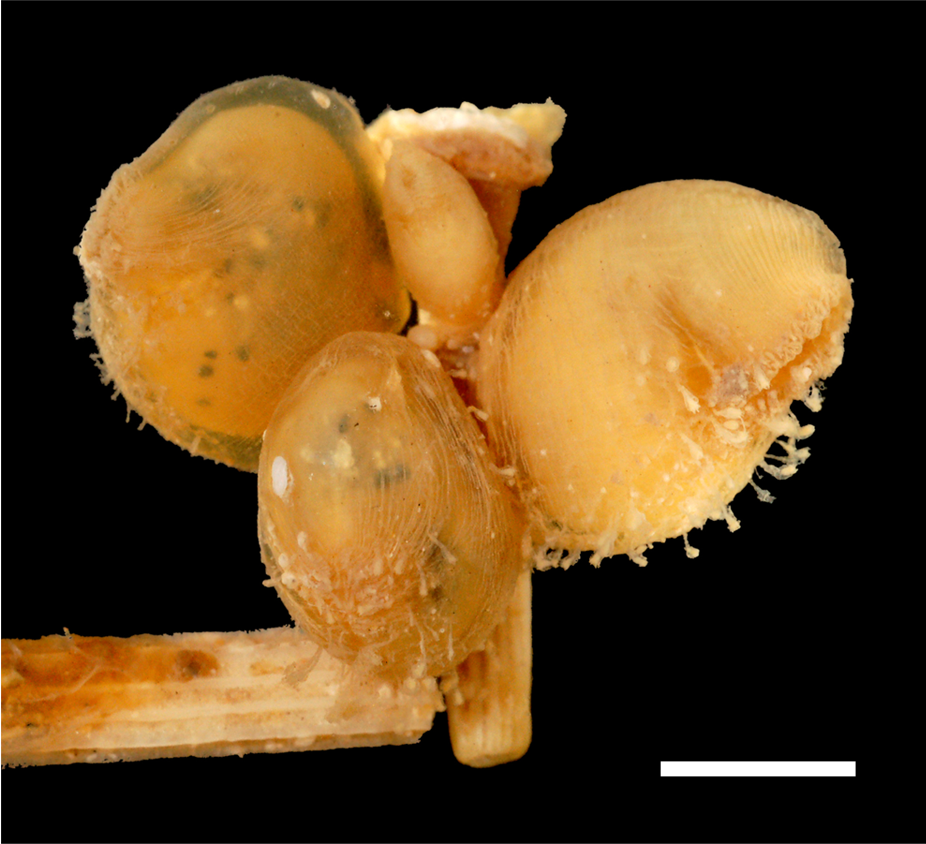
- Several P. minuta attached to the spine of a sea urchin

Scientific classification
- Domain: Eukaryota
- Kingdom: Animalia
- Phylum: Arthropoda
- Class: Thecostraca
- Subclass: Cirripedia
- Order: Scalpellomorpha
- Family: Heteralepadidae
- Genus: Paralepas
- Species: P. minuta

Binomial name
- Paralepas minuta Philippi, 1836

Synonyms
- Alepas minuta Philippi, 1836; Heteralepas minuta (Philippi, 1836)

= Paralepas minuta =

Species of barnacle

Paralepas minuta is a species of goose barnacle in the family Heteralepadidae.

== Description ==
P. minuta is a small stalked barnacle, its body reaching lengths of no more than 5 mm and widths of about 3.8 mm. The body is roughly globular and does not bear valves; it is slightly wrinkled and yellow in colour. The stalk (peduncle) is very short (about 1 mm) and heavily contracted. The base is usually divided into two finger-like projections that grip its anchoring substrate. It has repeatedly been found attached to the spines of deep-water sea urchins.

== Distribution ==
The species has a wide distribution and occurs in the Mediterranean and off West and South Africa, Japan, the Philippines, and Australia, at depths of 110–414 m.
