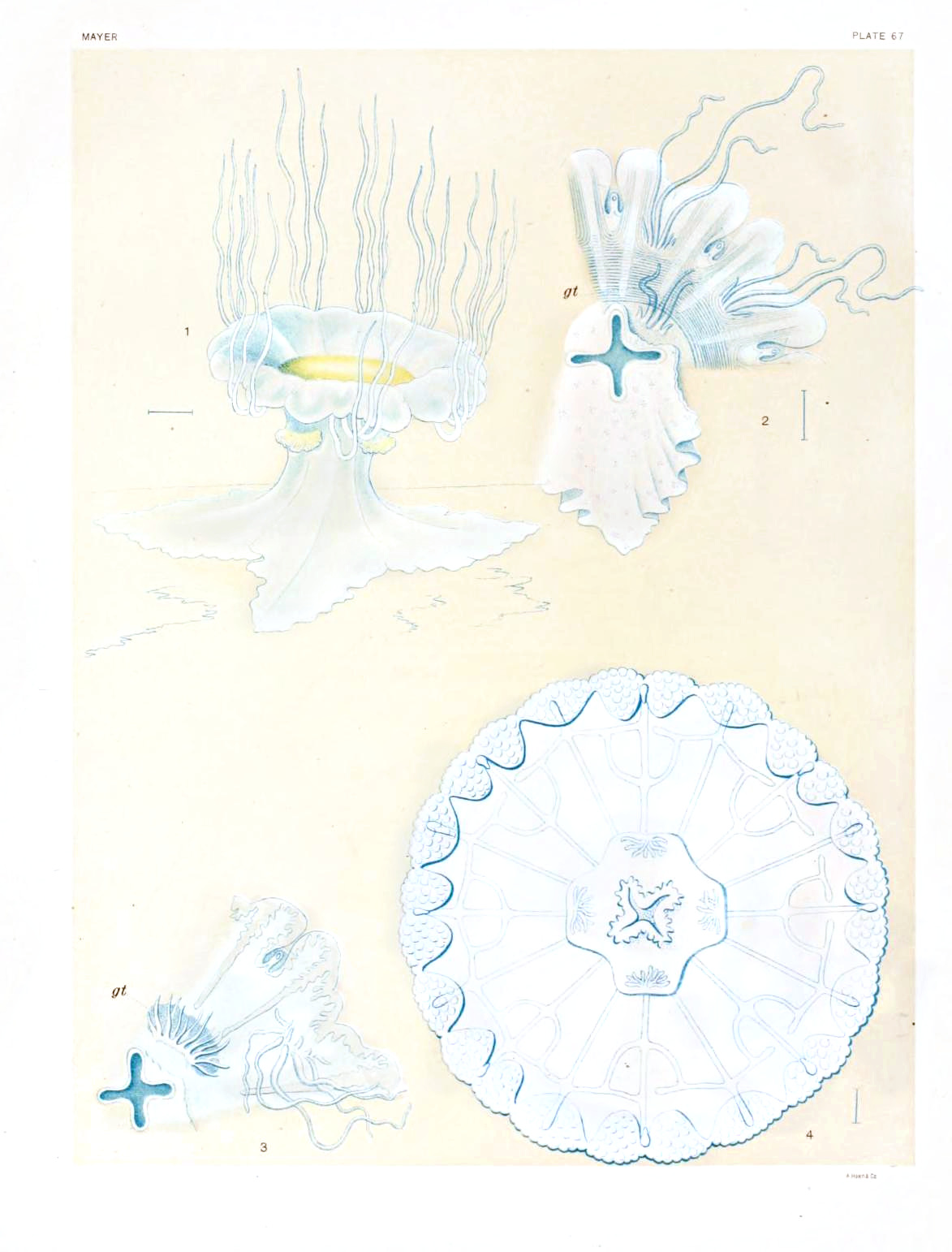
- The anatomy of life cycle growth stages in Cyanea fulva populations

Scientific classification
- Kingdom: Animalia
- Phylum: Cnidaria
- Class: Scyphozoa
- Order: Semaeostomeae
- Family: Cyaneidae
- Genus: Cyanea
- Species: C. fulva

Binomial name
- Cyanea fulva Agassiz, 1862

= Cyanea fulva =

Species of jellyfish

Cyanea fulva, the Atlantic lion's mane jellyfish, is a species of jellyfish found along the Mid-Atlantic coastal region of the United States. C. fulva are commonly noted as being about two inches in diameter and smaller than C. capillata, however, larger than C. versicolor, a co-occurring close species. One distinctive feature present in mature C. fulva populations is their four mouth-part tentacles, containing a cinnamon color with the center of the main cavity being darker. At a young age, these jellyfish can have three appendages but often gain a fourth at more developed life cycle stages. C. fulva are also known for having less folds compared to C. arctica but more folds compared to C. versicolor. These folds are described as being remarkably thin and deciduous.

Their distribution is commonly associated with regions south of Cape Cod and in the Long Island Sound. C. fulva demonstrate a peak in their population during the middle of summer and populations are typically found in shallower water. Likewise, cyanea polyps have a decreased chance of survival in ocean temperatures over 25°C. Their sting is generally considered only moderately painful to humans. The free amino acid composition (FAA) of C. fulva is also known to have a more uniform distribution throughout the spectrum of its composition compared to Aurelia aurita and Chrysaora quinquecirrha scyphozoan polyps. One study found that Cyanea populations have the greatest variety of nematocyst types such as a-isorhizas, A-isorhizas, 𝛼-isorhizas, heterotrichous anisorhizas, and heterotrichous microbasic euryteles. The euryteles were found to have a larger average length compared to Aurelia aurita, Chrysaora quinquecirrha, and Rhopilema verrilli populations.

Their representation is often classified as a variety of C. capillata. Although its distribution is more local, the general appearance and habits of C. fulva is very similarly aligned with C. capillata. In fact, this species may soon be called the "little brown brother" of the more widely known C. capillata var. arctica.

== Description ==
Cyanea fulva are known as measuring over two inches in diameter. They are often larger than C. versicolor populations but have a smaller maximum size than C. capillata populations. Their genital pouches are stretched in the same plane as the lower floor. At a young age, the four corners of the mouth become prolonged as independent, distinct, arm-like appendages. In young C. fulva populations, there are only three tentacles to each bunch. These tentacles first appear in clefts between lappets and the margins grow outward. However, mature C. fulva populations have four tentacles projecting from broad clusters in each bunch, hung beyond the actinostome. These tentacles have a general tinge of cinnamon color, are darker in the center of the main cavity, and are much lighter along the margin of the disk. The lobes of the margin are more rounded and deeper than other Cyanea populations. Cyanea disks are also larger than Aurelia disks. The stomach-cavity is represented by a pale-yellow colored ephyra.

Cyanea fulva are known for having less folds compared to C. arctica populations, but more folds compared to C. versicolor populations. These folds are remarkably thin and deciduous. The areas of the concentric folds are comparatively broadest, and the radiating folds are the shortest compared to other Cyanea species. These jellyfish also have exumbrellar papillae unlike C. capillata. The larvae are retained on the parent in the cysts and the characteristics of the family include development through the sessile scyphistoma which strobilates and gives off ephyrae, eventually developing into medusae.

== Distribution ==
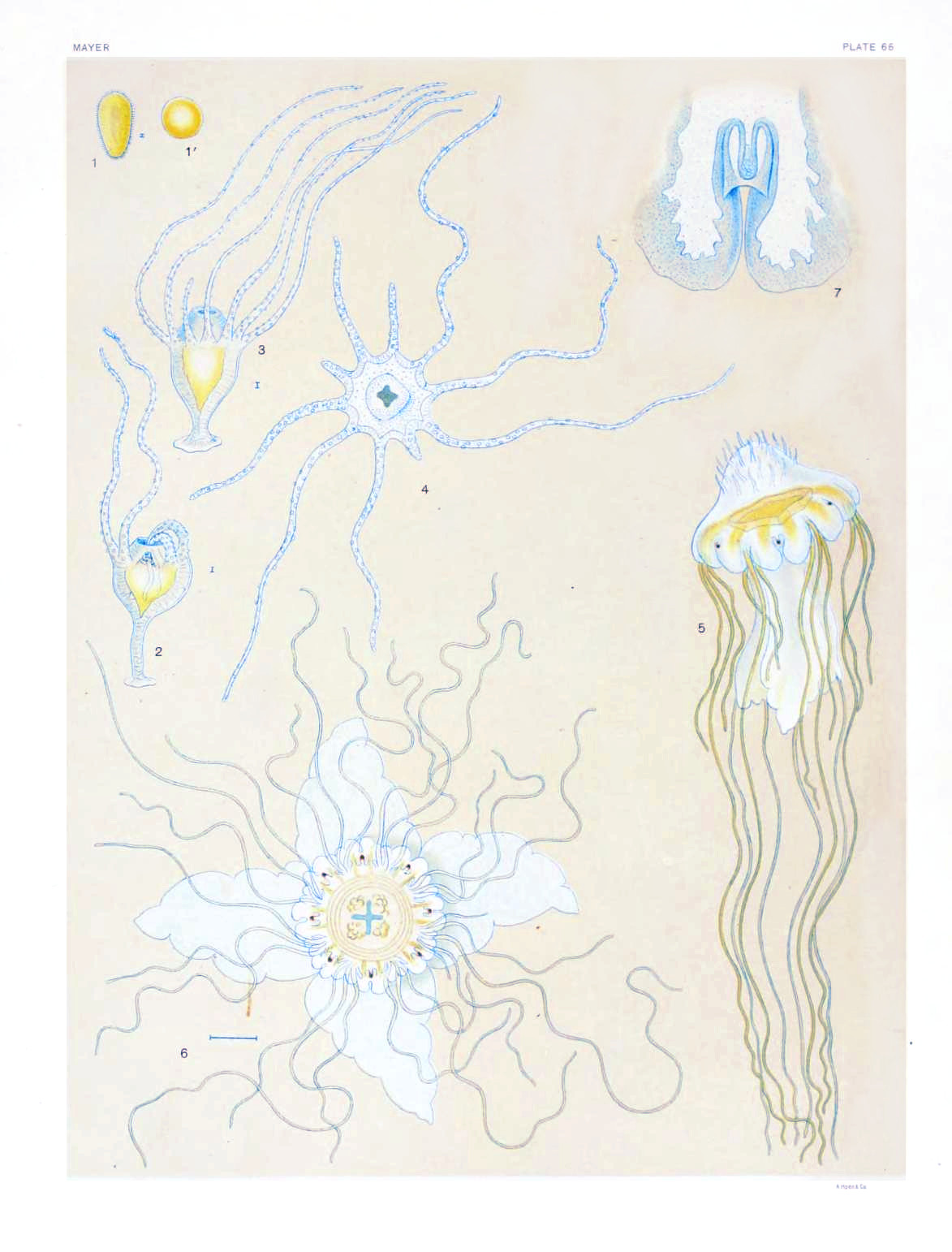
Various life cycle growth stage angles of Cyanea fulva populations.

Their distribution differs with latitude but C. fulva populations are particularly common south of Cape Cod and in the Long Island Sound. L. Agassiz (1862) also determined that these populations are found in the same region: the western Atlantic along the mid-Atlantic states. C. fulva demonstrate their population peak in midsummer. In Hempstead Harbor, they regularly appear in the middle of May each year. C. fulva populations are also typically found in shallower water.

== Ecology ==
One study tested the responses of aquatic invertebrates such as the jellyfish C. fulva to declining oxygen conditions. Their population were acclimated to several different temperatures: 5, 10, and 15 °C. Another study concluded that Cyanea polyps struggle to survive above 25 °C. Their sting is generally considered moderately painful to humans. C. fulva free amino acid composition (FAA) was shown to have a more uniform distribution throughout the spectrum of composition as compared to Aurelia aurita and Chrysaora quinquecirrha scyphozoan polyps.

In a separate study, Cyanea was found to have the greatest variety of nematocyst types such as a-isorhizas, A-isorhizas, 𝛼-isorhizas, heterotrichous anisorhizas, and heterotrichous microbasic euryteles. The study concluded that there were marked differences in the relative abundance of 𝛼-isorhizas from one ephyra of Cyanea to another. The 𝛼-isorhizas were found to be concentrated in the oral region of the scyphistoma and did not become equally distributed among the ephyrae produced by the given strobila. The euryteles were found to have a larger average length of 10.1-12.7μm compared to Aurelia aurita, Chrysaora quinquecirrha, and Rhopilema verrilli populations. A difference in size and distribution between morphologically identical nematocysts of Cyanea capillata and Cyanea lamarckii was also observed.

== Classification ==
Their representation is often classified as a variety of C. capillata. Originally, Stiasny (1919) believed that species such as C. fulva served as color variants of C. capillata for nearly a century. Later, Stiasny & van der Maaden (1943) concluded that C. fulva populations should be considered incertae sedis. Kramp (1961) later synonymized Cyanea fulva to Cyanea capillata.
