= Microlepadidae =

Family of crustaceans

In the past, Microlepadidae has been considered a family of barnacles. Research published in 2021 by Chan et al. resulted in the genera of Microlepadidae being merged with that of Poecilasmatidae, which now contains the members of both families.

== See also ==
- Poecilasmatidae for the family containing former members of Microlepadidae.
- List of Cirripedia genera for a list of barnacle families and genera.
