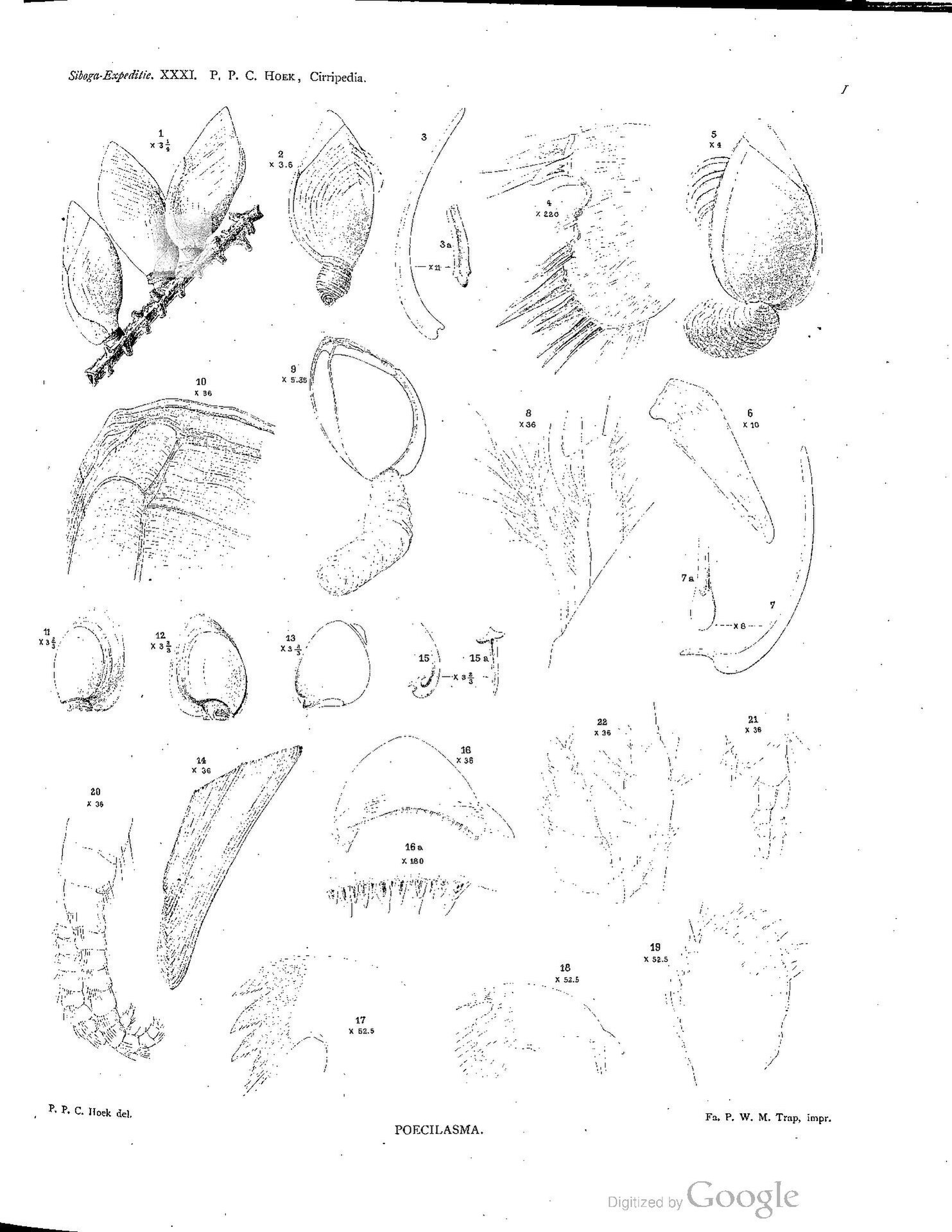
- Illustrations of anatomical features of Microlepas diademae (figs. 8-16) alongside Poecilasma spp.

Scientific classification
- Kingdom: Animalia
- Phylum: Arthropoda
- Class: Thecostraca
- Subclass: Cirripedia
- Order: Scalpellomorpha
- Family: Poecilasmatidae
- Genus: Microlepas; Hoek, 1907

Type species
- M. diademae Hoek, 1907

Species
- Microlepas diademae Hoek, 1907; Microlepas echinotrichae Grygier & Newman, 1991

= Microlepas =

Genus of barnacles

Microlepas is a genus of goose barnacles found in the Pacific Ocean, first described by Paulus Peronius Cato Hoek in 1907 with the sole species of Microlepas diademae found off the coast of Sumba. The genus remained monotypic until the description of Microlepas echinotrichae in 1991.

== Ecology ==
Microlepas species are parasitoids of sea urchins of the species Diadema setosum. Barnacles of this genus cause inhibited growth in the spine they rest upon; and while their feeding methods are unknown, it is suspected that the barnacles consume tissues from their host, as the barnacles are known to cause deleterious health effects to the urchins they rest on.
