= Anelasmatidae =

Family of crustaceans

In the past, Anelasmatidae has been considered a family of barnacles of the order Lepadiformes. Research published in 2021 by Chan et al. resulted in the sole genus of this family, Anelasma, being moved to the family Pollicipedidae, and this family is no longer used.
