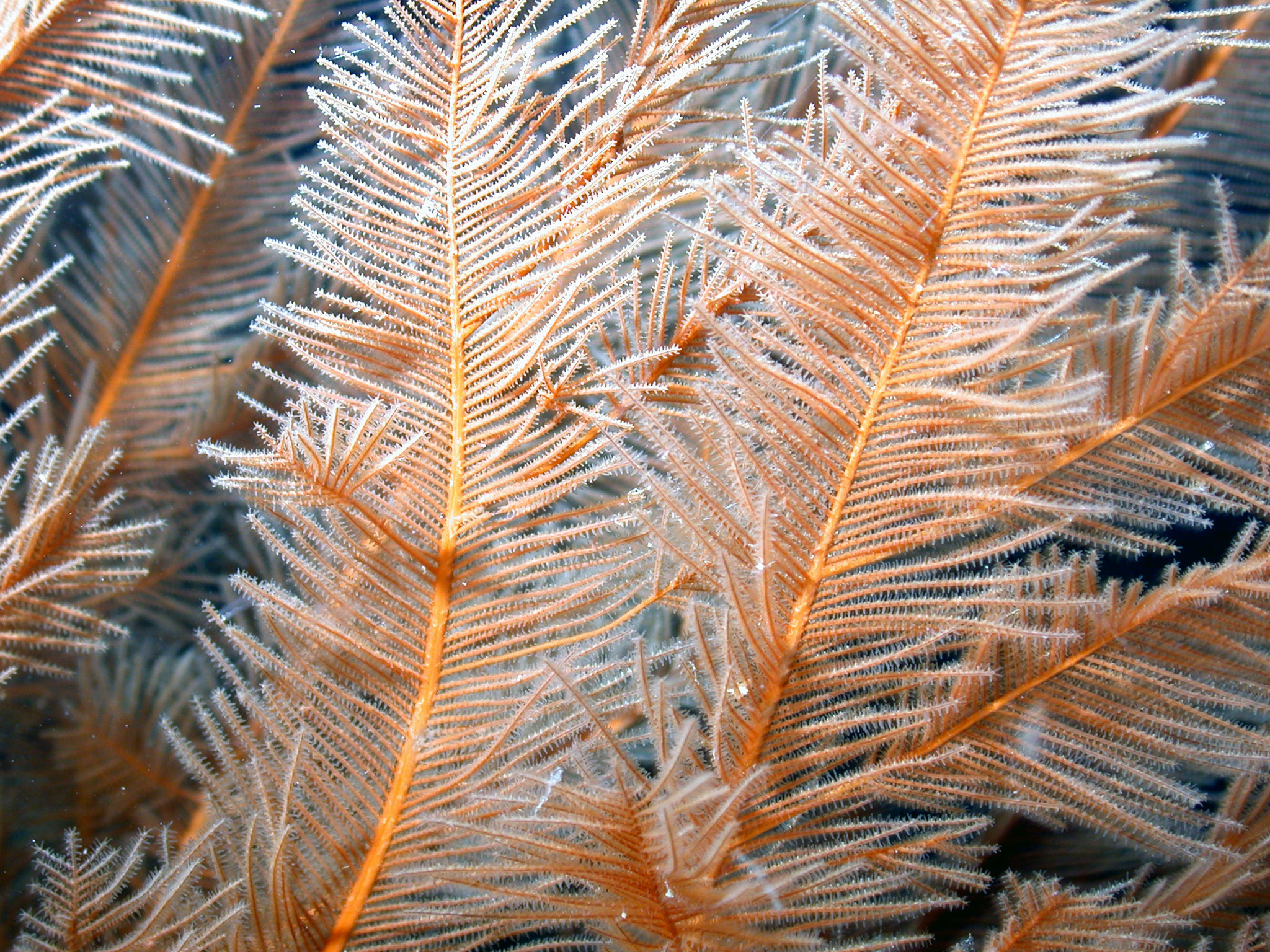

Conservation status
- Vulnerable (NatureServe)

Scientific classification
- Kingdom: Animalia
- Phylum: Cnidaria
- Subphylum: Anthozoa
- Class: Hexacorallia
- Order: Antipatharia
- Family: Myriopathidae
- Genus: Plumapathes
- Species: P. pennacea

Binomial name
- Plumapathes pennacea (Pallas, 1766)

Synonyms
- Antipathes pennacea Pallas, 1766

= Plumapathes pennacea =

Species of coral

Plumapathes pennacea is a species of black coral in the order Antipatharia. It is found in the tropical Indian, Pacific and Atlantic Oceans in deep reef habitats where it forms part of a biologically diverse community.

== Description ==
Black corals are so called because the main axial skeleton is made of a spiny, keratin-like substance called "antipathin" which is a dark brownish-black. This colonial coral has a bushy, two dimensional form and grows out of a holdfast firmly anchored to a rock. It can grow to 1.5 m (5 ft) tall and a similar width. The slender branches fork at intervals and divide pinnately, and the smallest pinnules are a few centimetres long and close together, forming a feather-like effect. The polyps are golden brown, brown or blackish, the ones on the pinnules being paler in colour; they may make the axis appear dark red. The size and shape of the polyps vary across the colony, with the polyps most distant from the holdfast being more elongate than the others. Each polyp has six, non-retractile, unbranched tentacles.

== Distribution and habitat ==
Plumapathes pennacea is found in tropical parts of the Indian, Pacific and Atlantic Oceans; it occurs as deep as 330 m (1,100 ft) but is most common between 25 and 60 m (80 and 200 ft), and even shallower than this in caves and under dark overhangs. It is present in the Caribbean Sea, the Bahamas and southern Florida, but not in Bermuda.

== Ecology ==
A number of other organisms live on this coral or are associated with it. Algae, hydroids and bryozoans settle and grow on the branches, and several species of shrimps, stalked barnacles, molluscs and fish are associated with it, many as symbionts with some hiding among the branches, and others feeding on the polyps. The living tissue of the coral may grow over the surface of the black coral barnacle (Oxynaspis gracilis). Growth rates of black corals are low and this coral lives for thirty or more years.
