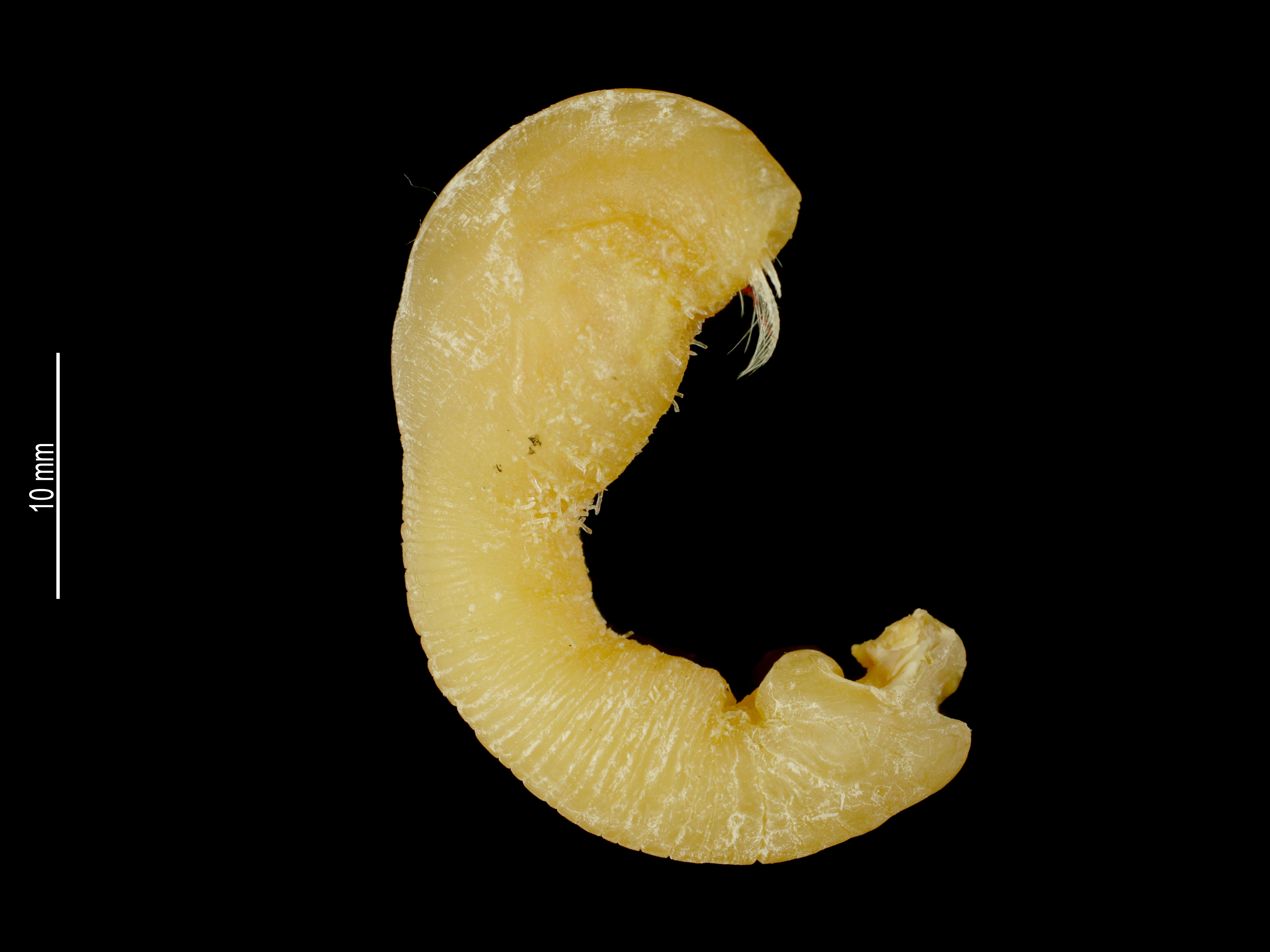
- Heteralepas microstoma

Scientific classification
- Kingdom: Animalia
- Phylum: Arthropoda
- Clade: Pancrustacea
- Class: Thecostraca
- Subclass: Cirripedia
- Superorder: Thoracicalcarea
- Order: Scalpellomorpha
- Superfamily: Lepadoidea
- Family: Heteralepadidae
- Genus: Heteralepas; Pilsbry, 1907

= Heteralepas =

Genus of barnacles

Heteralepas is a genus of goose barnacles in the family Heteralepadidae. which was first described in 1907 by Henry Augustus Pilsbry.

== Species ==
The World Register of Marine Species includes the following species in the genus :

- Heteralepas adiposa Zevina, 1982
- Heteralepas belli (Gruvel, 1902)
- Heteralepas canci Chan, Tsang & Shih, 2012
- Heteralepas cantelli Buhl-Mortensen & Newman, 2004
- Heteralepas cornuta (Darwin, 1851)
- Heteralepas cygnus Pilsbry, 1907
- Heteralepas fulva Zevina, 1982
- Heteralepas gettysburgensis Lobo & Tuaty-Guerra, 2017
- Heteralepas gigas (Annandale, 1905)
- Heteralepas hataii Zevina, 1982
- Heteralepas indica Gruvel,
- Heteralepas japonica (Aurivillius, 1892)
- Heteralepas lankesteri (Gruvel, 1900)
- Heteralepas luridas Zevina, 1982
- Heteralepas microstoma (Gruvel, 1901)
- Heteralepas mystacophora Newman, 1964
- Heteralepas newmani Buhl-Mortensen & Mifsud, 2017
- Heteralepas nicobarica Annandale, 1909
- Heteralepas ovalis (Hoek, 1907)
- Heteralepas rex (Pilsbry, 1907)
- Heteralepas segonzaci Young, 2001
- Heteralepas smilius Ren, 1983
- Heteralepas tenuis (Hoek, 1907)
- Heteralepas utinomii Newman, 1960
- Heteralepas vetula Pilsbry, 1909
