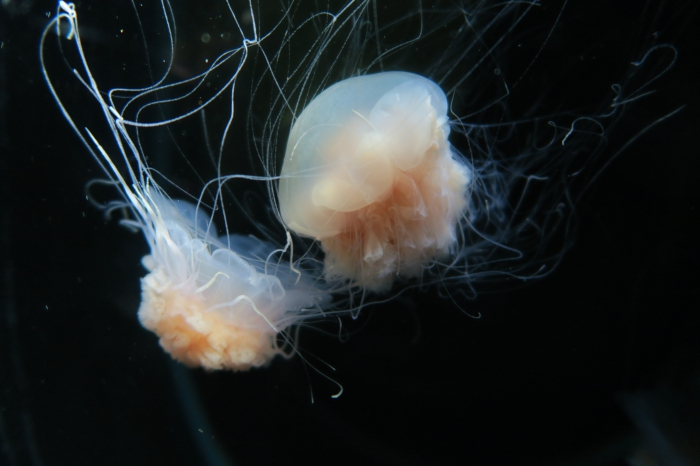
- 2 eight bulbed semi-transparent white jellyfish

Scientific classification
- Kingdom: Animalia
- Phylum: Cnidaria
- Class: Scyphozoa
- Order: Semaeostomeae
- Family: Cyaneidae
- Genus: Cyanea
- Species: C. nozakii

Binomial name
- Cyanea nozakii Kishinouye, 1891

Synonyms
- Cyanea nozaki Kishinouye, 1891

= Cyanea nozakii =

Species of jellyfish

Cyanea nozakii or Cyanea nozaki (misspelling), commonly known as the ghost jellyfish, is a species of jellyfish found in the northern Pacific Ocean near the coasts of China and Japan. Along with other species of large jellyfish, it is showing a greater tendency to appear in large numbers and cause blooms.

== Description ==
The medusa stage of Cyanea nozakii has a distinctive flat-topped bell which can grow to a diameter of 50 centimetres (20 in). The bell is usually cream or pale yellow in colour with a dark centre and a translucent rim. It has eight large marginal lobes and eight bundles of thread-like marginal tentacles. There may be a hundred or more tentacles in each bundle which are either translucent or a reddish colour, and can extend for 10 metres (33 ft). Under the centre of the bell is the manubrium, the mouth being surrounded by a tangled mass of rusty-brown or orange oral tentacles.

== Distribution ==
Cyanea nozakii is found around the coasts of China and Japan. Since the beginning of this century, Cyanea nozakii has become more common, with mass aggregations occurring. In 2004 this happened in Liaodong Bay in Northeast China and it was noticed that commercial catches of the edible jellyfish Rhopilema esculentum were adversely affected.

In 2011, a bloom of large jellyfish appeared off the coast of Qingdao, in what a Japanese scientist had said would be a "non-jellyfish year". These jellyfish largely consisted of Nemopilema nomurai, Aurelia aurita and Cyanea nozakii, and the Institute of Oceanology, Chinese Academy of Sciences is undertaking research into how such blooms develop and their social and ecological effects. Reporting in 2014, the study found that the blooms were likely to be an indicator of worsening ecosystem health. They are linked to variations in sea temperature, increased pollution of coastal waters, overfishing by China, bottom trawling, and the depletion of oxygen levels due to algal blooms. These factors are favouring the survival of the polyp stage of the jellyfish life cycle and thus contributing to greater numbers of the jellyfish medusae.

== Ecology ==
A number of species of juvenile fish associate with this jellyfish, making use of the protection provided by its stinging tentacles. The razorbelly scad (Alepes kleinii) and Malabar trevally (Carangoides malabaricus) are two such fish; large numbers of tiny fish congregate around and among the fine tentacles. Each fish either avoids touching the tentacles or is relatively unaffected by their mild sting, and if the jellyfish is netted, the little fish stay with it and may get more heavily stung, and consequently die. As they get larger, the fish leave the jellyfish and live independently.

Another organism that lives in association with the jellyfish is the stalked barnacle Alepas pacifica which hangs from the margin of the bell. It is translucent and a similar whitish colour to the jellyfish which makes it inconspicuous. It is a permanent resident, always associating with the jellyfish, and makes use of the rich food supply in the surface waters in which the jellyfish floats.

== Research ==
A collagen peptide, shown to have immune-enhancing activity, has been extracted from Cyanea nozakii. A patent for this product has been applied for.
