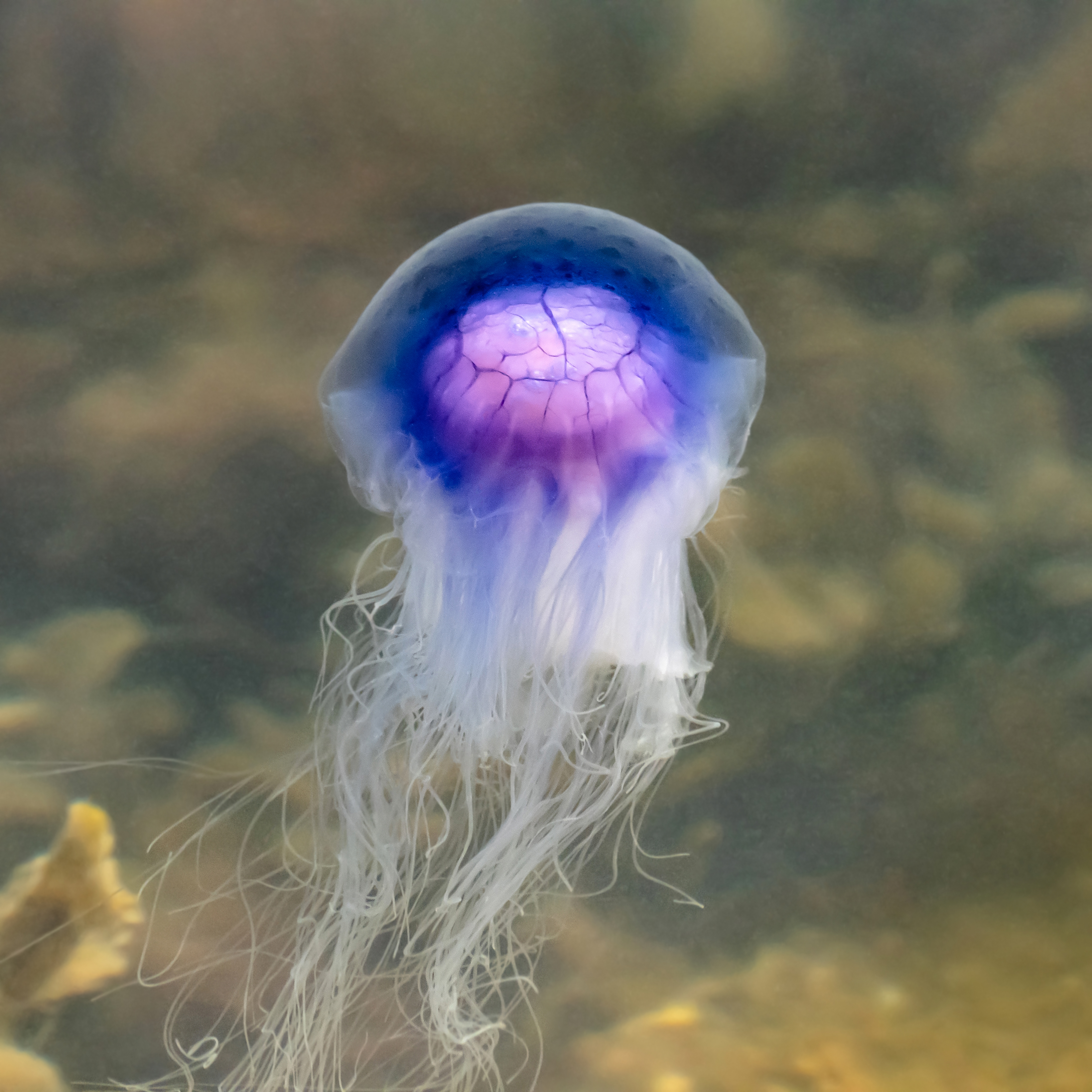
- Bluefire jellyfish in Brofjorden, Sweden

Scientific classification
- Kingdom: Animalia
- Phylum: Cnidaria
- Class: Scyphozoa
- Order: Semaeostomeae
- Family: Cyaneidae
- Genus: Cyanea
- Species: C. lamarckii

Binomial name
- Cyanea lamarckii Péron & Lesueur, 1810

= Blue jellyfish =

Species of jellyfish

The blue jellyfish (Cyanea lamarckii), also known as the bluefire jellyfish, is a species of jellyfish in the family Cyaneidae.

== Description ==
Blue jellyfish age can be identified by colour of their bell. They tend to be pale in appearance when young, but mature to have a brightly purple-blue (some yellow) coloured bell. Although it is similar to the lion's mane jellyfish, the blue jellyfish is not as large, and has a translucent bell.

C. lamarckii has a blue or yellow tone and grows to approximately 10 to 20 cm (4 to 8 in) across the bell, but specimens can grow to 30 cm (12 in). In Scandinavian seas, this species rarely grows larger than 15 cm (6 in).

These jellyfish drift closer to the shore to catch the large abundance of plankton with their tentacles. This jellyfish has many stinging tentacles. The four mouth arms are large with many wrinkles and ripples. The jellyfish live off a diet of phytoplankton or zooplankton as well as the eggs and larvae of other aquatic animals such as fish. Cyanea lamarkii use their tentacles containing nematocysts to not only catch their prey, but to protect from predators.

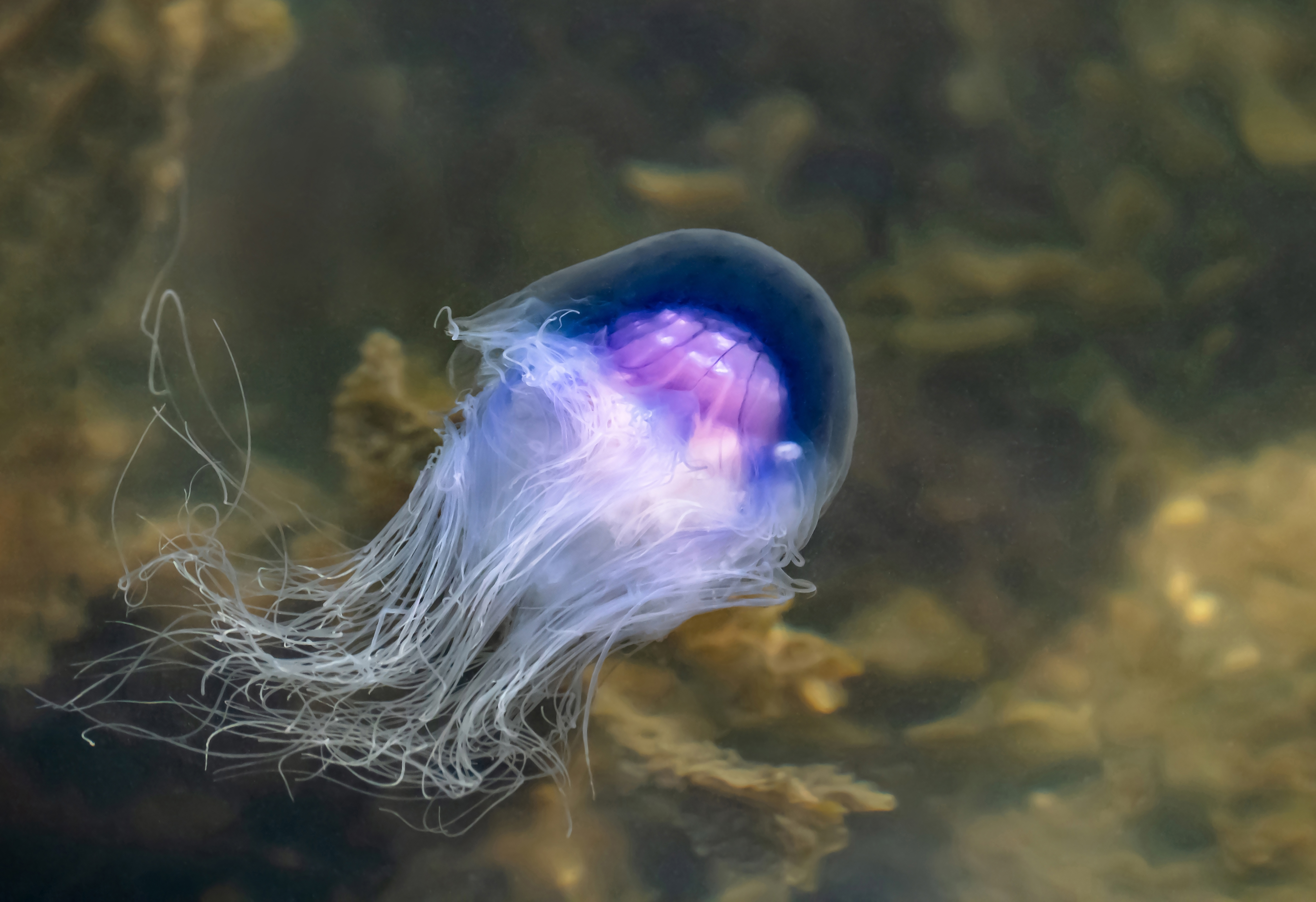
Sideview

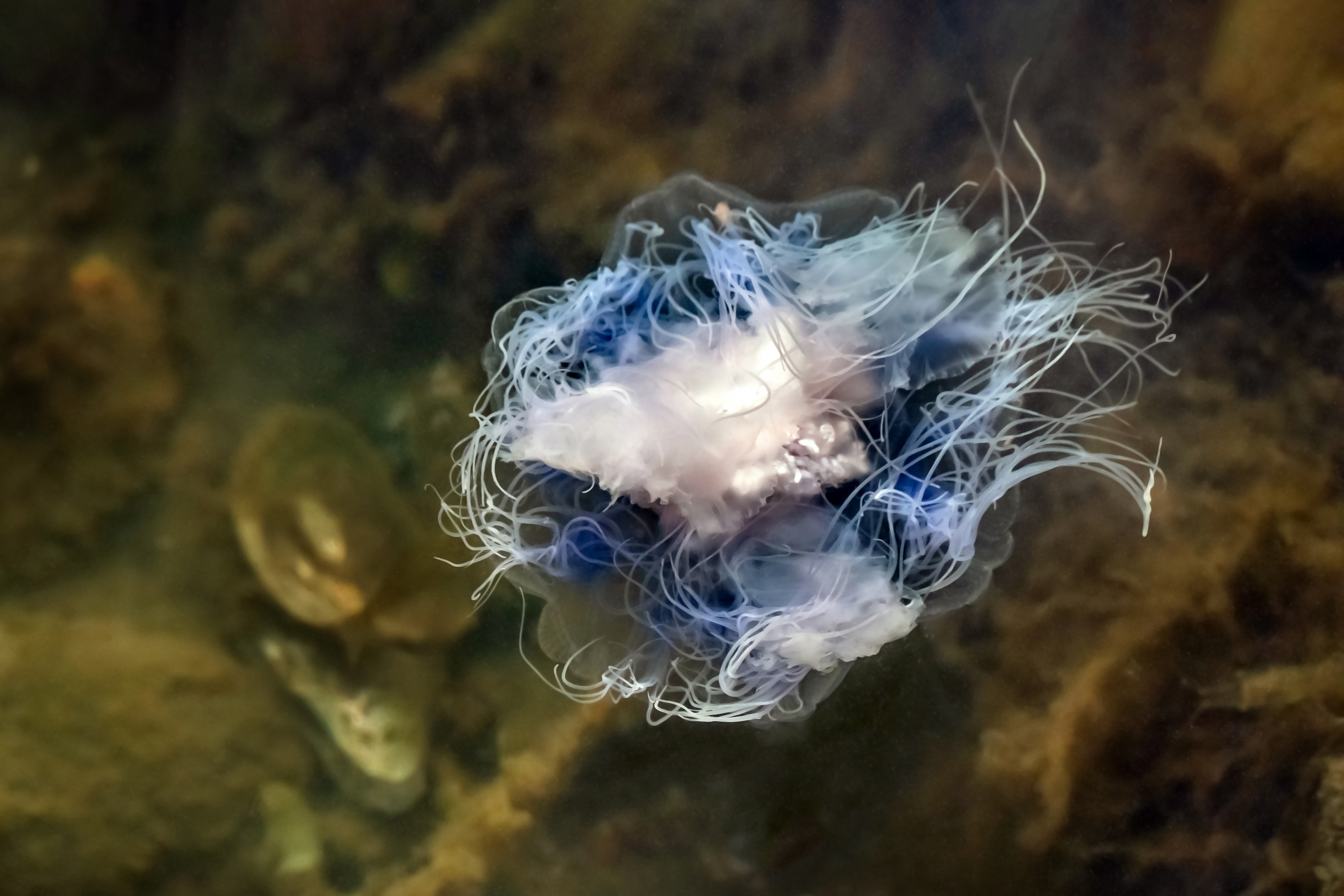
Underside

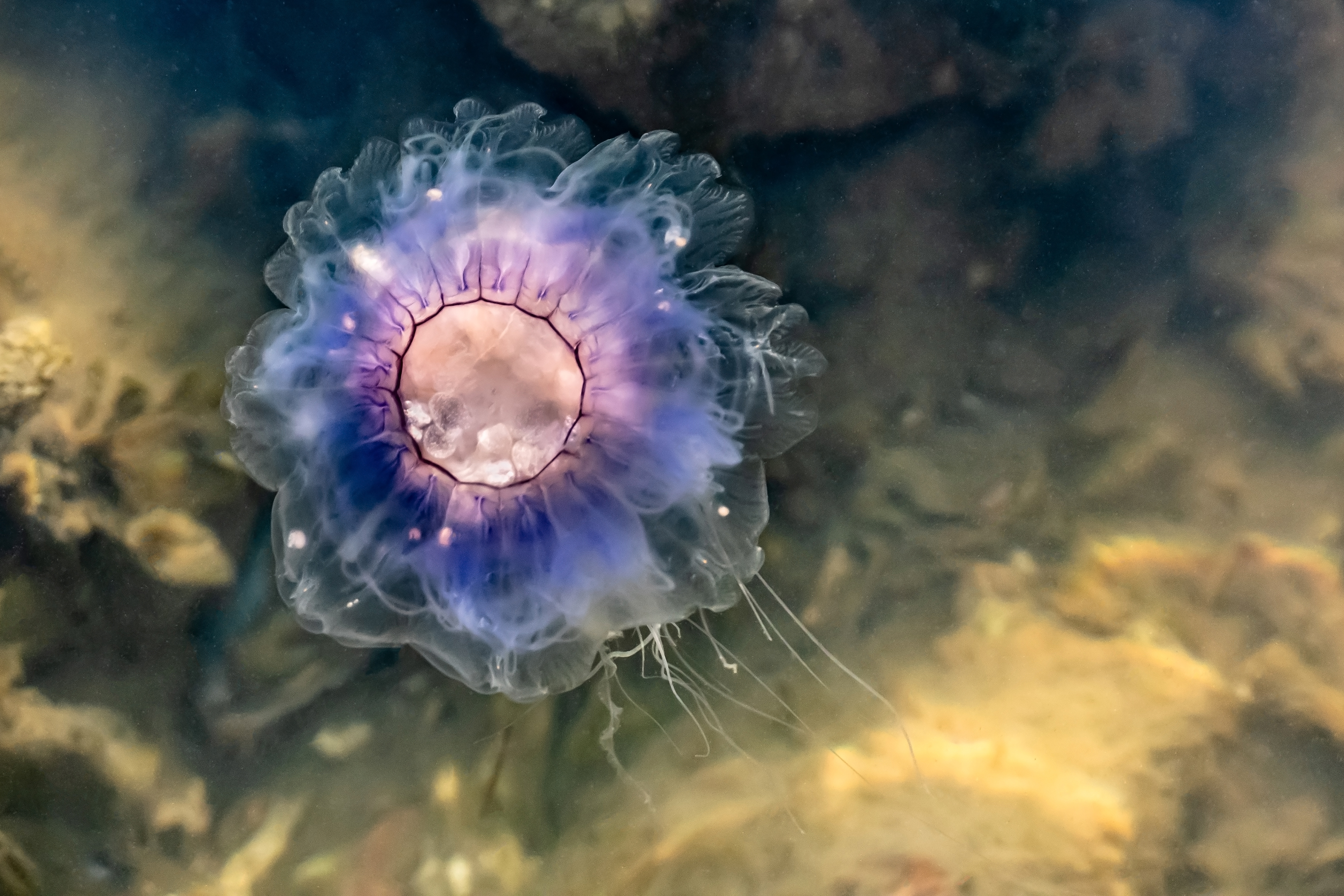
Expanding

Beached

== Distribution ==
This species is found in the pelagic zone off the west coast of Scotland, the North Sea, the English Channel, and the Irish Sea, sometimes with the more common lion's mane jellyfish (Cyanea capillata). It is also found in the Kattegat along the Swedish western coast as well as in Danish waters.

== Taxonomy ==
The taxonomy of Cyanea species is not fully agreed upon. Some zoologists have suggested that all species within the genus should be treated as one. However, Cyanea lamarckii exists with two other distinct taxa in at least the eastern North Atlantic.

The species specifier originates from the French naturalist Lamarck (Latin name form: Lamarckius).

== Life cycle ==
The medusae bud and loosen from the mature polyps between January and March around the British Isles and southern North Sea. This occurs in a similar way to the life cycle of the moon jellyfish. These blue jellyfish live for less than a year.
