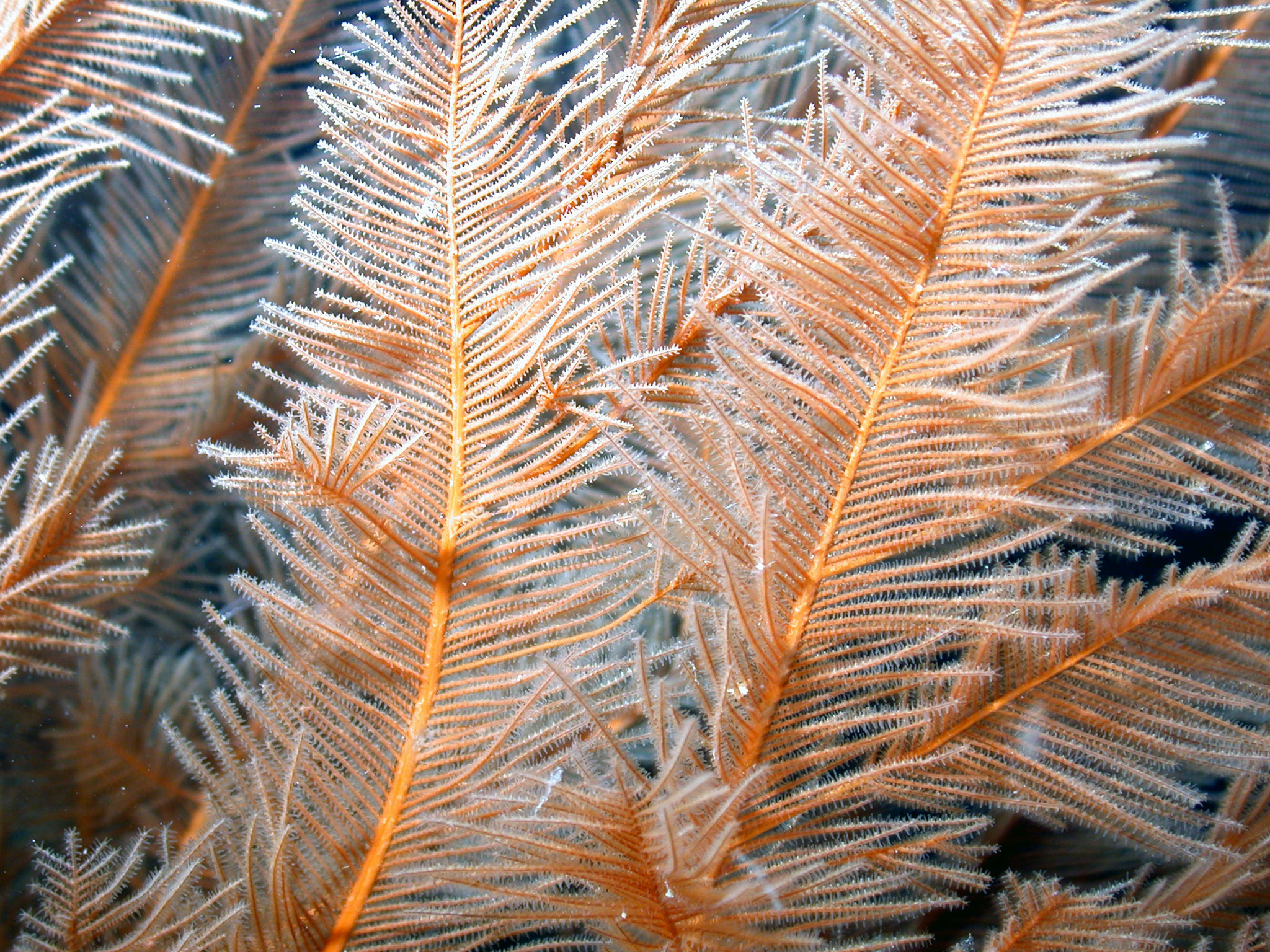
- Plumapathes pennacea

Scientific classification
- Domain: Eukaryota
- Kingdom: Animalia
- Phylum: Cnidaria
- Subphylum: Anthozoa
- Class: Hexacorallia
- Order: Antipatharia
- Family: Myriopathidae
- Genus: Plumapathes

Species
- See text

= Plumapathes =

Genus of corals

Plumapathes is a genus of black coral in the order Antipatharia.

== Species ==
Species included in this genus are:

- Plumapathes fernandezi (Pourtalès, 1874)
- Plumapathes pennacea (Pallas, 1766)
