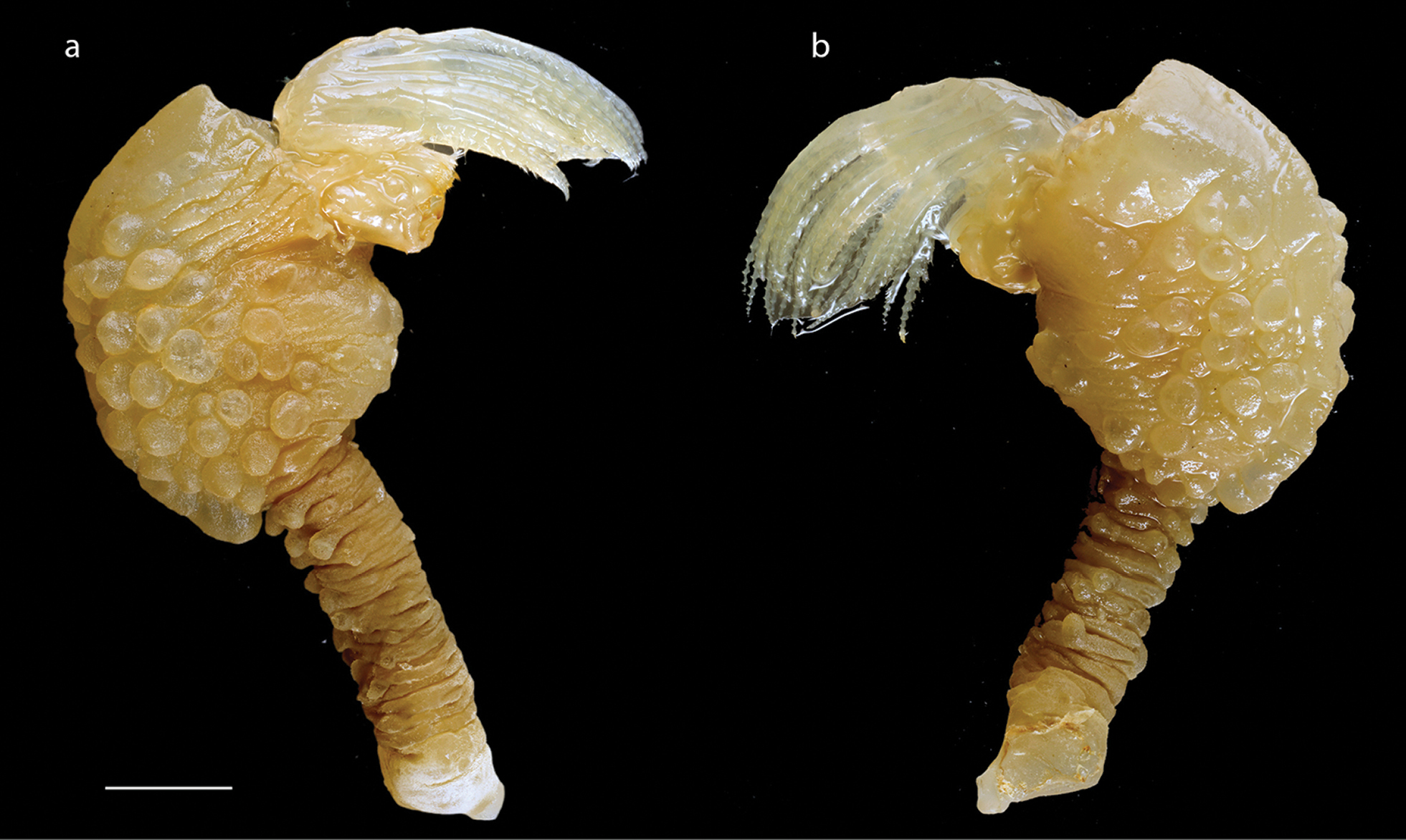
- Paralepas morula

Scientific classification
- Kingdom: Animalia
- Phylum: Arthropoda
- Clade: Pancrustacea
- Class: Thecostraca
- Subclass: Cirripedia
- Order: Scalpellomorpha
- Family: Heteralepadidae
- Genus: Paralepas; Pilsbry, 1907

= Paralepas =

Genus of barnacles

Paralepas is a genus of goose barnacles in the family Heteralepadidae.

== Species ==
The World Register of Marine Species includes the following species in the genus :

- Paralepas americana Pilsbry, 1953
- Paralepas dannevigi (Broch, 1922)
- Paralepas distincta (Utinomi, 1949)
- Paralepas georgei Daniel, 1970
- Paralepas globosa Hiro, 1936
- Paralepas hygrosomi Zevina, 1981
- Paralepas intermedia (Hoek, 1907)
- Paralepas klepalae Kolbasov & Zevina, 1999
- Paralepas laxus Chan, 2009
- Paralepas lithotryae (Hoek, 1907)
- Paralepas maculata Utinomi, 1980
- Paralepas malaysiana (Annandale, 1905)
- Paralepas minuta (Philippi, 1836)
- Paralepas morula (Hoek, 1907)
- Paralepas nodulosa (Broch, 1922)
- Paralepas ovalis (Hoek, 1907)
- Paralepas palinuri (Barnard, 1924)
- Paralepas pedunculata (Hoek, 1883)
- Paralepas percarinata (Pilsbry, 1907)
- Paralepas phyllacanthusi Kim & Kim, 1988
- Paralepas quadrata (Aurivillius, 1894)
- Paralepas robusta Rosell, 1981
- Paralepas rosea (Hiro, 1938)
- Paralepas scutiger (Broch, 1922)
- Paralepas scyllarusi Utinomi, 1967
- Paralepas spinisegma Foster, 1981
- Paralepas tuberosa (Nilsson-Cantell, 1932)
- Paralepas typica Nilsson-Cantell, 1921
- Paralepas xenophorae (Annandale, 1906)
