= Oxynaspis =

Scientific classification
- Kingdom: Animalia
- Phylum: Arthropoda
- Class: Thecostraca
- Subclass: Cirripedia
- Order: Scalpellomorpha
- Family: Poecilasmatidae
- Genus: Oxynaspis; Darwin, 1852

Genus of barnacles

Oxynaspis is a genus of goose barnacles in the order Lepadiformes.

== Genera ==
The following species are listed by the World Register of Marine Species:

- Oxynaspis alatae Totton, 1940
- Oxynaspis auroraensis Chan, Chen & Yu, 2013
- Oxynaspis biradius Chan, Chen & Yu, 2013
- Oxynaspis celata Darwin, 1852
- Oxynaspis connectens Broch, 1931
- Oxynaspis gracilis Totton, 1940
- Oxynaspis indica Annandale, 1910
- Oxynaspis joandianeae Van Syoc & Dekelboum, 2011
- Oxynaspis joankovenae Van Syoc & Dekelboum, 2011
- Oxynaspis pacifica Hiro, 1931
- Oxynaspis perekrestenkoi Van Syoc & Dekelboum, 2011
- Oxynaspis rossi Newman, 1972
- Oxynaspis ryukyuensis Chan & Hayashi, 2012
