= Alepas =

Scientific classification
- Kingdom: Animalia
- Phylum: Arthropoda
- Clade: Pancrustacea
- Class: Thecostraca
- Subclass: Cirripedia
- Order: Scalpellomorpha
- Family: Heteralepadidae
- Genus: Alepas; Rang, 1829

Species
- See text

Genus of barnacles

Alepas is a genus of goose barnacles in the family Heteralepadidae.

== Species ==
The World Register of Marine Species includes the following species in the genus :

- Alepas navigator Pilsbry, 1912
- Alepas pacifica Pilsbry, 1907
- Alepas pellucida (Aurivillius, 1894)
- Alepas spectrum Pilsbry, 1912
- Alepas univalvis Quoy & Gaimard, 1827
