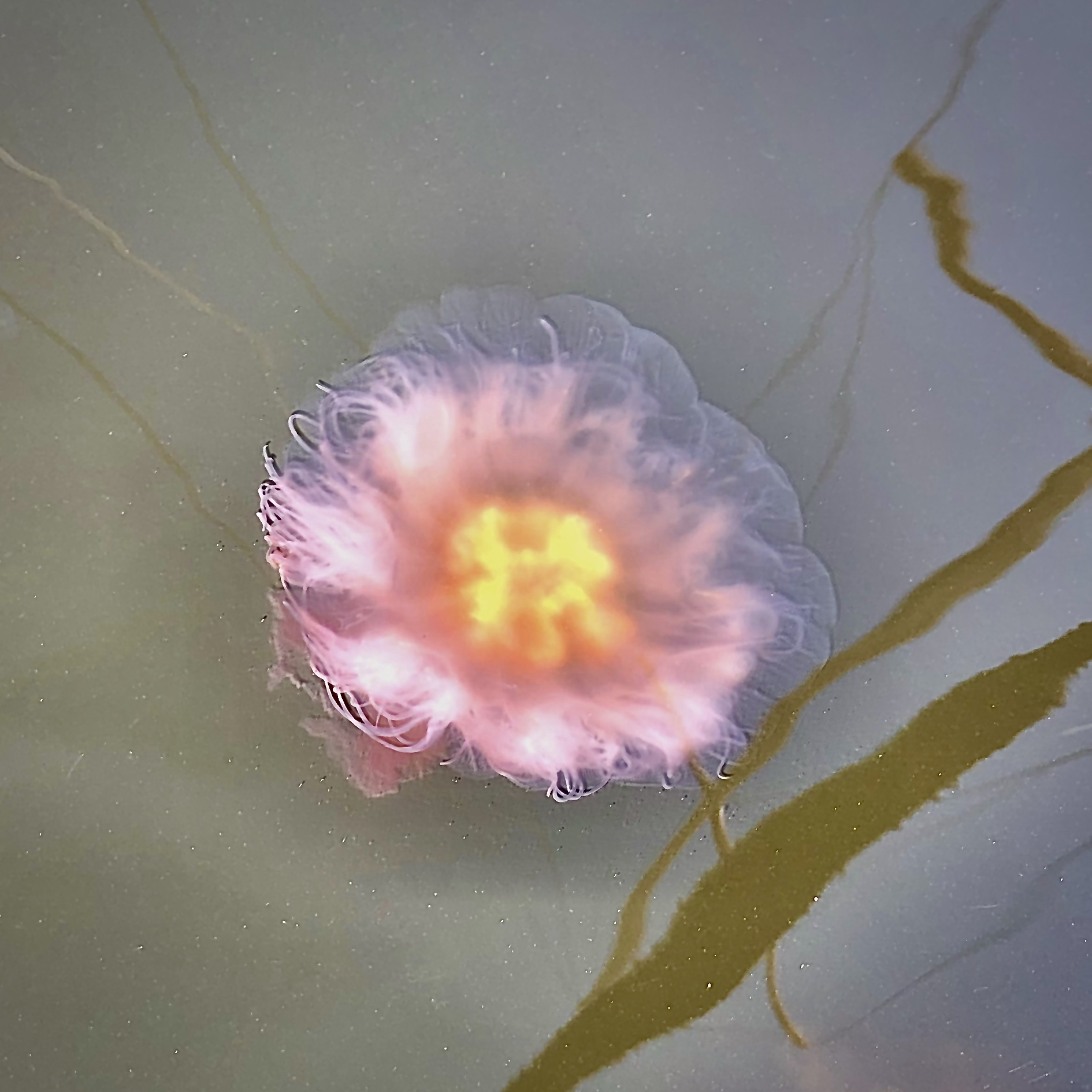

Scientific classification
- Kingdom: Animalia
- Phylum: Cnidaria
- Class: Scyphozoa
- Order: Semaeostomeae
- Family: Cyaneidae
- Genus: Cyanea
- Species: C. versicolor

Binomial name
- Cyanea versicolor Agassiz, 1862

= Cyanea versicolor =

Species of jellyfish

Cyanea versicolor, also known as the dwarf lion's mane jellyfish, is a species of jellyfish in the family Cyaneidae.

== Description ==
From Medusae of the World Vol. III (1910)

"This form bears the same relation to Cyanea arctica var. fulva as fulva does to the northern C. arctica. It is smaller than fulva, but is distinguished especially by its pink coloration. Mature medusae are about 10 mm. in diameter and are found in swarms off the coast between Cape Hatteras, North Carolina, and Cape Canaveral, Florida. They are practically confined to pure open water and do not frequent the harbors. The mature medusae bear many ball-like clusters of developing planulae gathered into the peripheral canals of the gastric space. The gelatinous substance of the disk is translucent milky-blue in color, while the gastro- vascular space, gonads, radial and circular muscles of the subumbrella and the entodermal cores of the tentacles are purplish-pink. The outer parts of the veil-like folds of the palps are amber-brown, while the parts adjacent to the mouth are pink. The concretions of the 8 sense-organs are reddish-brown. The planulae are yellow, but the ephyra is pink. The curtain-like oral fringes are relatively smaller than in Cyanea arctica. However, the chief-distinction of C. versicolor is its peculiar pink coloration. Even in the young ephyra only 2.5 mm. in diameter, the stomach-cavity displays a deep purplish-pink, very different from the pale yellow-colored ephyra of the southern C. fulva. Mature medusae of C. versicolor occur in the winter months along our southern coast. " Among thousands observed by the author during the winter of 1904-05 not more than a dozen lacked the pink coloration and these resembled the variety C.capillata var. fulva. They were, however, swimming among swarms of the typical pink versicolor medusae. The variety versicolor appears to be a well-marked local race of Cyanea capillata."

== Range ==
Marine Ecoregions:

Northern Gulf of Mexico

South Florida/Bahamian Atlantic

Carolinian Atlantic

Virginian Atlantic

== Habitat ==
Coastal Estuarine

== Ecology ==
Feeding: Most zooplankton including ctenophores, hydromedusae and other scyphozoans.

== Etymology ==
versicolor [Latin] = having colors that change

== Taxonomy ==
Agassiz 1862 - sp. nov.

Mayer 1910 - C. capillata var. versicolor

Kramp 1961 - nomen dubium

Russell 1970 - C. versicolor

Brewer 1991 - C. arctica

Jarms et al. 2019 - C. versicolor
