= Oxynaspididae =

Scientific classification
- Kingdom: Animalia
- Phylum: Arthropoda
- Clade: Pancrustacea
- Class: Thecostraca
- Order: Lepadiformes
- Suborder: Lepadomorpha
- Family: Oxynaspididae; Gruvel, 1905

Genera
- See text

Family of barnacles

Oxynaspididae is a family of goose barnacles in the order Lepadiformes.

== Genera ==
The following genera are listed by the World Register of Marine Species:

- Archoxnyaspis Van Syoc & Dekelboum, 2011 †
- Minyaspis Van Syoc & Dekelboum, 2011
- Oxynaspis Darwin, 1852
- Scleraspis Van Syoc & Dekelboum, 2012
