= Dianajonesia =

Scientific classification
- Kingdom: Animalia
- Phylum: Arthropoda
- Class: Thecostraca
- Subclass: Cirripedia
- Order: Scalpellomorpha
- Family: Poecilasmatidae
- Genus: Dianajonesia; Koçak & Kemal, 2008

Genus of barnacles

Dianajonesia is a genus of goose barnacles in the family Poecilasmatidae. The taxon is a replacement name for the previously used Temnaspis, which by precedence is now accorded to a genus of megalopodid beetles. The type species of the genus is D. fissum, originally described by Charles Darwin as Poecilasma fissa. The genus contains the following species:

- Dianajonesia amygdalum (Aurivilius, 1894)
- Dianajonesia bathynomi (Annandale, 1906)
- Dianajonesia excavatum (Hoek, 1907)
- Dianajonesia fissum (Darwin, 1851)
- Dianajonesia kilepoae (Zevina, 1968)
- Dianajonesia lenticula (Aurivilius, 1894)
- Dianajonesia minutum (Gruvel, 1902)
- Dianajonesia tridens (Aurivilius, 1894)
- Dianajonesia vagans (Aurivilius, 1894)
