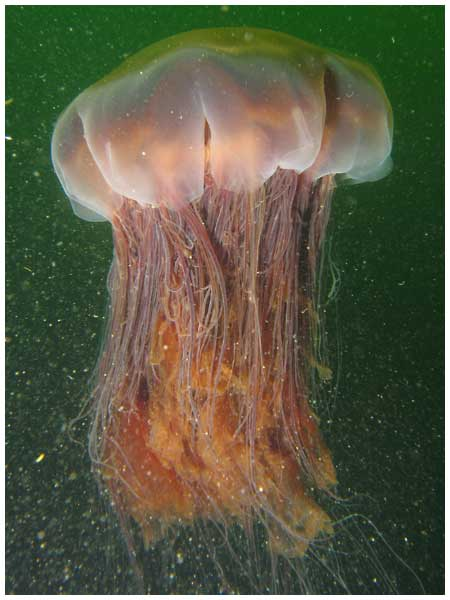
- Lion's mane jellyfish, Cyanea capillata
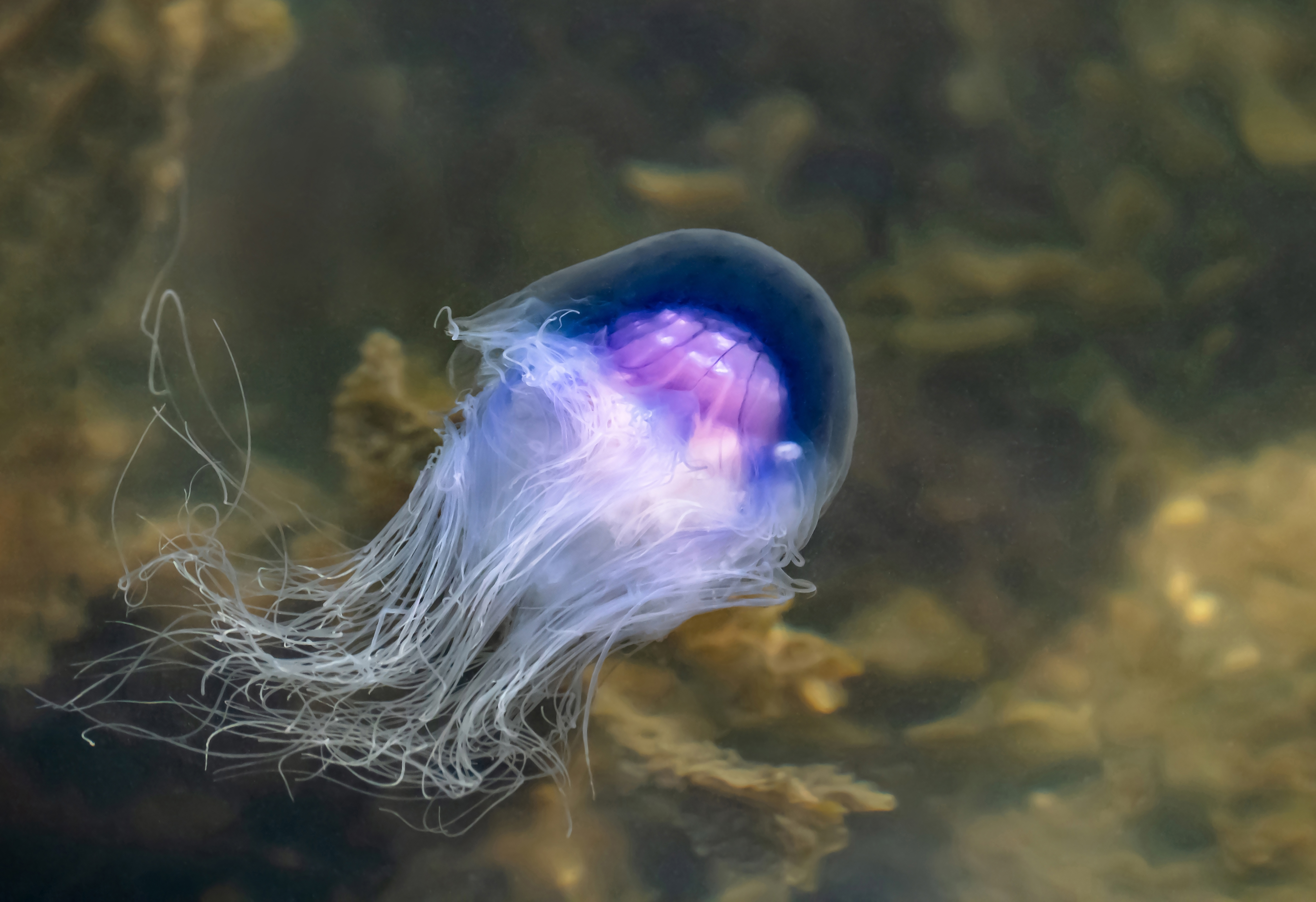
- Cyanea lamarckii

Scientific classification
- Kingdom: Animalia
- Phylum: Cnidaria
- Class: Scyphozoa
- Order: Semaeostomeae
- Family: Cyaneidae
- Genus: Cyanea; Péron and Lesueur, 1809

Species
- See text

= Cyanea (cnidarian) =

Genus of jellyfishes

Cyanea is a genus of jellyfish, primarily found in northern waters of the Atlantic and Pacific Oceans and southern Pacific waters of Australia and New Zealand, there are also several boreal, polar, tropical and sub-tropical species. Commonly found in and associated with rivers and fjords. The same genus name has been given to a genus of plants of the Hawaiian lobelioids, an example of a parahomonym (same name, different kingdom).

== Species ==
The taxonomy of Cyanea species has seen increased scrutiny in recent years. Early zoologists suggested that all species within the genus should be treated as one. Recent molecular and integrative taxonomic studies have refuted this assertion as the scyphozoan community has restored many of the previous species. For example, in the North Sea, the lion's mane jellyfish and the blue jellyfish appear as distinct species. On the East Coast of the United States there are at least two co-occurring species, C. fulva and C. versicolor. Cyanea may be a species complex of recently diverged species.

- Cyanea annasethe Haeckel, 1880
- Cyanea annaskala von Lendenfeld, 1882
- Cyanea barkeri Gershwin, Zeidler & Davie, 2010 [nomen dubium]
- Cyanea buitendijki Stiasny, 1919
- Cyanea capillata Linnaeus, 1758
- Cyanea citrea Kishinouye, 1910
- Cyanea ferruginea Eschscholtz, 1829
- Cyanea fulva Agassiz, 1862
- Cyanea lamarckii Péron & Lesueur, 1810
- Cyanea mjöbergi Stiasny, 1921
- Cyanea muellerianthe Haacke, 1887
- Cyanea nozakii Kishinouye, 1891
- Cyanea postelsi Brandt, 1835
- Cyanea purpurea Kishinouye, 1910
- Cyanea rosea Quoy & Gaimard, 1824
- Cyanea tzetlinii Kolbasova & Neretina, 2015
- Cyanea versicolor Agassiz, 1862
