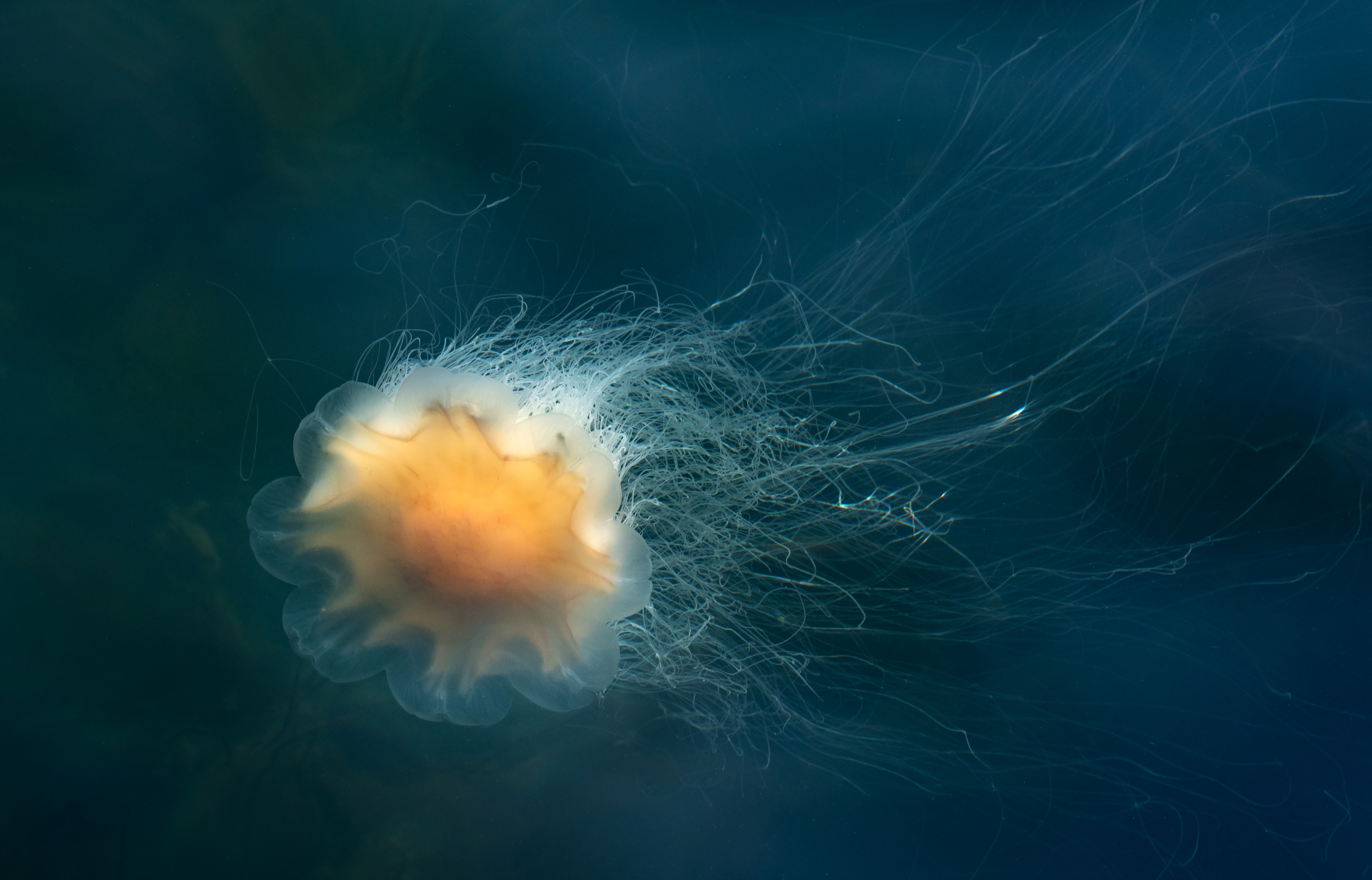
- In Gullmarn fjord at Sämstad, Lysekil Municipality, Sweden

Scientific classification
- Kingdom: Animalia
- Phylum: Cnidaria
- Class: Scyphozoa
- Order: Semaeostomeae
- Family: Cyaneidae
- Genus: Cyanea
- Species: C. capillata

Binomial name
- Cyanea capillata (Linnaeus, 1758)

Synonyms
- Cyanea arctica Péron & Lesueur, 1810; Cyanea baltica Péron & Lesueur, 1810; Cyanea borealis Péron & Lesueur, 1810; Medusa capillata Linnaeus, 1758

= Lion's mane jellyfish =

Species of jellyfish

The lion's mane jellyfish (Cyanea capillata) is one of the largest known species of jellyfish. Its range is confined to cold, boreal waters of the Arctic, northern Atlantic, and northern Pacific Oceans. It is common in the English Channel, Irish Sea, North Sea, and in western Scandinavian waters south to Kattegat and Øresund. Some may also drift outside of their usual perimeters during periods of increased warming, including into the southwestern part of the Baltic Sea (where it cannot breed due to the low salinity). Similar jellyfish – which may be the same species – are known to inhabit seas near Australia and New Zealand. The largest recorded specimen was measured off the coast of Massachusetts in 1865 and had a bell with a diameter of 210 centimetres (7 feet) and tentacles around 36.6 m (120 ft) long. Lion's mane jellyfish have been observed below 42°N latitude for some time in the larger bays of the East Coast of the United States.

== Name ==
The lion's mane jellyfish is also known as the arctic red jellyfish, hair jelly, snottie, sea blubber or giant jellyfish.

== Taxonomy ==
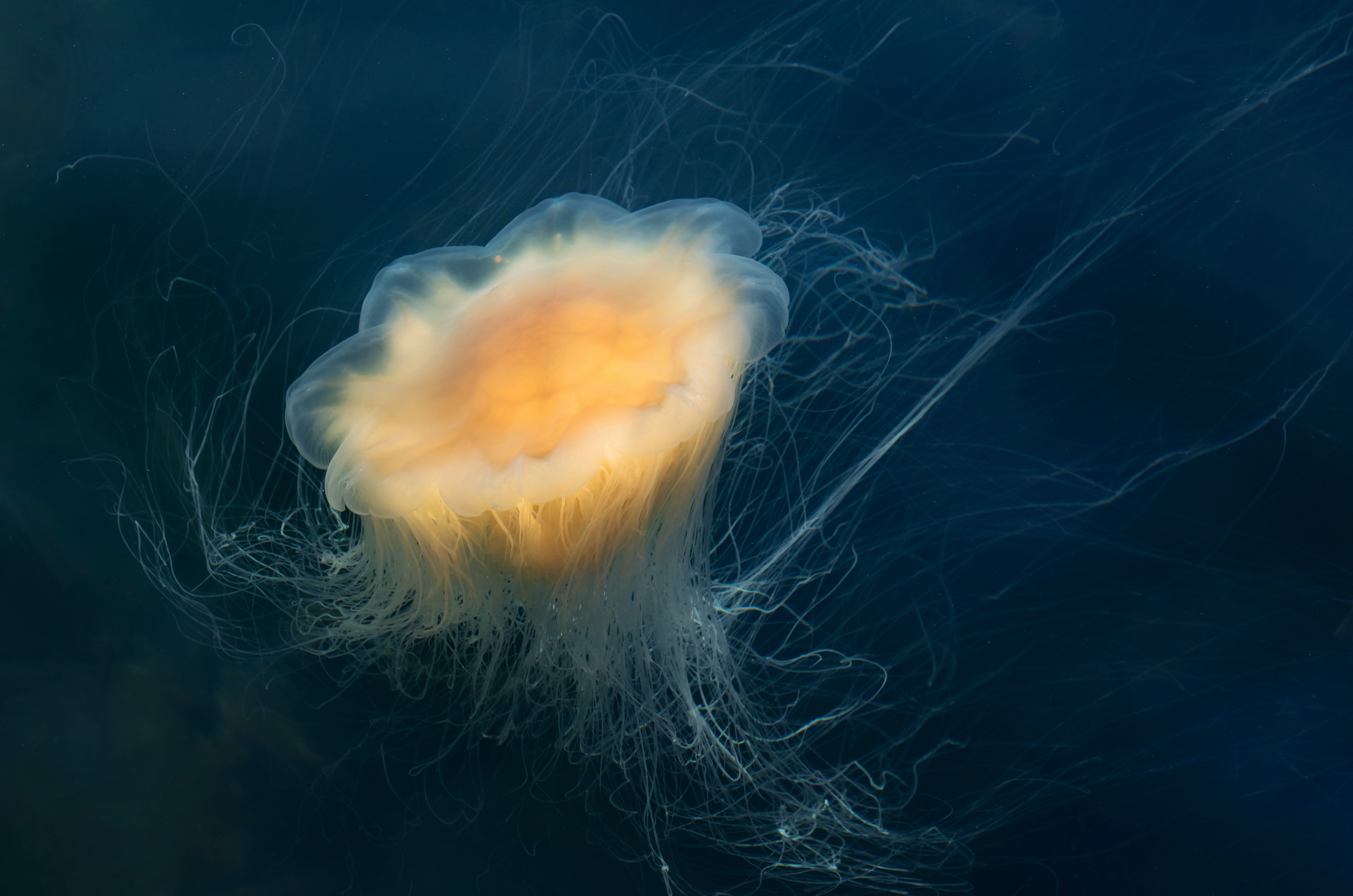
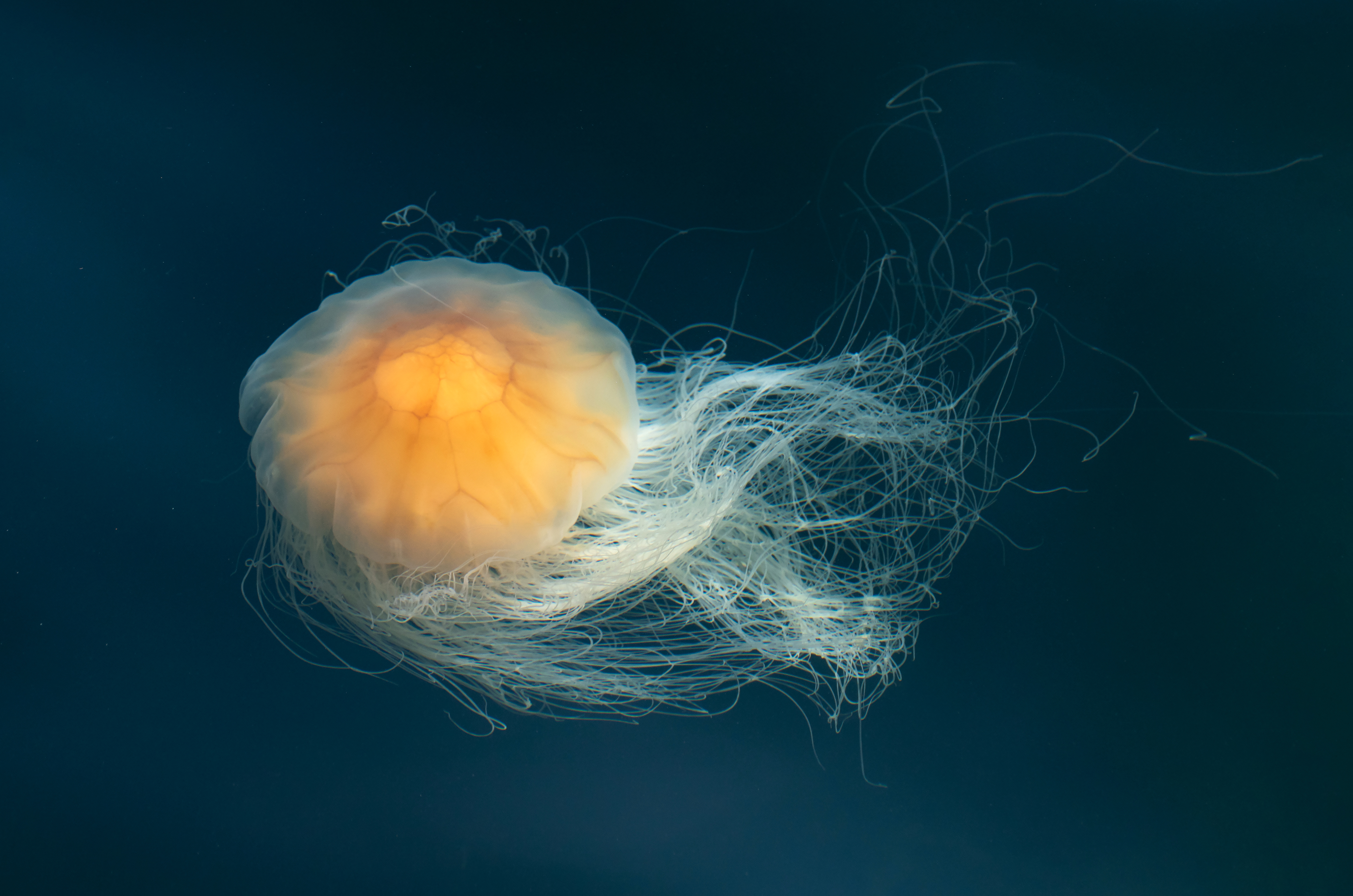
Cyanea capillata, expanding (top), contracting (bottom)

The taxonomy of the Cyanea species is not fully agreed upon; some zoologists have suggested that all species within the genus should be treated as one. Two distinct taxa, however, occur together in at least the eastern North Atlantic, with the blue jellyfish (Cyanea lamarckii Péron & Lesueur, 1810) differing in color (blue, not red) and smaller size (10–20 cm [3 7/8–7 7/8 inches] diameter, rarely 35 cm [14 inches]). Populations in the western Pacific around Japan are sometimes distinguished as Cyanea nozakii, or as a subspecies, C. c. nozakii. In 2015, Russian researchers announced a possible sister species, Cyanea tzetlinii found in the White Sea.

== Description ==
Lion's mane jellyfish (Cyanea capillata) are named for their showy, trailing tentacles reminiscent of a lion's mane. They can vary greatly in size: although capable of attaining a bell diameter of over 2 m (6 ft 7 in), those found in lower latitudes are normally smaller than their far northern counterparts, with a bell about 50 cm (20 in) in diameter. Furthermore, larger specimens are typically further offshore than smaller ones. Juveniles are lighter orange or tan, but start to darken to red and purple as they age.

While most jellyfish have a circular bell, the bell of the Lion's Mane is divided into eight lobes, giving it the look of an eight-point star. Each lobe contains about 70 to 150 tentacles, arranged in four fairly distinct rows. Along the bell margin is a balance organ at each of the eight indentations between the lobes – the rhopalium – which helps the jellyfish orient itself. From the central mouth extend broad frilly oral arms with many stinging cells called cnidocytes. Closer to its mouth, its total number of tentacles is around 1,200.

The long, thin tentacles which emanate from the bell's subumbrella have been characterised as "extremely sticky"; they also have stinging cells. The tentacles of larger specimens may trail as long as 30 m (100 ft) or more, with the tentacles of the longest known specimen measured at 36.6 m (120 ft) in length, although it has been suggested that this specimen may actually have belonged to a different Cyanea species. (The lack of other size measurements of Cyanea in the literature, and of details on how the specimens were measured, has led to skepticism about reported length records.) This unusual length – longer than a blue whale – has earned it the status of one of the longest known animals in the world.

== Behavior and reproduction ==
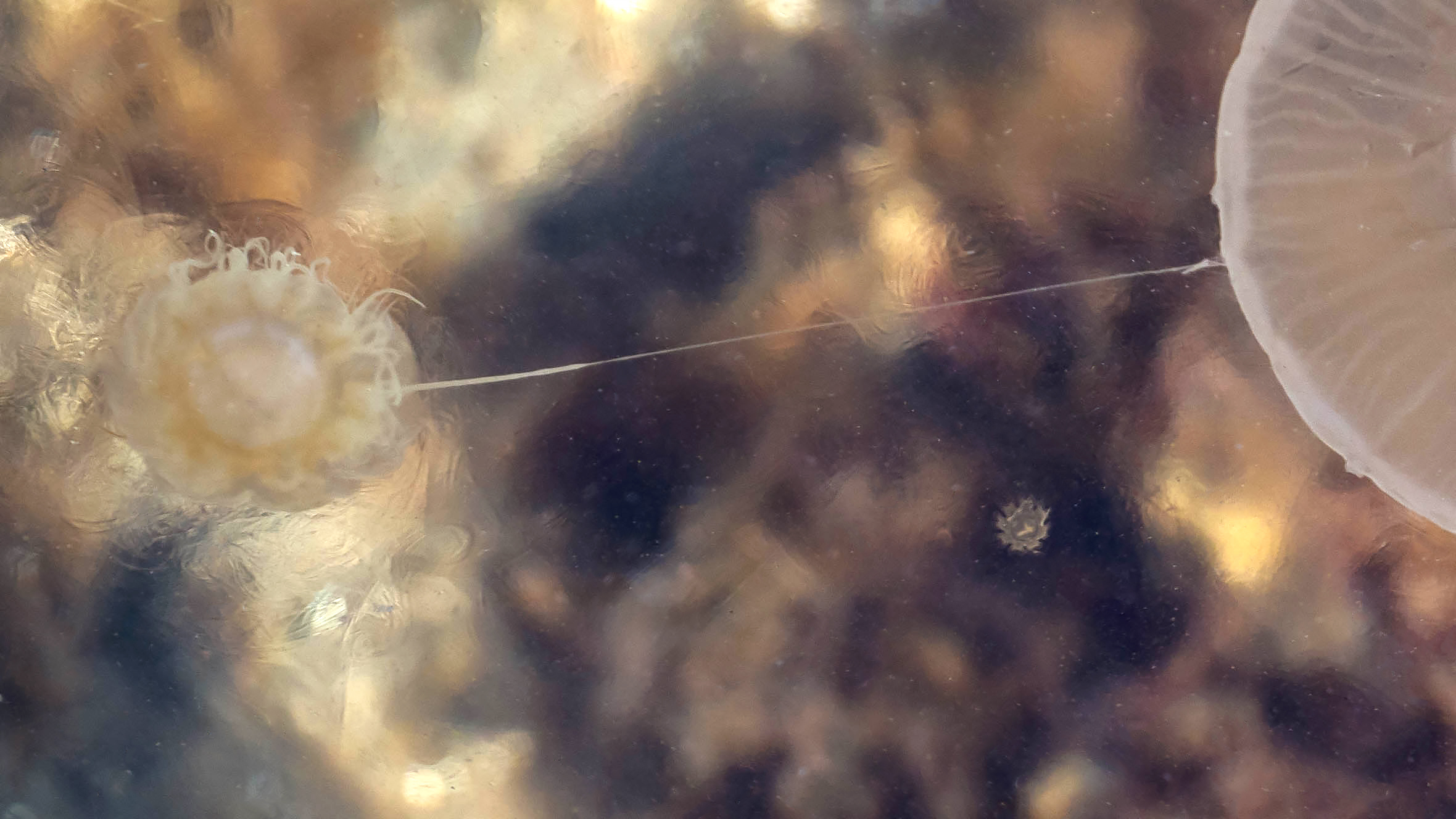
Lion's mane jellyfish ephyrae form between two medusas.

Lion's mane jellyfish remain mostly very near the surface, at no more than 20 m (66 ft) depth. Their slow pulsations weakly drive them forward, so they depend on ocean currents to travel great distances. The jellyfish are most often spotted during the late summer and autumn, when they have grown to a large size and the currents begin to sweep them to shore. Unlike most pelagic jellyfish, they are completely solitary and rarely travel in groups.

The lion's mane jellyfish uses its stinging tentacles to capture, pull in, and eat prey such as fish, zooplankton, and smaller jellyfish.

Like other jellyfish, lion's manes are capable of both sexual reproduction in the medusa stage and asexual reproduction in the polyp stage. Lion's mane jellyfish have four different stages in their year-long lifespan: a larval stage, a polyp stage, an ephyrae stage, and the medusa stage. The female jellyfish carries its fertilized eggs in a tentacle, where the eggs grow into larvae. When the larvae are old enough, the female deposits them on a hard surface, where the larvae soon grow into polyps. The polyps begin to reproduce asexually, creating stacks of small, immature medusae called ephyrae. The individual ephyrae break off from the stacks, where they eventually grow into the mature medusa stage to become full-grown jellyfish.

== Predators ==
A fully grown adult lion's mane jellyfish has very few natural predators due to their large size and abundance of stinging tentacles. However, juveniles are preyed upon by seabirds, larger fish such as ocean sunfish, other jellyfish species, and most sea turtles. Anemones have been documented eating both adults and juveniles. The leatherback sea turtle feeds almost exclusively on them in large quantities during the summer season around Eastern Canada.

== Sting and human contact ==
Lion's mane jellyfish swimming, side view

Human encounters with the jellyfish can cause temporary pain and localized redness. In normal circumstances, however, and in healthy individuals, the stings of the jellyfish are not known to be fatal; vinegar can be used to deactivate the nematocysts. If there is contact with a large number of tentacles, however, medical attention is recommended after exposure.

There may be a significant difference between touching a few tentacles with fingertips at a beach and accidentally swimming into the jellyfish. Their sting has been described as very painful, feeling like an intense itching or burning sensation. Normally, there is no real danger to humans (with the exception of people suffering from special allergies), but in cases when someone has been stung over large parts of their body not just by the longest tentacles but by the entire jellyfish (including the inner tentacles, of which there are around 1,200), medical attention is recommended as systemic effects can be present. Although rare, severe stings in deep water can also cause panic followed by drowning.

Their tentacles may retain the ability to sting for up to 25 days after detaching from a jellyfish. This could potentially harm animals that come into contact with a detached tentacle within this time frame, including fish farmed in the marine environments that these jellyfish inhabit.

In July 2010, around 150 beachgoers were stung by the remains of a broken-up lion's mane jellyfish along Wallis Sands State Beach in Rye, New Hampshire, US. Considering the size of the species, it is believed that this incident was caused by a single specimen.

== In popular culture ==
A photograph widely distributed on the internet appears to show an anomalously large lion's mane dwarfing a nearby diver. The photo was subsequently shown to be a hoax.

On the television program QI, the show claimed that the longest animal in the world was the lion's mane jellyfish. This was later corrected – in 1864, a certain William M'Intosh had described a specimen of bootlace worm (Lineus longissimus) that had washed ashore in the aftermath of a severe storm by St Andrews (in Fife, eastern Scotland), allegedly more than 55 m (180 ft) long. The claim is subject to scepticism, as bootlace worms can easily stretch to several times their natural length, so it is possible the worm did not actually grow to be that length. If that is the case, the lion's mane jellyfish would indeed be the longest animal in the world.

The creature is referred to as the culprit in the 1926 short story "The Adventure of the Lion's Mane" in The Case-Book of Sherlock Holmes by Sir Arthur Conan Doyle.

== Gallery ==
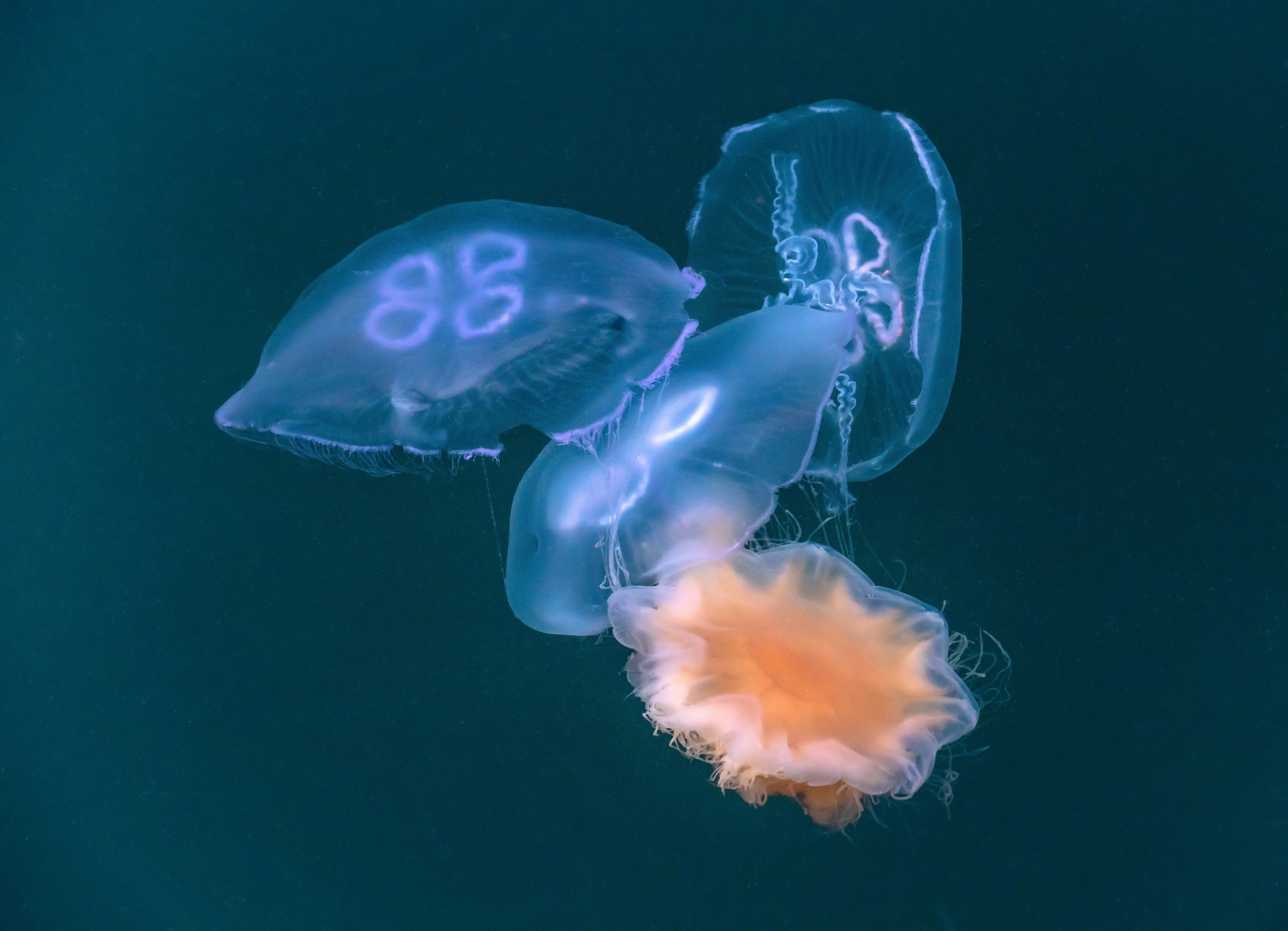
Lion's mane jellyfish capturing three moon jellyfishes

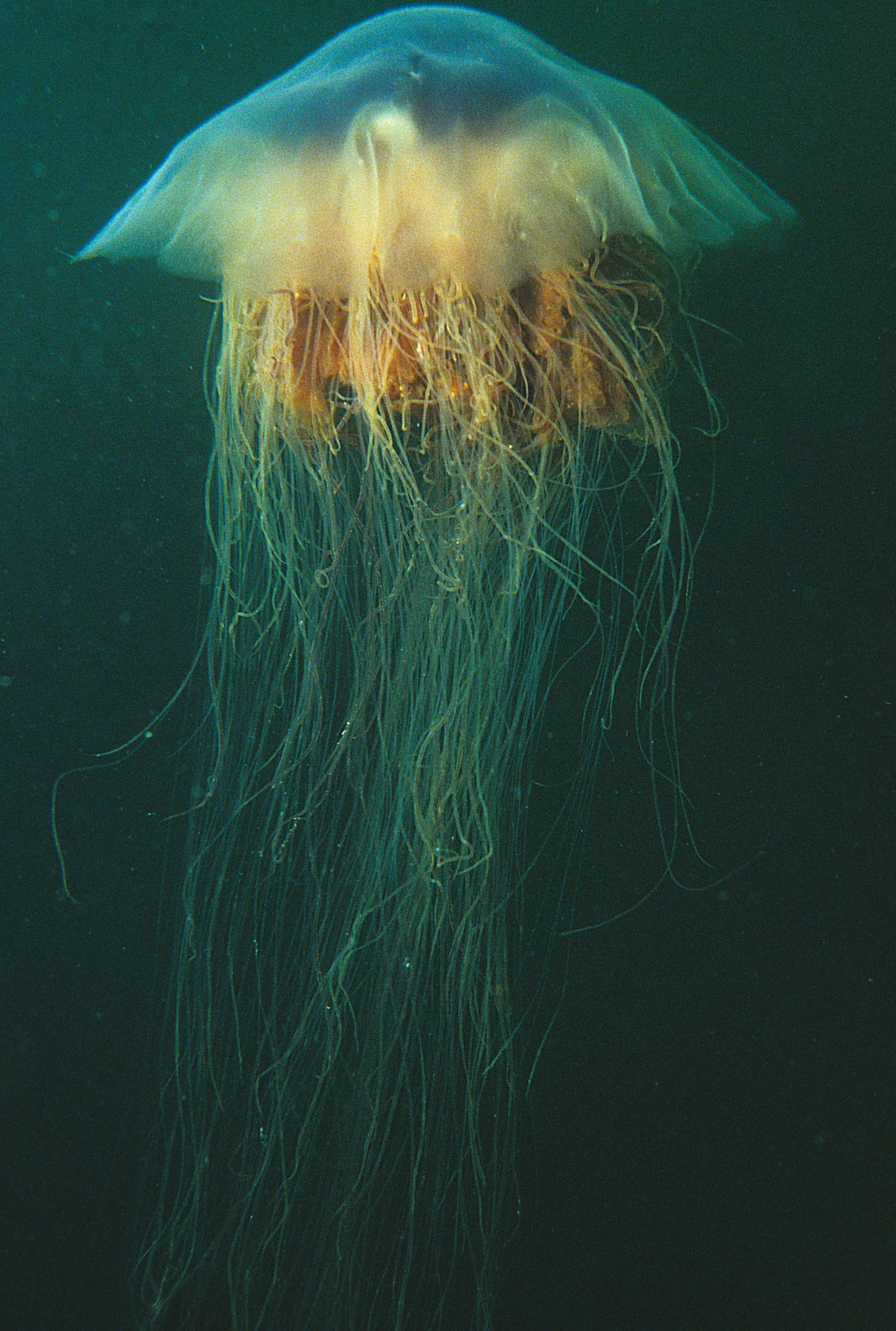
Lion's mane jellyfish with full threads visible

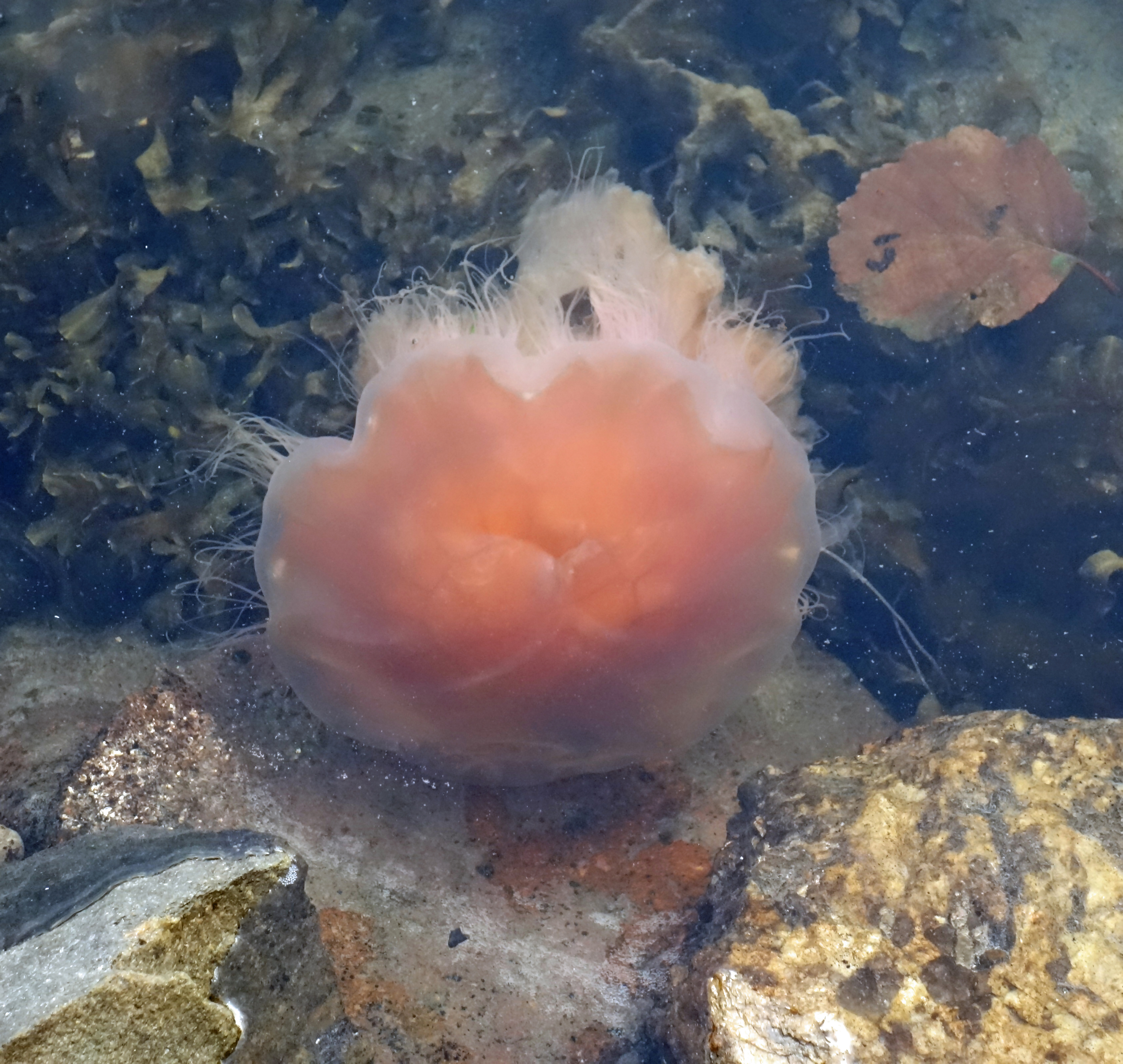
Lion's mane jellyfish contracted

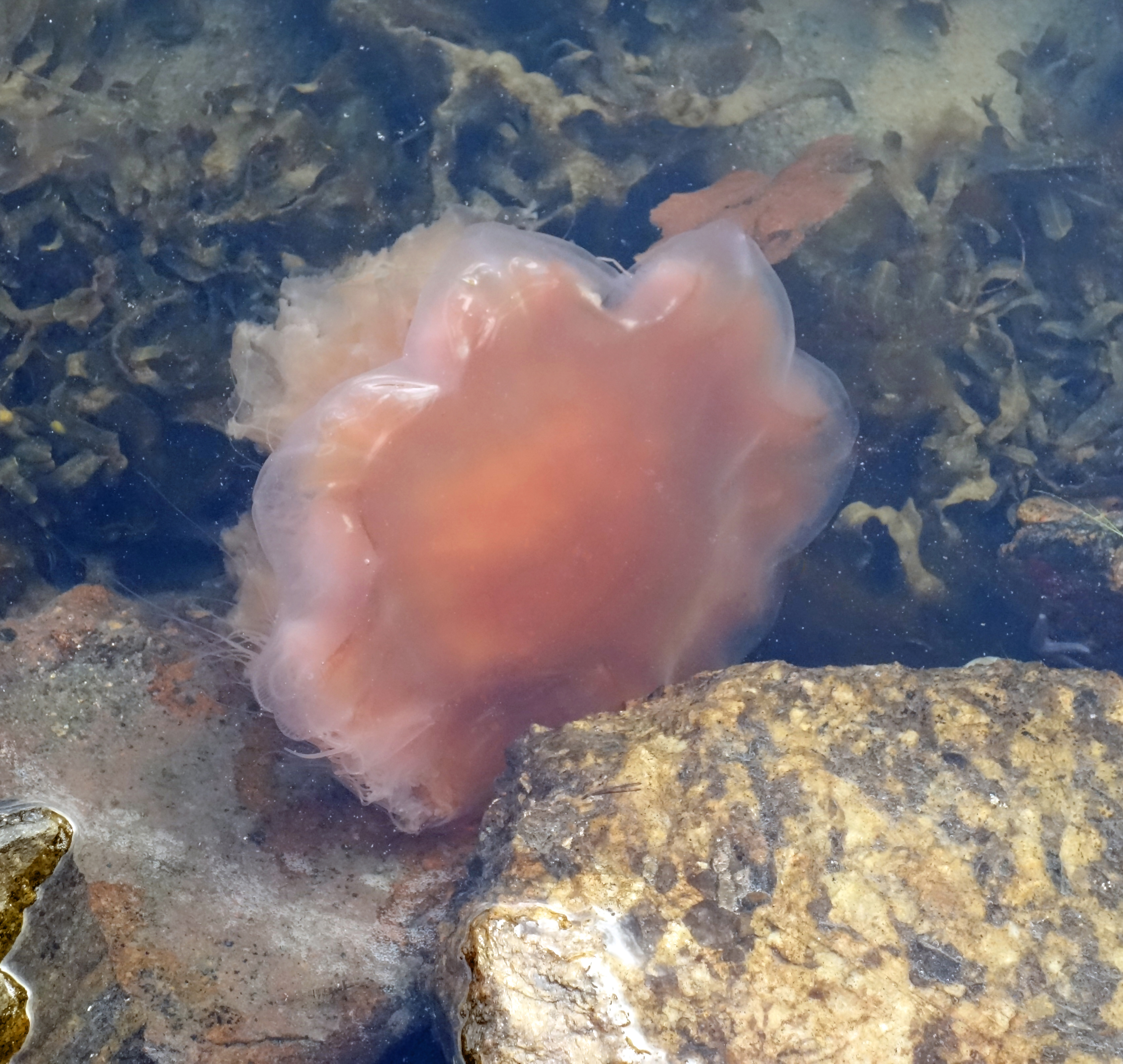
Lion's mane jellyfish expanding into star formation

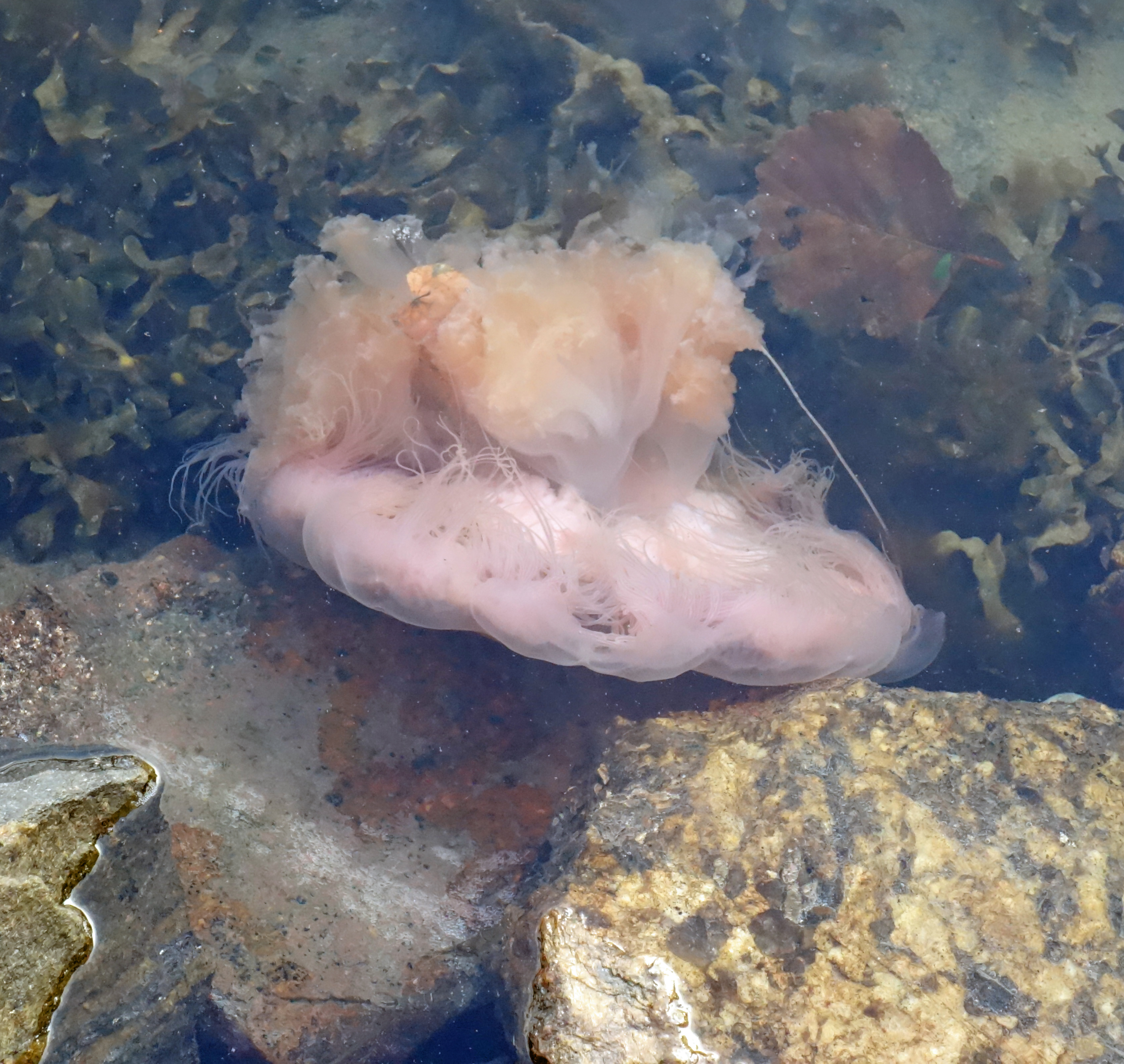
Lion's mane jellyfish open, showing underside

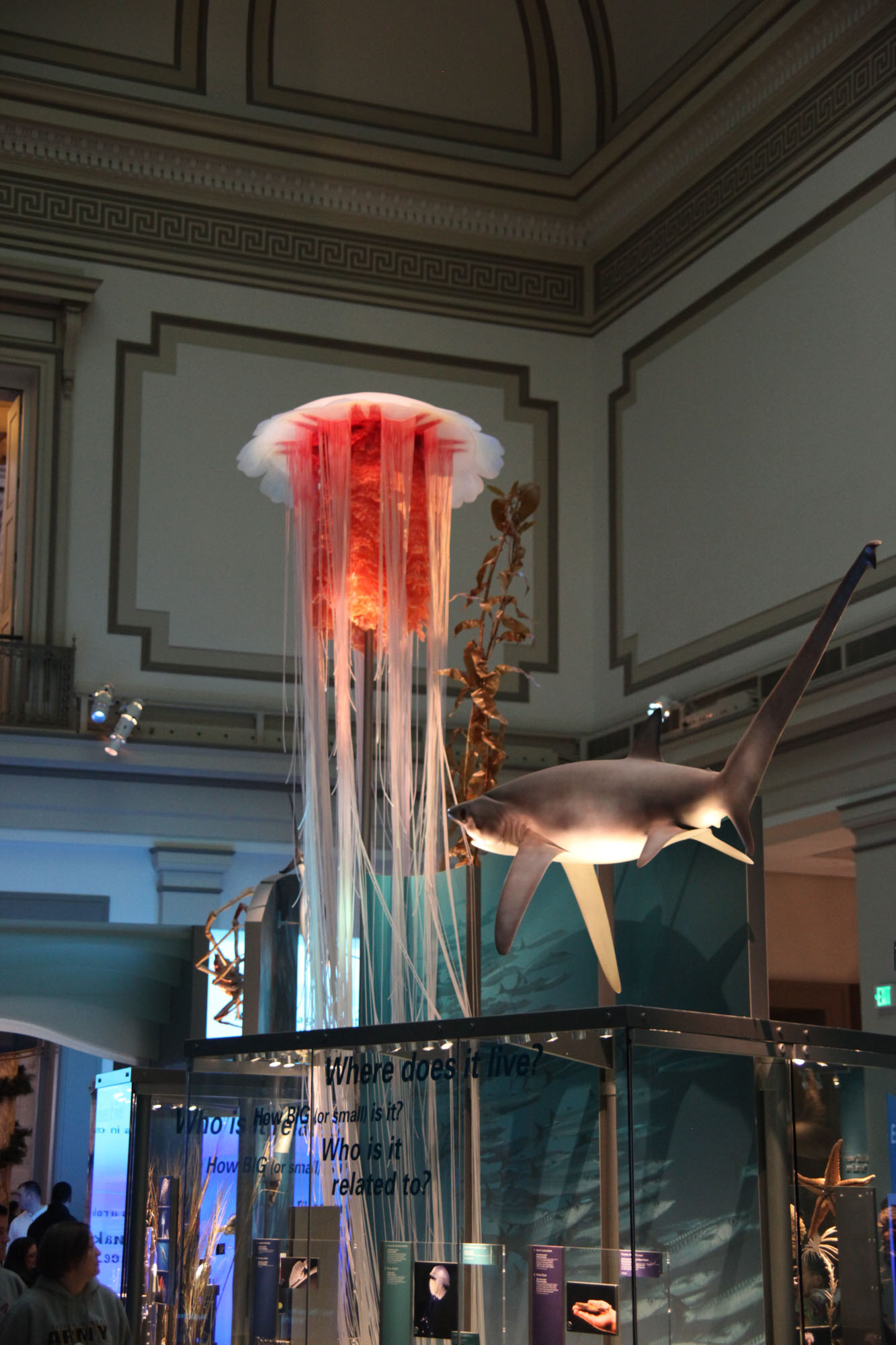
Life-sized model in the Smithsonian Museum of Natural History, Washington DC, US

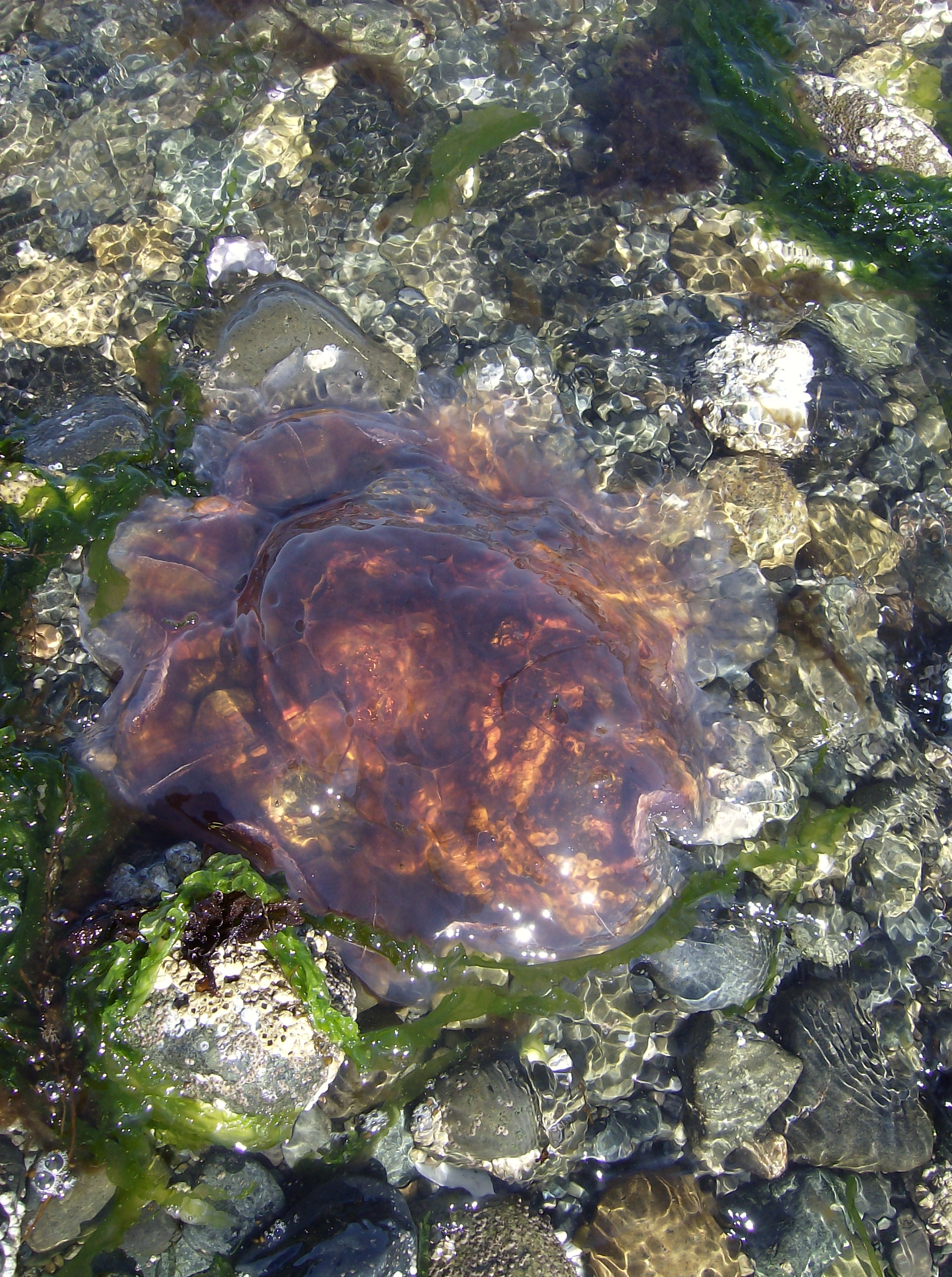
Small, dead lion's mane jelly washing up on the beach
