= Cyanea barkeri =

Scientific classification
- Kingdom: Animalia
- Phylum: Cnidaria
- Class: Scyphozoa
- Order: Semaeostomeae
- Family: Cyaneidae
- Genus: Cyanea
- Species: C. barkeri

Binomial name
- Cyanea barkeri Gershwin, Zeidler & Davie, 2010

Species of jellyfish

Cyanea barkeri is a species of true jellyfish in the family Cyaneidae. It has been found in waters off the coast of Australia.

== Etymology ==
The specific epithet, barkeri, was given in honor of Paul Barker, the lifeguard supervisor of the Mackay Region in 2010, and his brother, Dave Barker. The generic name, Cyanea, is derived from the Latin cyaneus, meaning "deep or dark blue in color".

== Common names ==
Cyanea barkeri are also known as 'snotties' or 'hair jellies'.
