= Koleolepas =

Scientific classification
- Domain: Eukaryota
- Kingdom: Animalia
- Phylum: Arthropoda
- Class: Thecostraca
- Subclass: Cirripedia
- Order: Scalpellomorpha
- Family: Heteralepadidae
- Genus: Koleolepas; Stebbing, 1900

Genus of crustaceans

Koleolepas is a genus of crustaceans belonging to the family Heteralepadidae.

The species of this genus are found in Southwestern Asia.

Species:

- Koleolepas avis (Hiro, 1931)
- Koleolepas tinkeri Edmondson, 1951
- Koleolepas willeyi Stebbing, 1900
