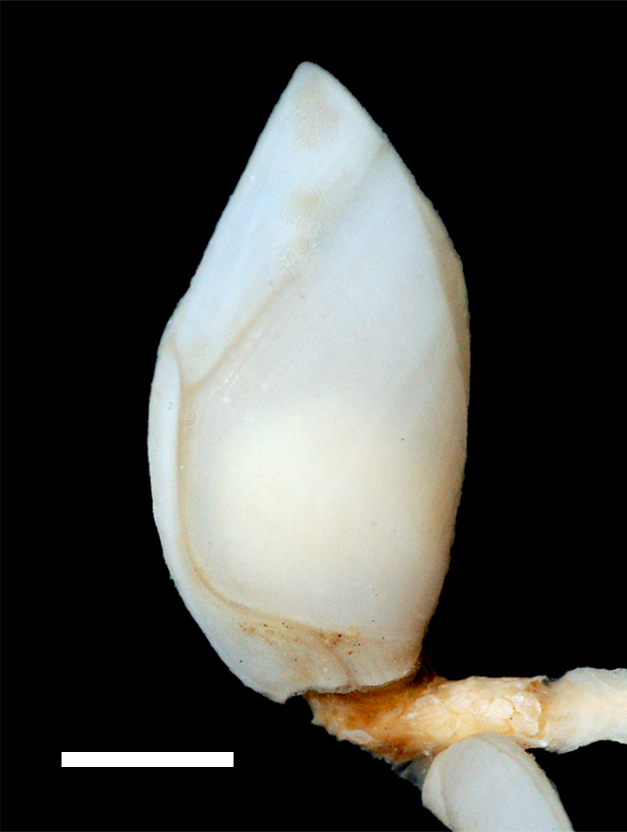
- Glyptelasma hamatum

Scientific classification
- Kingdom: Animalia
- Phylum: Arthropoda
- Clade: Pancrustacea
- Class: Thecostraca
- Subclass: Cirripedia
- Order: Scalpellomorpha
- Superfamily: Lepadoidea
- Family: Poecilasmatidae; Annandale 1909

= Poecilasmatidae =

Family of barnacles

Poecilasmatidae is a family of goose barnacles.

== Genera ==
The World Register of Marine Species includes the following genera in the family, including five genera from the former family Microlepadidae:

- Dianajonesia Koçak & Kemal, 2008
- Dichelaspis Darwin, 1852
- Glyptelasma Pilsbry, 1907
- Megalasma Hoek, 1883
- Microlepas Hoek, 1907
- Minyaspis Van Syoc & Dekelboum, 2011
- Octolasmis Gray, 1825
- Oxynaspis Darwin, 1852
- Pagurolepas Stubbings, 1940
- Poecilasma Darwin, 1852
- Rugilepas Grygier & Newman, 1991
- Scleraspis Van Syoc & Dekelboum, 2012
- Trilasmis Hinds, 1844
- † Archoxynaspis Van Syoc & Dekelboum, 2011
