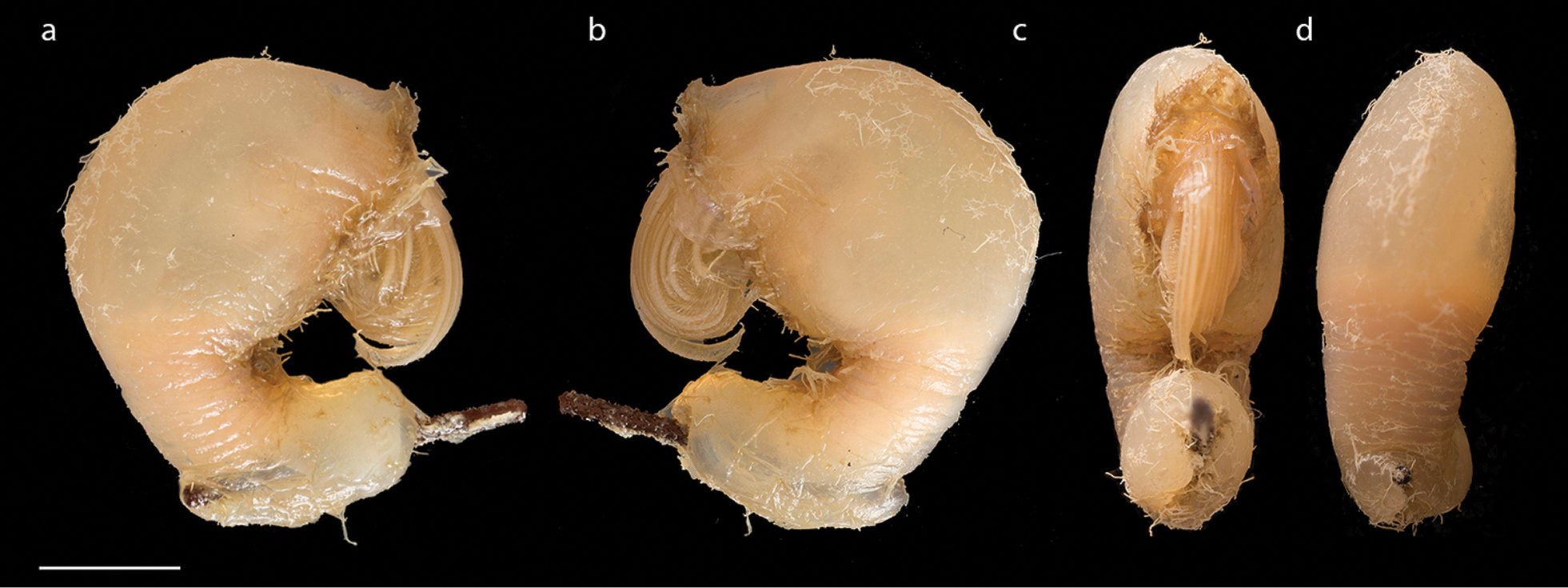
- Heteralepas japonica

Scientific classification
- Kingdom: Animalia
- Phylum: Arthropoda
- Clade: Pancrustacea
- Class: Thecostraca
- Subclass: Cirripedia
- Order: Scalpellomorpha
- Superfamily: Lepadoidea
- Family: Heteralepadidae; Nilsson-Cantell, 1921

Genera
- See text

= Heteralepadidae =

Family of barnacles

Heteralepadidae is a family of goose barnacles.

== Genera ==
The World Register of Marine Species includes the following genera in the family :

- Alepas Rang, 1829
- Heteralepas Pilsbry, 1907
- Koleolepas Stebbing, 1900
- Paralepas Pilsbry, 1907
