= Desmonema =

Desmonema may refer to:

- Desmonema (cnidarian), a genus of jellyfishes in the family Cyaneidae
- Desmonema (plant), a genus of plants generally considered synonymous with Hyalosepalum
