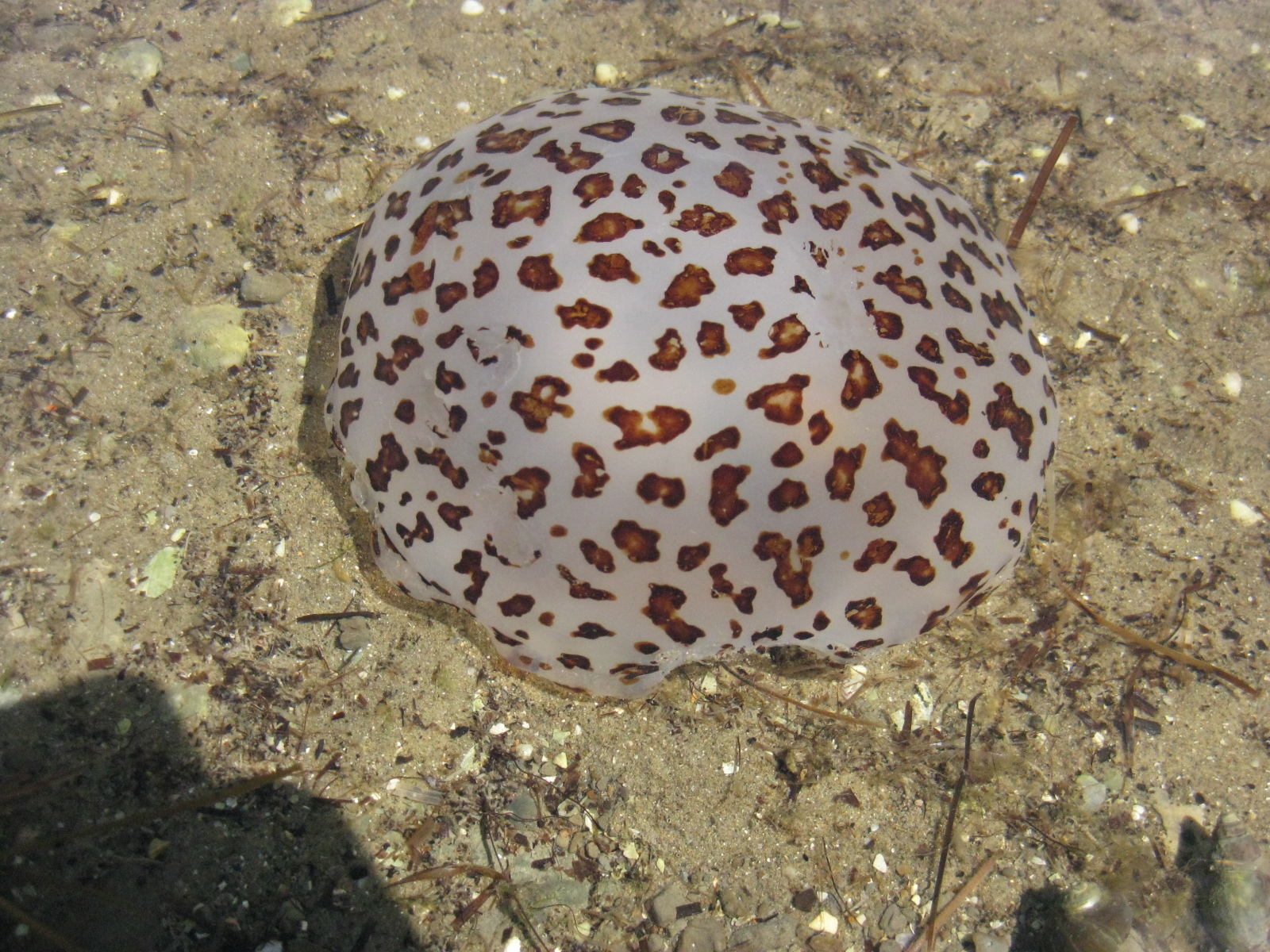
- Desmonema gaudichaudi

Scientific classification
- Kingdom: Animalia
- Phylum: Cnidaria
- Class: Scyphozoa
- Order: Semaeostomeae
- Family: Cyaneidae
- Genus: Desmonema; Agassiz 1862

= Desmonema (cnidarian) =

Genus of jellyfish

Desmonema is a genus of jellyfish under the Cyaneidae family found in colder waters near the Antarctic region and off of the coast of Argentina. They have a bell diameter that can extend over 1 meter and wide tentacles that are grouped together in clusters. They share similar anatomical and physiological structures to the genus Cyanea. Their sophisticated structures like the thick tentacles, sensory systems, and gastrovascular system allow Desmonema to easily capture and extracellularly digest their prey. In recent years, Desmonema were reported to have a commensal relationship with fishes under the Trachurus genus and a parasitic relationship with specimens of the Hyperia genus. The genus name derives from the Ancient Greek desmós (δεσμός), meaning "bond", and nêma (νῆμᾰ), meaning "thread".

== Anatomy ==
The anatomical structure of Desmonema closely resembles that of the genus Cyanea. Desmonema tend to have a wider bell diameter between 20 and 100 centimeters compared to other Scyphozoans. They have a strong, well-developed radial and circular arrangement of muscles and thick tentacles that are attached in clusters to the base of their bodies. Similar to their anatomical structures, the gastrovascular system of Desmonema strongly resembles the genus Cyanea. They have 16 radial pouches filled with digestive enzymes that branch off from the stomach to their fluid-filled canals. Digestion begins extracellularly and is completed intracellularly. Scyphozoan jellyfish display sophisticated behavior and process environmental information through their advanced neural network. The nervous system works in conjunction with the statocysts, ocelli, and the sensory lappets.

== Feeding ==
Desmonema are able to capture and extracellularly digest their prey, which in turn speeds up their process of digestion. For example, squid and fish are larger prey that would need to be reduced to smaller particles for easier and more efficient digestion. The nematocysts on their tentacles and oral arms aid in capturing and digesting larger prey. The Desmonema comatum serves as an exception to this rule by feeding on smaller and weaker prey because of their thinner tentacles that would not be able to easily grasp a larger prey. Generally, Desmonema are considered pelagic and benthic predators.

== Population distribution ==
Desmonema are reported to be found near colder regions, specifically towards the Antarctic region. Desmonema gaudichaudi population is commonly found between the Subantarctic Neritic and the Subantarctic Oceanic Domains. Desmonema comatum is found in the Subantarctic region, as well as near the coast of Argentina. Desmonema chierchiana is common in the Falkland Islands in the Subantarctic region.

== Life cycle ==
Falling under the Semaeostome order, Desmonema jellyfish are predicted to follow a metagenetic life cycle. Under this life cycle, a planula larva develops into the deposits of the ocean floor and begins asexually reproducing as a polyp. These sessile polyps are further induced into sexually reproducing medusa by an environmental stimuli. The jellyfish migrate from the deep depths of the ocean to the surface periodically, but tend to be found primarily in deeper waters around 200–3000 meters below sea level. More research must be done to fully understand the temporal patterns and life cycle of these jellyfish.

== Relationships ==
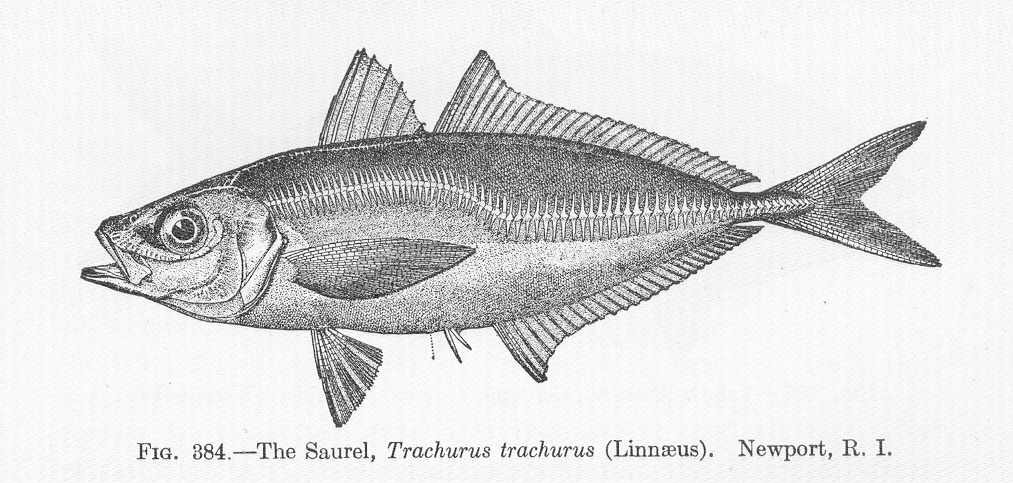
An example of a Trachurus fish that may exhibit a symbiotic relationship with Desmonema. It has not been identified the exact species of Trachurus that displays this relationship. (Trachurus trachurus)

=== Symbiotic ===
In South Australian waters, Desmonema gaudichaudi exhibited a symbiotic relationship with juvenile fishes identified primarily with the Trachurus genus. The harmful nematocysts of jellyfish make them more appealing hosts for smaller specimen, like fish, crustaceans, helminths, etc.

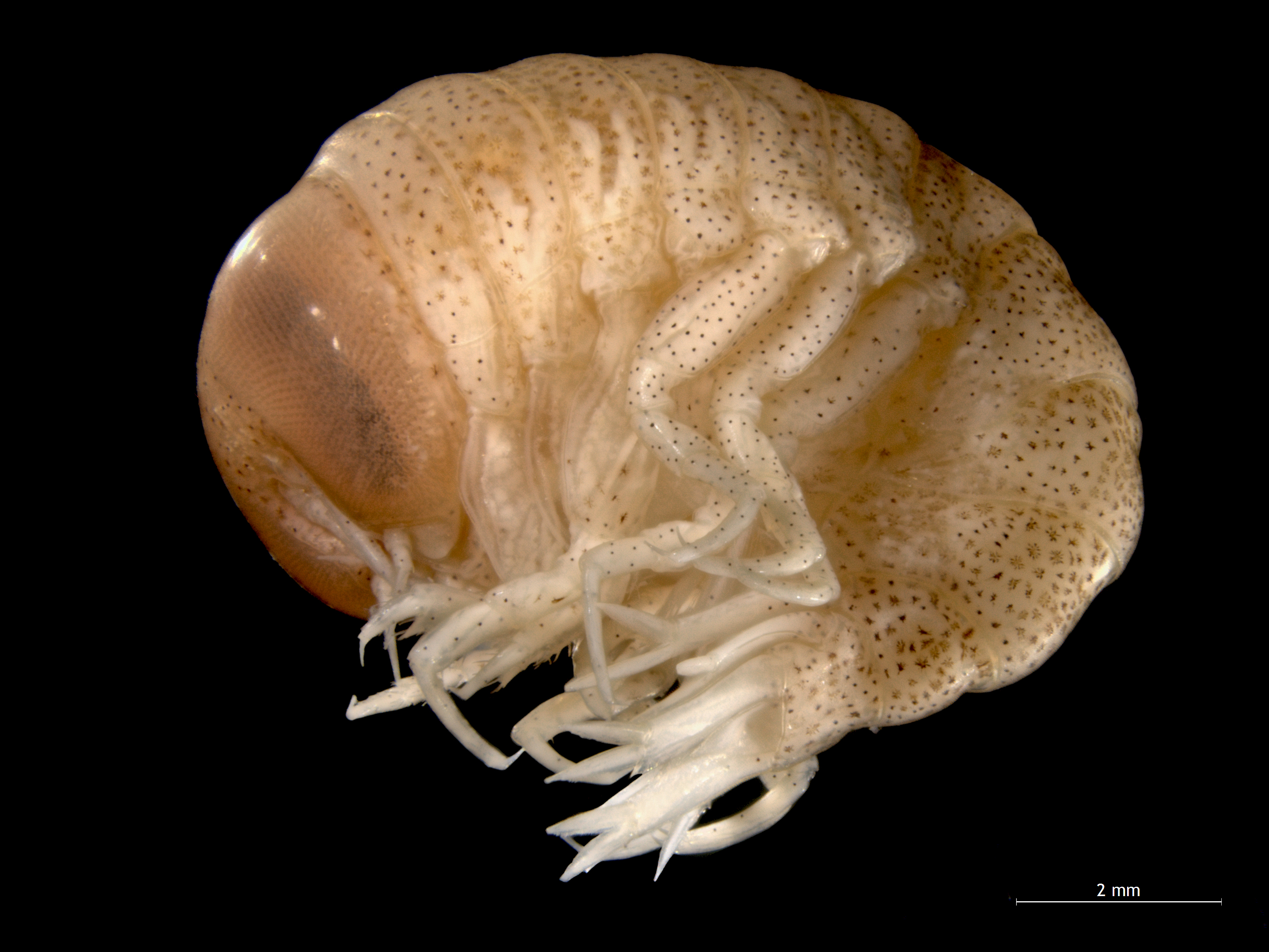
A Hyperia galba that was found to display an obligate parasitic relationship with Desmonema gaudichaudi (White & Bone 1972).

=== Parasitic ===
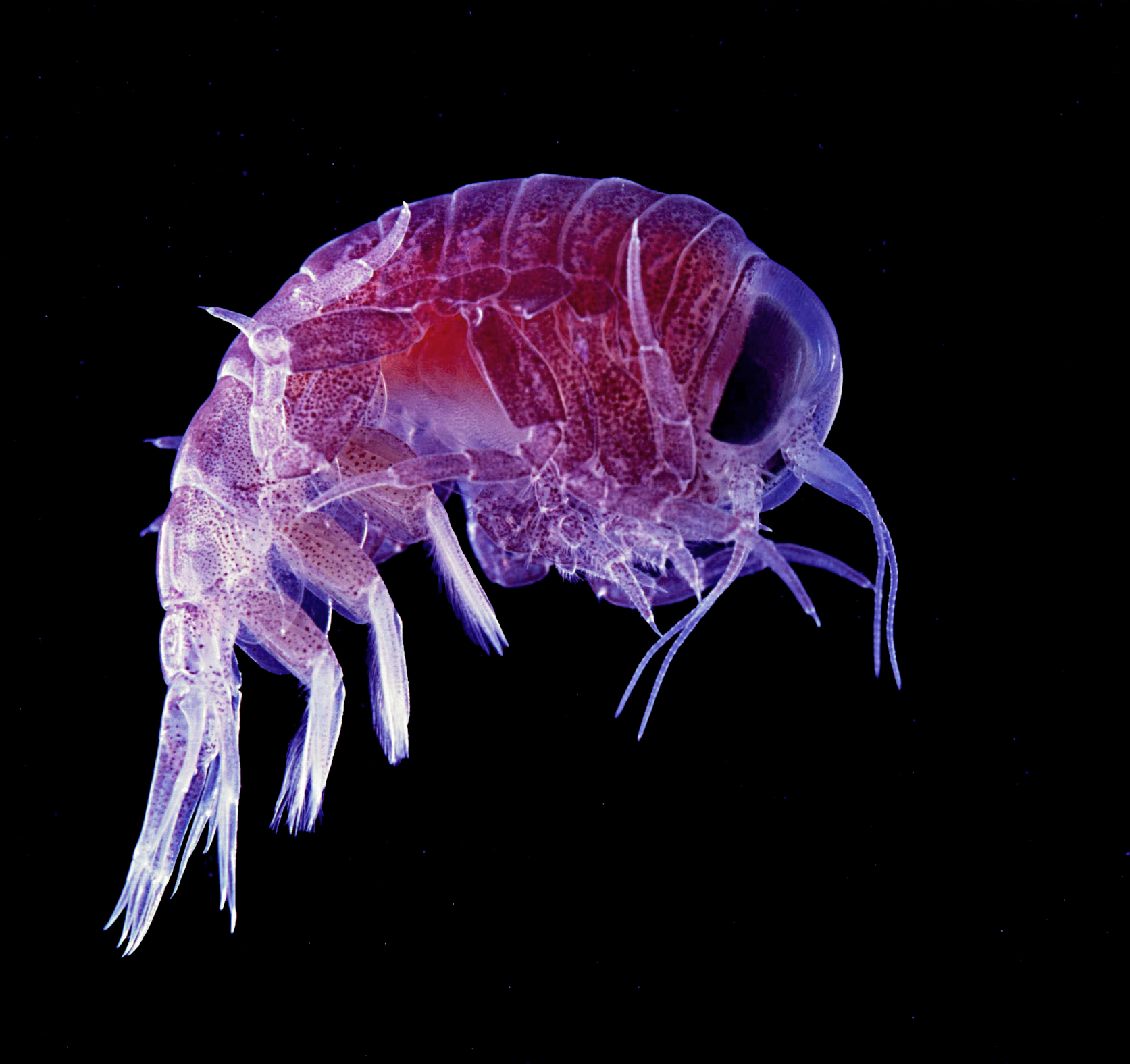
A Hyperia macrocephala that displays an obligate parasitic relationship with Desmonema glaciale (Bowman 1973).

In Signy Island, South Orkney Island, the first link of a parasitic relationship between Hyperia galba and Desmonema gaudichaudi was recorded by White and Bone in 1972. The Hyperia galba species was found inside of the gastrovascular system and on the subumbrella around the mouth of the jellyfish feeding on its epidermal tissues. The presence of the Amphipoda in the gastrovascular system is vital for their early development when they are released. The degree of parasitism varies between populations, but Hyperia galba has been defined as obligate parasites that alternate between endoparasitic and ectoparasitic during different stages of their life cycle. As young, they reside in the gastrovascular system for development and transition into ectoparasites that feed on the epidermal layer of the jellyfish. In 1973, Bowman identified Hyperia macrocephala on the interior of Desmonema glaciale and they displayed similar parasitic behavior as the Hyperia galba on the Desmonema gaudichaudi.

== Species ==
The following comprises a list of the known Desmonema species:

- Desmonema chierchianum (Vanhöffen 1888)
- Desmonema comatum (Larson 1986)
- Desmonema gaudichaudi (Lesson 1832)
- Desmonema glaciale (Larson 1986)
- Desmonema scoresbyanna (Gershwin & Zeidler 2008)

Cyanea rosea was formerly identified as Desmonema rosea by Agassiz and Mayer in 1898. This species was identified in Largs Bay, South Australia as Desmonema rosea, but its tentacle origin and radial muscle strands on the underside of the jellyfish resembles the genus Cyanea rather than Desmonema. It was later changed by Mayer to Cyanea rosea in 1910.
