= Jellyfish of New Zealand =

Jellyfish are a diverse group of gelatinous zooplankton found throughout New Zealand's marine environments, from sheltered bays to open coastal waters. Several native and migratory species inhabit the country's Exclusive Economic Zone, contributing to marine food webs and occasionally impacting human activity through blooms and stings.

New Zealand's position in the temperate South Pacific supports a wide variety of jellyfish species. These organisms, belonging primarily to the phylum Cnidaria, class Scyphozoa (true jellyfish), and class Cubozoa (box jellyfish), are often seasonally abundant and can drift considerable distances due to ocean currents. Some species are native, while others appear periodically due to shifts in currents, climate, and water temperature.

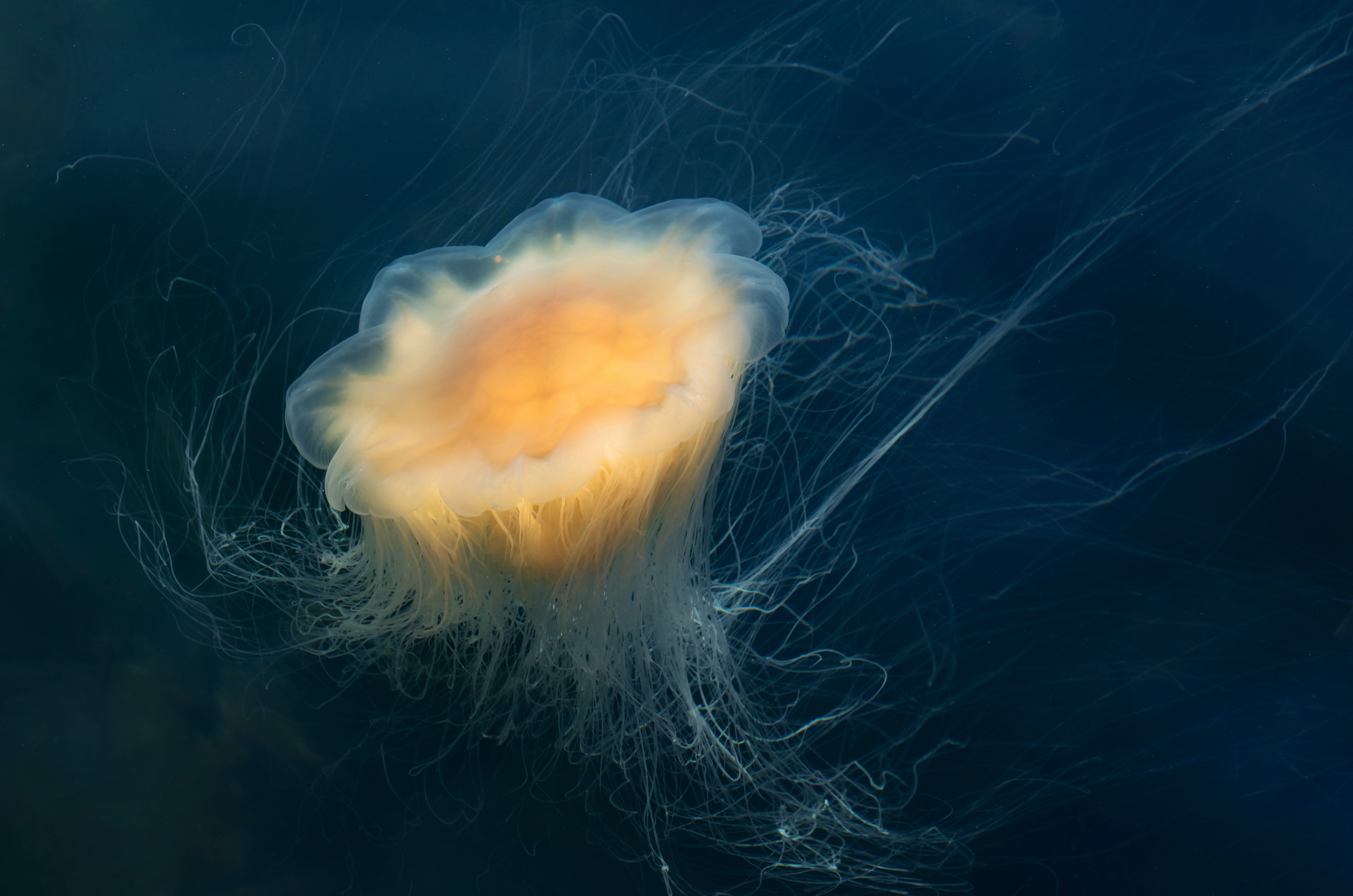
Cyanea capillata
Sweden

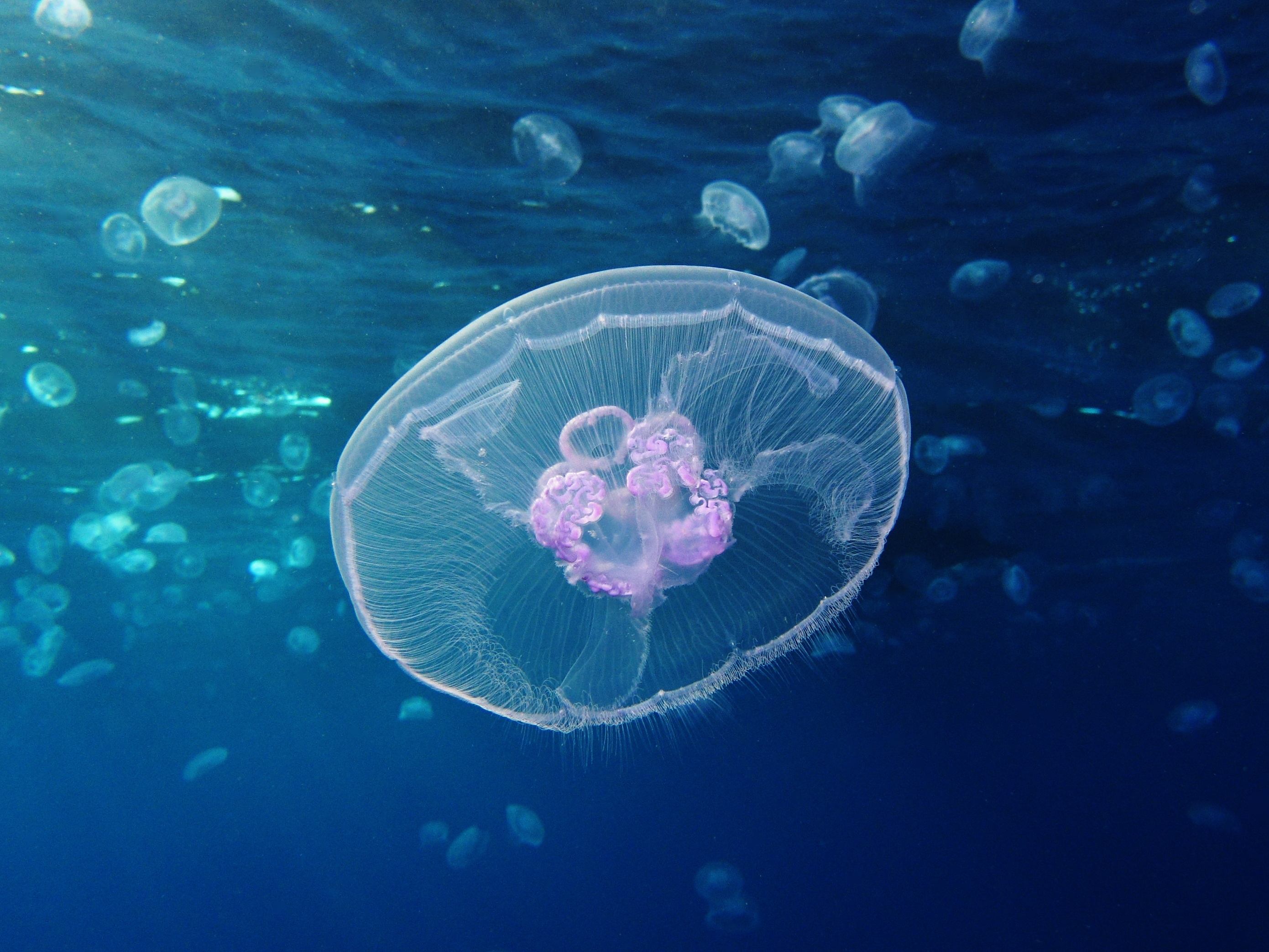
Aurelia aurita
Egypt (Red Sea)

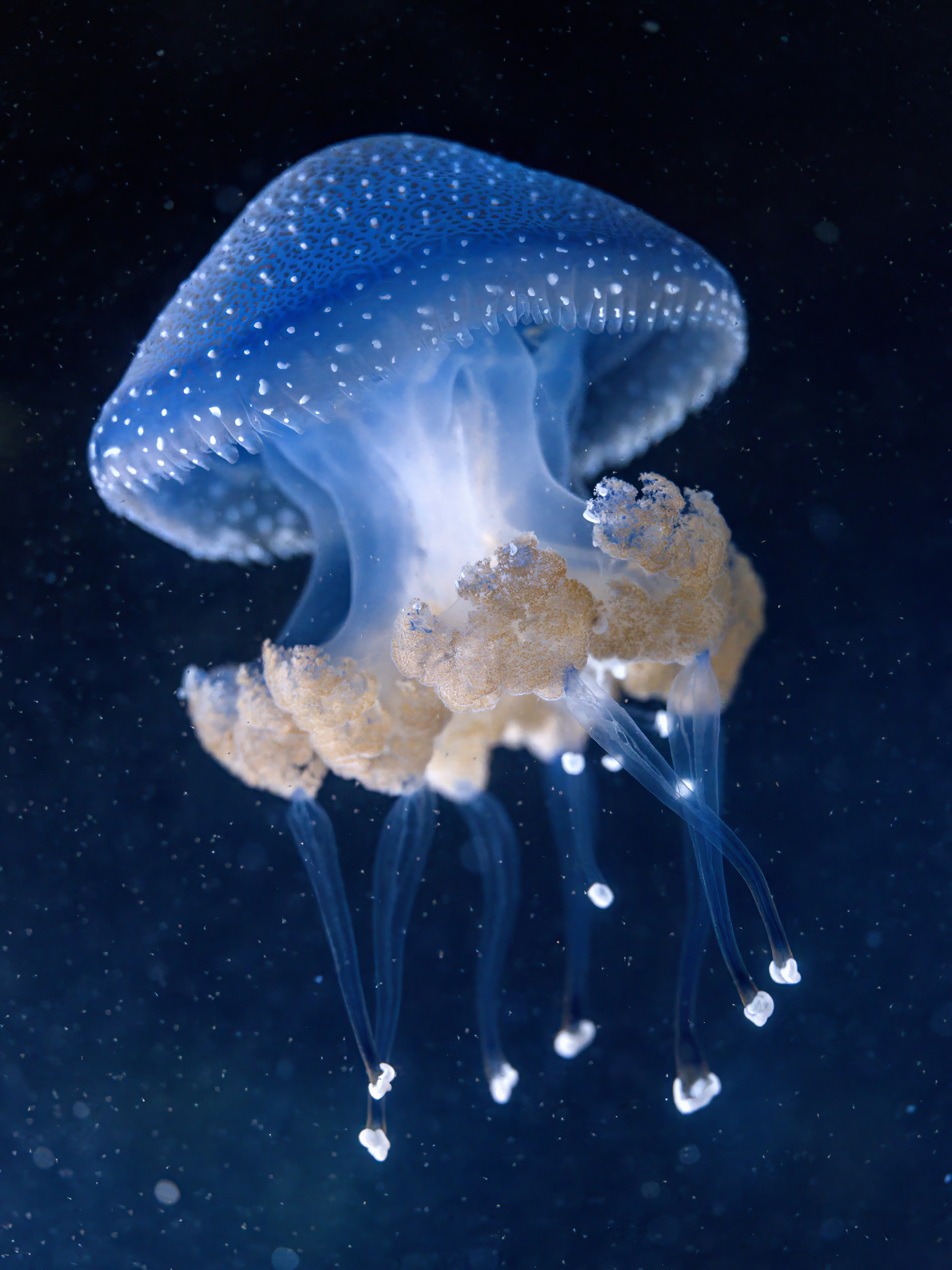
Phyllorhiza puntata
captive bred, France

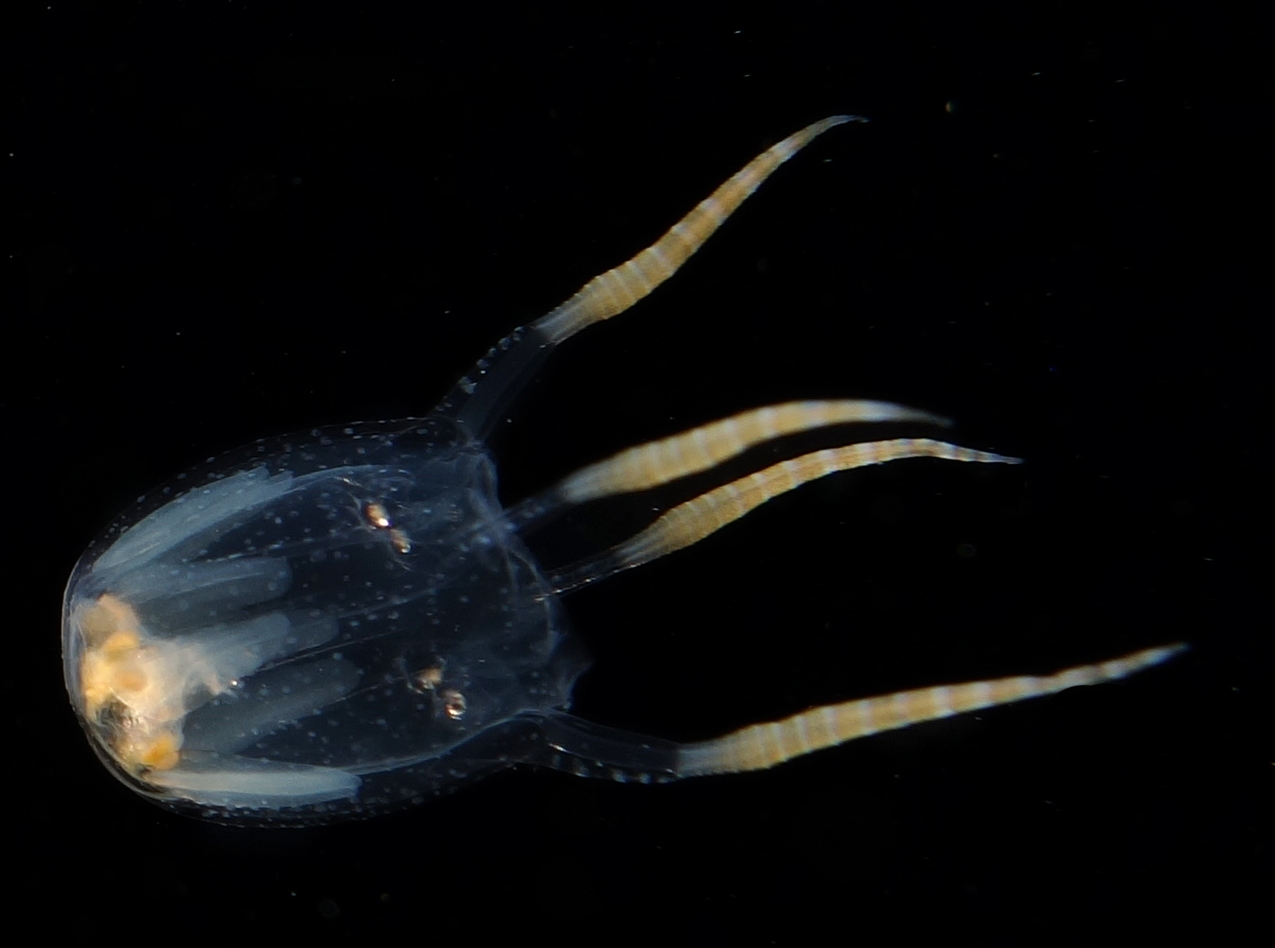
Copula sivickisi
Okinawa, Japan

Desmonema gaudichaudi
Stewart Island, New Zealand

Species list
Common name	Scientific name	Where found	Sting
Lion's mane jellyfish	Cyanea capillata	Cooler southern waters, especially South Island coasts.	Painful, can cause irritation and welts, but not life-threatening.
Southern lion's mane	Cyanea annaskala	Temperate coastal waters, especially around the South Island.	Moderate sting, can cause discomfort.
Pink lion’s mane	Cyanea rosea	Found around the entire coast of New Zealand, as far south as Campbell Island.	Mild sting, rarely harmful to humans.
Moon jellyfish	Aurelia sp.	The commonest true jellyfish species in New Zealand and is found around the entire coastline.	Very mild or harmless to humans
Mauve stinger	Pelagia noctiluca	Usually found in oceanic deep water away from the coast but can swarm in large numbers and drift to the shore in late summer and winter around the northern waters of New Zealand, specifically Northland’s east coast and the Bay of Plenty.	Painful and irritating; can cause rash-like welts
Australian spotted jellyfish	Phyllorhiza punctata	Northern and eastern coastal waters, especially near harbours, blooms observed in Ōrākei Basin during February	Weak sting, usually harmless to humans.
Box jellyfish	Copula sivickisi	Has only been recorded only from Te Whanganui-a-Tara (Wellington Harbour), Wellington's south coast and Kaikōura.	Unlike many other box jellyfish species, this species is not known to be dangerous to humans. The stings are relatively mild, but may leave a blister-like wound.
Speckled jellyfish	Desmonema gaudichaudi	Widespread, recorded in waters around Leigh, the Firth of Thames, Auckland, Bay of Plenty, Wellington, Nelson, Marlborough Sounds, West of Coast South Island, Christchurch, Dunedin, Stewart Island, and is a known cold-water species from the Southern Ocean and Antarctica.	Can cause pain and irritation; not considered highly dangerous
Crimson immortal jellyfish	Turritopsis rubra	Found in shallow coastal waters, recorded from Bream Bay, Hauraki Gulf, Goat Island Marine Reserve, Whangateau Harbour, Waitemata Harbour, Wellington Harbour, Cook Strait, Hawke's Bay and Otago Harbour.	Mild, may cause itchy welts
