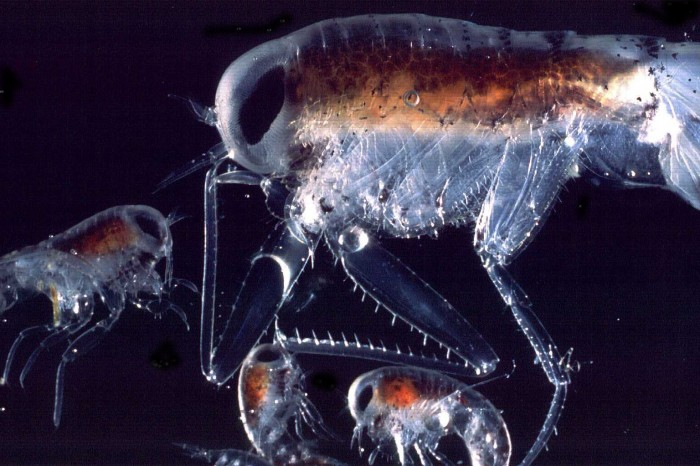

Scientific classification
- Domain: Eukaryota
- Kingdom: Animalia
- Phylum: Arthropoda
- Class: Malacostraca
- Order: Amphipoda
- Suborder: Hyperiidea
- Family: Hyperiidae
- Genus: Themisto
- Species: T. libellula

Binomial name
- Themisto libellula (Lichtenstein in Mandt, 1822)

Synonyms
- Euthemisto libellula (Mandt); Parathemisto libellula (Lichtenstein, 1822)

= Themisto libellula =

Species of crustacean

Themisto libellula is a marine amphipod of the family Hyperiidae. The species lives for 2 to 3 years, and grows up to 60 millimetres (2.4 in) over its lifetime. They are found in large quantities in Arctic water.

In the summer, they eat more lipids to store as fuel for the winter. During the mid-winter, they eat copepods, such as Calanus finmarchicus. T. libellula is eaten by cod, polar cod, and mammals at the ice edge. In the early 2000s, the population of the species began to decrease; these effects rippled through the food chain. The levels later rose in cool years, and T. libellula have moved south of the Arctic Circle. They have been observed in mass mortalities, where millions of T. libellula wash up dead on the coast.
