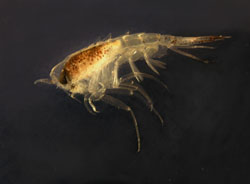

Scientific classification
- Domain: Eukaryota
- Kingdom: Animalia
- Phylum: Arthropoda
- Class: Malacostraca
- Order: Amphipoda
- Suborder: Hyperiidea
- Family: Hyperiidae
- Genus: Themisto
- Species: T. gaudichaudii

Binomial name
- Themisto gaudichaudii Guérin, 1825

Synonyms
- Themisto gaudichaudi Guérin, 1825; Euthemisto thomsoni Stebbing, 1888; Euthemisto gaudichaudii (Guérin, 1825); Parathemisto gaudichaudi (Guérin, 1825); Themisto guerinii Bate, 1863; Euthemisto bispinosa (Boeck, 1871)

= Themisto gaudichaudii =

Species of crustacean

Themisto gaudichaudii is an amphipod crustacean of the suborder Hyperiidea.

== Taxonomic history ==
Themisto gaudichaudii was first described by Félix Édouard Guérin-Méneville in 1825. Since the genus was then monotypic, T. gaudichaudii became the type species of the genus Themisto. The type material was collected "sur les côtes des Îles Malouines" (off the coast of the Falkland Islands).
