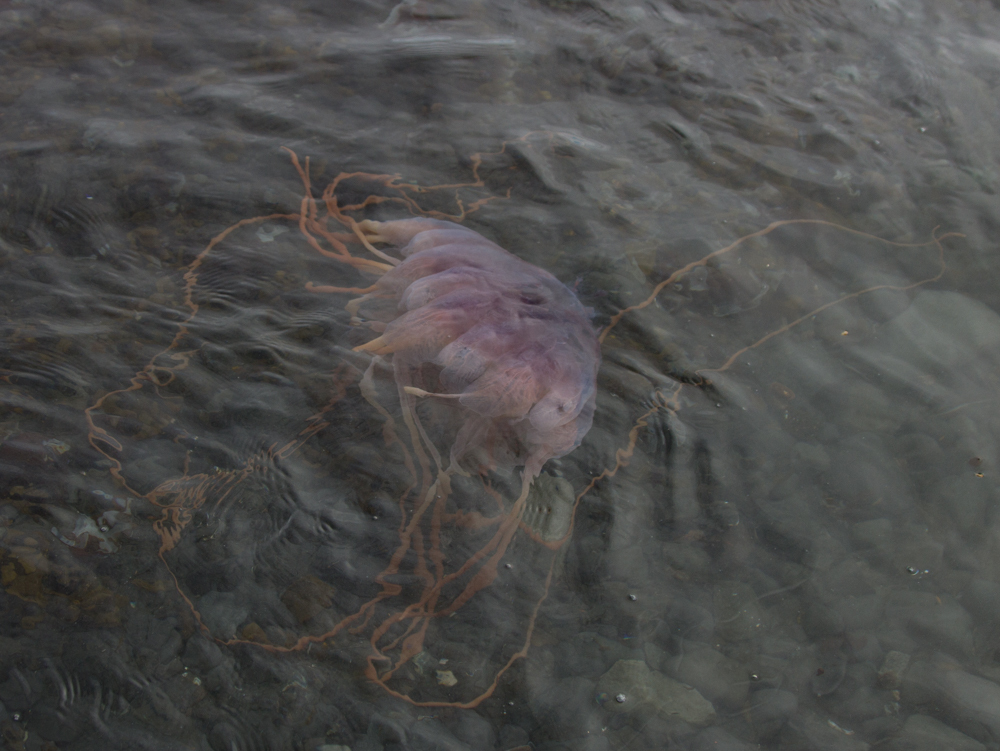
- Desmonema glaciale as seen from the surface

Scientific classification
- Kingdom: Animalia
- Phylum: Cnidaria
- Class: Scyphozoa
- Order: Semaeostomeae
- Family: Cyaneidae
- Genus: Desmonema
- Species: D. glaciale

Binomial name
- Desmonema glaciale Larson, 1986

= Desmonema glaciale =

Species of jellyfish

Desmonema glaciale, known as the Antarctic giant jellyfish, is a species of jellyfish in the family Cyaneidae. The species can be found in the Southern Ocean near the coast of Antarctica, as well as the southwest Atlantic and southeast Pacific. The species Hyperia macrocephala has been found living inside the jellyfish.

== Distribution ==
Desmonema glaciale are found in southern waters, particularly the Southern Ocean around Antarctica, as well as the southeast of the Atlantic Ocean and the southwest of the Pacific Ocean. It is also found around the Antarctic Peninsula, the South Orkney Islands, the South Shetland Islands, and South Georgia. It has also been found off the coast of Chile and in the Tasman Sea.

Desmonema glaciale typically live within a meter of the surface.

== Description ==
The umbrella of Desmonema glaciale can up to 1.2 metres (3.9 ft) wide in diameter, which is one of the distinguishing features of the species. Its color is pink-violet. Desmonema glaciale are also distinguished from other Desmonema species by their batches of up to 10 cordlike tentacles, which can reach up to 5 metres (16 ft) in length.

While within their ephyra stage, Desmonema glaciale are 12.2 millimetres (0.48 in) in diameter. It also has four tentacles, four tentacular buds, and a smooth umbrella.

== Behavior and reproduction ==
Desmonema glaciale feeds on diverse pelagic and benthic organisms including fish. They also feed on krill, plankton, starfishes, and worms.

As a member of the class Scyphozoa, Desmonema glaciale are gonochoric. Eggs are laid by the adult medusa which later develops into a free-living Planula, then to a scyphistoma, to a strobila, and lastly to a free-living young medusa.

In June 2026, a Desmonema glaciale found in the Bransfield Basin was described in its ephyra stage was described for the first time.

=== Symbiosis with Hyperia macrocephala ===
Juvenile Hyperia macrocephala are known to feed in the gastrovascular system of Desmonema glaciale. As adults, Hyperia macrocephala feed on its epidermis.
