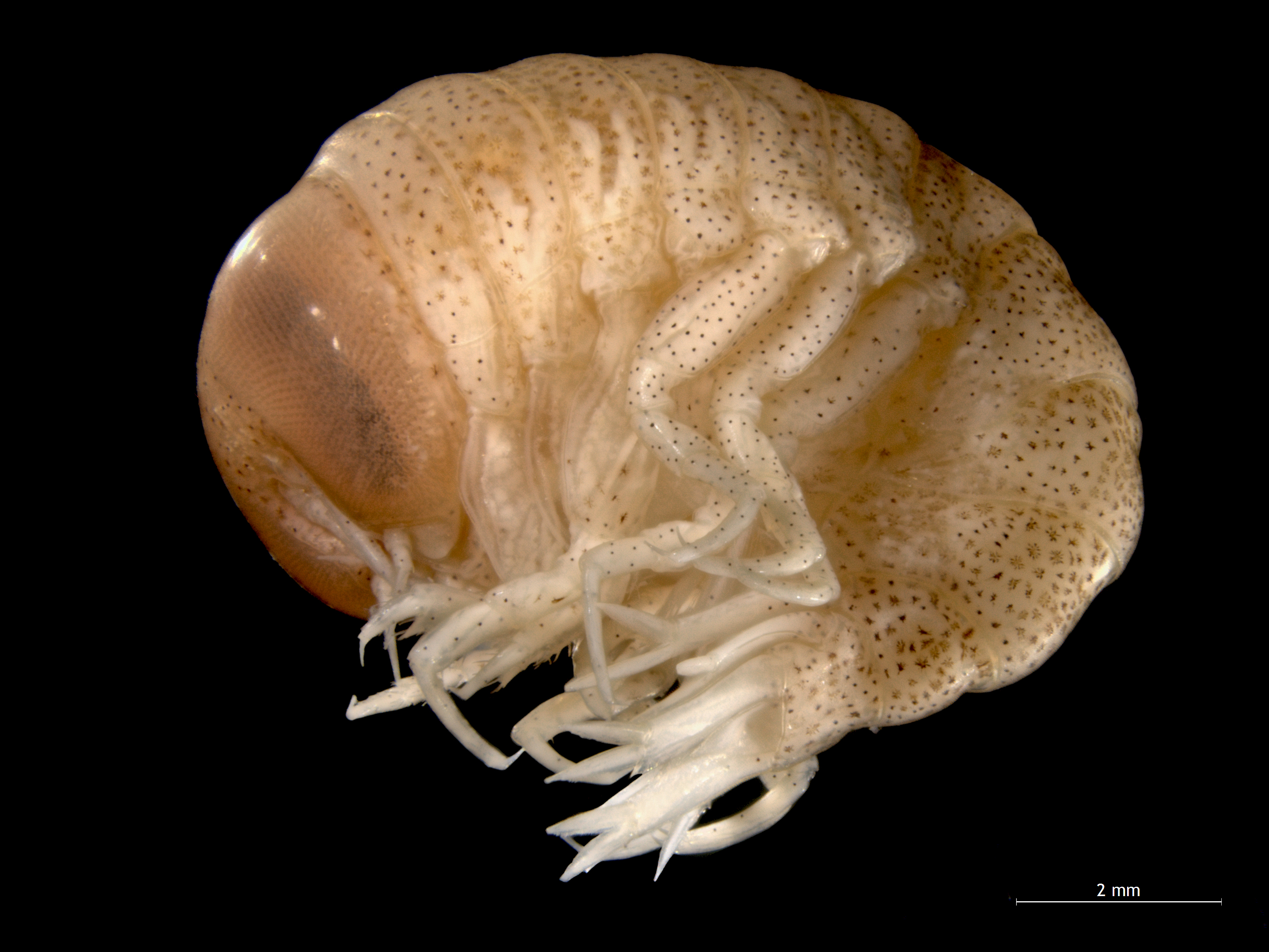

Scientific classification
- Kingdom: Animalia
- Phylum: Arthropoda
- Clade: Pancrustacea
- Class: Malacostraca
- Order: Amphipoda
- Family: Hyperiidae
- Genus: Hyperia
- Species: H. galba

Binomial name
- Hyperia galba (Montagu, 1815)

Synonyms
- Hyperia latreille Milne-Edwards

= Hyperia galba =

Species of crustacean

Hyperia galba is a species of zooplankton, an amphipod in the family Hyperiidae.

== Description ==
This species grows to 1.2 cm and has a rotund body shape which is translucent and has a light brown colour. One of the most prominent features of this species is the very large, green eyes. These occupy the entire sides of the head, which is short and rounded. Both the head and thorax are more plump than the abdomen, especially in females. The gnathopods are simple. It has filiform antennae which are very short in females and long in males. It has a laterally and dorsally rounded pereion which is deep and slightly laterally compressed.

== Distribution ==
Hyperia galba is very widespread in the North Sea.

== Habitat ==
This species lives among jellyfish including those in the genera Rhizostoma and Aurelia, as well as others within the class scyphozoa.
