= Cyanea citrea =

Scientific classification
- Kingdom: Animalia
- Phylum: Cnidaria
- Class: Scyphozoa
- Order: Semaeostomeae
- Family: Cyaneidae
- Genus: Cyanea
- Species: C. citrea

Binomial name
- Cyanea citrea Kishinouye, 1910

Species of jellyfish

Cyanea citrea is a species of true jellyfish in the family Cyaneidae. It has been found in waters off the coasts of Japan and Russia. The generic name, Cyanea, is derived from the Latin cyaneus, meaning "deep or dark blue in color". The specific epithet, citrea, is derived from the Latin citreus, meaning "citrus", likely in reference to the species' orange color.

== Description ==
The bell of Cyanea citrea is flat and disc-shaped, and thickens in its center. The bell is about 30 centimetres (12 in) in diameter, and is a deep orange color. The margin of the bell is made up of 32 rounded lobes. Its oral arms are narrow at their tips, but thicken towards the middle before narrowing out once again as they approach the body. The oral arms are a light orange-brown color. The species' tentacles are grouped in eight U-shaped tracts, and are a reddish color at parts distanced from the body. Male genital glands are a light orange-yellow color, while those of females are a dark yellow-brown.
