= Desmonema scoresbyanna =

Scientific classification
- Kingdom: Animalia
- Phylum: Cnidaria
- Class: Scyphozoa
- Order: Semaeostomeae
- Family: Cyaneidae
- Genus: Desmonema
- Species: D. scoresbyanna

Binomial name
- Desmonema scoresbyanna Gershwin & Zeidler, 2008

Species of jellyfish

Desmonema scoresbyanna is a species of jellyfish in the family Cyaneidae. It occurs on the coast of southern Australia (South Australia and New South Wales).

== Description ==
Its bell is flat but slightly thicker at the center. Tentacles cluster in groups of 12–16 but typically 15. The species differs from other species with its canals of lappets being unbranched and present only in tentacular lappets.

== Etymology ==
It was named in honor of Dr. Scoresby A. Shepherd for inspiring many marine biologist and natural historians. He also caught many specimens of Australian species of medusae including this species.
