= Cyanea purpurea =

Scientific classification
- Kingdom: Animalia
- Phylum: Cnidaria
- Class: Scyphozoa
- Order: Semaeostomeae
- Family: Cyaneidae
- Genus: Cyanea
- Species: C. purpurea

Binomial name
- Cyanea purpurea Kishinouye, 1910

Species of jellyfish

Cyanea purpurea is a species of true jellyfish in the family Cyaneidae. It has been recorded off Sakhalin and the cost of China. The generic name, Cyanea, is derived from the Latin cyaneus, meaning "deep or dark blue in color", and the specific epithet, purpurea, is derived from the Latin purpureus, meaning "purple", in reference to its violet color.

== Description ==
Cyanea purpurea has a disc-shaped bell around 36 centimetres (14 in) in diameter. The bell has a violet color. The margin of the bell consists of 16 broad lobes. Its tentacles are grouped into eight tracts. The oral arms of the species are a reddish color.
