= Scoresby Shepherd =

Australian lawyer and marine biologist (1935–2025)

Scoresby Shepherd AO
- Born: 22 January 1935; Port Lincoln, South Australia
- Died: 15 May 2025 (aged 90); Adelaide, South Australia
- Occupations: Marine biologist, lawyer
- Known for: Study of abalone populations and conservation efforts
- Notable work: Abalone of the World
- Spouse: Anna
- Children: 3
- Awards: Officer of the Order of Australia

Scoresby Shepherd (22 January 1935 – 15 May 2025) was an Australian lawyer and a researcher. He had a 50-year career in marine biology and became a global authority on aspects of marine biology. He led expeditions to study abalone population across the world to assess threats to them and reform abalone fishing in areas. He also received many awards and honours including Officer of the Order of Australia for service in marine science, particularly in abalone biology and ecology.

== Life and career ==
Shepherd's career as a marine biologist was inspired by the French diver and adventurer Jacques-Yves Cousteau. In the 1950s, he worked towards a career in law and became a lawyer in the 1960s. In the 1960s, he became the Department of Fisheries and Fauna Conservation expert biology of marine species where he constructed a foundation for a sustainable abalone fishery. Between 1963 and 1968, Shepherd volunteered for a geological survey of Gulf St. Vincent, off Adelaide. After more than 500 dives, he helped produce a detailed map of life in the areas sea floor which is still used and referenced today. In 1971, he wrote the legislation that would become the Fisheries act and its marine parks in Southern Australia.

The jellyfish, Desmonema scoresbyanna, is named in his honour.

Shepherd died on 15 May 2025, at the age of 90. His widow, Anna, is a linguist.

== Publications ==
Shepherd wrote over 100 publications on ResearchGate. His book publications include:

- Shepherd, S. A.; Tegner, Mia J.; Guzman del Proo, S. A., eds. (1992). Abalone of the world: biology, fisheries and culture. Oxford: Wiley. ISBN 978-0-85238-181-6.
- Shepherd, Scoresby A. Paradise Is Underwater : Memoir of a Marine Biologist. Mermaid Waters: Zeus Publications. ISBN 978-0-99440-842-6.
- Mosley, Luke; Hemming, S. J.; Fitzpatrick, R. W.; Shepherd, S. A.; Qifeng, Yi, eds. (2018). Natural history of the Coorong, Lower Lakes, and Murray Mouth Region (Yarluwar-Ruwe). University of Adelaide Press. ISBN 978-1-92526-180-6.
