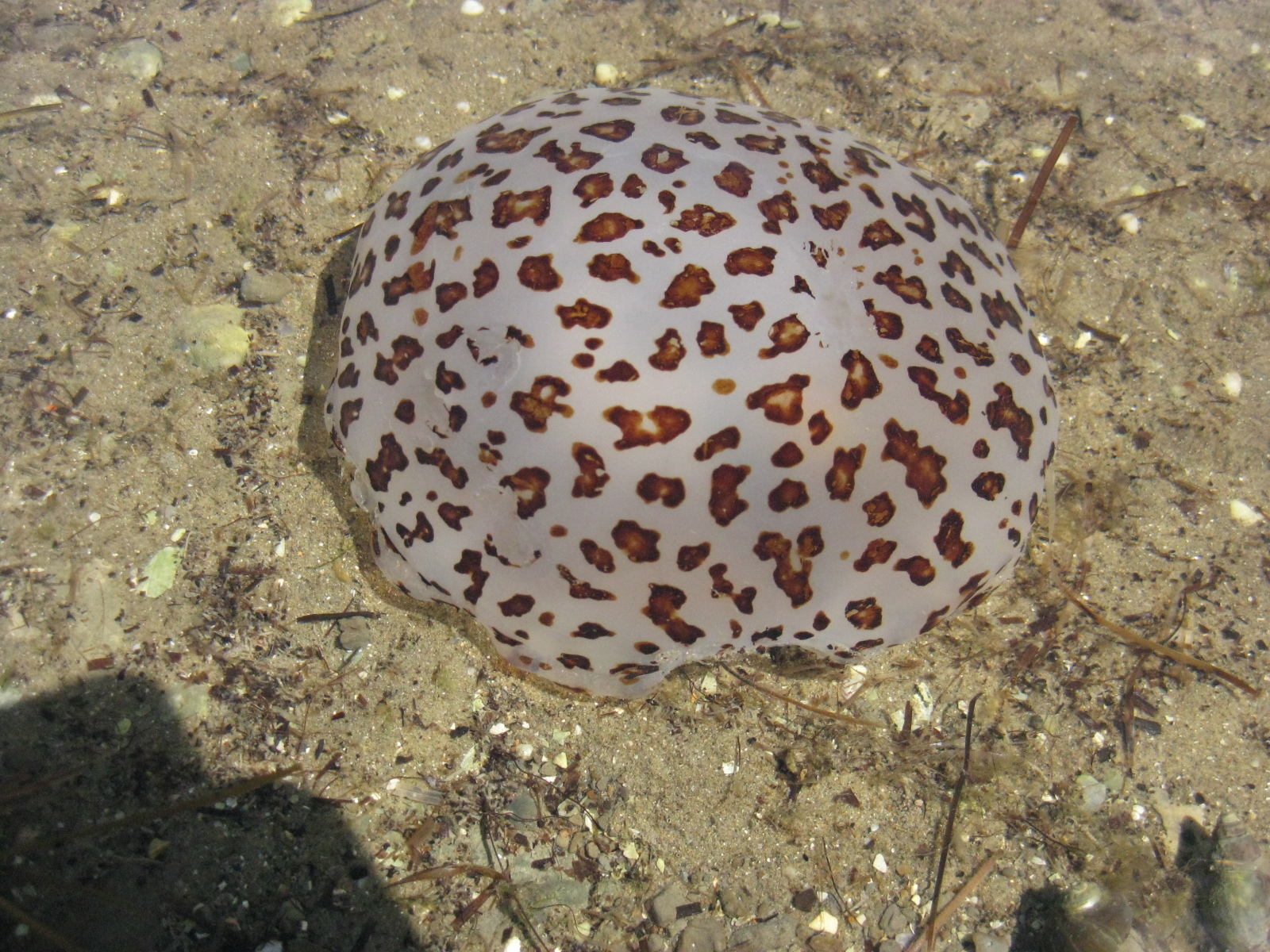

Scientific classification
- Kingdom: Animalia
- Phylum: Cnidaria
- Class: Scyphozoa
- Order: Semaeostomeae
- Family: Cyaneidae
- Genus: Desmonema
- Species: D. gaudichaudi

Binomial name
- Desmonema gaudichaudi Lesson, 1829

Synonyms
- Chrysaora gaudichaudi Lesson, 1830; Desmonema chierchiana Vanhöffen, 1888; Desmonema chierchianum Vanhöffen, 1888

= Desmonema gaudichaudi =

Species of jellyfish

Desmonema gaudichaudi, the spotted jellyfish, is a species of visually striking jellyfish belonging to the family Cyaneidae. It is known for its broad, often spotted bell and its presence in subantarctic and temperate waters of the Southern Hemisphere. The species was first described by the French naturalist René Lesson in 1830.

== Description ==
Desmonema gaudichaudi is characterised by a bell that typically measures 10-20 cm in diameter, though specimens up to 50 cm across have been recorded. Bell coloration is variable, ranging from pale hues with dark spots to uniformly maroon, brown, or violet shades. The margin of the bell bears 32 lobes (lappets), with tentacle clusters that usually consist of five to seven tentacles arranged in a single row.

Internally, the species displays a few broad radial canals branching from the stomach to the bell margin, with lateral canals often exhibiting unilateral branching. It also features four long oral arms used for prey capture and transport to the central mouth.

== Distribution and habitat ==
at Stewart Island, New Zealand

This species is found mainly in colder waters, such as

- Coastal waters around New Zealand
- Coastal waters around Australia (Coffs Harbour to Cape Tribulation)

This species is consistently found throughout New Zealand, and is one of the most common jellyfish of New Zealand. Although uncommon, vagrants have been spotted in Australia, going as far north as Cape Tribulation.

== Significance ==
Blooms of Desmonema gaudichaudi may occur seasonally and have ecological implications for local marine food webs. While generally harmless to humans, contact with the tentacles can cause irritation or mild stings. Due to their size and visibility, these jellyfish often attract public attention when washed ashore or seen in swarms near harbours.
