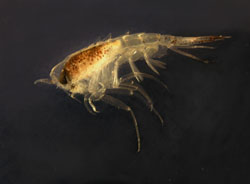
- Themisto gaudichaudii, the type species

Scientific classification
- Kingdom: Animalia
- Phylum: Arthropoda
- Clade: Pancrustacea
- Class: Malacostraca
- Order: Amphipoda
- Family: Hyperiidae
- Genus: Themisto; Guérin, 1825

Synonyms
- Euthemisto Bovallius, 1887; Parathemisto Boeck, 1870

= Themisto (crustacean) =

Genus of crustaceans

Themisto is a genus of marine amphipods in the family Hyperiidae. Their distribution is cosmopolitan.

== Ecological role ==
Themisto are obligate carnivores. Themisto gaudichaudii has been found to feed opportunistically on copepods and chaetognaths, as juveniles also on diatoms.

Themisto are important prey in many food webs. For example, Themisto gaudichaudii reaches high densities (up to 61 individuals/m^{3}) in Kerguelen waters and is a major food item for blue petrels, thin-billed prions, Antarctic prions, common diving petrels, and southern rockhopper penguins. In the Barents Sea, Themisto libellula is very abundant in the Arctic waters and important food item for cod, polar cod, and marine mammals near the ice edge, whereas Themisto abyssorum is important in Atlantic/boreal waters.

== Life history ==
Themisto gaudichaudii matures at lengths between 6 and 12 mm (0.24 and 0.47 in) or more. Reproduction can be nearly continuous but becomes more seasonal at higher latitudes. The offspring emerging from the marsupium are 2–3 mm (0.079–0.118 in) in length. Themisto abyssorum has a life span of 1–2 years and reaches a maximum length of 18 mm (0.71 in). Themisto libellula lives 2–3 years and grows to a maximum length of 31 mm (1.2 in).

== Species ==
There are seven recognized species:

- Themisto abyssorum (Boeck, 1870)
- Themisto australis (Stebbing, 1888)
- Themisto compressa Goës, 1865
- Themisto gaudichaudii Guérin, 1825
- Themisto japonica (Bovallius, 1887)
- Themisto libellula (Lichtenstein in Mandt, 1822)
- Themisto pacifica (Stebbing, 1888)
