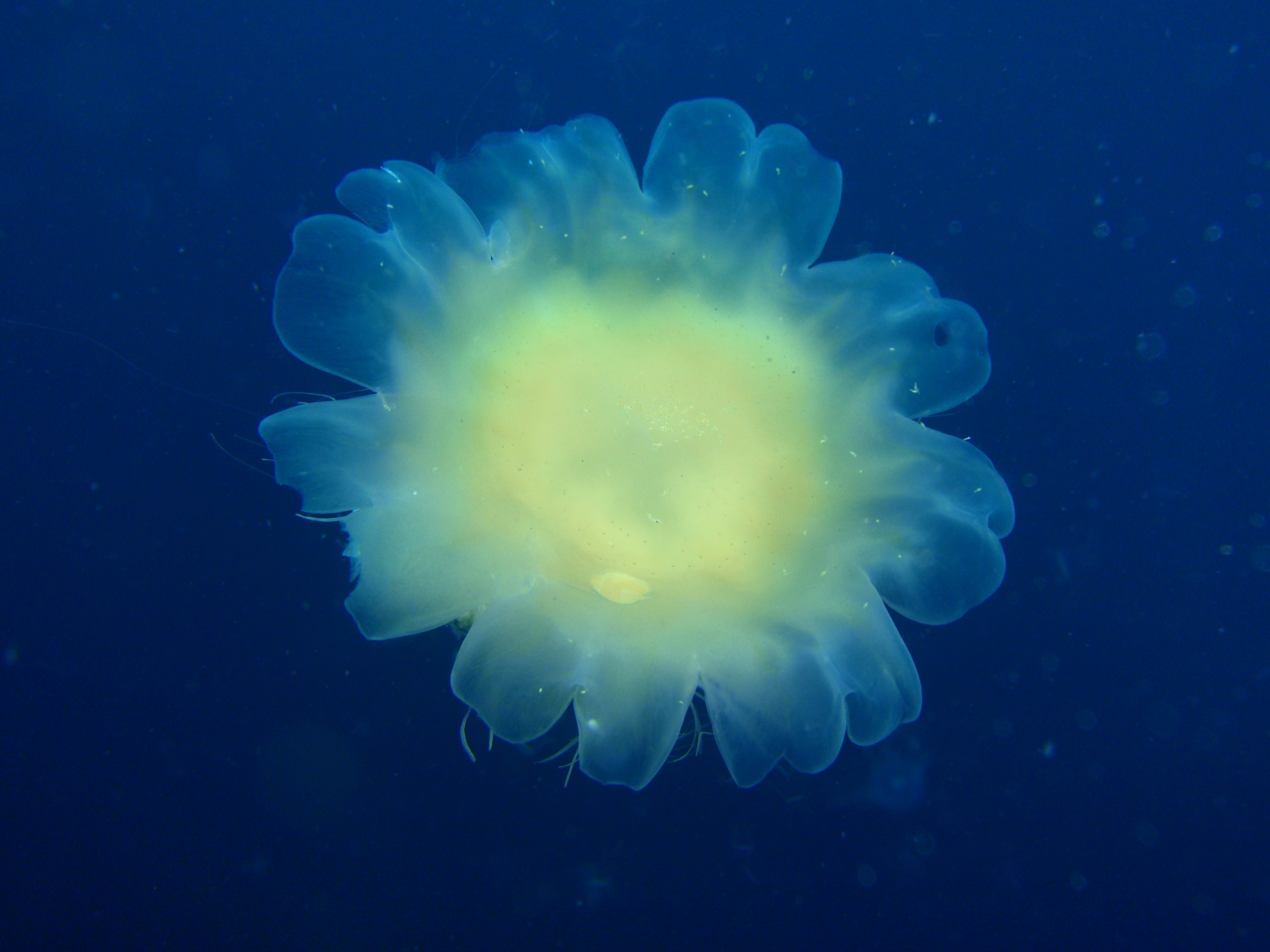

Scientific classification
- Kingdom: Animalia
- Phylum: Cnidaria
- Class: Scyphozoa
- Order: Semaeostomeae
- Family: Cyaneidae
- Genus: Cyanea
- Species: C. annaskala

Binomial name
- Cyanea annaskala von Lendenfeld, 1884

= Cyanea annaskala =

Species of jellyfish

Cyanea annaskala is a species of jellyfish that was discovered in 1882 by Robert Lendlmayer von Lendenfeld.

== Phylogeny ==
Cyanea annaskala is in the scyphozoan class of the phylum Cnidaria. The scyphozoans are the true jellies. It is within the order Semaeostomeae. The Semaeostomeae are the flag mouth jellies. It is within the family Cyaneidae, which contain the better known species of the lion's mane jellyfish.

The phylogeny of the Lion's mane jellyfish has long been debated since their discovery, and the Cyanea annaskala has long been implicated in this difficulty. The high proportion of cosmopolitan species in pelagic individuals makes it extremely tedious to differentiate between closely related members. Because of limited study and challenging experimentation, not all of the Cyanea species from the North Atlantic are considered valid.

Protein and medusae analysis from Michael N. Dawson of the University of New South Wales confirm that Cyanea annaskala is a valid species, morphologically distinct based on differences in bell mass, number of nematocyst clusters, pits in coronal muscle folds, and other morphological characteristics. Some of the other morphological characteristics that have been compared include the number of coronal and radial muscle folds, and the depth of primary and secondary marginal clefts. The distinguishing of C. annaskala from C. capillata and C. rosea is justified as robust based on these criteria. There are two subspecies which include C. annaskala purpurea and C. annaskala margarina. These are located in Port Phillip and Port Jackson respectively.C. a. purpurea is purple completerly whereas C. a. margarina is only purple at the margin.

== Morphology and ecology ==
The bell of the Cyanea annaskala has 8 lobes, all of which have a central cleft. A distinguishing characteristic is the purple coloration of the arms that runs length wise throughout. The bell width is usually between 25 cm and 1 m Their oral arms usually have a base that is not thickened, between 17-24 shallow coronal muscle folds, and no pits in their muscle folds

Cyanea annaskala are endemic to the waters of South Eastern Australia, spanning depths from shallow waters close to the shore to 20 m below the surface. They are in particularly high concentration in Port Philip Bay in Victoria and Port Jackson in Sydney, New South Wales.

They are carnivorous and eat small fish and crustaceans. They will often dive downwards to fan out their tentacles to increase surface area and consequently their chances of catching prey. Being cnidarians, they do possess distinctive harpoon-like injection stinging cells, and like many scyphozoans their populations get out of control. They will occasionally wash ashore and cause minor stings to beachgoers.

During the summer of 1950 and 1961, 4 young men were stung in the eyes while swimming in Port Phillip Bay during a C. annaskala infestation. They experienced severe pain, swelling, and temporary visual deterioration. They also experienced photophobia and blepharospasm. Corneal epithelium suffered abrasions and stroma were punctured. There was also an infestation during the 1997-1998 summer and swimmers were warned to stay out of the waters by the Victorian Environmental Protection Authority after hundreds of reported stingings. These blooms can be quite destructive to the trophic structure of the surrounding environment.

== Reproduction ==
The gonads of the C. annaskala have been described as folded into a ribbon in a genital band. The stretched out gonadial ribbon reached 300 mm. Epithelial cavities will make chambers which fuse to become a genital sinus. Spermatozoa are formed in follicles which stay connected to the genital sinus, providing a conduit for the spermatozoa to travel. The fertilized egg becomes a polyp which is produced through the process of budding (strobilation). The polyp like stage (known as a scyphistoma) of development starts out as a coronate scyphistoma. It then becomes a semaeostome, followed by a rhizostome scyphistoma.

== Research ==
Many efforts to understand the potent toxicity of the Cyanea sting have spanned the realm of biochemical technique. Researchers have elucidated that tentacle extract, essentially essence of tentacle exhibits hemolytic and cardiovascular toxicity simultaneously. Research also shows that pouring saltwater into stings significantly increases flow of venom into body.
