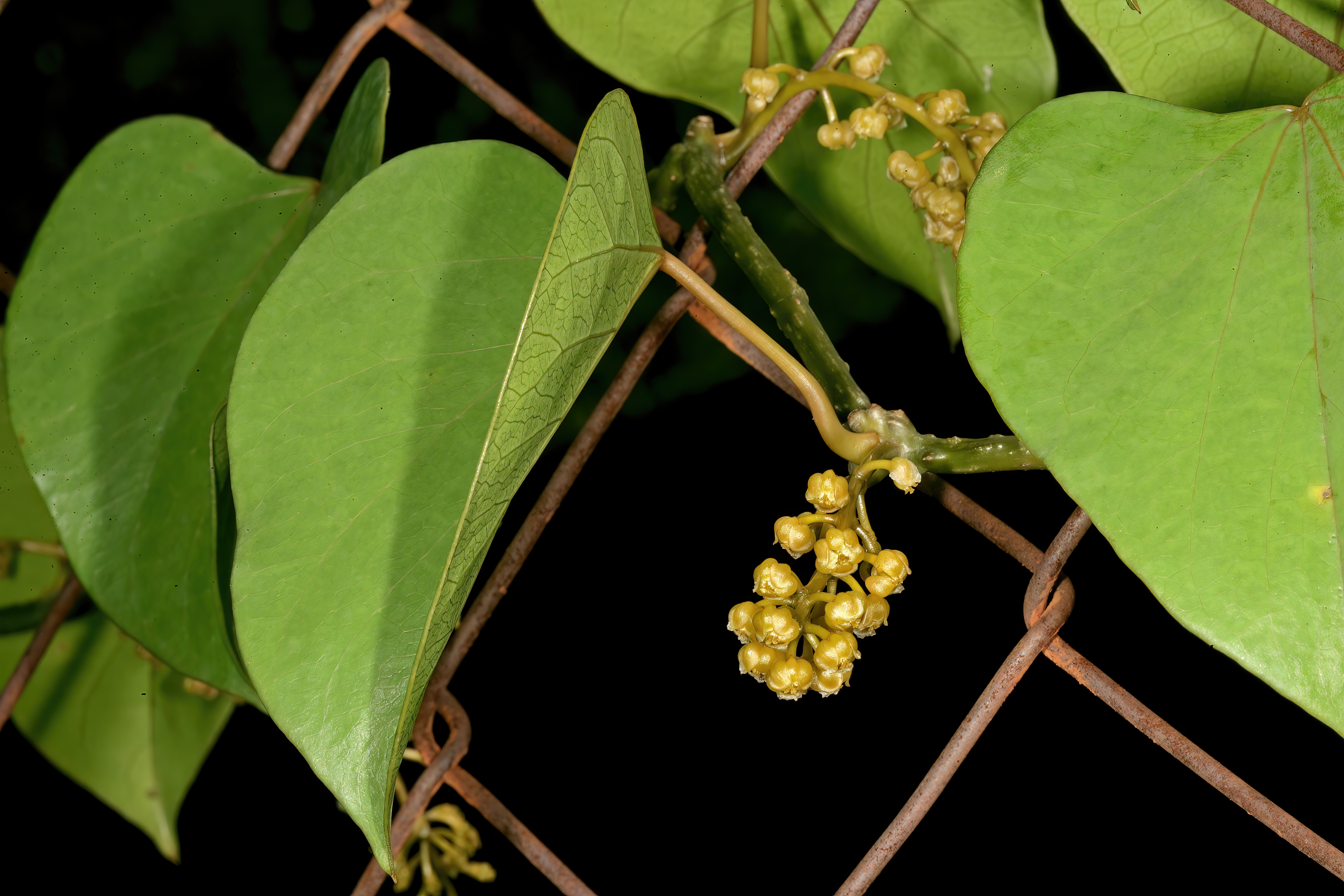
- Hyalosepalum afrum

Scientific classification
- Kingdom: Plantae
- Clade: Tracheophytes
- Clade: Angiosperms
- Clade: Eudicots
- Order: Ranunculales
- Family: Menispermaceae
- Genus: Hyalosepalum; Troupin

Species
- Hyalosepalum afrum (Miers) Troupin; Hyalosepalum mossambicense (Engl.) Troupin; Hyalosepalum oblongifolium (Engl.) Troupin; Hyalosepalum penninervifolium Troupin; Hyalosepalum scytophyllum (Diels) Troupin

Synonyms
- Desmonema Miers nom. illeg.

= Hyalosepalum =

Genus of plants

Hyalosepalum is a genus of flowering plants belonging to the family Menispermaceae.

Its native range is Tropical and Southern Africa and Madagascar.
