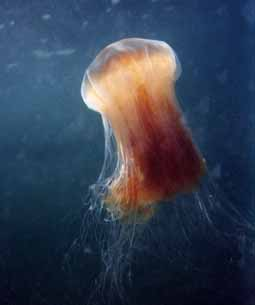
- Lion's mane jellyfish (Cyanea capillata)
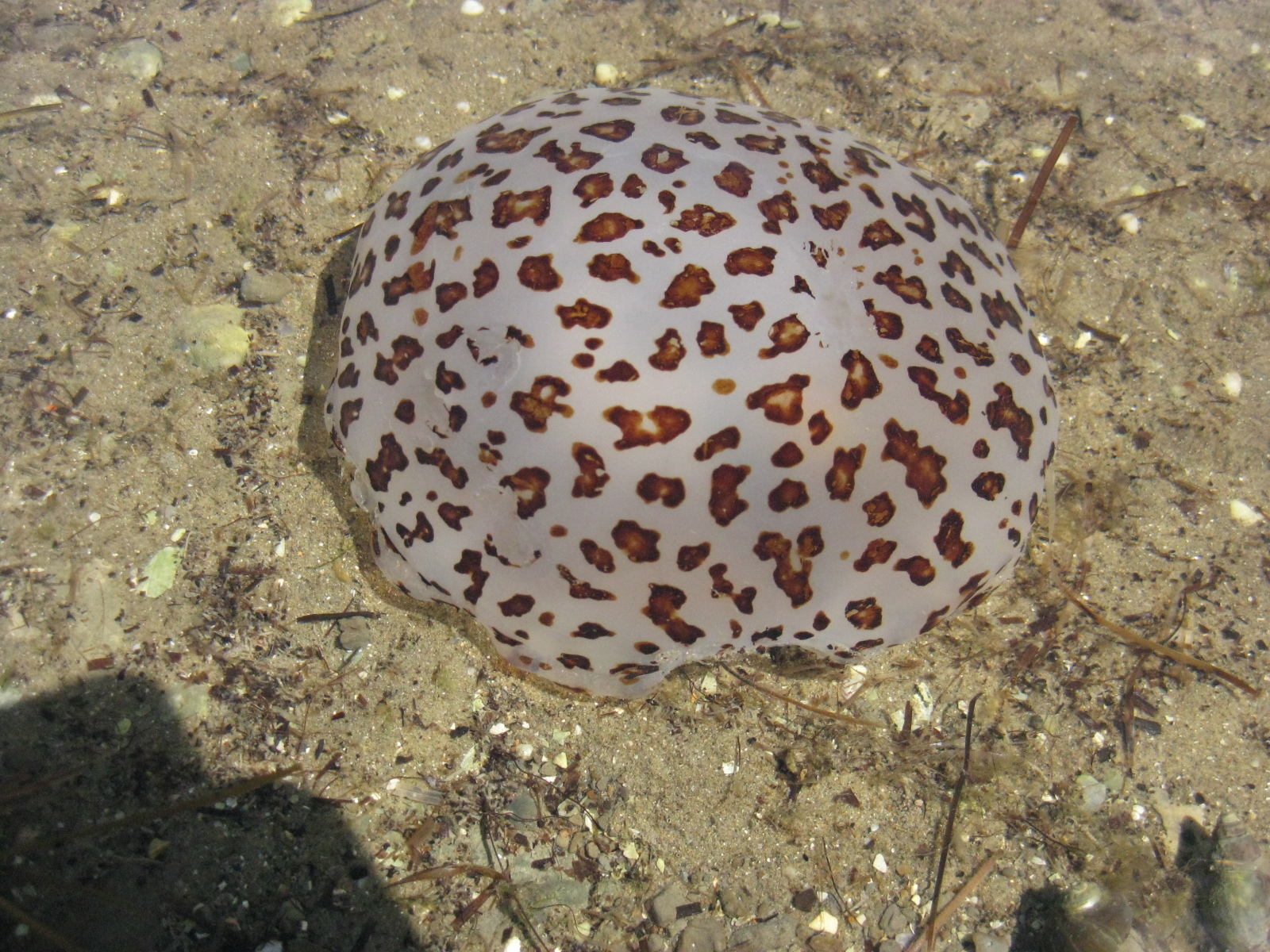
- Desmonema gaudichaudi

Scientific classification
- Kingdom: Animalia
- Phylum: Cnidaria
- Class: Scyphozoa
- Order: Semaeostomeae
- Family: Cyaneidae; L. Agassiz, 1862

Genera
- Cyanea; Desmonema

= Cyaneidae =

Family of jellyfish

The Cyaneidae are a family of true jellyfish. About 20 species are in this family, including the well-known lion's-mane jellyfish.

== Species ==
The following species are recognized within the family Cyaneidae. Formerly, this family also included the genus Drymonema. The Cyaneidae species do not possess any internal organs, ganglia, or any other nerve cells. They do, however, possess gap junctions between neurons which allow for complex reactive behavior and swimming actions.

- Genus Cyanea Péron & Lesueur, 1810
  - Cyanea annaskala von Lendenfeld, 1884
  - Cyanea buitendijki Stiasny, 1919
  - Cyanea capillata (Linnaeus, 1758)
  - Cyanea citrea (Kishinouye, 1910)
  - Cyanea ferruginea Eschscholtz, 1929
  - Cyanea lamarckii Péron & Lesueur, 1809
  - Cyanea nozakii Kishinouye, 1891
  - Cyanea postelsi Brandt, 1838
  - Cyanea purpurea Kishinouye, 1910
  - Cyanea rosea Quoy & Gaimard 1824
- Genus Desmonema L. Agassiz, 1862
  - Desmonema chierchianum Vanhöffen 1888
  - Desmonema comatum Larson 1986
  - Desmonema gaudichaudi (Lesson 1832)
  - Desmonema glaciale Larson 1986
  - Desmonema scoresbyanna Gershwin & Zeidler 2008
