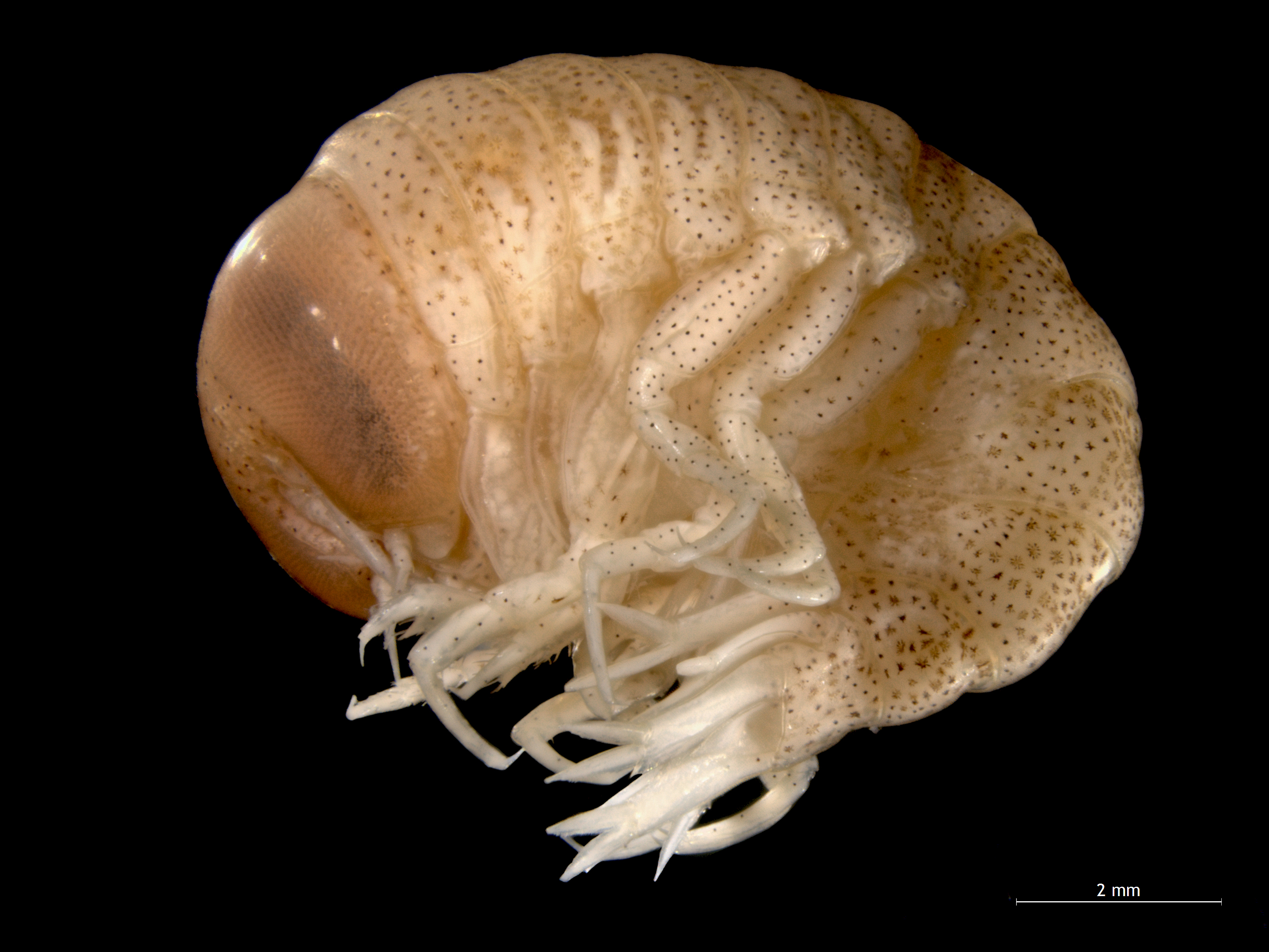
- Hyperia galba

Scientific classification
- Kingdom: Animalia
- Phylum: Arthropoda
- Clade: Pancrustacea
- Class: Malacostraca
- Order: Amphipoda
- Family: Hyperiidae
- Genus: Hyperia; Desmarest, 1823

= Hyperia (crustacean) =

Genus of crustaceans

Hyperia is a genus of amphipods in the family Hyperiidae. It contains the following species:

- Hyperia bowmani M. Vinogradov, 1976
- Hyperia crassa Bowman, 1973
- Hyperia curticephala M. Vinogradov & Semenova, 1985
- Hyperia fabrei H. Milne Edwards, 1830
- Hyperia galba Montagu, 1815
- Hyperia gaudichaudii H. Milne Edwards, 1840
- Hyperia leptura Bowman, 1973
- Hyperia macrocephala Dana, 1853
- Hyperia medusarum Müller, 1776
- Hyperia spinigera Bovallius, 1889
