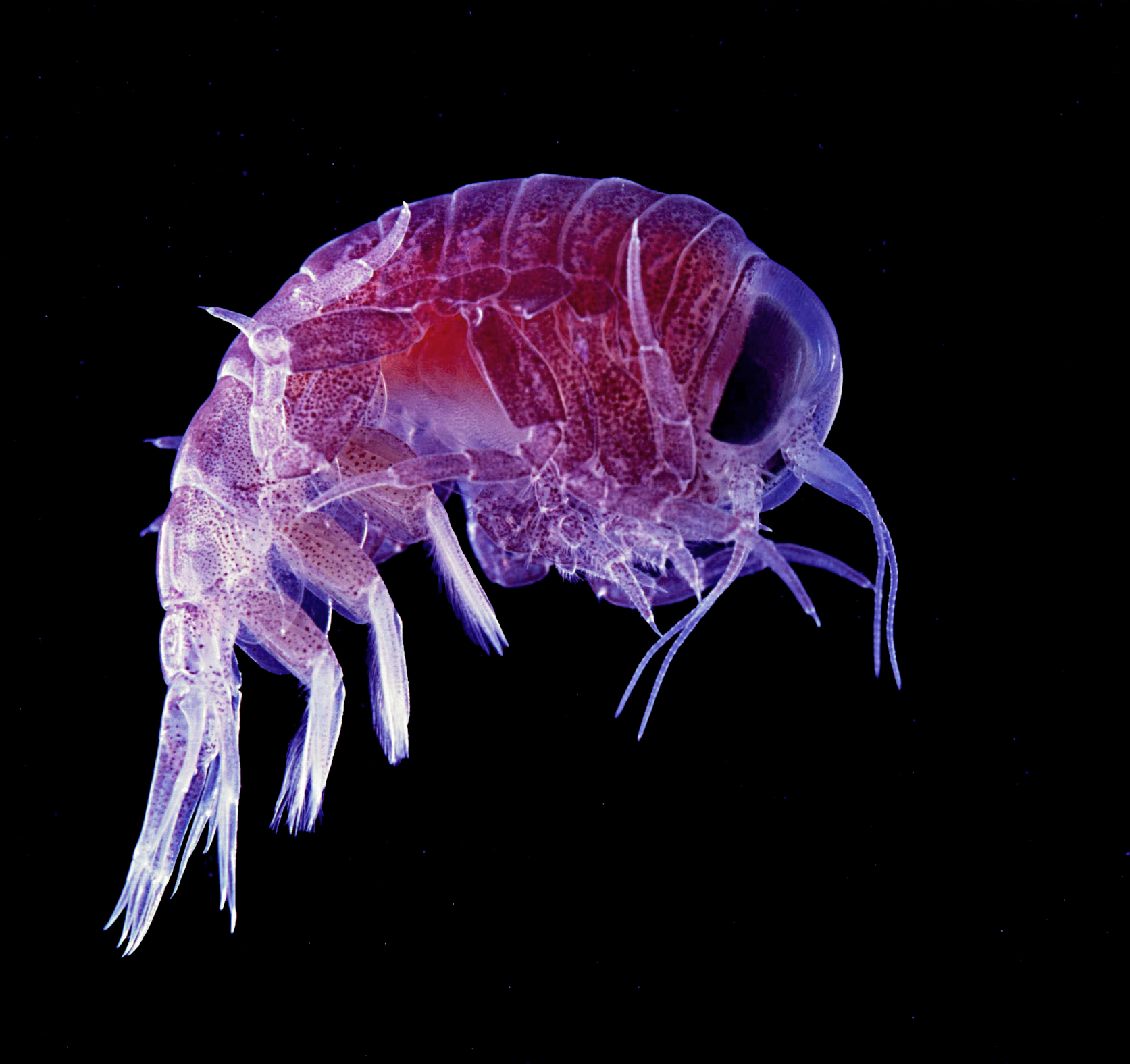

Scientific classification
- Kingdom: Animalia
- Phylum: Arthropoda
- Clade: Pancrustacea
- Class: Malacostraca
- Order: Amphipoda
- Family: Hyperiidae
- Genus: Hyperia
- Species: H. macrocephala

Binomial name
- Hyperia macrocephala (Dana, 1853)

= Hyperia macrocephala =

Species of crustacean

Hyperia macrocephala is a species of zooplankton, an amphipod in the family Hyperiidae. They have been found living inside Desmonema glaciale.

== Etymology ==
The name Hyperia macrocephala comes from the Latin "large head".

== Description ==
This species can grow to 29 millimetres (1.1 in). The head of Hyperia macrocephala is shorter than the combined length of the first two pereonites. Specimens that are large and mature have CX IV that are pointed and laterally projecting. The P III-IV have many short, non-uniform setae on ART 5 and 6. The P V-VII are naked, and have a short cluster of setae apparently on only on the anterodistal margins of ART 2 of P V and VII. There are sharply pointed posterodistal corners on the epimeral plates. There is a strongly convex shape to the posterior margin of the epimera III. The UR is quite thin, the telson being fairly short in length.

== Distribution ==
This species is found in the South Atlantic Ocean and around almost the entire coast of the Antarctic Ocean.

== Symbiosis with Desmonema glaciale ==
Juvenile Hyperia macrocephala are known to feed in the gastrovascular system of Desmonema glaciale. As adults, Hyperia macrocephala feed on its epidermis. The relationship between H. macrocephala and D. glaciale has been described as parasitic.
