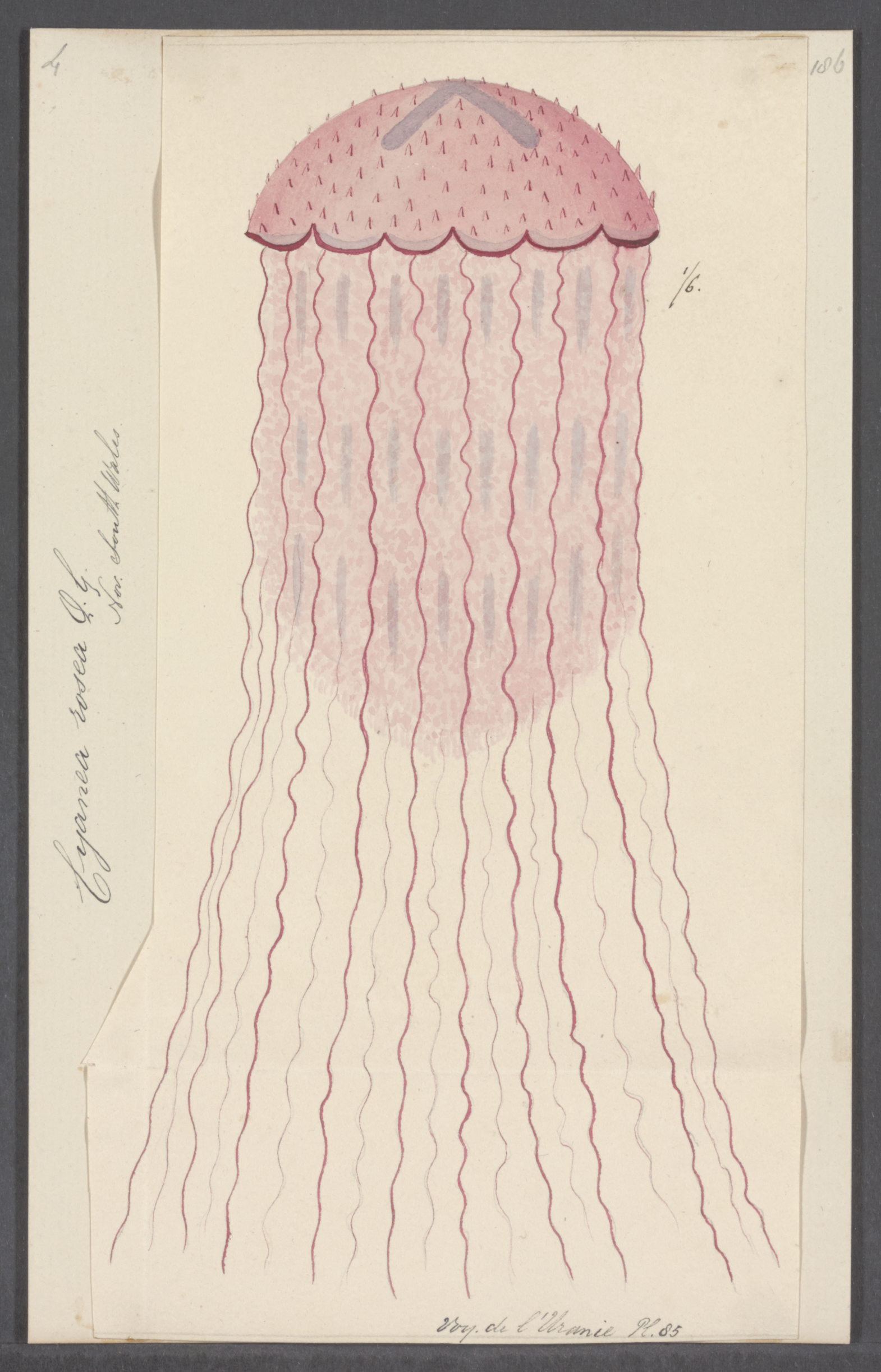

Scientific classification
- Kingdom: Animalia
- Phylum: Cnidaria
- Class: Scyphozoa
- Order: Semaeostomeae
- Family: Cyaneidae
- Genus: Cyanea
- Species: C. rosea

Binomial name
- Cyanea rosea Quoy & Gaimard, 1824

= Cyanea rosea =

Species of jellyfish

Cyanea rosea, also known as the pink lion's mane jellyfish, is a species of jellyfish in the family Cyaneidae.

It was first described by French zoologist Jean René Constant Quoy and French naturalist Joseph Paul Gaimard in 1824.

Cyanea rosea is endemic to the western and southern Pacific Ocean and has been found around Papua New Guinea, the eastern coast of Australia and the western coast of New Zealand.
