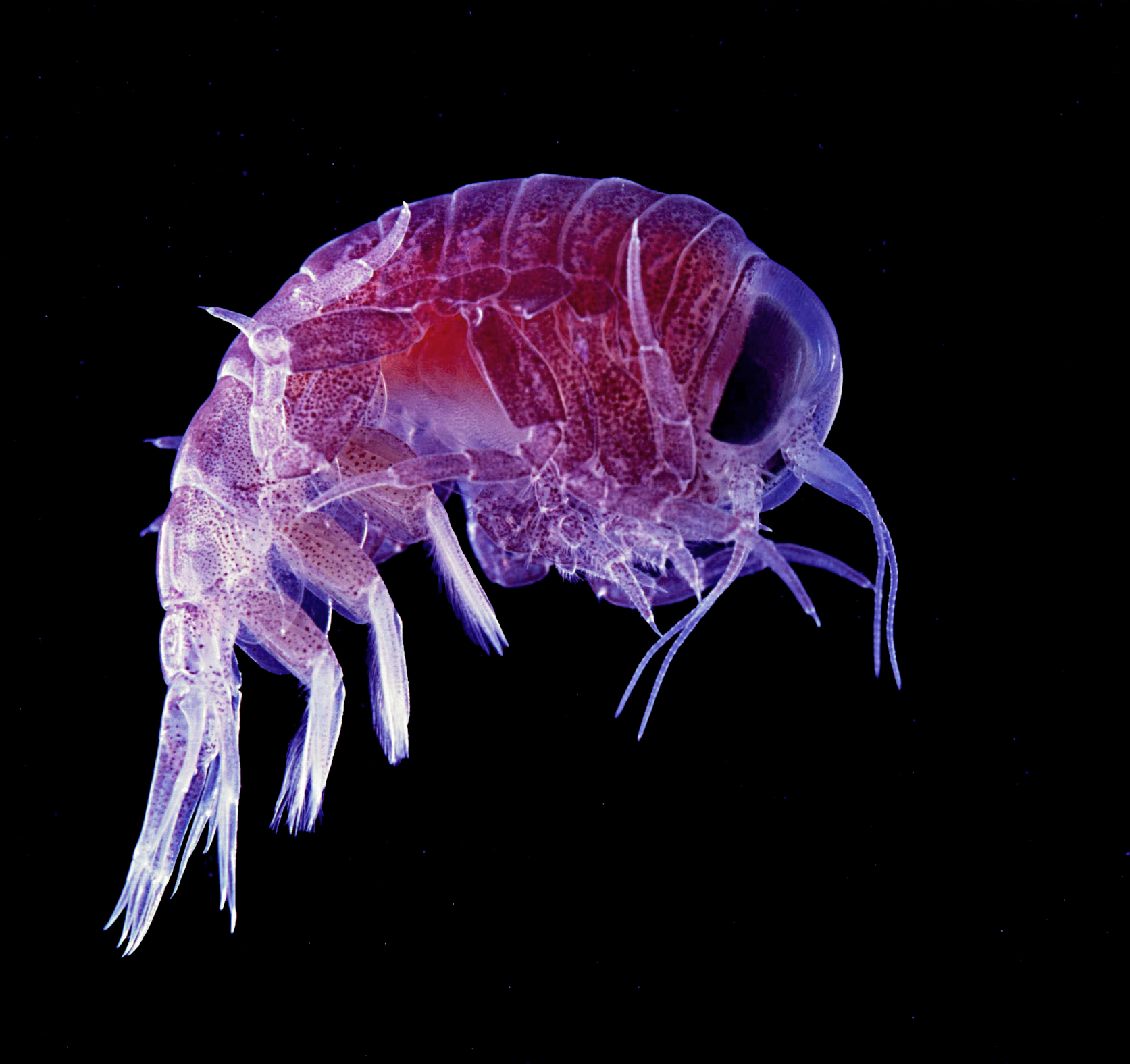
- Hyperia macrocephala

Scientific classification
- Kingdom: Animalia
- Phylum: Arthropoda
- Clade: Pancrustacea
- Class: Malacostraca
- Order: Amphipoda
- Superfamily: Phronimoidea
- Family: Hyperiidae; Dana, 1853

Genera
- See text

= Hyperiidae =

Family of crustaceans

The Hyperiidae are a family of amphipods, containing these genera:

- Euthemisto Bovallius, 1887
- Hyperia Latreille in Desmarest, 1823
- Hyperiella Bovallius, 1887
- Hyperoche Bovallius, 1887
- Laxohyperia M. Vinogradov & Volkov, 1982
- Parathemisto Boeck, 1870
- Pegohyperia Barnard, 1931
- Themisto Guérin-Méneville, 1825
