= List of invertebrates of California =

This list of invertebrates of California lists invertebrate species (animals without a backbone) found in the U.S. state of California. This list includes animals from land, freshwater, and the ocean. The phyla are listed in alphabetical order.

Species that are endemic to the State of California are indicated using an ^{[e]}, introduced species with an ^{[i]}, and invasive species with an ^{[n]}.

== Acoelomorpha ==
Species	Common name
Polychoerus carmelensis	

== Annelida ==
Many of these species were described by Hulton Wood and Samuel James.

Species	Common name
Allolobophora chlorotica^{[i]}	Green worm
Aporrectodea caliginosa^{[i]}	Grey worm
Aporrectodea trapezoides^{[i]}	
Aporrectodea tuberculata^{[i]}	
Argilophilus papillifer	
Argilophilus margaritae	
Dendrobaena rubida^{[i]}	
Diplocardia californiana	
Diplocardia woodi	
Diplocardia montana	
Dodecaceria fewkesi	Fringed filament worm
Eisenia rosea^{[i]}	
Eiseniella tetraedra^{[i]}	
Lumbricidae juveniles^{[i]}	
Microscolex dubius^{[i]}	
Sabaco elongatus	Tube worm
Glycera americana	American bloodworm

=== Class Polychaeta ===
Species	Common name
Arctonoe vittata	Scaleworm
Dodecaceria fewkesi	Fringed filament worm
Dorvillea moniloceras	Candy-striped polychaete
Eudistylia polymorpha	Giant feather duster worm
Ficopomatus enigmaticus	Australian tubeworm
Halosydna brevisetosa	Eighteen-scaled worm
Harmothoe inbricata	Fifteen-scaled worm
Nereis vexillosa	Pile worm
Phragmatopoma californica	California sandcastle worm
Poeobius meseres	Balloon worm
Serpula columbiana	Red-trumpet tubeworm
Spirobranchus spinosus	Panamic Christmas tree worm
Urechis caupo	Fat innkeeper worm

== Arthropoda ==
Subphylum Crustacea

=== Class Branchiopoda ===
==== Order Anostraca ====
===== Family Branchinectidae, fairy shrimp =====
Species	Common name
Branchinecta conservatio	Conservancy fairy shrimp
Branchinecta longiantenna	Longhorn fairy shrimp
Branchinecta sandiegoensis	San Diego fairy shrimp
Branchinecta lynchi	Vernal Pool fairy shrimp
Streptocephalus woottoni	Riverside fairy shrimp
Pacifastacus fortis	Shasta crayfish, placid crayfish

==== Order Notostraca, tadpole shrimp ====
Species	Common name
Lepidurus cryptus	Cryptic pool tadpole shrimp
Lepidurus lemmoni	Lynch tadpole shrimp
Lepidurus packardi	Vernal pool tadpole shrimp
Triops longicaudatus	Longtail tadpole shrimp

==== Order Anomopoda water fleas ====
Species	Common name
Dumontia oregonensis	Hairy water flea
Picripleuroxus denticulatus	

=== Class Hexanauplia ===
Species	Common name
Balanus glandula	Pacific acorn barnacle
Balanus nubilus	Giant acorn barnacle
Chthamalus dalli	Little brown barnacle
Dosima fascicularis	Buoy barnacle
Lepas pacifica	Pacific gooseneck barnacle
Megabalanus californicus	California barnacle
Paraconcavus pacificus	Red-striped acorn barnacle
Pollicipes polymerus	Gooseneck barnacle
Semibalanus cariosus	Thatched barnacle
Tetraclita rubescens	Pink volcano barnacle

=== Class Malacostraca ===
==== Order Decapoda, decapods ====
Species	Common name
Syncaris pacifica	California freshwater shrimp
Neotrypaea californiensis^{[e]}	Bay ghost shrimp
Palaemon macrodactylus^{[i]}	Korean shrimp
Loxorhynchus grandis	Sheep crab
Taliepus nuttallii	Southern kelp crab
Loxorhynchus crispatus	Decorator crab
Oregonia gracilis	Graceful decorator crab
Emerita analoga^{[e]}	Pacific sand crab, pacific mole crab
Pachygrapsus crassipes^{[n]}	Striped shore crab
Planes minutus	Gulfweed crab
Pyromaia tuberculata	Spider crab, tuberculate pear crab
Carcinus maenas^{[n]}	European green crab, green crab, green shore crab
Eriocheir sinensis^{[n]}	Chinese mitten crab
Hemigrapsus oregonensis	Yellow shore crab
Rhithropanopeus harrisii^{[i]}	Harris crab
Randallia ornata	Globe crab
Panulirus interruptus	California spiny lobster

==== Order Isopoda, isopods ====
Species	Common name
Bathynomus giganteus	Giant isopod
Elthusa californica	
Elthusa vulgaris	
Synidotea laevidorsalis	

==== Suborder Oniscidea, woodlice ====
Species	Common name
Alloniscus mirabilis Stuxberg, 1875	
Alloniscus perconvexus Dana, 1856	
Cubaris affinis Dana, 1854	
Cubaris californica Budde-Lund, 1885	
Venezillo arizonicus Mulaik and Mulaik, 1942	
Venezillo microphthalmus Arcangeli, 1932	
Armadillidium vulgare Latreille, 1804	Common pill-bug, common pill woodlouse, roly-poly, potato bug, slater, doodle bug
Armadilloniscus coronacapitalis Menzies, 1950	
Armadilloniscus holmesi Arcangeli, 1933	
Armadilloniscus lindahli Richardson, 1905	
Detonella paillicornis Richardson, 1904	
Ligia pallasii Brandt, 1833	Rock louse
Ligidium gracile Dana, 1856	
Ligidium latum Jackson, 1923	
Oniscus asellus Linnaeaus, 1758	Common woodlouse
Littorophiloscia richardsonae Holmes & Gay, 1909	
Niambia capensis Dollfus, 1895	
Platyarthrus aiasensis Legrand, 1953	
Porcellio dilatatus Brandt, 1833	Giant canyon isopod
Porcellio laevis Latreille, 1804	
Porcellio scaber Latreille, 1804	Rough Woodlouse
Porcellionides floria Garthwaite & Sassaman, 1985	
Haplophthalmus danicus Budde-Lund, 1885	Terrestrial cave isopod
Tylos punctatus Holmes & Gay, 1909	

==== Order Amphipoda, amphiopods ====
Species	Common name
Phronima sedentaria	Barrel amphiopod

=== Class Insecta ===
California has over 30,000 insects in the entire state.

==== Order Coleoptera ====
===== Family Carabidae, ground beetles =====
Species	Common name
Cicindela ohlone ^{[e]}	Ohlone tiger beetle
Elaphrus viridis	Delta green ground beetle

===== Family Cerambycidae, longhorn beetles =====
Species	Common name
Desmocerus californicus dimorphus	Valley elderberry longhorn beetle
Desmocerus californicus californicus	California elderberry longhorn beetle

===== Family Scarabaeidae, scarabs =====
Species	Common name
Polyphylla barbata	Mount Hermon June beetle
Polyphylla decemlineata	Ten-lined June beetle
Chrysochus cobaltinus	Cobalt milkweed beetle
Diabrotica undecimpunctata	Spotted cucumber beetle

==== Order Dermaptera, earwigs ====
Species	Common name
Euborellia annulipes	Ring-legged Earwig
Forficula auricularia	European earwig, common earwig
Labidura riparia	Shore earwig

==== Order Diptera, flies and mosquitoes ====
Species	Common name
Ablautus schlingeri	Oso Flaco robber fly
Apiocera warneri	Glamis sand fly
Brennania belkini	Belkin's dune tabanid fly
Efferia antiochi	Antioch efferian robberfly
Efferia macroxipha	Glamis robberfly
Metapogon hurdi	Hurd's metapogon robberfly
Paracoenia calida	Wilbur Springs shore fly
Rhaphiomidas terminatus abdominalis	Delhi Sands flower-loving fly

==== Order Embiidina, webspinners and footspinners ====
Species	Common name
Haploembia solieri	Bicolored webspinner
Haploembia tarsalis	Pink webspinner
Oligotoma nigra	Black webspinner
Oligotoma saundersii	Saunders' webspinner

==== Order Hemiptera ====
===== Family Macroveliidae =====
Species	Common name
Oravelia pege	Dry Creek cliff strider bug

===== Family Pentatomidae =====
Species	Common name
Bagrada hilaris^{[i]}	Bagrada bug
Chlorochroa belfragii	Belfragi's chlorochroan Bug
Chlorochroa faceta	
Chlorochroa kanei	
Chlorochroa ligata	Conchuela bug
Chlorochroa opuntiae	
Chlorochroa rossiana	
Chlorochroa sayi	Say's stink bug
Chlorochroa uhleri	Uhler's stink bug
Cosmopepla conspicillaris	Hedge nettle stink bug
Cosmopepla intergressa	
Cosmopepla lintneriana	Twice-stabbed stink bug
Cosmopepla uhleri	
Murgantia histrionica ^{[i]}	Harlequin bug

===== Family Saldidae, shorebugs =====
Species	Common name
Saldula usingeri	Wilbur Springs shorebug

==== Order Hymenoptera, sawflies, bees, wasps, and ants ====
Species	Common name
Apis mellifera	Western honey bee, European honey bee
Bombus crotchii	Crotch bumble bee
Bombus suckleyi	Suckley cuckoo bumble bee
Bombus occidentalis occidentalis	Western bumble bee
Bombus franklini	Franklin bumble bee
Chalybion californicum	Blue mud wasp, mud dauber
Pepsis pallidolimbata	Tarantula hawk
Polistes dominula	European paper wasp
Sceliphron caementarium	Black and yellow mud dauber
Sphex ichneumoneus	Great golden digger wasp
Vespula sulphurea	California yellowjacket, western yellowjacket

==== Order Lepidoptera, butterfiles and moths ====
===== Family Hesperiidae, skippers =====
Species	Common name
Pyrgus ruralis lagunae	Laguna Mountains skipper
Pyrgus communis	Common checkered skipper
Ochlodes sylvanoides	Woodland skipper
Ochlodes yuma	Yuma skipper
Hylephila phyleus	Fiery skipper
Poanes melane	Umber skipper
Amblyscirtes vialis	Roadside skipper
Atalopedes campestris	Field skipper, sachem
Carterocephalus palaemon	Arctic skipper
Epargyreus clarus	Silver-spotted skipper
Heliopetes ericetorum	Northern white skipper
Erynnis propertius	Propertius duskywing
Erynnis tristis	Mournful duskywing
Erynnis brizo lacustra	Leathery oak duskywing, sleepy duskywing
Erynnis funeralis	Funereal duskywing

===== Family Nymphalidae =====
Species	Common name
Speyeria zerene behrensii	Behren's silverspot butterfly
Speyeria callippe	Callippe fritillary
Speyeria callippe callippe	Callippe silverspot butterfly
Speyeria zerene myrtleae	Myrtle's silverspot butterfly
Speyeria zerene hippolyta	Oregon silverspot butterfly
Euphydryas editha bayensis	Bay checkerspot butterfly
Euphydryas editha quino	Quino checkerspot
Euphydryas chalcedona	Variable checkerspot
Vanessa atalanta	Red admiral
Vanessa cardui	Painted lady
Vanessa annabella	West coast lady
Vanessa virginiensis	American lady
Nymphalis antiopa	Mourning cloak
Nymphalis californica	California tortoiseshell
Nymphalis milberti	Milbert's Tortoiseshell

===== Family Lycaenidae, gossamer-winged butterflies =====
Species	Common name
Euphilotes enoptes smithi	Smith's blue butterfly
Euphilotes battoides allyni	El Segundo blue butterfly
Glaucopsyche lygdamus palosverdesensis	Palos Verdes blue butterfly
Icaricia icarioides missionensis	Mission blue butterfly
Incisalia mossii bayensis	San Bruno elfin butterfly
Plebejus idas lotis	Lotis blue butterfly

===== Family Riodinidae, metalmarks =====
Species	Common name
Apodemia mormo langei	Lange's metalmark butterfly
Apodemia mormo	Mormon metalmark

===== Family Sphingidae, hawk moths, sphinx moths =====
Species	Common name
Euproserpinus euterpe	Kern primrose sphinx moth
Eumorpha achemon	Achemon sphinx
Hyles lineata	White-lined sphinx

===== Family Papilionidae, hawk moths, sphinx moths =====
Species	Common name
Battus philenor	Pipevine swallowtail
Papilio zelicaon	Anise swallowtail
Papilio rutulus	Western tiger swallow
Papilio multicaudata	Two-tailed swallowtail
Papilio eurymedon	Pale swallowtail
Papilio indra	Indra swallowtail
Parnassius clodius	Clodius Parnassian
Parnassius phoebus behrii	Behr's Parnassian

==== Order Mecoptera, scorpionflies ====
Species	Common name
Orobittacus obscurus	Gold rush hanging scorpionfly

==== Order Odonata, dragonflies and damselflies ====
===== Suborder Anisoptera =====
Species	Common name
Aeshna palmata	Paddle-tailed darner
Aeshna walkeri	Walker's darner
Anax junius	Common green darner
Anax walsinghami	Giant darner
Cordulegaster dorsalis	Pacific spiketail
Erpetogomphus compositus	White-belted spiketail
Erpetogomphus lampropeltis	Serpent ringtail
Macromia magnifica	Western river cruiser
Octogomphus specularis	Grappletail
Progomphus borealis	Gray sanddragon
Rhionaeschna californica	California darner
Rhionaeschna multicolor	Blue-eyed darner
Rhionaeschna psilus	Turquoise-tipped darner
Stylurus intricatus	Brimstone clubtail
Stylurus plagiatus	Russet-tipped clubtail

====== Family Libellulidae ======
Species	Common name
Brachymesia furcata	Red-tailed pennant
Brechmorhoga mendax	Pale-faced clubskimmer
Erythemis collocata	Western pondhawk
Erythemis vesiculosa	Great pondhawk
Erythrodiplax basifusca	Plateau dragonlet
Libellula comanche	Comanche skimmer
Libellula composita	Bleached skimmer
Libellula croceipennis	Neon skimmer
Libellula forensis	Eight-spotted skimmer
Libellula luctuosa	Window skimmer
Libellula nodisticta	Hoary skimmer
Libellula pulchella	Twelve-spotted skimmer
Libellula quadrimaculata	Four-spotted skimmer
Libellula saturata	Flame skimmer
Macrodiplax balteata	Marl pennant
Orthemis ferruginea	Roseate skimmer
Pachydiplax longipennis	Blue dasher
Paltothemis lineatipes	Red rock skimmer
Pantala flavescens	Wandering glider
Pantala hymenaea	Spot-winged glider
Perithemis intensa	Mexican amberwing
Plathemis lydia	Common whitetail
Plathemis subornata	Desert whitetail
Pseudoleon superbus	Filigree skimmer
Sympetrum corruptum	Variegated meadowhawk
Sympetrum illotum	Cardinal meadowhawk
Sympetrum madidum	Red-veined meadowhawk
Sympetrum pallipes	Striped meadowhawk
Sympetrum vicinum	Autumn meadowhawk
Tramea calverti	Striped saddlebag
Tramea lacerata	Black saddlebag
Tramea onusta	Red saddlebag

===== Suborder Zygoptera =====
Species	Common name
Archilestes californicus	California spreadwing
Archilestes grandis	Greater spreadwing
Hetaerina americana	American rubyspot
Lestes congener	Spotted spreadwing
Lestes dryas	Emerald spreadwing
Lestes stultus	Black spreadwing

====== Subfamily Coenagrionoidea ======
Species	Common name
Amphiagrion abbreviatum	Western red damsel
Argia agrioides	California dancer
Argia alberta	Paiute dancer
Argia emma	Emma's dancer
Argia hinei	Lavender dancer
Argia lugens	Sooty dancer
Argia moesta	Powdered dancer
Argia nahuana	Aztec dancer
Argia sedula	Blue-ringed dancer
Argia vivida	Vivid dancer
Enallagma annexum	Northern bluet
Enallagma basidens	Double-striped bluet
Enallagma carunculatum	Tule bluet
Enallagma civile	Familiar bluet
Enallagma praevarum	Arroyo bluet
Ischnura barberi	Dessert forktail
Ischnura cervula	Pacific forktail
Ischnura denticollis	Black-fronted forktail
Ischnura hastata	Citrine forktail
Ischnura perparva	Western forktail
Ischnura ramburii	Rambur's forktail
Telebasis salva	Desert firetail
Zoniagrion exclamationis	Exclamation damsel

==== Order Orthoptera, grasshoppers, katydids, and crickets ====
Species	Common name
Aglaothorax longipenni	Santa Monica shieldback katydid
Ammopelmatus kelsoensis	Kelso jerusalem cricket
Arphia behrensi	California sulphur-winged grasshopper
Dissosteira pictipennis	California rose-winged grasshopper
Stenopelmatus fuscus	Jerusalem cricket
Trimerotropis infantilis	Zayante band-winged grasshopper
Trimerotropis pallidipennis	Pallid-winged grasshopper

==== Order Phthiraptera, lice ====
Species	Common name
Pediculus humanus capitis	Head louse
Pediculus humanus corporis	Body louse
Pthirus pubis	Pubic louse, crab louse

==== Order Plecoptera, stoneflies ====
Species	Common name
Capnia lacustra	Lake Tahoe benthic stonefly

==== Order Trichoptera caddisflies ====
Species	Common name
Cryptochia denningi	Denning's cryptic caddisfly
Cryptochia excella	Kings Canyon cryptochian caddisfly
Cryptochia shasta	Confusion caddisfly
Diplectrona californica	California diplectronan caddisfly
Ecclisomyia bilera	Kings Creek ecclysomyian caddisfly
Farula praelonga	Long-tailed caddisfly
Goeracea oregona	Sagehen Creek goeracean caddisfly
Lepidostoma ermanae	Cold Spring caddisfly
Limnephilus atercus	Fort Dick limnephilus caddisfly
Neothremma genella	Golden-horned caddisfly
Neothremma siskiyou	Siskiyou caddisfly
Parapsyche extensa	King's Creek parapsyche caddisfly
Rhyacophila lineata	Castle Crags rhyacophilan caddisfly
Rhyacophila mosana	Bilobed rhyacophilan caddisfly
Rhyacophila spinata	Spiny rhyacophilan caddisfly

==== Order Thysanoptera thrips ====
Species	Common name
Aeolothrips collaris	
Aeolothrips fasciatus	Banded thrips
Aeolothrips kuwanaii	
Caliothrips marginipennis	
Erythrothrips arizonae	
Erythrothrips keeni	
Franklinothrips vespiformis	Vespiform thrips
Klambothrips myopori	Naio thrips
Liothrips ilex	Toyon gall thrips
Heliothrips haemorrhoidalis	Greenhouse thrips
Hercinothrips femoralis	
Frankliniella occidentalis	Western flower thrips
Gynaikothrips uzeli	Weeping fig thrips
Echinothrips americanus	
Heterothrips salicis	
Frankliniella schultzei	Common blossom thrips, cotton thrips
Hercinothrips bicinctus	Banana silverling thrips
Macrophthalmothrips argus	
Neohydatothrips moultoni	
Neohydatothrips samayunkur	French marigold thrips
Neurothrips magnafemoralis	
Orothrips kelloggi	
Parthenothrips dracaenae	
Rhipidothrips gratiosus	
Scolothrips sexmaculatus	
Thrips tabaci	Onion thrips

== Brachiopoda ==
=== Order Stenolaemata Narrow throat bryozoans ===
Species	Common name
Crisia occidentalis	
Crisia serrata	
Filicrisia franciscana	
Idmonea californica	
Tubulipora pacifica	

=== Order Terebratulida ===
Species	Common name
Laqueus californicus	
Terebratalia transversa	North Pacific lampshell

== Bryozoa ==
=== Class Gymnolaemata ===
Species	Common name
Amathia distans	
Amathia verticillata	Sea beard
Anguinella palmata	
Antropora tincta	
Bugula neritina^{[i]}	Mossy bryozoan, brown bryozoan
Bugula pacifica	
Bugulina californica	Spiral bryozoan
Bugulina stolonifera	
Celleporella hyalina	
Celleporaria brunnea	
Celleporina costazii	
Celleporina robertsoniae	Orange bryozoan
Conopeum reticulum	Encrusting bryozoan
Cryptosula pallasiana^{[i]}	Keyhole bryozoan
Dendrobeania lichenoides	
Flustrellidra corniculata	Leather bryozoan
Flustrellidra spinifera	
Hincksina velata	
Integripelta bilabiata	Red bryozoan
Jellyella tuberculata	Sargassum sea mat
Membranipora membranacea	Kelp lace bryozoan
Membranipora villosa	Lacy crust bryozoan
Pherusella brevituba	
Phidolopora pacifica	Lattice-work bryozoan
Primavelans insculpta	Northern fluted bryozoan
Primavelans mexicana	Southern fluted bryozoan
Schizoporella errata	Branching bryozoan
Schizoporella unicornis^{[i]}	
Thalamoporella californica	
Tricellaria occidentalis	
Watersipora cucullata	Sub-ovoid bryozoan
Watersipora subatra	
Watersipora subtorquata	Red-rust bryozoan

=== Class Phylactolaemata freshwater bryozoans ===
Species	Common name
Cristatella mucedo	
Pectinatella magnificia	Magnificent bryozoan

=== Class Stenolaemata ===
Species	Common name
Diaperoforma californica	Southern staghorn coral
Disporella separata	Purple encrusting bryozoan
Heteropora pacifica	Northern staghorn bryozoan
Patinella radiata	
Tubulipora pacifica	

== Chaetognatha ==
Species	Common name
Sagitta elegans	

== Chordata ==
Subphylum Urochordata

=== Class Ascidiacea ===
==== Order Enterogona ====
Species	Common name
Aplidium californicum	Sea Pork
Aplidium solidum	Red Ascidian, Sea Pork
Clavelina huntsmani	
Cystodytes lobatus	
Didemnum carnulentum	
Diplosoma listerianum	
Distaplia smithi	
Distaplia occidentalis	
Eudistoma molle	
Eudistoma psammion	
Euherdmania claviformis	
Polyclinum planum	Elephant ear tunicate
Pycnoclavella stanleyi	
Ritterella pulchra	
Ritterella rubra	
Synoicum parfustis	
Trididemnum opacum	
Ascidia ceratodes	
Corella willmeriana	Transparent tunicate, transparent sea squirt, solitary tunicate
Ciona savignyi^{[i]}^{[n]}	Pacific transparent sea squirt or solitary sea squirt
Perophora annectens	

==== Order Stolidobranchia ====
Species	Common name
Botryllus schlosseri^{[i]}	Star tunicate
Boltenia villosa	Spiny-headed tunicate, hairy sea squirt, bristly tunicate, stalked hairy sea squirt
Cnemidocarpa finmarkiensis	Broad base sea squirt, red sea squirt, shiny orange sea squirt
Halocynthia igaboja	Sea hedgehog, bristly tunicate
Metandrocarpa taylori	
Pyura haustor	Wrinkled seapump
Styela montereyensis	Stalked tunicate, Monterey stalked tunicate
Styela clava^{[i]}	Leathery sea squirt
Branchiostoma californiense	
Molgula manhattensis	
Botrylloides violaceus^{[i]}	Chain tunicate
Botrylloides diegensis^{[i]}	San Diego sea squirt

==== Order Phlebobranchia ====
Species	Common name
Ciona intestinalis	

=== Class Thaliacea ===
Species	Common name
Iasis cylindrica	

== Cnidaria ==
=== Class Scyphozoa, true jellyfish ===
Species	Common name
Atolla reynoldsi	Deep-sea crown jelly
Aurelia coerulea	Asian moon jelly
Aurelia labiata	Moon jelly, greater moon jelly
Chrysaora colorata	Purple-striped jelly
Chrysaora fuscescens	Pacific sea nettle, West Coast sea nettle
Chrysaora achlyos	Black sea nettle, Black jelly
Chrysaora placamia	South American sea nettle
Cyanea capillata	Lion's mane jellyfish, giant jellyfish
Cyanea ferruginea	Pacific lion's mane jelly
Phacellophora camtschatica	Egg-yolk jelly
Phyllorhiza punctata	Australian spotted jelly
Stellamedusa ventana	Bumpy jelly
Stygiomedusa gigantea	Giant phantom jelly

=== Class Hydrozoa ===
Species	Common name
Aequorea victoria	Crystal jelly
Colobonema sericeum	Silky jelly
Coryne eximia	
Erenna sirena	Angler siphonophore
Polyorchis haplus	
Polyorchis penicillatus	Red-eye medusa
Scrippsia pacifica	Giant bell jelly
Stauridiosarsia bicircella	
Velella velella	By-the-wind-sailor, sea raft, little sail

=== Class Anthozoa, sea anemones and corals ===
==== Order Actiniaria ====
Species	Common name
Anthomastus ritteri	Mushroom soft coral
Anthopleura artemisia	Moonglow anemone
Anthopleura elegantissima	Aggregating anemone
Anthopleura hermaphroditica	Small brown sea anemone
Anthopleura mariae	
Anthopleura sola	Sunburst anemone, starburst anemone
Anthopleura xanthogrammica	Giant green anemone, green surf anemone
Balanophyllia elegans	Orange cup coral
Cribrinopsis albopunctata	White-spotted rose anemone
Diadumene lineata	Orange-striped green anemone
Metridium senile	Plumose anemone
Urticina clandestina	Pacific stubby rose anemone
Urticina columbiana	Sand rose anemone
Urticina grebelnyi	Painted anemone
Urticina mcpeaki	McPeak's anemone
Urticina piscivora	Fish-eating anemone

==== Order Pennatulacea ====
Species	Common name
Ptilosarcus gurneyi	Orange sea pen
Renilla amethystina	
Renilla koellikeri	
Stylatula elongata	Slender sea pen
Virgularia mirabilis	Slender sea pen

== Ctenophora ==
=== Class Tentaculata tentaculate comb jellies ===
Species	Common name
Bolinopsis microptera	Canadian comb jelly
Deiopea kaloktenota	
Euplokamis dunlapae	
Hormiphora californensis	
Kiyohimea usagi Matsumoto & Robison, 1992	
Lampocteis cruentiventer	Bloody-belly comb jelly
Leucothea pulchra	
Pleurobrachia bachei	Pacific sea gooseberry
Pleurobrachia pileus	Sea gooseberry

=== Class Nuda ===
Species	Common name
Beroe abyssicola	Abyssal comb jelly
Beroe cucumis	Northern comb jelly
Beroe forskalli	
Beroe ovata	Brown comb jelly

== Echinodermata ==
=== Class Asteroidea, sea stars ===
Species	Common name
Astrometis sertulifera	Fragile rainbow star
Astropecten armatus	Spiny sand star
Astropecten verrilli	California sand star
Dermasterias imbricata	Leather star
Henricia leviuscula	Pacific blood star
Henricia pumila	Dwarf mottled henricia
Leptasterias hexactis	Six-rayed star
Linckia columbiae	Tamarisk sea star
Mediaster aequalis	Vermilion star
Orthaserias koehleri	Rainbow star
Patiria miniata	Bat star
Pisaster brevispinus	Pink sea star, Giant pink sea star, Pink bay star
Pisaster giganteus	Knobby sea star, giant spined star
Pisaster ochraceus	Ocher sea star
Pycnopodia helianthoides	Sunflower sea star

=== Class Ophiuroidea, brittle stars ===
Species	Common name
Amphiodia occidentalis	Brittle star, long-armed brittle star
Amphiodia akosmos	
Amphiodia occidentalis	Long-armed brittle star
Amphiodia urtica	Burrowing brittle star
Amphipholis squamata	Dwarf brittle star
Amphiura acystata	
Gorgonocephalus eucnemis	Common basket star
Ophiactis savignyi	Little six-arm brittle star, Savignyi's brittle star
Ophioderma panamense	Panama serpent star
Ophioncus granulosus	
Ophionereis annulata	Banded brittle star
Ophionereis diabloensis	
Ophiopholis aculeata	Daisy brittle star, crevice brittle star
Ophiopholis kennerlyi	Daisy brittle star
Ophioplocus esmarki	Esmark's brittle star
Ophiopsila californica	
Ophiopteris papillosa	Flat-spined brittle star
Ophiothrix rudis	Rough banded brittle star
Ophiothrix spiculata	Western spiny brittle star
Ophiura luetkenii	Grey brittle star

=== Class Echinoidea, sea urchins and sand dollars ===
Species	Common name
Agassizia scrobiculata	
Arbacia stellata	Black starry sea urchin
Brissus obesus	
Centrostephanus coroatus	Crowned sea urchin
Dendraster excentricus	Eccentric sand dollar
Lovenia cordiformis	Heart urchin
Lytechinus pictus	White sea urchin
Mesocentrotus franciscanus	Red sea urchin
Strongylocentrotus droebachiensis	Green sea urchin
Strongylocentrotus fragilis	Fragile sea urchin
Strongylocentrotus purpuratus	Purple sea urchin

== Gastrotricha ==
=== Order Chaetonotida ===
Species	Common name
Chaetonotus cordiformis	

=== Order Macrodasyida ===
Species	Common name
Paraturbanella solitaria Todaro, M. A.	Gastrotich
Urodasys anorektoxys Todaro & Hummon, 2000	Gastrotich

== Loricifera ==
=== Order Nanaloricida ===
Species	Common name
Rugiloricus californiensis	

== Mollusca ==
=== Class Bivalvia, bivalves ===
==== Order Mytilida ====
Species	Common name
Adula californiensis	California datemussel
Adula diegensis	San Diego datemussel
Adula gruneri	Curved datemussel
Arcuatula senhousia^{[i]}	Asian date mussel, Asian mussel, Bag mussel
Brachiodontes adamsianus	Adams mussel
Geukensia demissa^{[i]}	Atlantic ribbed marsh mussel, ribbed horsemussel
Leiosolenus plumula	Feather datemussel
Limnoperna fortunei^{[i]}	Golden mussel
Modiolatus neglectus	Neglected horsemussel
Modiolus capax	Fat horsemussel
Modiolus modiolus	Northern horsemussel
Modiolus rectus	Straight horsemussel
Musculista senhousia^{[i]}	Green mussel
Mytilisepta bifurcata	Bifurcate mussel
Mytilus californianus	California mussel
Mytilus edulis	Blue mussel, Common mussel
Mytilus galloprovincialis	Mediterranean mussel
Mytilus trossulus^{[i]}	Bay mussel, foolish mussel

==== Order Ostreida ====
Species	Common name
Ostrea lurida	Olympia oyster
Crassostrea virginica^{[i]}	Eastern oyster, American oyster, Atlantic oyster
Crassostrea gigas^{[i]}	Pacific oyster, Japanese oyster, Miyagi oyster

==== Order Venerida ====
Species	Common name
Gemma gemma^{[i]}	Gem clam
Pseudochama exogyra	Jewel box clam, reversed chama
Ruditapes philippinarum	Japanese littleneck

==== Order Myida ====
Species	Common name
Mya arenaria^{[i]}	Atlantic softshell clam
Potamocorbula amurensis^{[n]}	Overbite clam, Asian clam

=== Class Gastropoda, gastropods ===
==== Order Archaeogastropoda ====
Species	Common name
Haliotis sorenseni	White abalone
Haliotis cracherodii^{[e]}	Black abalone
Lottia gigantea	Owl limpet
Lottia scabra	Rough limpet
Megathura crenulata	Giant keyhole limpet
Fissurella volcano	Volcano limpet

==== Order Pulmonata ====
Species	Common name
Helminthoglypta walkeriana	Banded Dune Snail, Morro shoulderband
Monadenia infumata	Redwood sideband snail
Monadenia setosa	Trinity bristle snail

==== Order Stylommatophora ====
Species	Common name
Ariolimax buttoni^{[e]}	Button's banana slug
Ariolimax californicus^{[e]}	California banana slug
Ariolimax columbianus	Pacific banana slug
Ariolimax dolichophallus^{[e]}	Slender banana slug
Lehmannia valentiana	Three-banded garden slug, Valencia slug, greenhouse slug
Deroceras invadens	Tramp slug
Deroceras reticulatum	Gray field slug, milky slug
Arion hortensis	Garden slug
Milax gagates	Greenhouse slug, jet slug
Cornu aspersum (formerly named Helix aspersa	Garden snail, European garden snail, brown garden snail
Oxychilus cellarius	Cellar glass snail

==== Order Nudibranchia ====
Species	Common name
Coryphella trilineata	Three-lined aeolid
Diaulula sandiegensis	Dorid Nudibranch, San Diego dorid
Doris montereyensis	Monterey dorid
Flabellinopsis iodinea	Spanish shawl
Hermissenda crassicornis	Thick-horned nudibranch, horned nudibranch
Hermissenda opalescens	Opalescent nudibranch
Okenia rosacea	Hopkin's rose
Peltodoris nobilis	Noble dorid
Phidiana hiltoni	Hilton's aeolid
Sakuraeolis enosimensis	
Triopha catalinae	Clown dorid
Triopha maculata	Spotted dorid

==== Order Neotaenioglossa ====
Species	Common name
Crepidula adunca	Hooked slipper snail
Crepidula convexa^{[i]}	Convex slipper snail
Crepidula plana^{[i]}	Eastern white slipper snail

==== Order Neogastropoda ====
Species	Common name
Busycotypus canaliculatus^{[i]}	Channeled whelk
Californiconus californicus	California cone
Callianax alectona	Beatic dwarf olive snail
Callianax biplicata	Purple olive snail
Callianax strigata	
Ceratostoma foliatum	Leafy hornmouth
Ilyanassa obsoleta	Eastern mud snail
Kelletia kelletii	Kellet's whelk
Olivella pedroana	San Pedro dwarf olive snail
Pteropurpura festiva	Festive murex
Urosalpinx cinerea^{[i]}	Atlantic oyster drill

==== Order Trochida ====
Species	Common name
Angaria delphinus	Lacinate dolphin shell
Calliostoma annulatum	Jeweled top snail
Calliostoma canaliculatum	Channeled topsnail
Calliostoma gemmulatum	Western gem topshell
Calliostoma gloriosum	Glorious topsnail
Calliostoma ligatum	Blue-ringed top snail, Blue top snail
Calliostoma supragranosum	Granulose topsnail
Calliostoma tricolor	Three-colored top snail
Eulithidium comptum	
Eulithidium pulloides	Sullied pheasant
Eulithidium rubrilineatum	
Gigahomalopoma luridum	Dall's dwarf turban
Halistylus pupoideus	
Homalopoma baculum	Berry dwarf-turban
Homalopoma radiatum	
Liotia fenestrata	
Margarites pupillus	Puppet margarite
Megastraea undosa	Wavy turban
Megastraea turbanica	Turban star shell
Norrisia norrisii	Kelp snail, Norris's topsnail
Parviturbo acuticostatus	
Pomaulax gibberosus	Red turban snail
Tegula aureotincta	Glided tegula
Tegula brunnea	Brown turban snail
Tegula eiseni	Western banded tegula
Tegula funebralis	Black turban snail, black tegula
Tegula gallina	Speckled tegula
Tegula montereyi	Monterey tegula
Tegula pulligo	Dusky tegula
Tegula regina	Queen tegula

==== Order Littorinimorpha ====
Species	Common name
Dodecaceria fewkesi	Tube snail
Littorina planaxis	Eroded periwinkle

==== Superfamily Aplysioidea ====
Species	Common name
Aplysia californica	California sea hare, California brown sea hare
Aplysia vaccaria	Black sea hare

==== Order Cephalaspidea, shieldheaded slugs ====
Species	Common name
Acteocina cerealis	
Acteocina culcitella	
Acteocina harpa	
Acteocina inculta	
Aglaja ocelligera	Spotted aglaja
Bulla gouldiana	Cloudy bubble snail
Cylichna diegensis	
Diaphana californica	California diaphana
Gastropteron pacificum	Pacific batwing seaslug
Haminoea vesicula	Blister glassy-bubble
Haminoea virescens	Green bubble snail
Haloa japonica^{[n]}	Japanese bubble snail
Melanochlamys diomedea	Albatross aglaja
Navanax inermis	California aglaja
Navanax polyalphos	
Philine auriformis^{[n]}	New Zealand tortellini snail
Philine orientalis^{[n]}	Oriental tortellini snail

==== Superfamily Cerithioidea ====
Species	Common name
Alabina barbarensis Bartsch, 1911	
Alabina californica Dall & Bartsch, 1901	
Alabina hamlini Bartsch, 1911	
Alabina monicenis Bartsch, 1911	
Alabina phanea Bartsch, 1911	
Alabina tenuisculpta Bartsch, 1911	

=== Class Cephalopoda, cephalopods ===
==== Subclass Coleoidea ====
Species	Common name
Abraliopsis falco Young, 1972	
Bathyteuthis berryi Roper, 1968	
Chiroteuthis calyx Young, 1972	
Cirroteuthis macrope Berry, 1911	Vampire squid
Eledonella heathi Berry, 1911	
Galiteuthis phyllura Berry, 1911	Cockatoo squid
Gonatus californiensis Young, 1972	
Gonatus onyx Young, 1972	Clawed armhook squid, black-eyed squid
Gonatus pyros Young, 1972	fiery gonate squid, fiery armhook squid
Loligo opalescens	Inshore opalescent squid, market squid

===== Order Octopoda =====
Species	Common name
Argonauta argo	Greater argonaut
Enteroctopus dofleini	Giant Pacific octopus
Haliphron atlanticus	Seven-armed octopus
Octopus bimaculatus	Verrill's two-spot octopus
Octopus bimaculoides	Two-spot octopus, lesser two-spot octopus
Octopus micropyrsus	California's lilliput octopus
Octopus rubescens	East Pacific red octopus, red octopus

==== Order Myopsida ====
Species	Common name
Doryteuthis opalescens	Opalescent inshore squid

=== Class Polyplacophora ===
Species	Common name
Acanthochitona imperatrix Watters, 1981	
Acanthopleura fluxa Carpenter, 1864	
Cryptochiton stelleri	Gumboot chiton
Cyanoplax hartwegii	Hartweg's chiton
Katharina tunicata	Black leather chiton
Lepidozona cooperi	Cooper's chiton
Mopalia lignosa	Woody chiton
Mopalia muscosa	Mossy chiton
Nuttallina californica	California spiny chiton
Nuttallina fluxa	Spiny chiton
Stenoplax conspicua	Conspicuous chiton
Tonicella lineata	Lined chiton
Tonicella lokii	Flame lined chiton

== Nematoda ==
Species	Common name
Acanthonchus viviparus	
Cyatholaimus jollaensis	
Deontostoma arcticum	
Deontostoma demani	
Dorylaimopsis perfecta	
Gomphionema fellator	
Microlaimus macrolaimus	
Microlaimus macrolaimus	
Paracanthonchus mortenseni	
Paracanthonchus paramacrodon	
Seuratiella californica	
Seuratiella duplex	
Seuratiella pedroensis	
Skrjabinoclava hartwichi	
Synonema californicum	

== Nemertea ==
=== Class Anopla ===
Species	Common name
Cerebratulus albifrons	
Cerebratulus lineolatus Coe, 1905	
Cerebratulus marginatus	

=== Class Enopla ===
Species	Common name
Carcinonemertes errantia Wickham, 1978	
Carcinonemertes kurisi Sadeghian & Santos, 2010	
Carcinonemertes wickhami	
Chunianna opaca Coe, 1954	
Chunianna pacifica Coe, 1954	
Chuniella tenella Coe, 1954	
Cuneonemertes elongata Coe, 1954	
Cuneonemertes obesa Coe, 1945	
Dichonemertes hartmanae Coe, 1938	
Malacobdella macomae Kozloff, 1991	
Paradinonemertes macrostomum Coe	
Poseidonemertes collaris Roe & Wickham, 1984	
Acanthobothrium unilateralis Alexander, 1953	
Tubonemertes aureola Coe, 1954	

=== Class Hoplonemertea ===
Species	Common name
Amphiporus formidabilis	
Argonemertes dendyi	
Emplectonema viride	
Geonemertes pelaenis	
Leptonemertes chalicophora	
Nipponnemertes bimaculata	Chevron ribbon worm
Nipponnemertes punctatula	
Paranemertes peregrina	Purple ribbon worm
Prosadenoporus floridensis	
Quasitetrastemma nigrifrons	

=== Class Palaeonemertea ===
Species	Common name
Tubulanus frenatus	
Tubulanus ruber	
Tubulanus sexlineatus	Six-lined ribbon worm

=== Class Pilidiophora ===
Species	Common name
Baseodiscus delineatus	
Baseodiscus punnetti	
Euborlasia nigrocincta	
Lineus pictifrons	
Micrura verrilli	Reticulated purple ribbon worm

== Phoronida ==
Species	Common name
Phoronis ijimai	
Phoronopsis californica	
Phoronopsis harmeri	

== Platyhelminthes ==
=== Class Cestoda ===
Species	Common name
Acanthobothrium brachyacanthum Riser, 1955	
Acanthobothrium goldsteini Appy & Dailey, 1973	
Acanthobothrium hispidum Riser, 1955	
Acanthobothrium holorhini Alexander, 1953	
Acanthobothrium maculatum Riser, 1955	
Acanthobothrium microcephalus	
Acanthobothrium olseni Dailey & Mudry, 1968	
Acanthobothrium parviuncinatum Young, 1954	
Acanthobothrium rhinobati Alexander, 1953	
Acanthobothrium robustum Alexander, 1953	
Acanthobothrium unilateralis Alexander, 1953	
Dipylidium caninum	Flea tapeworm, Cucumber tapeworm, Double-pored tapeworm
Phoronopsis californica	
Phoronopsis harmeri	

|}

=== Class Turbellaria ===
Species	Common name
Collastoma pacifica Kozloff	
Dendrocoelopsis hymanae Kawakatsu	
Nexilis epichitonius Holleman & Hand	
Notocomplana acticola	Flatworm
Phagocata nivea tahoena Kawakatsu	
Plehnia caeca Hyman, 1953	
Polycelis monticola Kenk & Hampton	
Polycelis sierrensis Kenk, 1973	
Polychoerus carmelensis Costello & Costello	
Sphalloplana californica Kenk, 1977	

== Porifera ==
=== Class Demospongiae ===
Species	Common name
Halichondria bowerbanki	Yellow sponge, yellow sun sponge
Clathria prolifera	Red beard sponge
Tethya aurantia	Orange puffball sponge
Oscarella carmela	Slime sponge
Plakina bioxea	

=== Subclass Tetractinomorpha ===
==== Order Astrophorida ====
Species	Common name
Dercitus syrmatitus	
Geodia agassizii	
Geodia breviana	
Geodia gibberosa	White encrusting sponge
Geodia mesotriaena	
Geodia mesotrianella	
Geodia ovis	
Geodia robusta megasterra	
Penares cortius	
Penares saccharis	
Poecillastra rickettsi	
Poecillastra tenuilaminaris	
Sidonops angulata	
Stelletta clarella	
Stelletta estrella	
Stoeba syrmatitus	

==== Order Hadromerida ====
Species	Common name
Cliona californiana	Yellow boring sponge, sulphur sponge
Polymastia pachymastia	
Polymastia pacifica	
Protosuberites sisyrnus	
Rhizaxinella gadus	
Spheciospongia confoederata	
Suberites latus	
Suberites suberea	
Tethya californiana	
Timea authia	

==== Order Spirophorida ====
Species	Common name
Craniella arb	
Tetilla mutabilis	

=== Subclass Ceractinomorpha, demosponges ===
==== Order Poecilosclerida ====
Species	Common name
Acarnus erithacus	
Artemisina archegona	
Cyamon catalina	
Cyamon koltuni	
Cyamon neon	
Iophon lamella	
Iophon rayae	

==== Suborder Myxillina ====
Species	Common name
Acanthancora cyanocrypta	
Isodyctya quatsinoensis	
Phorbas californiana	
Phorbas hoffmani	
Plocamionida lyoni	

== Rotifera ==
Species	Common name
Brachionus quadridentatus	
Brachionus variabilis	
Colurella uncinata	
Dicranophoroides caudatus	
Genus Lecane	
Genus Lepadella	
Genus Mytilina	
Otostephanos donneri	
Philodina acuticornis	
Philodina megalotrocha	
Philodina roseola	Common Rotifer
Philodina rugosa	
Platyias quadricornis	
Rotaria rotatoria	
Rotaria tardigrada	
Genus Squatinella	
Stephanoceros fimbriatus	

== Sipuncula ==
Species	Common name
Apionsoma murinae Cutler, 1969	
Dendrostoma perimeces Fisher, 1928	
Dendrostoma petraeum Fisher, 1928	
Dendrostomum dyscritum Fisher, 1952	
Phascolosoma agassizii	Pacific Peanut Worm
Sipunculus nudus	
Themiste dyscrita	
Themiste hennahi	
Themiste pyroides	

== Tardigrada ==
=== Class Heterotardigrada ===
Species	Common name
Batillipes gilmartini McGinty, 1969	
Echiniscoides sigismundi Schultze, 1865	
Echiniscus becki Schuster & Grigarick, 1966	
Echiniscus blumi Richters, 1903	
Multipseudechiniscus raneyi Grigarick et al., 1964	
