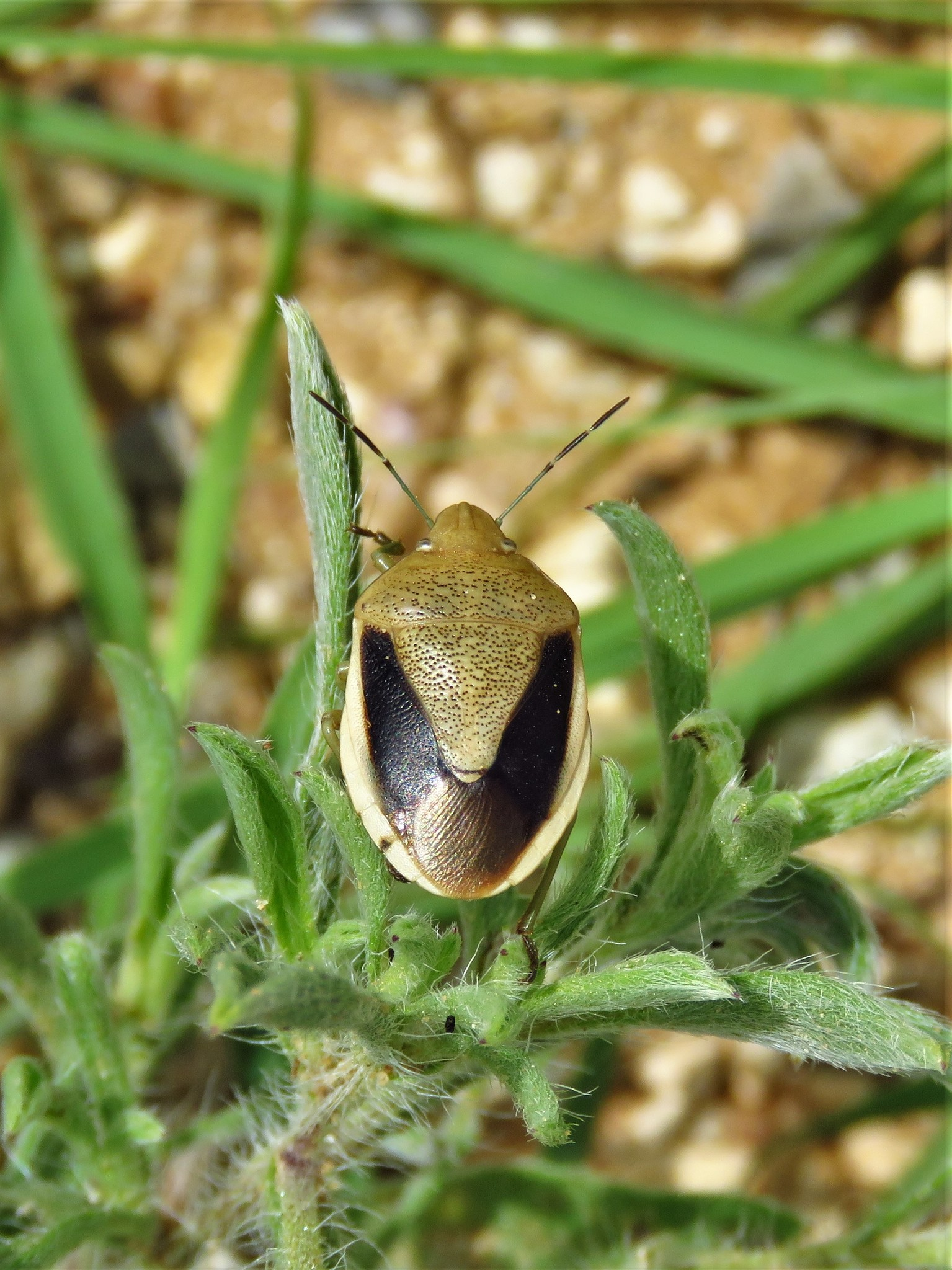

Scientific classification
- Kingdom: Animalia
- Phylum: Arthropoda
- Class: Insecta
- Order: Hemiptera
- Suborder: Heteroptera
- Family: Pentatomidae
- Tribe: Nezarini
- Genus: Chlorochroa
- Species: C. osborni

Binomial name
- Chlorochroa osborni (Van Duzee, 1904)

= Chlorochroa osborni =

Species of true bug

Chlorochroa osborni is a species of stink bug in the family Pentatomidae. It is found in Central America and North America.
