= Chlorochroa persimilis =

Scientific classification
- Kingdom: Animalia
- Phylum: Arthropoda
- Clade: Pancrustacea
- Class: Insecta
- Order: Hemiptera
- Suborder: Heteroptera
- Family: Pentatomidae
- Tribe: Nezarini
- Genus: Chlorochroa
- Species: C. persimilis

Binomial name
- Chlorochroa persimilis Horvath, 1908

Species of true bug

Chlorochroa persimilis is a species of stink bug in the family Pentatomidae. It is found in North America.
