= Chlorochroa granulosa =

Scientific classification
- Domain: Eukaryota
- Kingdom: Animalia
- Phylum: Arthropoda
- Class: Insecta
- Order: Hemiptera
- Suborder: Heteroptera
- Family: Pentatomidae
- Tribe: Nezarini
- Genus: Chlorochroa
- Species: C. granulosa

Binomial name
- Chlorochroa granulosa (Uhler, 1872)

Species of true bug

Chlorochroa granulosa is a species of stink bug in the family Pentatomidae. It is found in North America.
