= Chlorochroa lineata =

Scientific classification
- Domain: Eukaryota
- Kingdom: Animalia
- Phylum: Arthropoda
- Class: Insecta
- Order: Hemiptera
- Suborder: Heteroptera
- Family: Pentatomidae
- Tribe: Nezarini
- Genus: Chlorochroa
- Species: C. lineata

Binomial name
- Chlorochroa lineata Thomas, 1983

Species of true bug

Chlorochroa lineata is a species of stink bug in the family Pentatomidae. It is found in North America.
