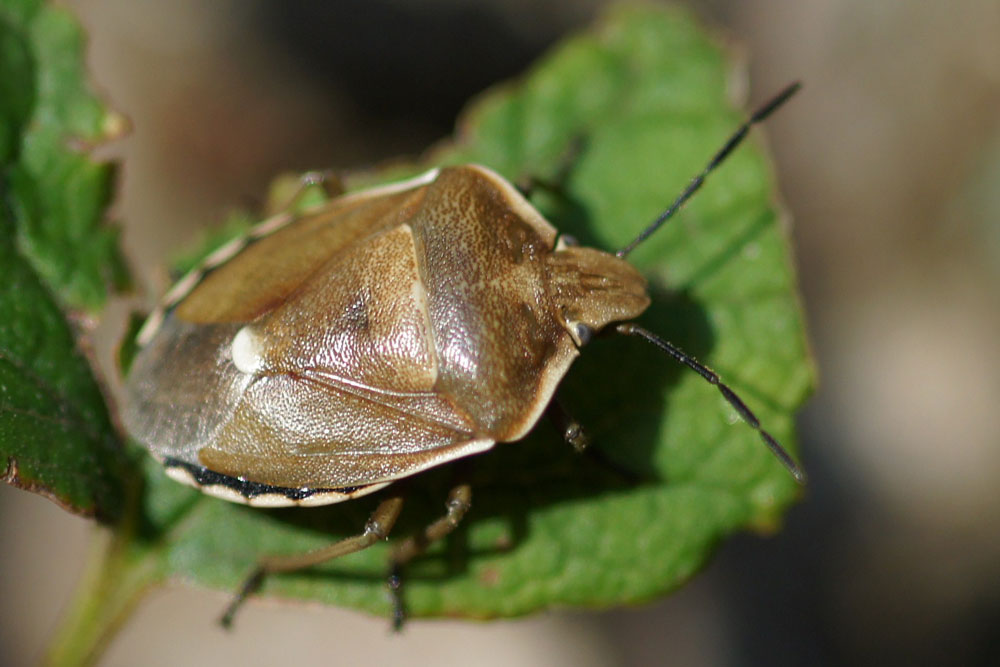

Scientific classification
- Domain: Eukaryota
- Kingdom: Animalia
- Phylum: Arthropoda
- Class: Insecta
- Order: Hemiptera
- Suborder: Heteroptera
- Family: Pentatomidae
- Subfamily: Pentatominae
- Tribe: Nezarini
- Genus: Chlorochroa
- Species: C. pinicola

Binomial name
- Chlorochroa pinicola (Mulsant & Rey, 1852)

Synonyms
- Pentatoma pinicola Mulsant & Rey, 1852

= Chlorochroa pinicola =

Species of true bug

Chlorochroa pinicola is a European species of shield bug in the tribe Nezarini.
