= Brachynema =

Brachynema is the scientific name of two genera of organisms and may refer to:

- Brachynema (bug), a genus of stinkbugs in the family Pentatomidae
- Brachynema (plant), a genus of plants in the family Olacaceae
