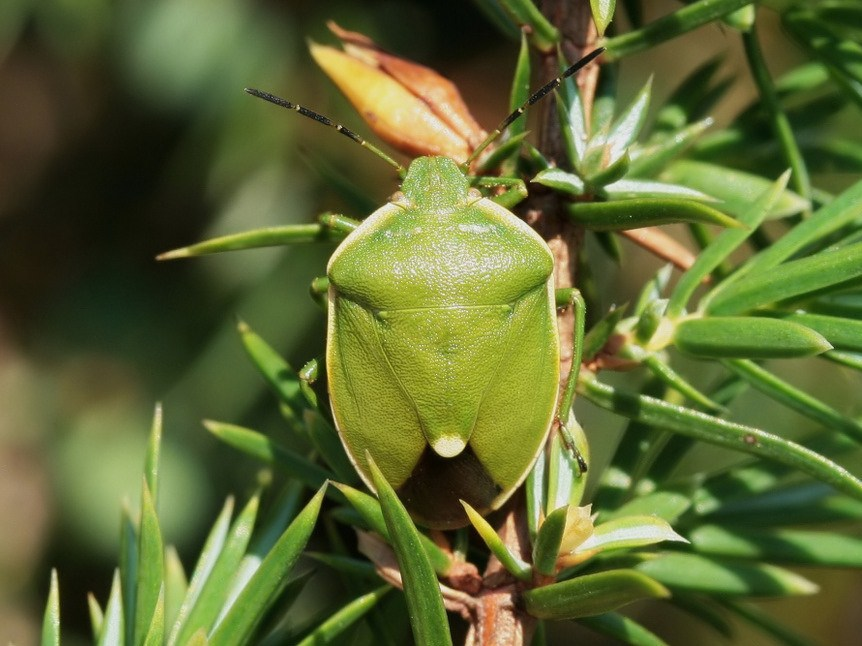

Scientific classification
- Kingdom: Animalia
- Phylum: Arthropoda
- Class: Insecta
- Order: Hemiptera
- Suborder: Heteroptera
- Family: Pentatomidae
- Subfamily: Pentatominae
- Tribe: Nezarini
- Genus: Chlorochroa
- Species: C. juniperina

Binomial name
- Chlorochroa juniperina (Linnaeus, 1758)

Synonyms
- Chlorochroa junipera (Linnaeus, 1758); Chlorochroa juniperina subsp. Juniperina; Cimex juniperina Linnaeus, 1758; Pentatoma juniperina (Linnaeus, 1758)

= Chlorochroa juniperina =

Juniper Shield Bug

Species of true bug

Chlorochroa juniperina, commonly known as the juniper shield bug, is a European species of shield bug in the tribe Nezarini. C. juniperina is distributed in mainland Europe from France through to Scandinavia, but became extinct in England in 1925 due to the decline of juniper, its host.

The plate below shows C. juniperina - "Pentantoma juniperina Linn" (bottom-right) in The Hemiptera Heteroptera of the British Islands.

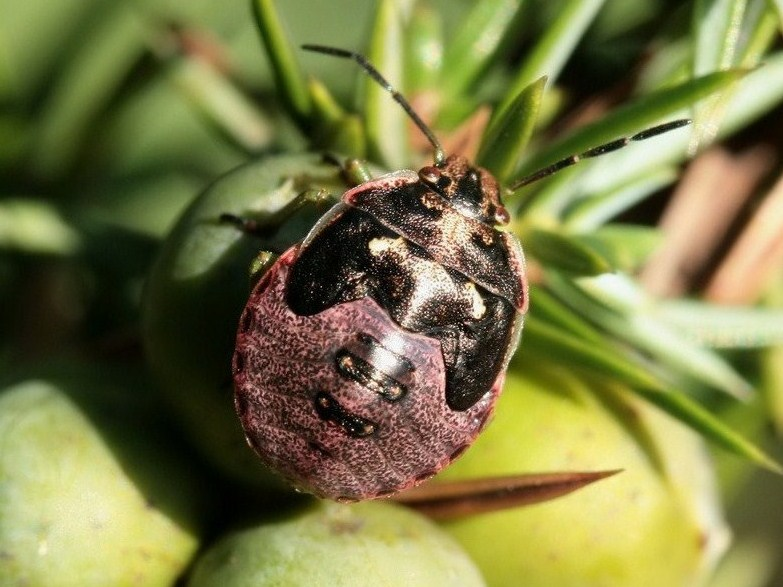
Nymph

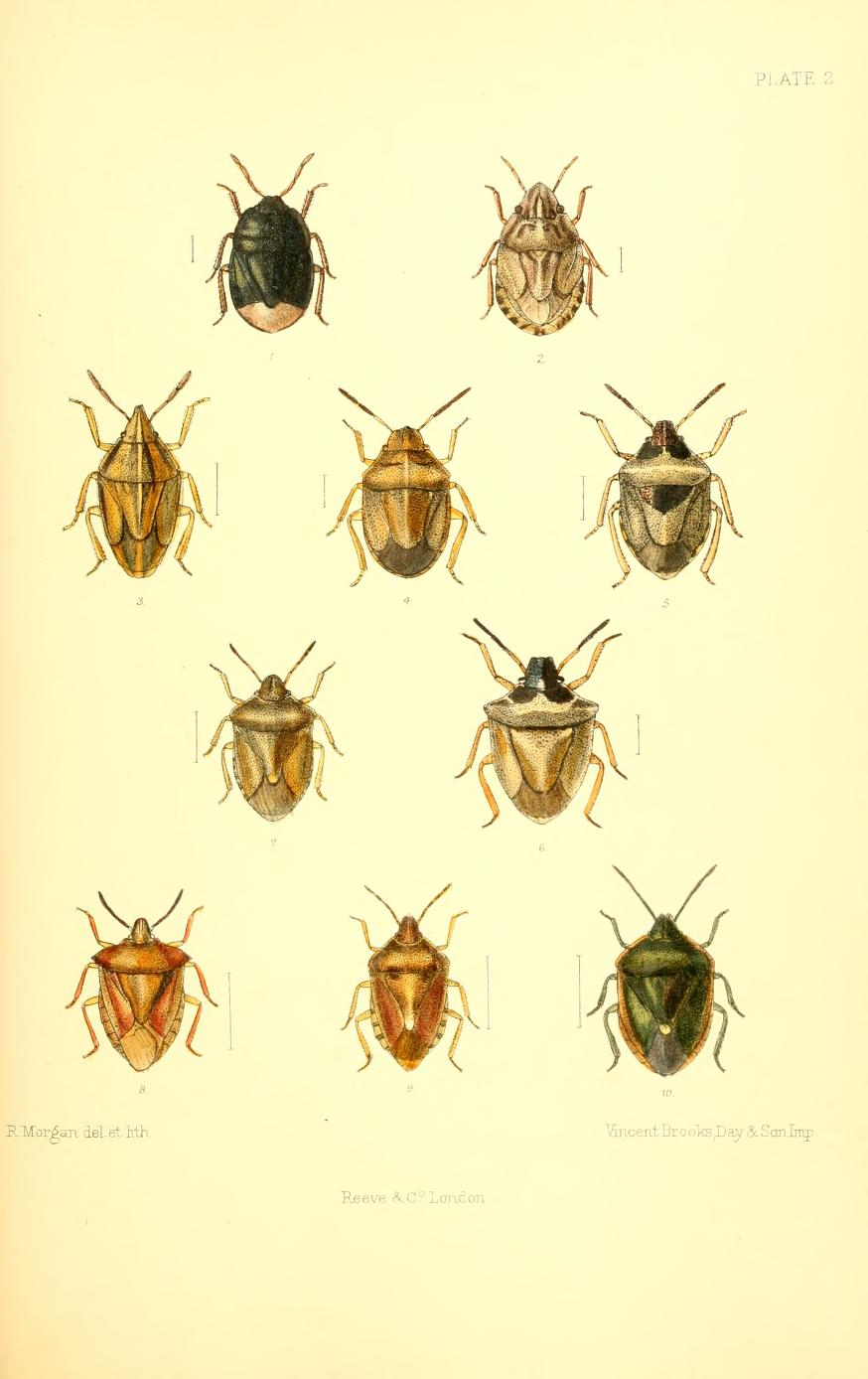
Plate 2 from Saunders (1892)
