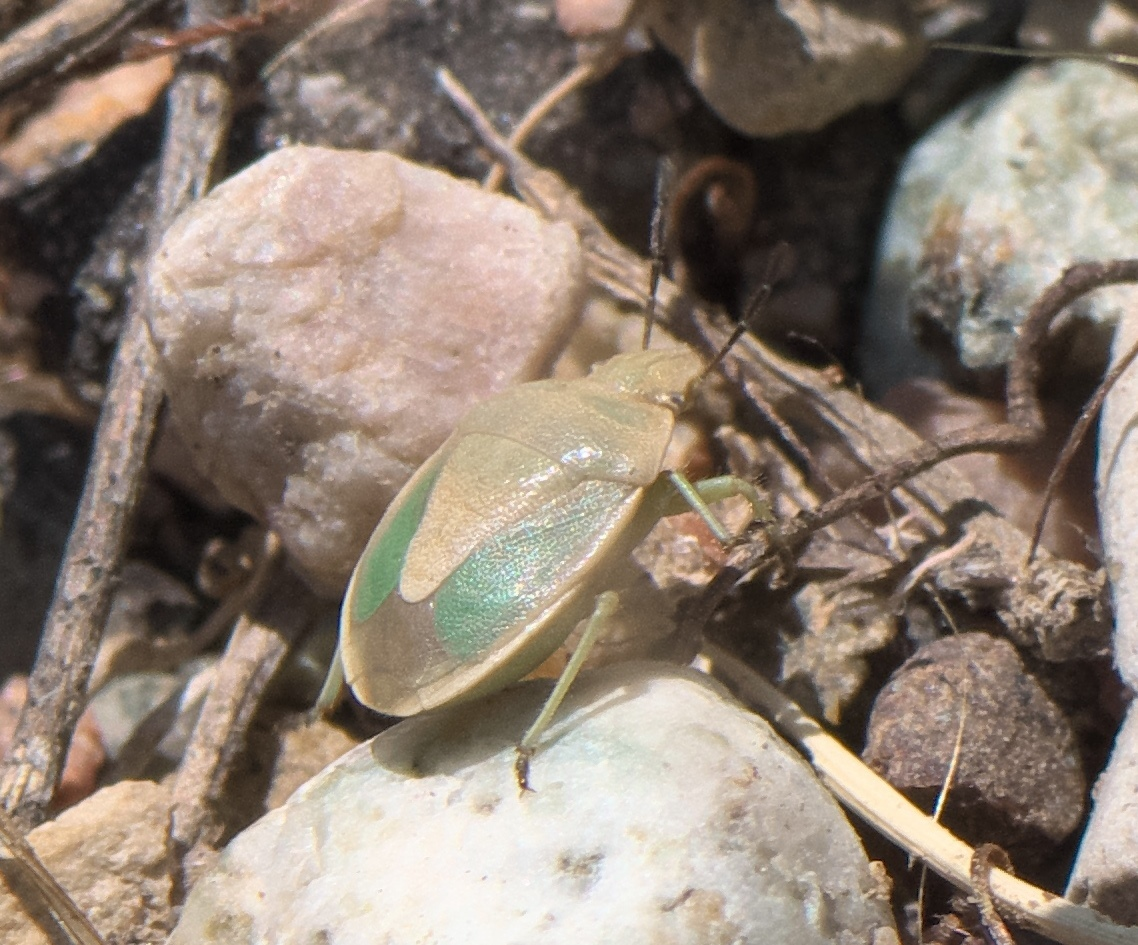
- Chlorochroa viridicata, Colorado

Scientific classification
- Kingdom: Animalia
- Phylum: Arthropoda
- Class: Insecta
- Order: Hemiptera
- Suborder: Heteroptera
- Family: Pentatomidae
- Genus: Chlorochroa
- Species: C. viridicata

Binomial name
- Chlorochroa viridicata (Walker, 1867)

= Chlorochroa viridicata =

Species of true bug

Chlorochroa viridicata is a species of stink bug in the family Pentatomidae. It is found in Central America and North America.
