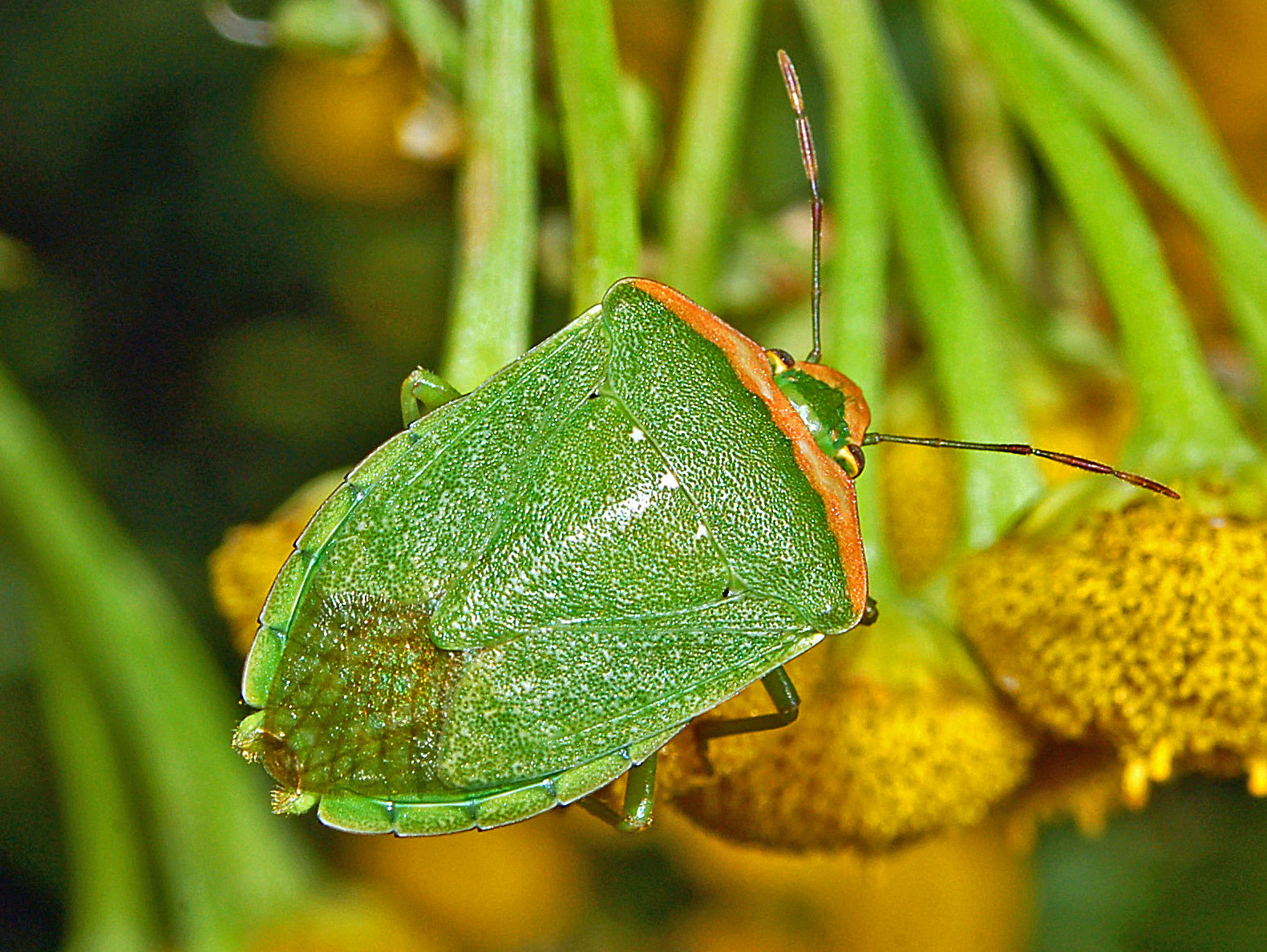
- Nezara viridula f. torquata

Scientific classification
- Domain: Eukaryota
- Kingdom: Animalia
- Phylum: Arthropoda
- Class: Insecta
- Order: Hemiptera
- Suborder: Heteroptera
- Superfamily: Pentatomoidea
- Family: Pentatomidae
- Subfamily: Pentatominae
- Tribe: Nezarini
- Genus: Nezara; Amyot & Serville, 1843

= Nezara =

Genus of true bugs

Nezara is a genus of plant-feeding stink bug of the family Pentatomidae, first described by Charles Jean-Baptiste Amyot & Jean Guillaume Audinet-Serville in 1843.

== Species ==
(From Biolib)

- Nezara antennata Scott, 1874
- Nezara capicola (Westwood, 1837)
- Nezara griseipennis Ellenrieder, 1862
- Nezara icterica Horváth, 1889
- Nezara immaculata Freeman, 1940
- Nezara indica Azim & Shafee, 1979
- †Nezara latitesta Theobald, 1937
- Nezara mendax Breddin, 1908
- Nezara naspirus (Dallas, 1851)
- Nezara niamensis (Distant, 1890)
- Nezara nigromaculata Distant, 1902
- Nezara orbiculata Distant, 1890
- Nezara paradoxus Cachan, 1952
- Nezara pulchricornis Breddin, 1903
- Nezara raropunctata Ellenrieder, 1862
- Nezara robusta Distant, 1898
- Nezara similis Freeman, 1940
- Nezara soror Schouteden, 1905
- Nezara subrotunda Breddin, 1908
- Nezara viridula (Linnaeus, 1758) – southern green shieldbug
- Nezara yunnana Zheng, 1982
