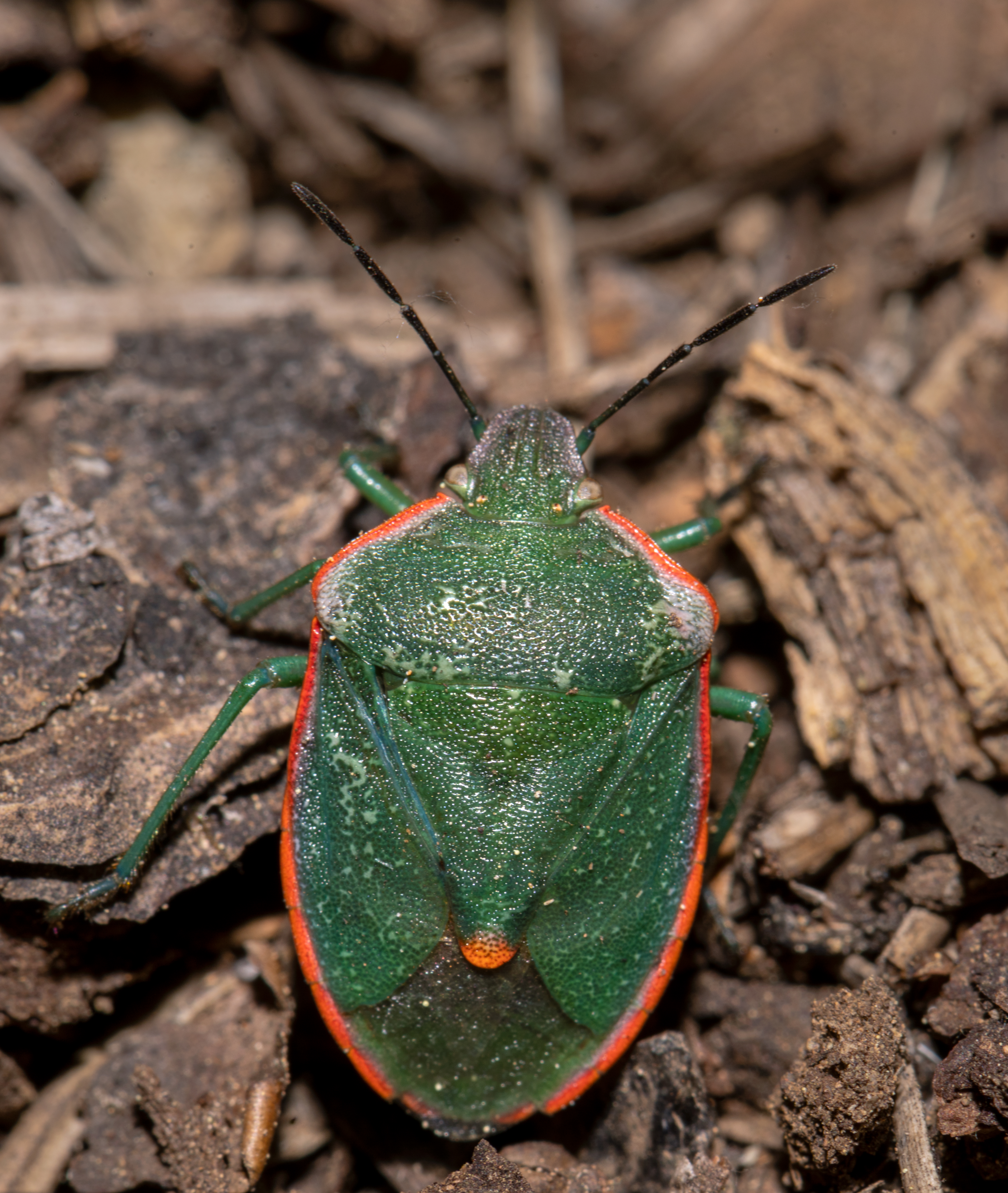
- Chlorochroa sp. (likely ligata or kanei)

Scientific classification
- Domain: Eukaryota
- Kingdom: Animalia
- Phylum: Arthropoda
- Class: Insecta
- Order: Hemiptera
- Suborder: Heteroptera
- Family: Pentatomidae
- Subfamily: Pentatominae
- Tribe: Nezarini
- Genus: Chlorochroa; Stål, 1872

Synonyms
- Pitedia Reuter, 1888

= Chlorochroa =

Genus of true bugs

Chlorochroa is a genus of shield (stink) bugs in the family Pentatomidae, found in Europe and North America. There are over 20 described species in Chlorochroa.

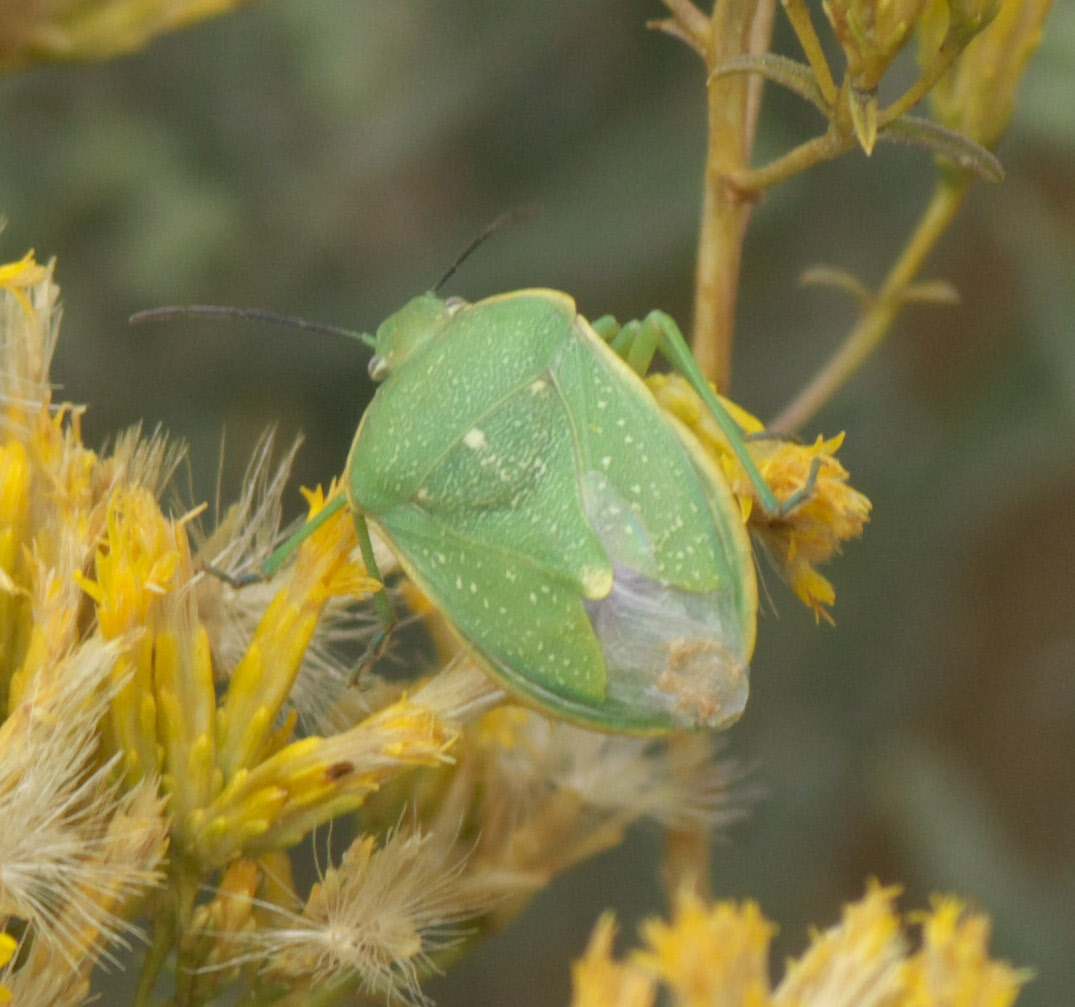
Chlorochroa uhleri

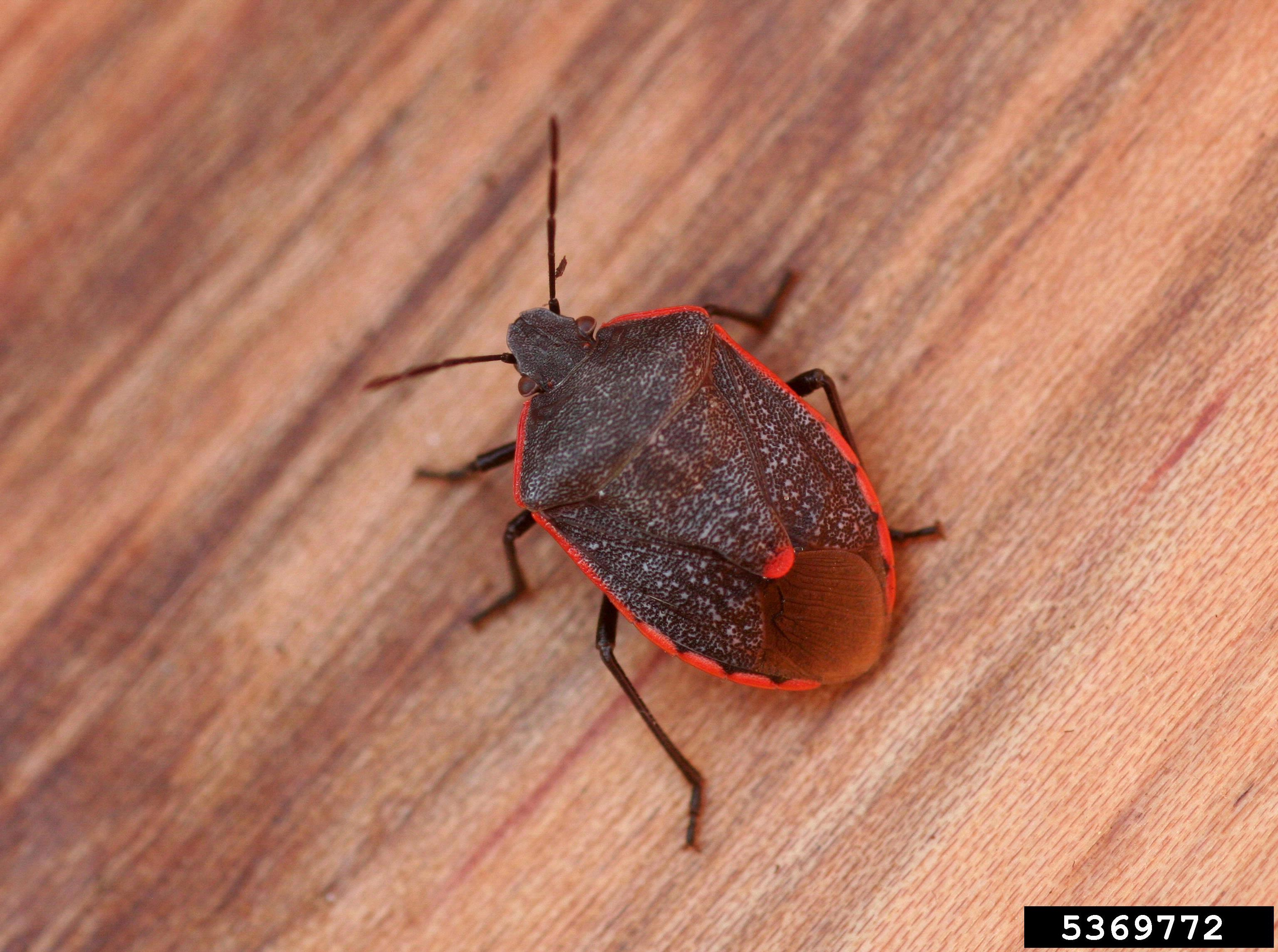
Chlorochroa ligata

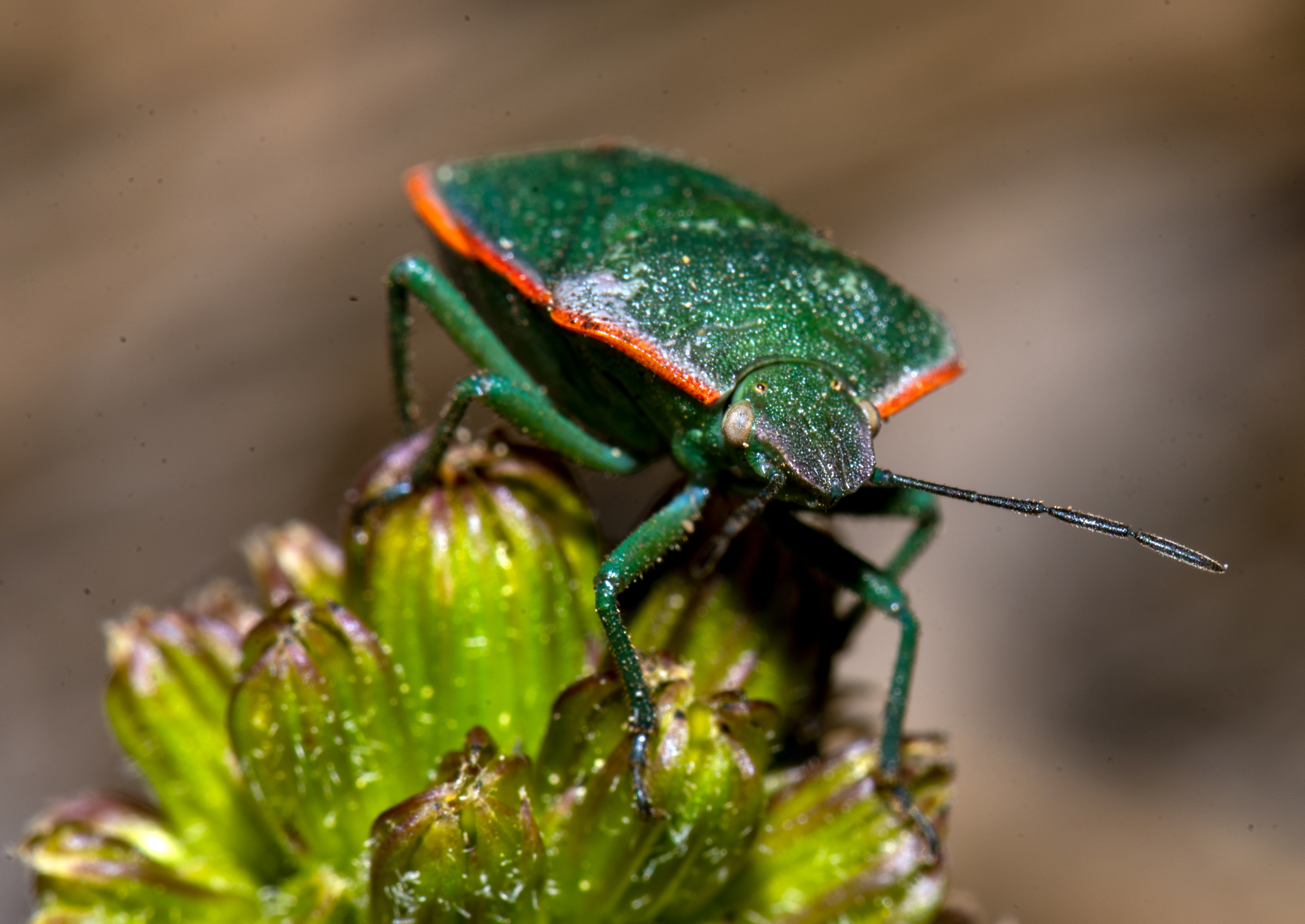
Chlorochroa sp.

== Description ==
Adult Chlorochroa range in size from 8-19 mm long and are broadly oval in shape. They are green to brownish or almost black in colour, and have a pale red/yellow/whitish margin around the body excluding the head. For at least some species, colouration varies with latitude, being darker in the south and greener in the north. The scutellum is long and triangular, sometimes has three bumps along the base and usually the tip is paler than the rest. The forewing membrane is often translucent.

Nymphal Chlorochroa are mostly black except (as in adults) for a yellow/white margin around the body excluding the head.

Different species of Chlorochroa look very similar. They are distinguished mainly by the shape of the male genitalia and, to a lesser extent, by their distributions.

== Diet ==
Chlorochroa feed on a range of different plants including apple, cotton, grape, English holly, Himalayan blackberry, hawthorn, arborvitae, groundsel, clover, alfalfa and cocklebur.

== Life cycle ==
The life cycle consists of the three stages of egg, nymph and adult. There are five nymphal instars.

== Species ==
- Chlorochroa belfragii (Stål, 1872)
- Chlorochroa congrua Uhler, 1876
- Chlorochroa dismalia Thomas, 1983
- Chlorochroa faceta (Say, 1825)
- Chlorochroa granulosa (Uhler, 1872)
- Chlorochroa juniperina (Linnaeus, 1758)
- Chlorochroa kanei Buxton & Thomas, 1983
- Chlorochroa ligata (Say, 1832) (conchuela bug)
- Chlorochroa lineata Thomas, 1983
- Chlorochroa norlandi Buxton and Thomas, 1983
- Chlorochroa opuntiae Esselbaugh, 1948
- Chlorochroa osborni (Van Duzee, 1904)
- Chlorochroa persimilis Horvath, 1908
- Chlorochroa pinicola (Mulsant & Rey, 1852)
- Chlorochroa reuteriana (Kirkaldy, 1909)
- Chlorochroa rita (Van Duzee, 1934)
- Chlorochroa rossiana Buxton & Thomas, 1983
- Chlorochroa saucia (Say, 1832)
- Chlorochroa sayi (Stål, 1872) (Say's stink bug)
- Chlorochroa senilis (Say, 1832)
- Chlorochroa uhleri (Stål, 1872) (Uhler's stink bug)
- Chlorochroa viridicata (Walker, 1867)
