= Chlorochroa senilis =

Scientific classification
- Domain: Eukaryota
- Kingdom: Animalia
- Phylum: Arthropoda
- Class: Insecta
- Order: Hemiptera
- Suborder: Heteroptera
- Family: Pentatomidae
- Genus: Chlorochroa
- Species: C. senilis

Binomial name
- Chlorochroa senilis (Say, 1832)

Species of true bug

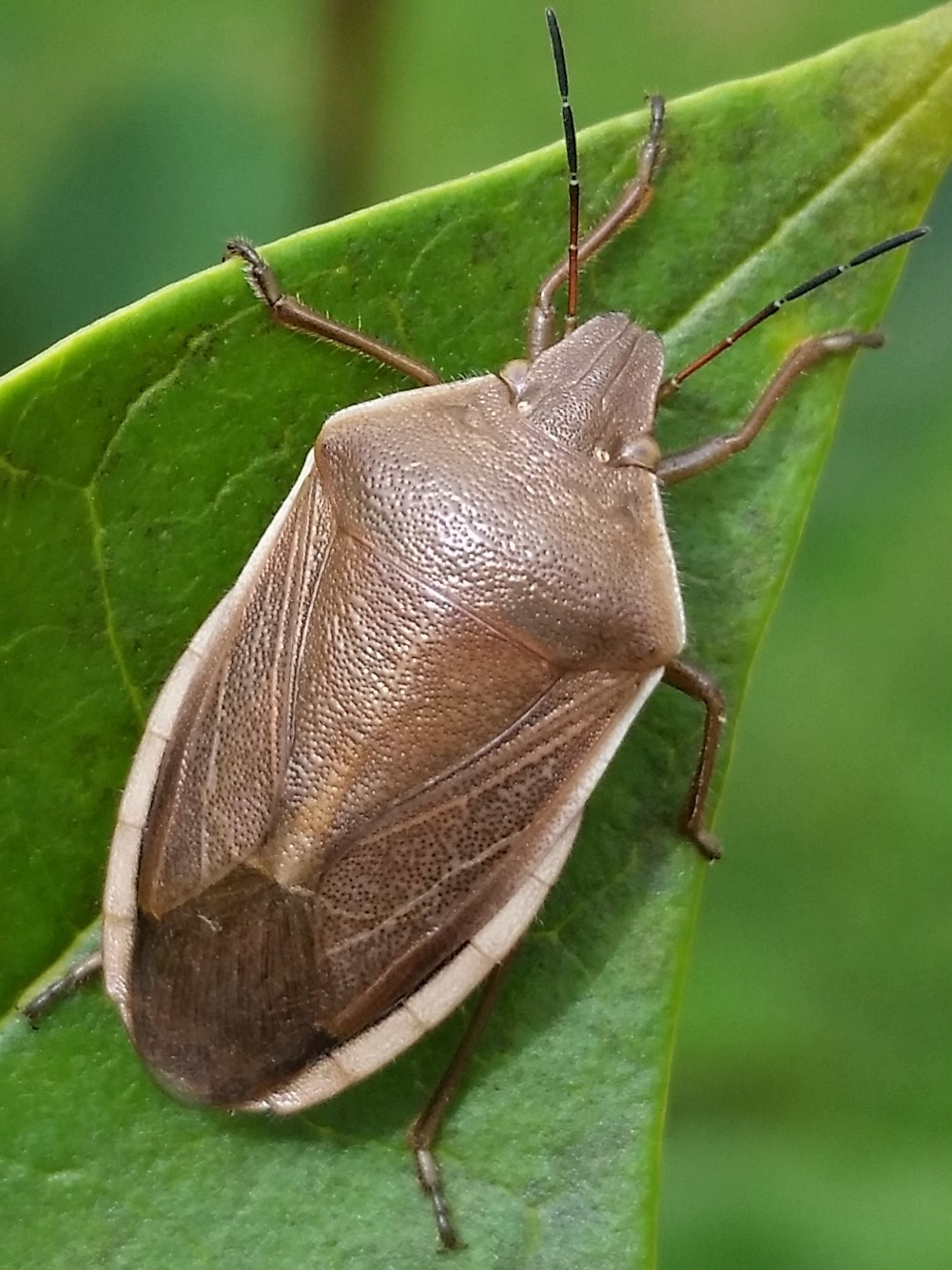

Chlorochroa senilis is a species of stink bug in the family Pentatomidae. It is found in North America.
