= Chlorochroa opuntiae =

Scientific classification
- Domain: Eukaryota
- Kingdom: Animalia
- Phylum: Arthropoda
- Class: Insecta
- Order: Hemiptera
- Suborder: Heteroptera
- Family: Pentatomidae
- Tribe: Nezarini
- Genus: Chlorochroa
- Species: C. opuntiae

Binomial name
- Chlorochroa opuntiae Esselbaugh, 1948

Species of true bug

Chlorochroa opuntiae is a species of stink bug in the family Pentatomidae. It is found in North America.
