= Neurothrips =

Scientific classification
- Kingdom: Animalia
- Phylum: Arthropoda
- Class: Insecta
- Order: Thysanoptera
- Family: Phlaeothripidae
- Subfamily: Phlaeothripinae
- Genus: Neurothrips; Hood, 1924

Species
- See text

Genus of thrips

Neurothrips is a genus of tube-tailed thrips in the family Phlaeothripidae. There are about six described species in Neurothrips.

== Species ==
These six species belong to the genus Neurothrips:

- Neurothrips allopterus Hood
- Neurothrips apache Hood, 1957
- Neurothrips frontalis Hood
- Neurothrips magnafemoralis (Hinds, 1902)
- Neurothrips punanus Stannard
- Neurothrips williamsi Hood
