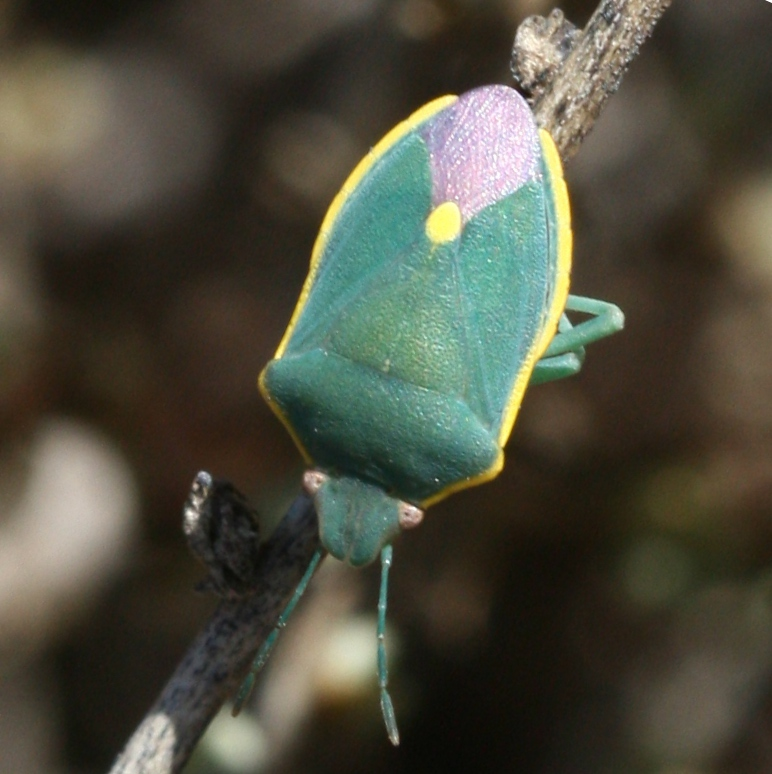

Scientific classification
- Kingdom: Animalia
- Phylum: Arthropoda
- Class: Insecta
- Order: Hemiptera
- Suborder: Heteroptera
- Family: Pentatomidae
- Subfamily: Pentatominae
- Tribe: Nezarini
- Genus: Brachynema; Mulsant & Rey, 1852

= Brachynema (bug) =

Genus of true bugs

Brachynema is a genus of stinkbugs in the family Pentatomidae.
