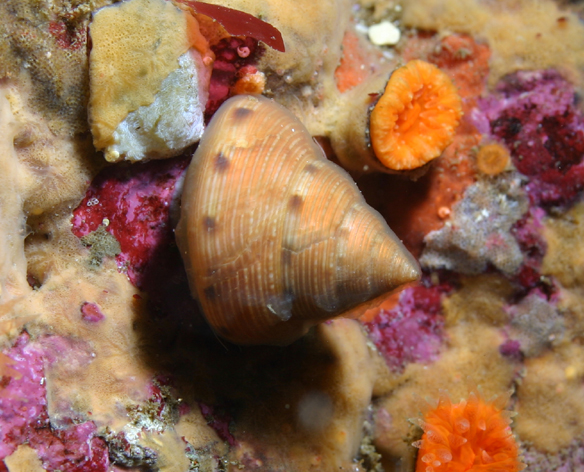

Scientific classification
- Domain: Eukaryota
- Kingdom: Animalia
- Phylum: Mollusca
- Class: Gastropoda
- Subclass: Vetigastropoda
- Order: Trochida
- Superfamily: Trochoidea
- Family: Calliostomatidae
- Genus: Calliostoma
- Species: C. gloriosum

Binomial name
- Calliostoma gloriosum Dall, 1871

= Calliostoma gloriosum =

Species of gastropod

Calliostoma gloriosum, common name the glorious topsnail, is a species of small sea snail with gills and an operculum, a marine gastropod mollusk in the family Calliostomatidae, the calliostoma top snails.

== Description ==
The height of the shell attains 24 mm. The acute shell contain six gently rounded whorls with fine, revolving, thread-like ribs. Four or five ribs near the suture are granulated. The body whorl is roundly carinated. The base of the shell is flattened, with about twenty-five revolving striae. The thick columella is not reflected, but its base is somewhat grooved or depressed behind it. The aperture is about one-third of the length of the whole shell. It is rhomboidal, pearly, and smooth. The shell has a beautiful light salmon color, ornamented near the suture and carina with alternate patches of light yellow and chestnut-brown.

== Distribution ==
This species occurs in the Pacific Ocean off California.

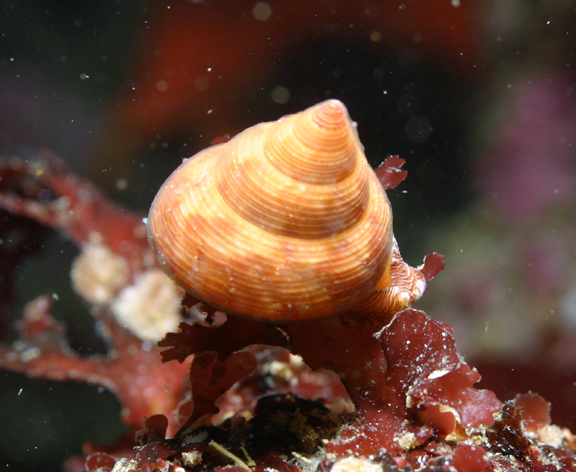
Calliostoma gloriosum
