= Neurothrips magnafemoralis =

Scientific classification
- Kingdom: Animalia
- Phylum: Arthropoda
- Class: Insecta
- Order: Thysanoptera
- Family: Phlaeothripidae
- Genus: Neurothrips
- Species: N. magnafemoralis

Binomial name
- Neurothrips magnafemoralis (Hinds, 1902)

Species of thrip

Neurothrips magnafemoralis is a species of tube-tailed thrip in the family Phlaeothripidae. It is found in Central America, North America, and Oceania.
