= Neothremma siskiyou =

Scientific classification
- Kingdom: Animalia
- Phylum: Arthropoda
- Clade: Pancrustacea
- Class: Insecta
- Order: Trichoptera
- Family: Uenoidae
- Genus: Neothremma
- Species: N. siskiyou

Binomial name
- Neothremma siskiyou Denning, 1975

Species of caddisfly

Neothremma siskiyou, the Siskiyou caddisfly, is a species of insect found in the state of California.
