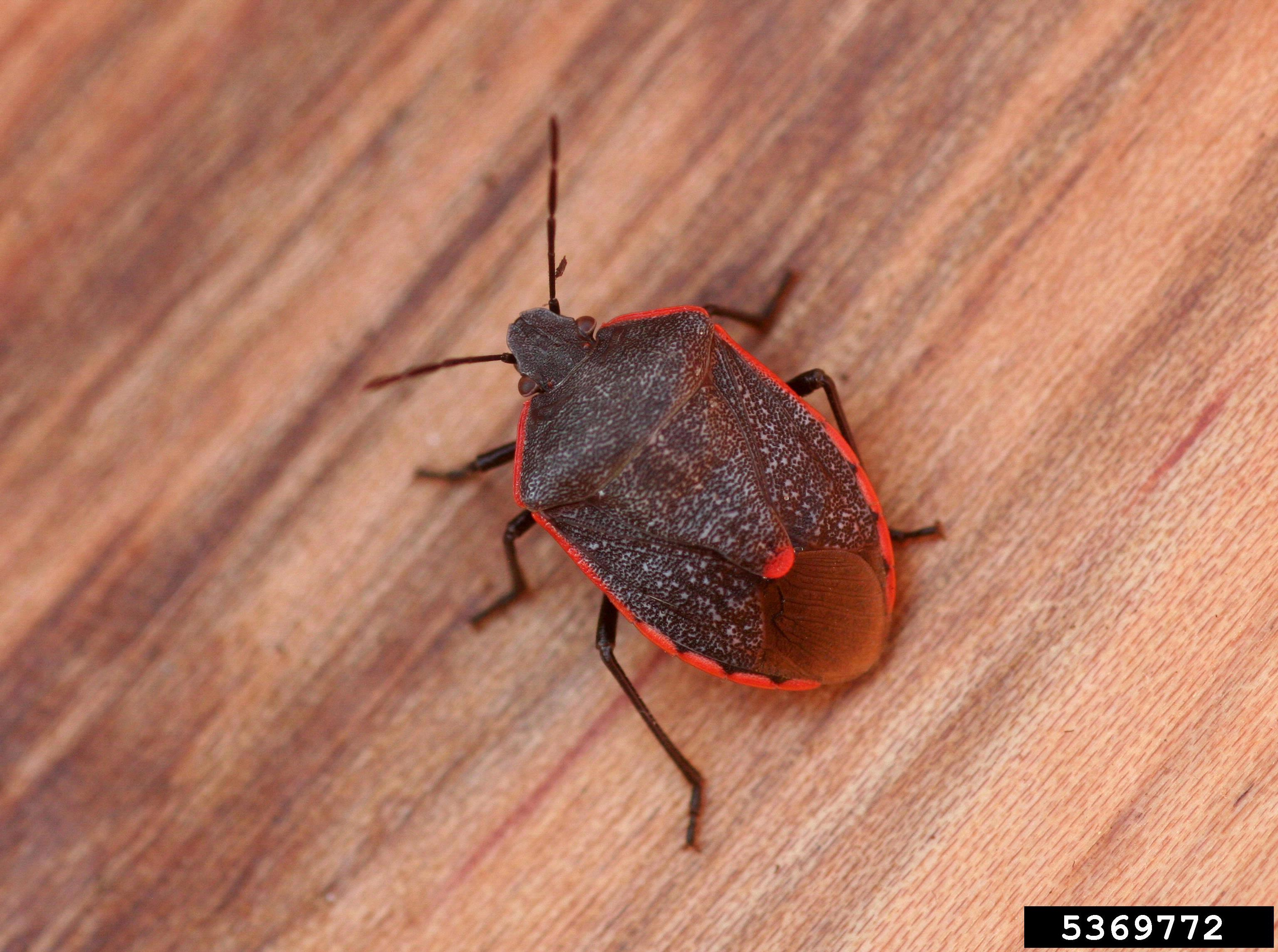

Scientific classification
- Kingdom: Animalia
- Phylum: Arthropoda
- Clade: Pancrustacea
- Class: Insecta
- Order: Hemiptera
- Suborder: Heteroptera
- Family: Pentatomidae
- Genus: Chlorochroa
- Species: C. ligata

Binomial name
- Chlorochroa ligata (Say, 1832)

Synonyms
- Pentatoma ligata Say, 1832

= Chlorochroa ligata =

Species of true bug

Chlorochroa ligata, the conchuela bug, is a species of stink bug in the family Pentatomidae. It is found in North America.
