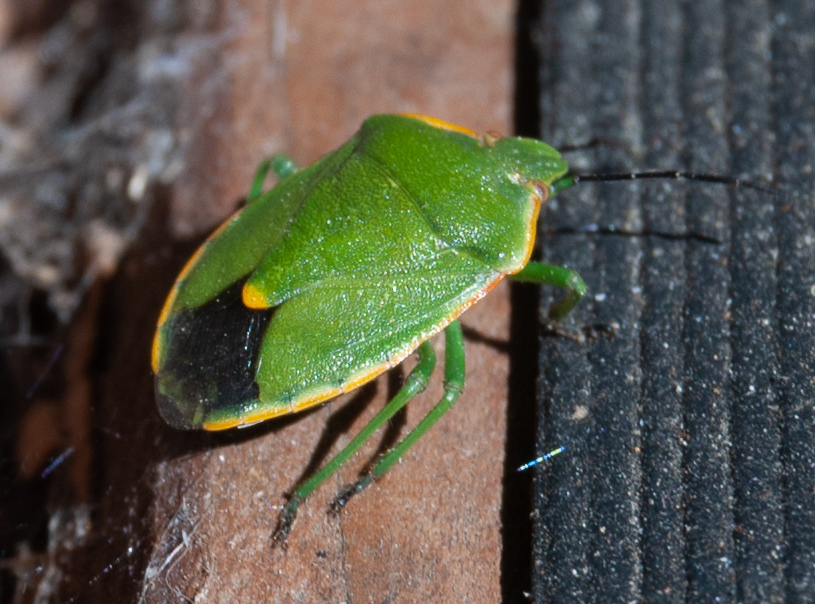

Scientific classification
- Domain: Eukaryota
- Kingdom: Animalia
- Phylum: Arthropoda
- Class: Insecta
- Order: Hemiptera
- Suborder: Heteroptera
- Family: Pentatomidae
- Genus: Chlorochroa
- Species: C. rossiana

Binomial name
- Chlorochroa rossiana Buxton & Thomas, 1983

= Chlorochroa rossiana =

Species of true bug

Chlorochroa rossiana is a species of stink bug in the family Pentatomidae. It is found in North America.
