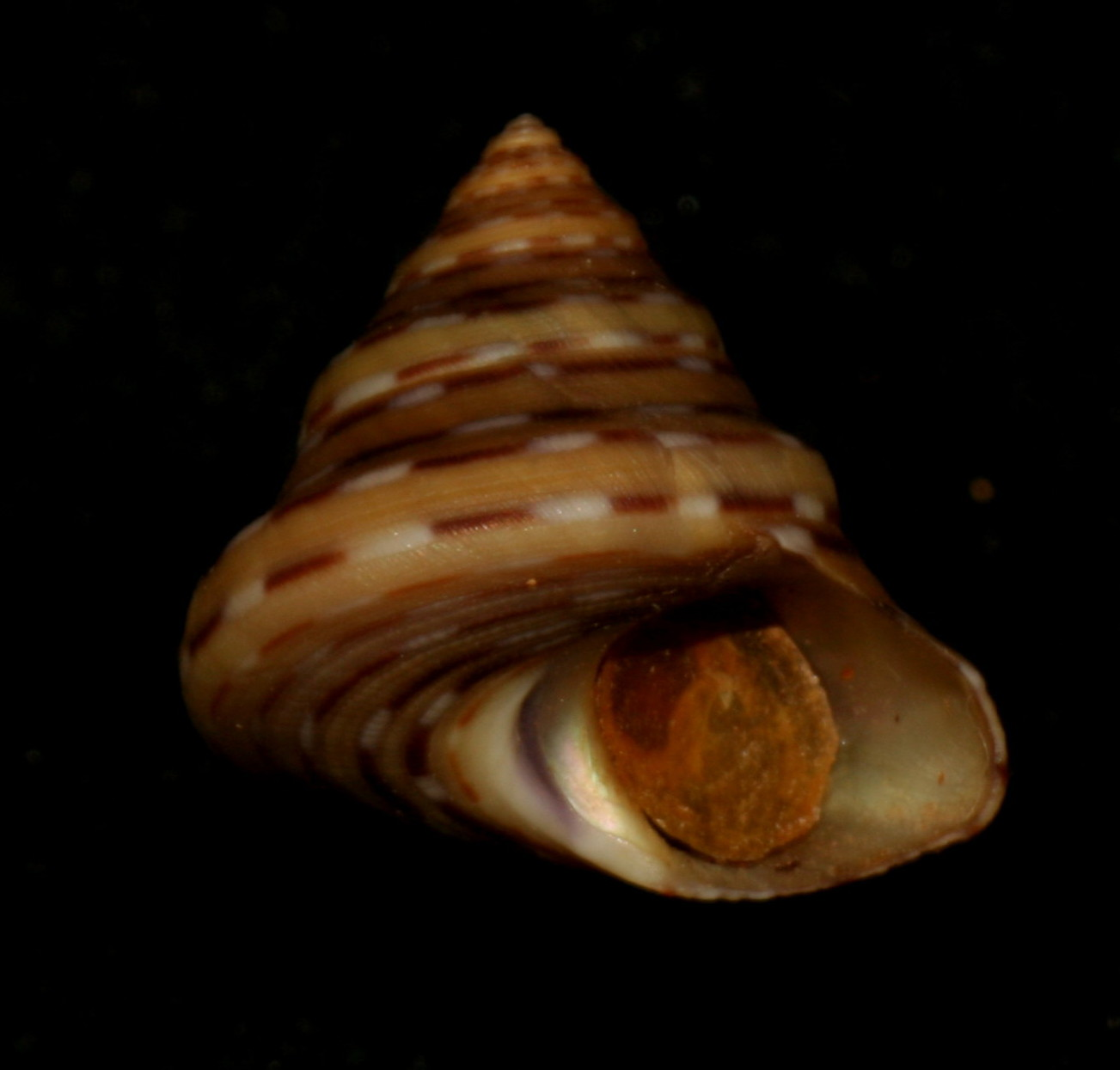
- Shell and operculum of Calliostoma tricolor Gabb, 1865, 15.9 mm height by 15.9 mm diameter, collected by scuba diver at 55 feet, Point Conception, California

Scientific classification
- Kingdom: Animalia
- Phylum: Mollusca
- Class: Gastropoda
- Subclass: Vetigastropoda
- Order: Trochida
- Family: Calliostomatidae
- Genus: Calliostoma
- Species: C. tricolor

Binomial name
- Calliostoma tricolor Gabb, 1865

= Calliostoma tricolor =

Species of gastropod

Calliostoma tricolor, common name the three-coloured top shell, is a species of sea snail, a marine gastropod mollusk in the family Calliostomatidae.

== Description ==
The rather solid, conical shell has about 7 obtusely bi-angular shouldered whorls; the upper portion of each whorl is slightly concave to flat. The superior angle is prominent on the spire whorls. The early whorls have minutely beaded threads which become smoother and appear as fine smooth spiral ribs on later whorls. The height of the shell varies between 18 mm to 25 mm. The acute apex is very minute. The surface is cut into a finely densely granulated pattern by the decussation of numerous spiral striae with close, regular, impressed lines of increment. The base of the shell is slightly convex, encircled by numerous unequal lirae. The oblique aperture is subrhomboidal. The arcuate columella is not at all truncate at its base. Its edge is pearly, white. and backed by a curved purple streak, which is encircled by a band of bright light yellow.

The color is yellowish brown or olive-ashen with a pattern above of three or four spaced spiral rings of alternating brown and white bars. On the base of the shell there are six similarly marked rings. The shell is often obscurely clouded above with dark brown or olive, often with white spots between the dark patches.

== Distribution ==
This species occurs subtidally from San Francisco, California to San Martin Island, in northern Baja California, and is found offshore from 16 to 70 meters.
