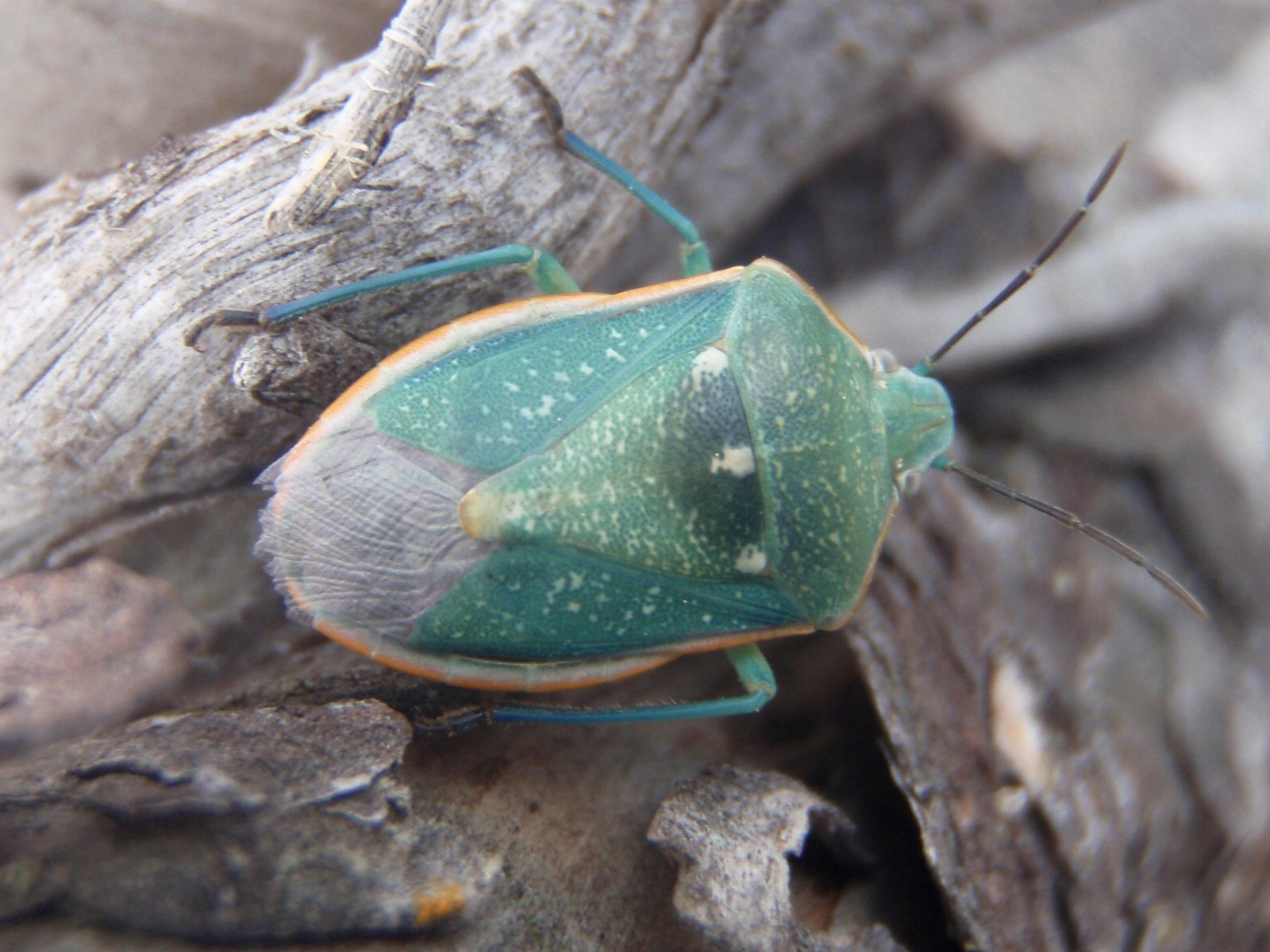

Scientific classification
- Kingdom: Animalia
- Phylum: Arthropoda
- Clade: Pancrustacea
- Class: Insecta
- Order: Hemiptera
- Suborder: Heteroptera
- Family: Pentatomidae
- Genus: Chlorochroa
- Species: C. sayi

Binomial name
- Chlorochroa sayi (Stål, 1872)

Synonyms
- Lioderma sayi Stål 1872; Chlorochroa sayii Patton & Mail 1935 (missp.)

= Chlorochroa sayi =

Species of true bug

Chlorochroa sayi, or Say's stink bug, is a species of stink bug in the family Pentatomidae. It is found in North America.
