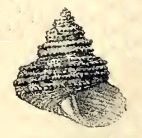
- Drawing with an apertural view of a shell of Calliostoma gemmulatum

Scientific classification
- Kingdom: Animalia
- Phylum: Mollusca
- Class: Gastropoda
- Subclass: Vetigastropoda
- Order: Trochida
- Family: Calliostomatidae
- Genus: Calliostoma
- Species: C. gemmulatum

Binomial name
- Calliostoma gemmulatum (Carpenter, 1864)

Synonyms
- Calliostoma formosa (Mighels, 1842)

= Calliostoma gemmulatum =

Species of gastropod

Calliostoma gemmulatum, common name the western gem top shell, is a species of sea snail, a marine gastropod mollusk in the family Calliostomatidae.

== Description ==
The size of the shell varies between 13 mm and 25 mm. The solid but rather thin, imperforate, shell has a conic-elevated shape. It is greenish olive, with narrow irregular longitudinal blackish-olive stripes. The seven strongly convex whorls have a rounded form. They are separated by deep sutures, encircled by three principal granulose carinae, the base and interstices with smaller lirulae and regular incremental striae. The whorls of the spire contain two strong, granose carinae. The body whorl is more rounded at the periphery than is usual in Calliostoma. The base of the shell is rather flattened, with about 10 concentric lirae, dotted with brown. The iridescent aperture is rounded-quadrangular. The columella is pearly, iridescent, not truncate below, and bounded outside by a whitish-yellow streak.

== Distribution ==
This marine species occurs from California, USA, to the Gulf of California, Mexico.

== Bibliography ==
- Carpenter P. P. (1864). Supplementary report on the present state of our knowledge with regard to the Mollusca of the west coast of North America. Reports of the British Association for the Advancement of Science (1863) 33: 517–686-page(s): 612, 653
