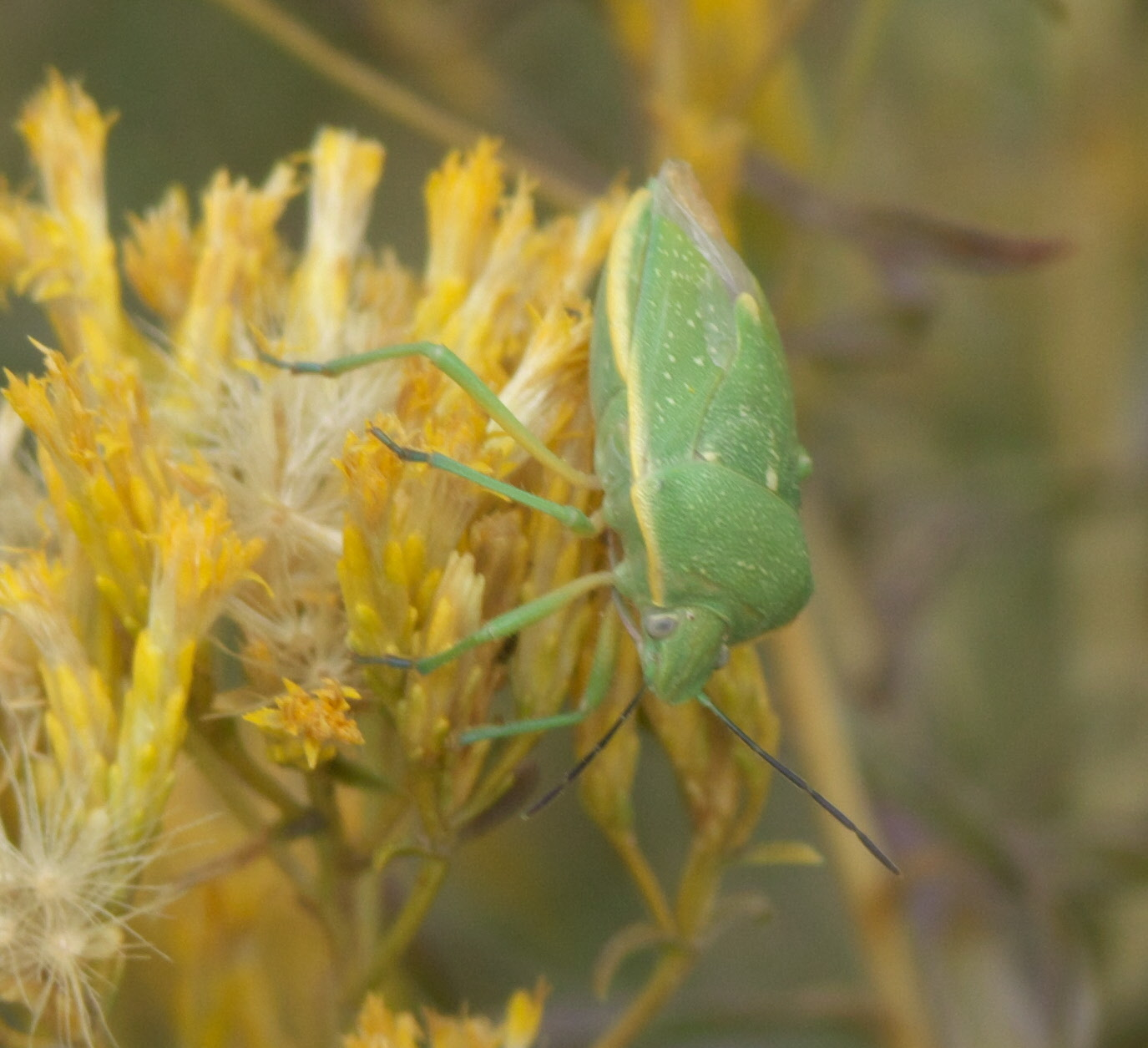

Scientific classification
- Kingdom: Animalia
- Phylum: Arthropoda
- Clade: Pancrustacea
- Class: Insecta
- Order: Hemiptera
- Suborder: Heteroptera
- Family: Pentatomidae
- Tribe: Nezarini
- Genus: Chlorochroa
- Species: C. uhleri

Binomial name
- Chlorochroa uhleri (Stål, 1872)

= Chlorochroa uhleri =

Species of insect

Chlorochroa uhleri, or Uhler's stink bug, is a species of stink bug in the family Pentatomidae. It is found in Central America and North America.

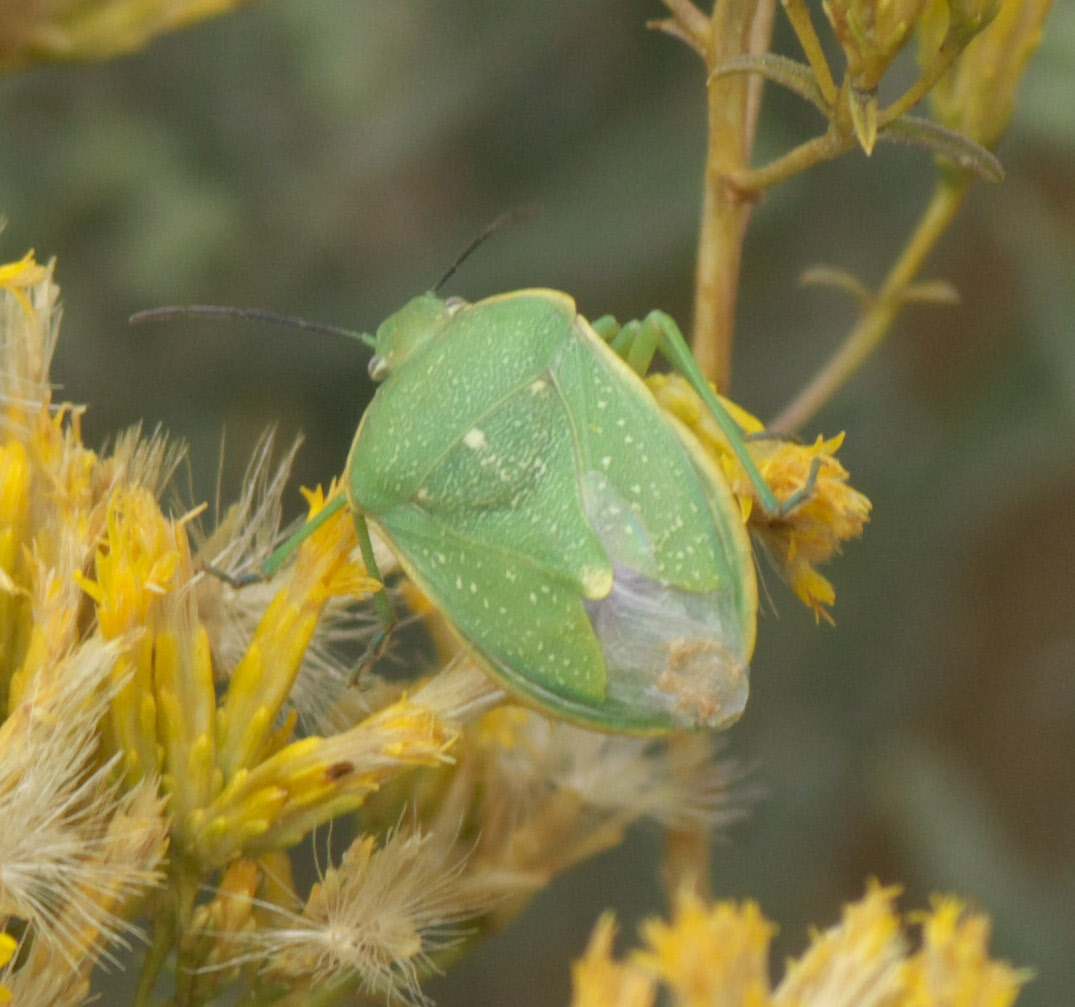
Uhler's stink bug, Chlorochroa uhleri
