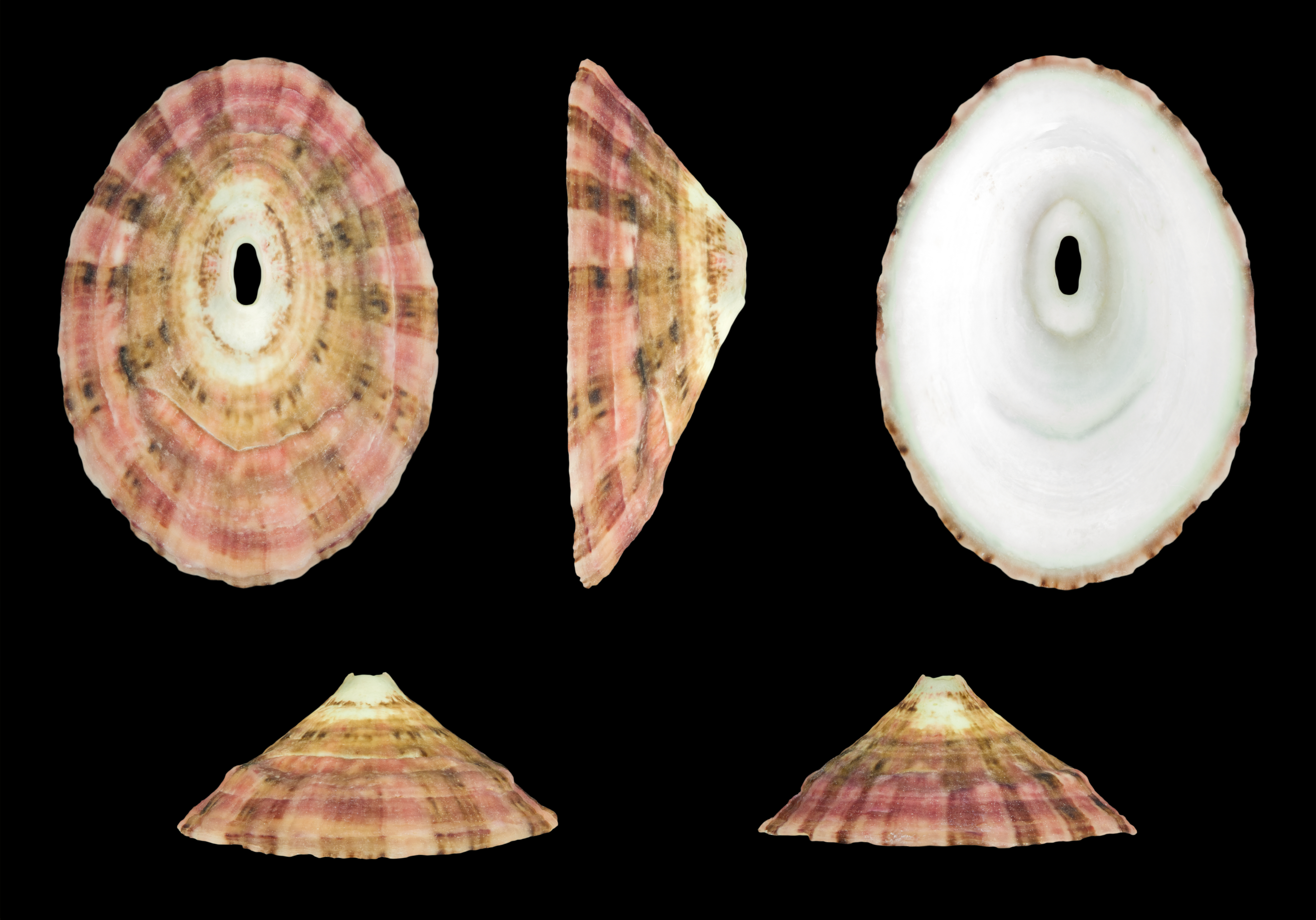
- A shell of Fissurella volcano

Scientific classification
- Kingdom: Animalia
- Phylum: Mollusca
- Class: Gastropoda
- Subclass: Vetigastropoda
- Order: Lepetellida
- Family: Fissurellidae
- Genus: Fissurella
- Species: F. volcano

Binomial name
- Fissurella volcano Reeve, 1849

= Fissurella volcano =

Species of gastropod

Fissurella volcano, commonly named the volcano limpet or volcano keyhole limpet, is a species of small to medium-sized sea snails, marine gastropod mollusks in the family Fissurellidae, the keyhole limpets. Like other members of the keyhole limpet family, the volcano limpet is not considered a "true" limpet.

Adults measure up to approximately 2.5-4.1 cm with a keyhole-shaped pore on the apex of its conical shell. They feed on benthic microalgae and potentially some macroalgal, or seaweed, fronds.

This species occurs in the Western Pacific Ocean, where it is found in the intertidal zone on the underside of rocks. The distribution is California and Baja California.
