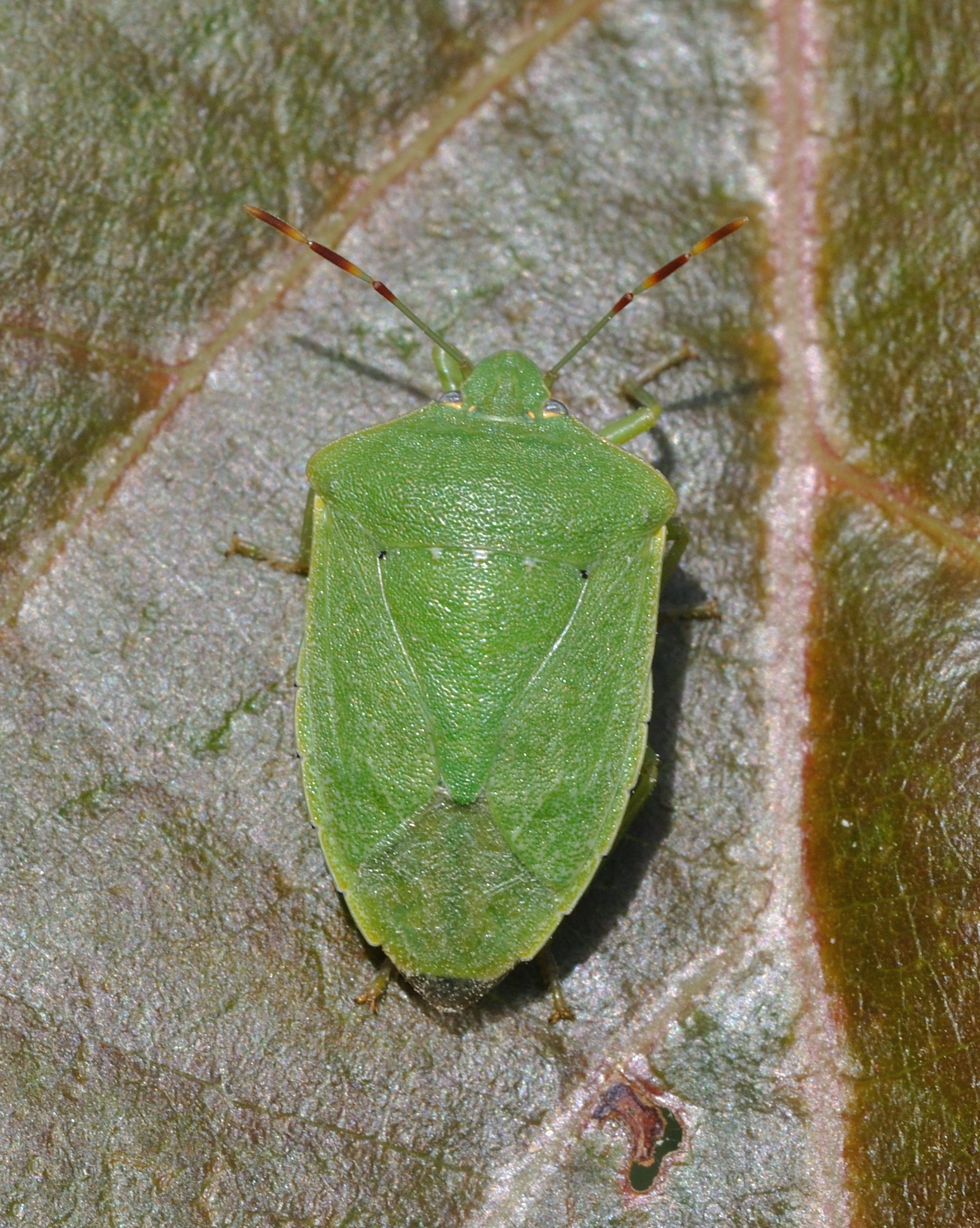
- Nezara viridula

Scientific classification
- Kingdom: Animalia
- Phylum: Arthropoda
- Class: Insecta
- Order: Hemiptera
- Suborder: Heteroptera
- Family: Pentatomidae
- Subfamily: Pentatominae
- Tribe: Nezarini

= Nezarini =

Tribe of true bugs

Nezarini is a tribe of stink bugs in the family Pentatomidae.

== Genera ==
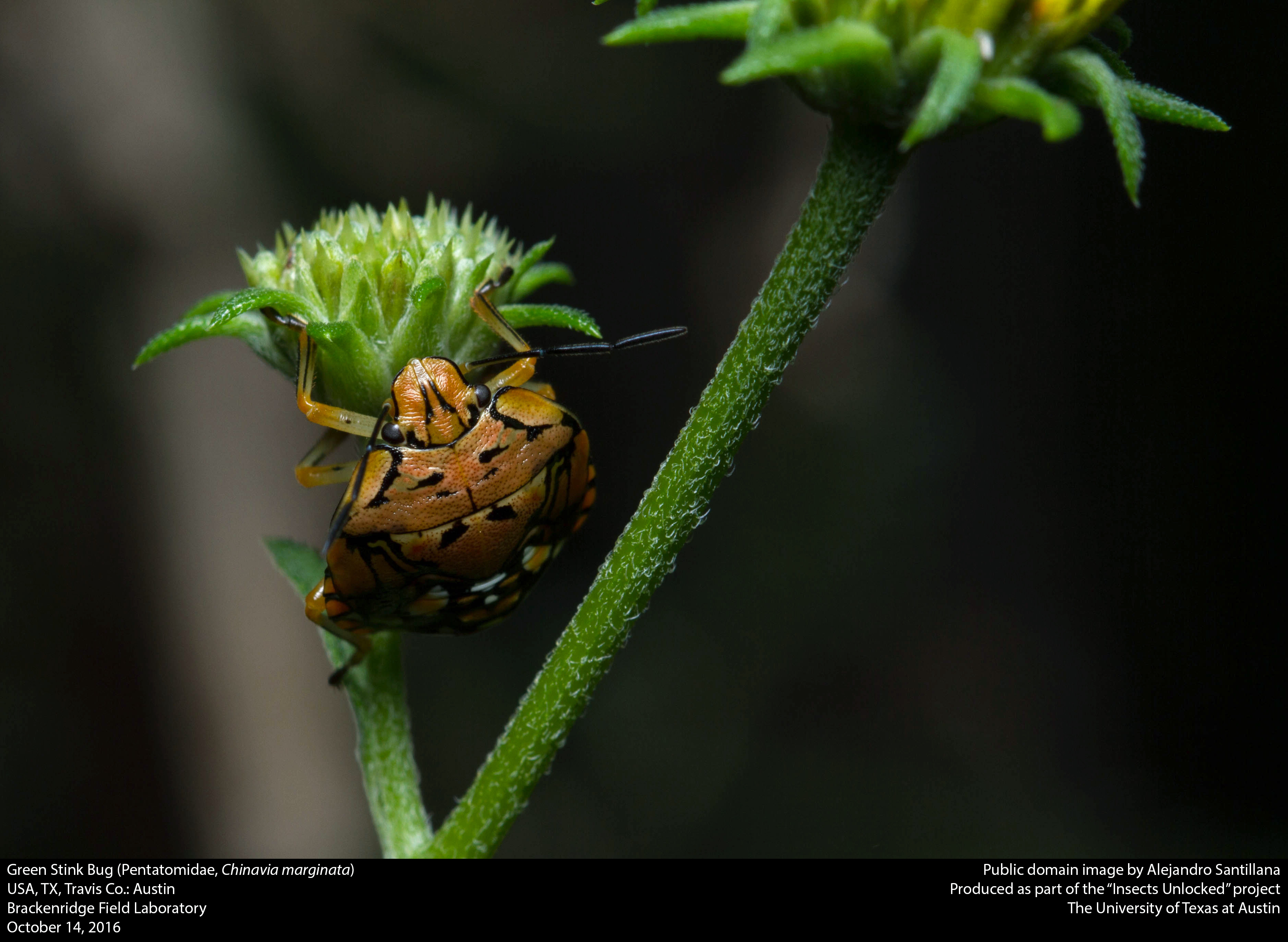
Chinavia marginata

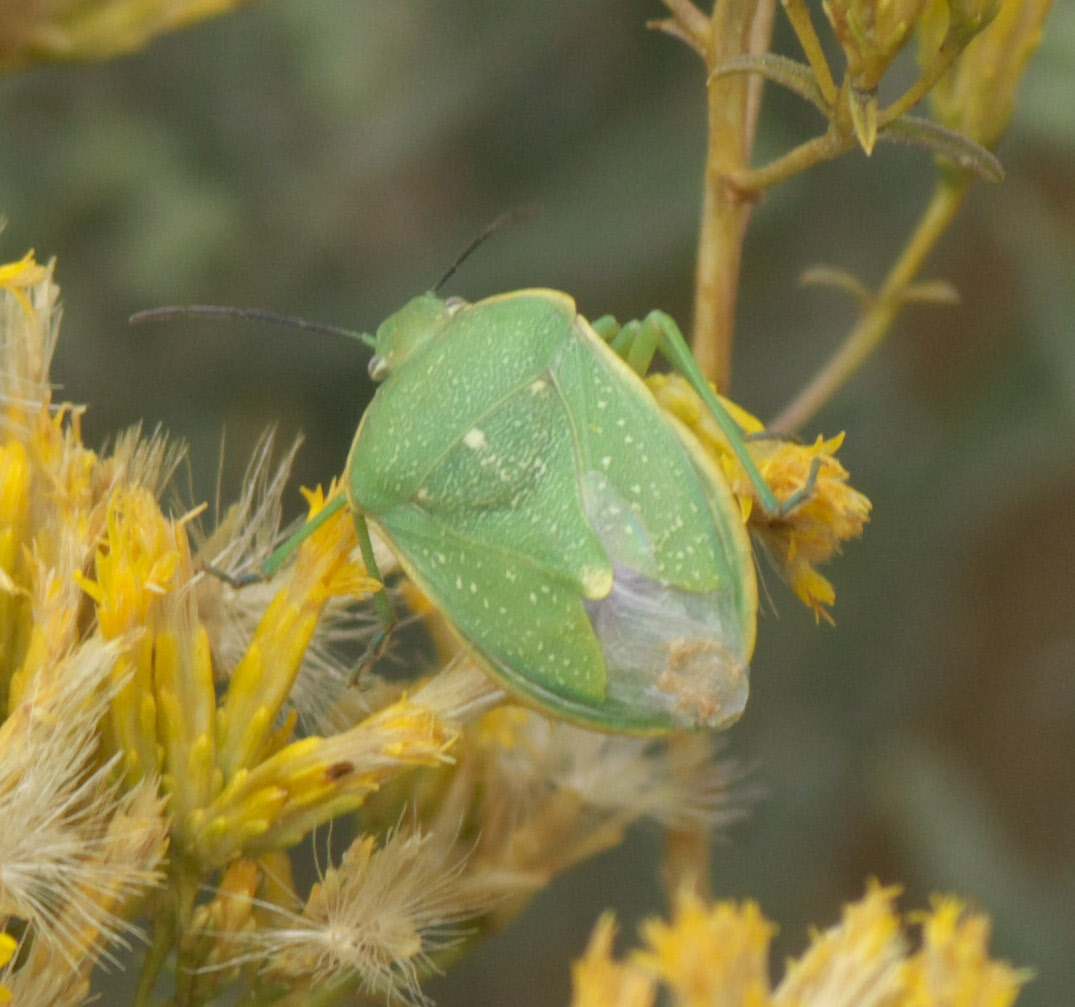
Chlorochroa uhleri

There are at least 21 described genera in the Nezarini including:

- Acrosternum Fieber, 1860
- Acrozangis Breddin, 1900
- Aesula Stål, 1876
- Aethemenes Stål, 1876
- Alciphron Stål, 1876
- Amblybelus Montrouzier, 1864
- Brachynema Mulsant et Rey, 1852
- Cellobius Jakovlev, 1885
- Chalazonotum Ribes et Schmitz, 1992
- Chinavia Orian, 1965
- Chlorochroa Stål, 1872
- Chroantha Stål, 1872
- Glaucias Kirkaldy, 1908
- Kurumana Linnavuori, 1972
- Neoacrosternum Day, 1965
- Nezara Amyot et Serville, 1843
- Palomena Mulsant et Rey, 1866
- Parachinavia Roche, 1977
- Pseudoacrosternum Day, 1965
- Roferta Rolston, 1981
