= Reeves and Sons =

Reeves
- Formerly: Reeves and Sons
- Company type: Private (1766–1974); Subsidiary (1974–76)
- Industry: Art materials
- Founded: 1766; 260 years ago in London, U.K.
- Founder: William Reeves
- Headquarters: London, United Kingdom
- Products: Watercolour, acrylic paint, brushes, papers, colored pencils, oil pastel, pencils
- Owner: ColArt Fine Art and Graphics (owned by Lindéngruppen)
- Website: myreeves.com

Reeves is an English art materials brand and manufacturing company established by William Reeves (1739–1803) in 1766. Reeves is credited with having invented the soluble watercolour.

Alongside soluble watercolour, Reeves manufactured resins, pigments and oils, but it was the Reeves watercolour paint cakes that brought growth to the company. Introduced in 1780, these provided artists with pre-prepared watercolour, which combined binding medium and pigments, reducing the need for artists to prepare this themselves. These were produced using honey, preserving moisture and providing durability.

A box of watercolour paints, manufactured by Reeves, belonged to a relative of Captain James Cook, Isaac Smith, who used them on the first voyage of the Resolution (1772–1775). It had twelve colours, a mussel shell for mixing, two ivory brush stands and seven paint brushes.

The brand is best known for its "Reeves" brand of artists' acrylic and watercolor paints. The firm has gone through various name changes during its history, listed as follows:

- Thomas Reeves and Son 1784–1799
- W. J. Reeves 1799–1800
- Reeves and Woodyer 1800–1816
- Reeves, Woodyer and Reeves 1817–1818
- W. J. Reeves and Son 1819–1829
- Reeves and Sons 1830–1890
- Reeves and Sons Ltd 1891–1976

In 1974, the company was acquired by Reckitt and Colman. It may have been this change in ownership that led to Reeves printed catalogues and material being gifted to the Museum of London in 1974.

Reckitt and Colman later went on (in 1976) to purchase Winsor and Newton. In 1991, ownership of the "Reeves" brand was acquired by Lindéngruppen, a family owned business, through Swedish conglomerate ColArt, which is a certified B corporation.

Reeves was revived as an actively used brand name in 1995. In a recent guide to art materials, it was suggested that Reeves is suitable for beginners and hobbyists.
