= Colart =

London based- art materials company

Colart Group
- Company type: Private
- Industry: Art materials
- Headquarters: London, England
- Area served: Worldwide
- Products: Acrylics, oils, watercolor, gouache, brushes, canvases, papers, inks, graphite and colored pencils, markers, charcoal
- Parent: Lindengruppen
- Website: www.colart.com

Colart, or the Colart Group, is a large international supplier of art materials, with subsidiaries and brands such as Winsor & Newton, Liquitex and Lefranc & Bourgeois. The group's head office is situated in London.

Colart was established in 1992 as a wholly owned subsidiary for the art materials segment of AB Wilh. Becker. As such it is also a wholly owned second-tier subsidiary of Lindéngruppen, a privately held company based in Höganäs, Sweden.

The Colart Group has ten production facilities based in the UK, France, and China.

In 2017, Colart became the main owner of Elephant Art, publisher of the art magazine Elephant.

== Brands and subsidiaries ==
- Beckers "A" – Original brand of AB Wilh. Becker, targeting the Scandinavian market. It comprises a series of artist quality oil paints and art supplies.
- Dekorima – Original art supplies brand of AB Wilh. Becker since 1970, also targeting the Scandinavian market.
- Lefranc & Bourgeois – Has a wide range of artists' paints and art supplies. Its oldest branch was established in 1720 in Paris. Acquired by AB Wilh. Becker in 1982.
- Charbonnel – Specialised in products for intaglio, lithography and gilding. Founded in 1862 in Paris. Acquired by Lefranc & Bourgeois in 1988.
- Snazaroo – Face paints. Established in 1989 and owned by Colart.
- Winsor & Newton – A wide range of artists' paints and art supplies. Founded in 1832 in London. Bought by AB Wilh. Becker in 1990.
- Reeves – A wide range of paints and supplies. Established in 1766 in London. Acquired by AB Wilh. Becker in 1991.
- Liquitex – Specialised in artists' acrylic paints and supplies around that. Was originally established as Permanent Pigments Company in 1933 in Cincinnati. Acquired by Colart in 2000.
- Conté à Paris – Specialised in pencils and crayons. Established in 1795 in Paris. Bought by Colart in 2004.
- Letraset – Originally known for dry transfer lettering and associated products. Also specialised in marker pens. Founded in 1959 in London. Acquired by Colart in 2012.
- Elephant Art – Publisher. Established in 2009. Colart became its main owner in May 2017.
