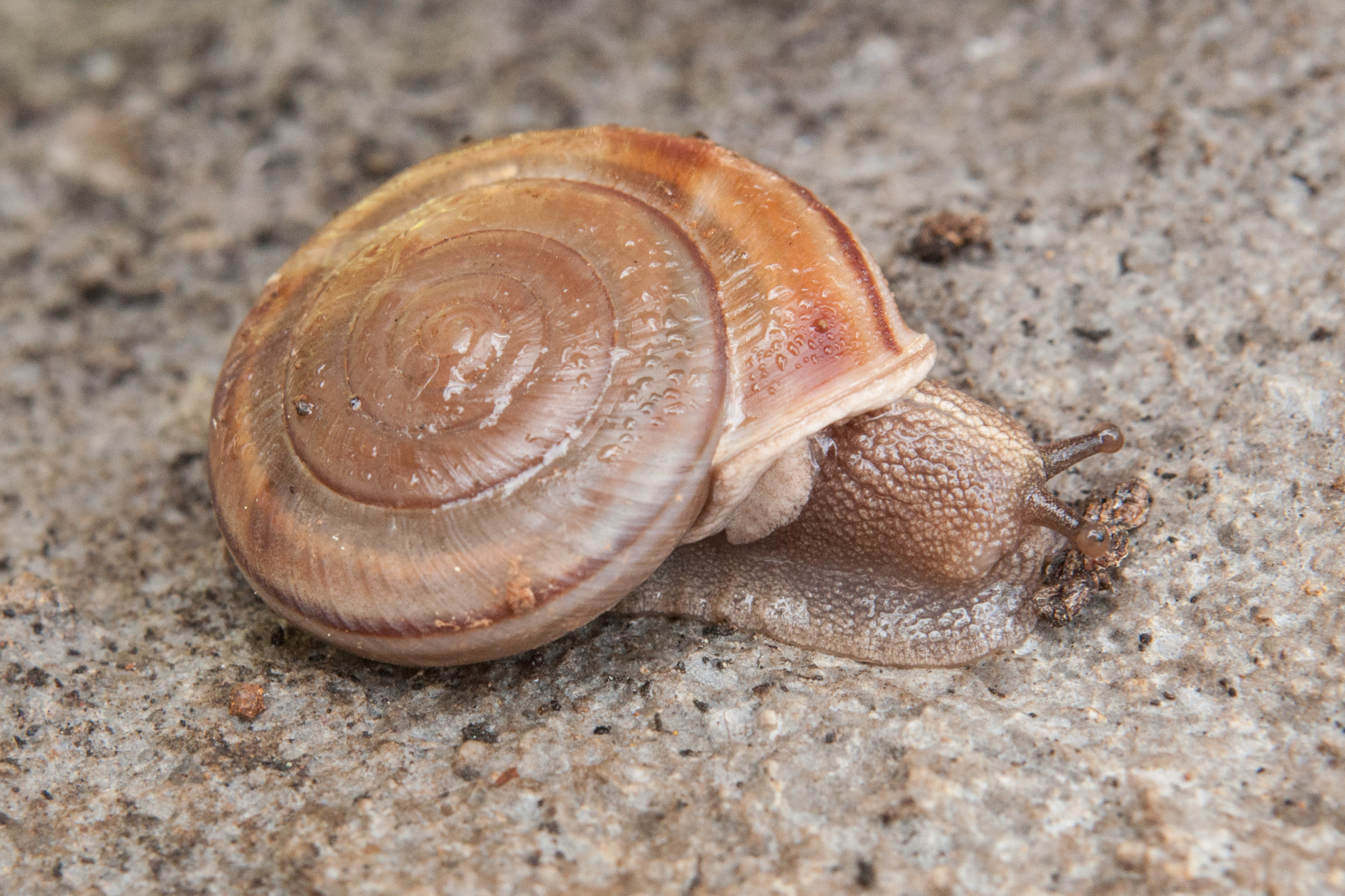

Conservation status
- Data Deficient (IUCN 2.3)

- Imperiled (NatureServe)

Scientific classification
- Kingdom: Animalia
- Phylum: Mollusca
- Class: Gastropoda
- Order: Stylommatophora
- Family: Xanthonychidae
- Genus: Monadenia
- Species: M. troglodytes

Binomial name
- Monadenia troglodytes Hanna & A.G. Smith, 1933

= Shasta sideband =

Species of gastropod

The Shasta sideband (Monadenia troglodytes) is a species of gastropod in the subfamily Monadeniinae.

This species is endemic to Northern California in the United States. It is very rare, known from only nine locations around Shasta Lake, California. It is threatened by a variety of activities, but none of its sites are protected. The USFWS recently determined that it may warrant protection under the Endangered Species Act due to threats to its habitat from the proposed raising of Shasta Dam.
