= Bristle =

Stiff hair or feather

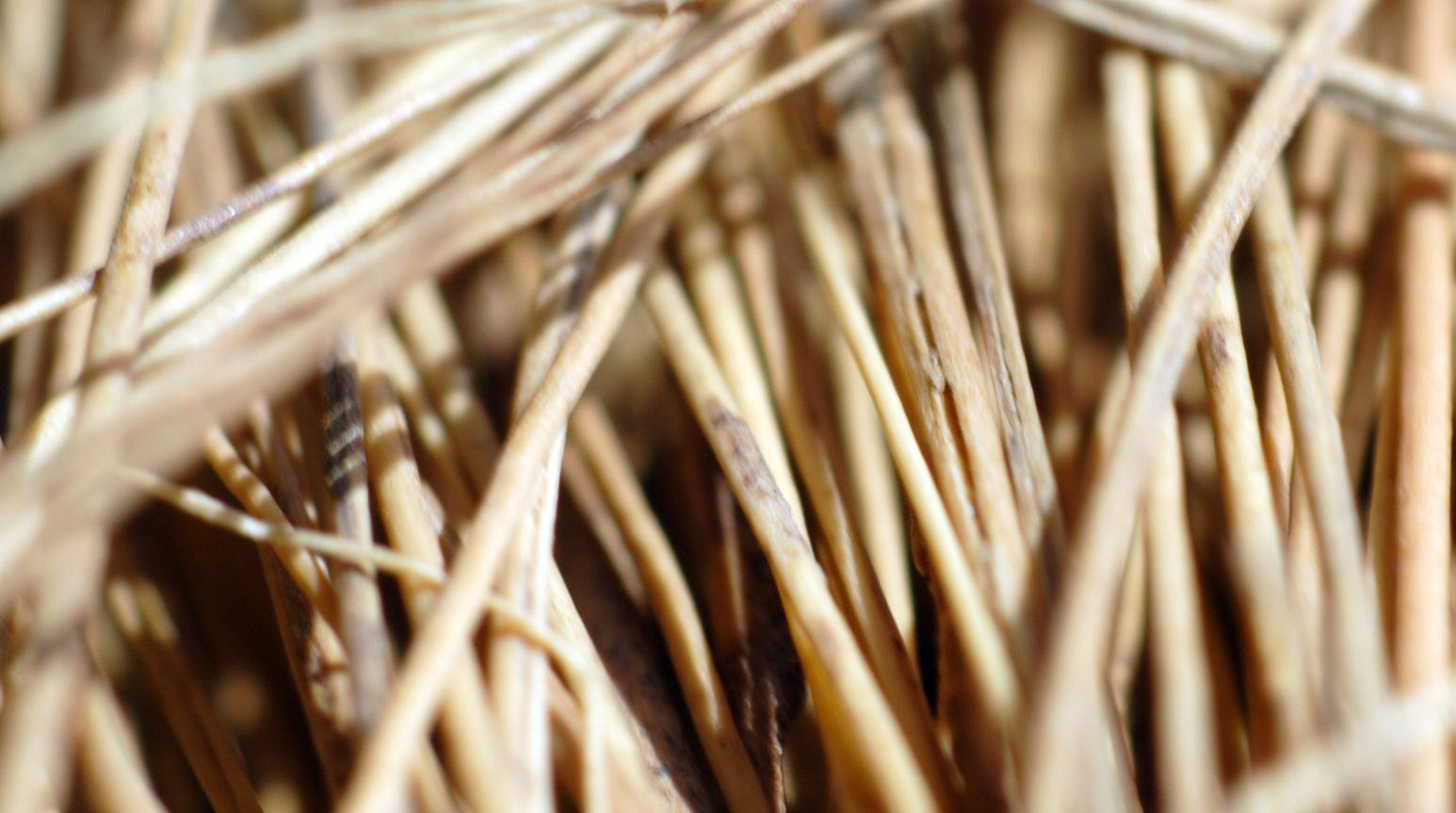
The bristles of a sweeping brush

A bristle is a stiff hair or feather (natural or artificial), either on an animal, such as a pig, a plant, or on a tool such as a brush or broom.

== Synthetic types ==
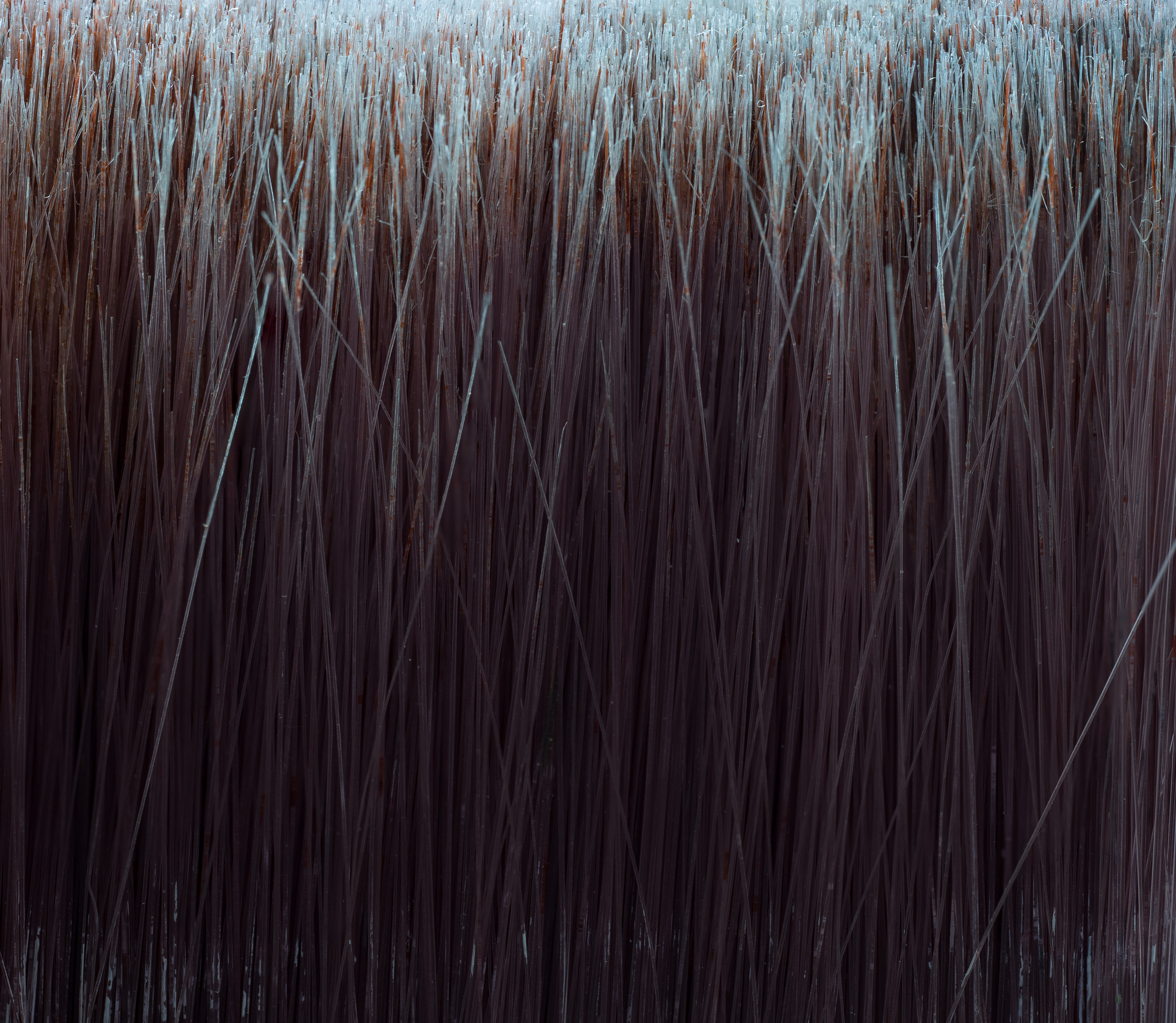
Closeup of bristles on an oil paintbrush

Synthetic materials such as nylon are also used to make bristles in items such as brooms and sweepers. Bristles are often used to make brushes for cleaning purposes, as they are strongly abrasive; common examples include the toothbrush and toilet brush. The bristle brush and the scrub brush are common household cleaning tools, often used to remove dirt or grease from pots and pans. Bristles are also used on brushes other than for cleaning, notably paintbrushes.

Bristles are distinguished as flagged (split, bushy ends) or unflagged; these are also known as flocked or unflocked bristles. In cleaning applications, flagged bristles are suited for dry cleaning (due to picking up dust better than unflagged), and unflagged suited for wet cleaning (due to flagged ends becoming dirty and matted when wet). In painting, flagged bristles yield more even application.

== Natural types ==
Bristles are found on pig breeds, instead of fur. Because the density is less than with fur, pigs are vulnerable to sunburn. One breed, the Tamworth pig, is endowed with a very dense bristle structure such that sunburn damage to skin is minimized. Animals named for their bristles include bristlebirds, the bristle-thighed curlew, the bristle-spined porcupine, and the Trinity bristle snail. Bristles also anchor worms to the soil to help them move.

== See also ==
- Paintbrush
- Bristle sensilla - tactile hairs on insects
