= Keeled sideband =

Conservation status
- Vulnerable (IUCN 2.3)

- Vulnerable (NatureServe)

Scientific classification
- Kingdom: Animalia
- Phylum: Mollusca
- Class: Gastropoda
- Order: Stylommatophora
- Family: Xanthonychidae
- Genus: Monadenia
- Species: M. circumcarinata

Binomial name
- Monadenia circumcarinata (Stearns, 1879)

Species of gastropod

The keeled sideband, scientific name Monadenia circumcarinata, is a medium-sized species of air-breathing land snail, a terrestrial pulmonate gastropod mollusk in the family Monadeniidae. This species is endemic to the United States.
