= Paintbrush =

Brush for painting

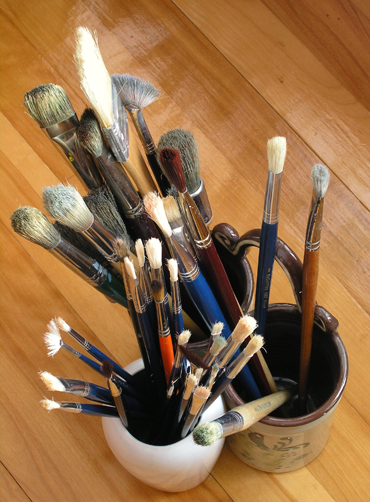
- Paintbrushes
- Classification: Brush
- Uses: Painting

A paintbrush is a brush used to apply paint or ink. A paintbrush is usually made by clamping bristles to a handle with a ferrule. They are available in various sizes, shapes, and materials. Thicker ones are used for filling in, and thinner ones are used for details. They may be subdivided into decorators' brushes used for painting and decorating and artists' brushes used for visual art.

== History ==
Paintbrushes were used by humans as early as the Paleolithic era around 2.5 million years ago in order to apply pigment.

Old painting kits, estimated to be around 100,000 years old, were discovered in a cave in what is now modern South Africa.

Ancient Egyptian paintbrushes were made of split palm leaves and used by ancestors to beautify their surroundings. The oldest brushes ever found were also made of animal hair.

== Parts ==
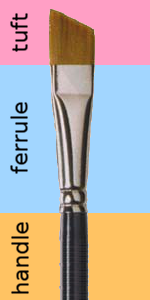
Brush parts

A paintbrush consists of three main components: the bristles, the ferrule, and the handle. The bristles, which form the tuft of the brush, are responsible for transferring paint onto the surface being painted. They may be made from natural or synthetic materials, depending on the intended application. The ferrule is the metal band that holds the bristles in place and secures them to the handle. The handle serves as the interface between the user and the tool.

== Trade ==
Brushes for use in non-artistic trade painting are geared to applying an even coat of paint to relatively large areas. Following are the globally recognized handles of trade painter's brushes:

- Gourd handle: Ergonomic design that reduces stress on the wrist and hand whilst painting.
- Short handle: The shorter handle provides greater precision when painting small spaces such as corners, trims & detail areas.
- Flat beavertail handle: This shape is rounded and slightly flattened to fit perfectly into the palm of the hand while painting.
- Square handle: The square shaped handle with bevelled corners is featured mainly in trim or sash brushes and is comfortable to hold when painting.
- Rat tail handle: This handle is longer & thinner than the standard, making it easy to hold to give the user greater control.
- Long handle: Rounded and thin, a long handle is easy to hold like a pencil, giving great control & precision when painting complex details.

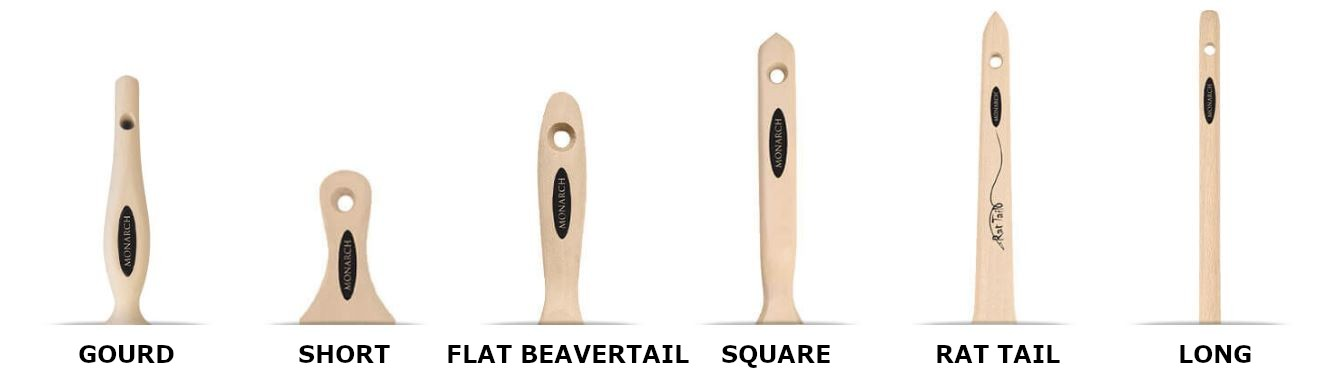
Brush handle styles

== Decorating ==
Decorators' brushes

The sizes of brushes used for painting and decorating.

=== Decorating sizes ===
Decorators' brush sizes are given in millimeters (mm) or inches (in), which refers to the width of the head. Common sizes are:

- Metric (mm): 10 • 20 • 40 • 50 • 60 • 70 • 80 • 90 • 100.
- Customary (inches): 1/8 •1/4 • 3/8 • 1/2 • 5/8 • 3/4 • 7/8 • 1 • 1 1/4 • 1 1/2 • 2 • 2 1/2 • 3 • 3 1/2 • 4.

=== Decorating shapes ===
- Angled: For painting edges, bristle length viewed from the wide face of the brush uniformly decrease from one end of the brush to the other
- Flat: For painting flat surfaces, bristle length viewed from the wide face of the brush does not change
- Tapered: Improves control, the bristle length viewed from the narrow face of the brush is longer in the center and tapers toward the edges
- Striker: Large round (cylindrical) brush for exterior painting difficult areas

=== Decorating bristles ===
Bristles may be natural or synthetic. If the filaments are synthetic, they may be made of polyester, nylon or a blend of nylon and polyester. Filaments can be hollow or solid and can be tapered or untapered. Brushes with tapered filaments give a smoother finish.

Synthetic filaments last longer than natural bristles. Natural bristles are preferred for oil-based paints and varnishes, while synthetic brushes are better for water-based paints as the bristles do not expand when wetted.

A decorator judges the quality of a brush based on several factors: filament retention, paint pickup, steadiness of paint release, brush marks, drag and precision painting. A chiseled brush permits the painter to cut into tighter corners and paint more precisely.

Brush handles may be made of wood or plastic while ferrules are metal (usually nickel-plated steel).

== Art ==
Short handled brushes are usually used for flat or slightly tilted work surfaces such as watercolor painting and ink painting, while long handled brushes are held horizontally while working on a vertical canvas such as for oil paint or acrylic paint.

=== Art shapes ===
The styles of brush tip seen most commonly are:

- Round: pointed tip, long closely arranged bristles for detail.
- Flat: for spreading paint quickly and evenly over a surface. They will have longer hairs than their Bright counterpart.
- Bright: shorter than flats. Flat brushes with short stiff bristles, good for driving paint into the weave of a canvas in thinner paint applications, as well as thicker painting styles like impasto work.
- Filbert: flat brushes with domed ends. They allow good coverage and the ability to perform some detail work.
- Fan: for blending broad areas of paint.
- Angle: like the filbert, these are versatile and can be applied in both general painting application as well as some detail work.
- Mop: a larger format brush with a rounded edge for broad soft paint application as well as for getting thinner glazes over existing drying layers of paint without damaging lower layers to protect the paintbrush
- Rigger: round brushes with longish hairs, traditionally used for painting the rigging in pictures of ships. They are useful for fine lines and are versatile for both oils and watercolors.
- Stippler and deer-foot stippler: short, stubby rounds
- Liner: elongated rounds
- Dagger: looks like angle with longish hairs, used for one stroke painting like painting long leaves.
- Scripts: highly elongated rounds
- Egbert: a filbert with extra long hair, used for oil painting

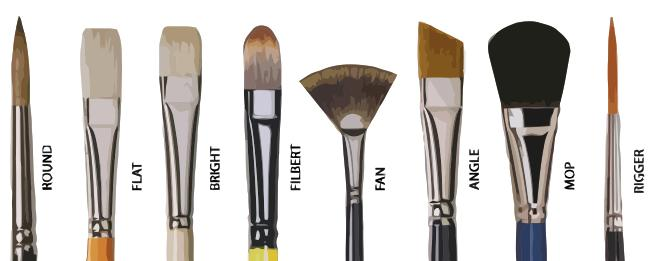
Types of brushes

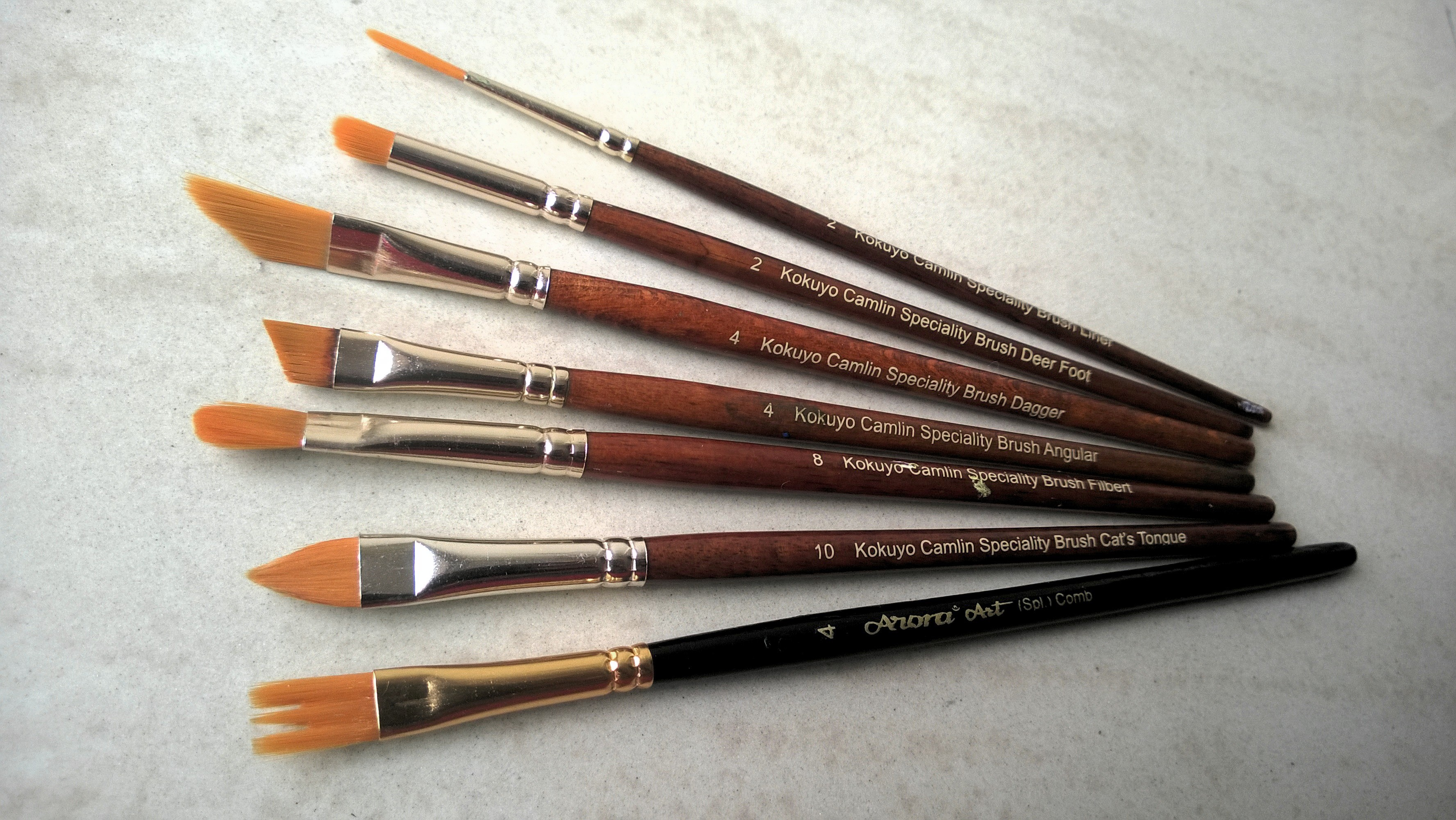
Brushes used in one stroke painting

Some other styles of brush include:

- Sumi: Similar in style to certain watercolor brushes, also with a generally thick wooden or metal handle and a broad soft hair brush that when wetted should form a fine tip. Also spelled Sumi-e (墨絵, Ink wash painting).
- Hake (刷毛): An Asian style of brush with a large broad wooden handle and an extremely fine soft hair used in counterpoint to traditional Sumi brushes for covering large areas. Often made of goat hair.
- Spotter: Round brushes with just a few short bristles. These brushes are commonly used in spotting photographic prints.
- Stencil: A round brush with a flat top used on stencils to ensure the bristles don't get underneath. Also used to create texture.

=== Art sizes ===
Artists' brushes are usually given numbered sizes, although there is no exact standard for their physical dimensions. From smallest to largest, the sizes are: 20/0, 12/0, 10/0, 7/0, 6/0, 5/0, 4/0 (also written 0000), 000, 00, 0, 1, 2, 3, 4, 5, 6, 7, 8, 9, 10, 11, 12, 13, 14, 16, 18, 20, 22, 24, 25, 26, 28, 30, 2 inch, 4 inch, 6 inch, and 8 inch. Brushes as fine as 30/0 are manufactured by major companies, but are not a common size. Sizes 000 to 20 are most common.

=== Art bristles ===
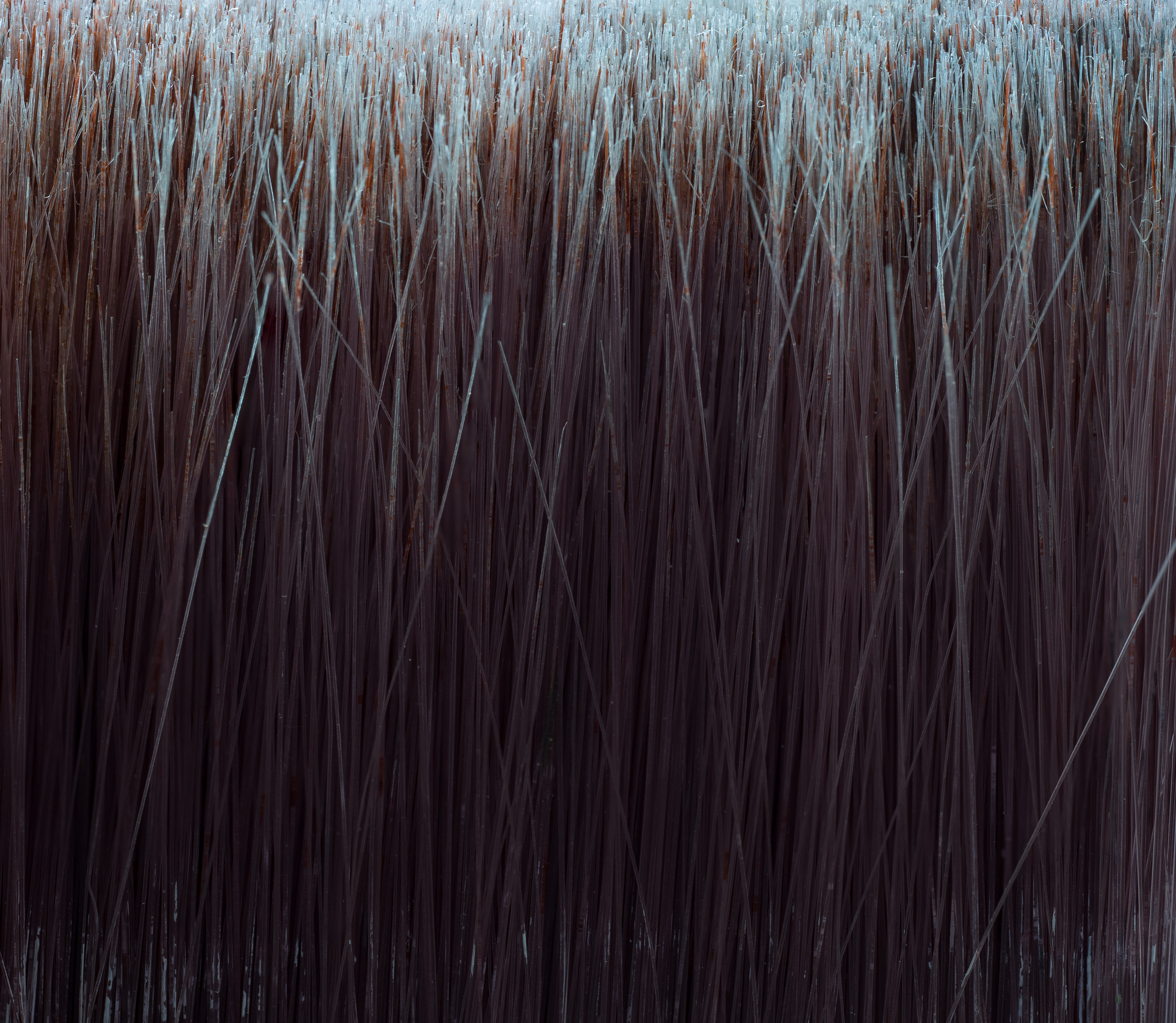
Closeup of an oil paintbrush

Bristles may be natural—either soft hair or hog bristle—or synthetic. Types include:

- watercolor brushes which are usually made of sable, synthetic sable or nylon;
- oil painting brushes which are usually made of sable or bristle;
- acrylic brushes which are almost entirely nylon or synthetic.

Turpentine or thinners used in oil painting can destroy some types of synthetic brushes. However, innovations in synthetic bristle technology have produced solvent resistant synthetic bristles suitable for use in all media. Natural hair, squirrel, badger or sable are used by watercolorists due to their superior ability to absorb and hold water.

Soft hair brushes
The best of these are made from kolinsky sable, other red sables, or miniver (Russian squirrel winter coat; tail) hair. Sabeline is ox hair dyed red to look like red sable and sometimes blended with it. Camel hair is a generic term for a cheaper and lower quality alternative, usually ox. It can be other species, or a blend of species, but never includes camel. Pony, goat, mongoose and badger hair are also used.
Hog bristle
Often called China bristle or Chungking bristle. This is stiffer and stronger than soft hair. It may be bleached or unbleached.
Synthetic bristles
These are made of special multi-diameter extruded nylon filament, Taklon or polyester. These are becoming ever more popular with the development of new water based paints.

=== Art handles ===
Artists' brush handles are commonly wooden but can also be made of molded plastic. Many mass-produced handles are made of unfinished raw wood; better quality handles are of seasoned hardwood. The wood is sealed and lacquered to give the handle a high-gloss, waterproof finish that reduces soiling and swelling. Many brush companies offer long or short brush handle sizes.

Metal ferrules may be of aluminum, nickel, copper, or nickel-plated steel. Quill ferrules are also found: these give a different "feel" to the brush, and are staple of French-style watercolour brushes.
