= Monadenia (disambiguation) =

Monadenia may refer to:

- Monadenia, a genus of snails in the family Monadeniiidae
- Monadenia, a genus of flowering plants in the family Orchidaceae; synonym of Disa
