= Winsor & Newton =

English manufacturer of art products

- Type: Private
- Industry: Art materials
- Founded: 1832; 194 years ago in London
- Founder: William Winsor and Henry Newton
- Headquarters: London, England
- Area served: Worldwide
- Products: Acrylics, oils, watercolor, gouache, brushes, canvases, papers, inks, graphite and colored pencils, markers, charcoal
- Brands: Artist's Hog, Azanta, Winton, Cotman, Monarch, Artisan, Sceptre
- Parent: Colart Group
- Website: winsornewton.com

Winsor & Newton manufactures fine art products for artists, including brushes, paints and mediums. The company was founded by William Winsor and Henry Newton, in London, in 1832. The company is a subsidiary of ColArt, which is ultimately owned by Lindéngruppen. The company has factories in locations such as the UK and France.

== History ==
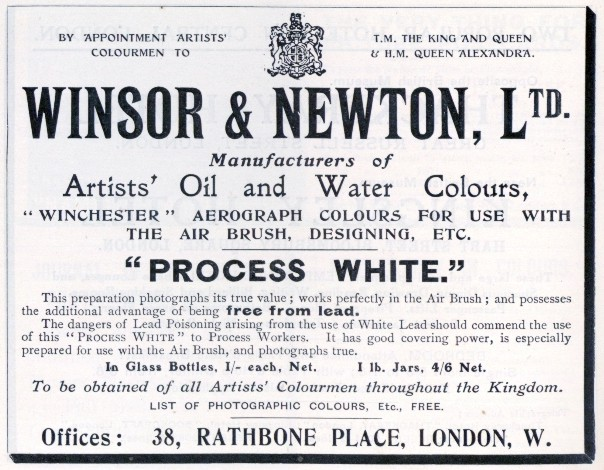
Winsor & Newton in The Photographic Journal, 1914

The company was founded in 1832 by William Winsor and Henry Newton. The firm was originally located at 38 Rathbone Place, London. Many artists and producers of art materials were based in this area, including artists like Constable.

In 1841, they were granted a Royal Warrant. Winsor & Newton's kolinsky sable brush, the Series 7, was developed for Queen Victoria in 1866.

Winsor & Newton was incorporated as a limited company in 1881, when Henry Newton sold the business, with the Winsor and Newton families remaining shareholders.

The company moved to Wealdstone in northwest London in 1937. After World War II, they opened a brush-making factory in Lowestoft, which was still making brushes as of 2024.

The company was formerly owned by conglomerate Reckitt & Colman until it was sold in the early 1990s to ColArt, a certified B corporation owned by family business Lindéngruppen.

In 2010, ColArt announced that the Winsor & Newton factory in Wealdstone would close, with the manufacturing moved to France. Although the local council tried to get the company to stay in the area, a company representative responded that "Wealdstone’s physical location in the heart of a residential area means it cannot absorb the additional capacity required".

Winsor & Newton partnered with the Paul Smith Foundation in 2024 to launch an art prize.

== Products ==
Winsor & Newton developed watercolour containing glycerine in 1835. William Winsor gained a patent for a screw cap mechanism on metal tubes that were collapsible in 1842, with the business selling watercolour in tubes subsequently to this. The company began selling craft products in 1911. In 1937, they launched Designers' Gouache. An acrylics range was produced in 1970 and six years later they created the first alkyd colour for artists.

Winsor & Newton introduced Artisan Water-Mixable oil paints, oil medium, linseed oil, stand oil, fast-drying medium, and impasto medium in 1997.

Their historic archives have been analysed to identify the organic colourants possibly contained in shades. These archives have also been discussed in terms of pigment history, canvas supports, oils and varnishes by authors Harley and Carlyle.

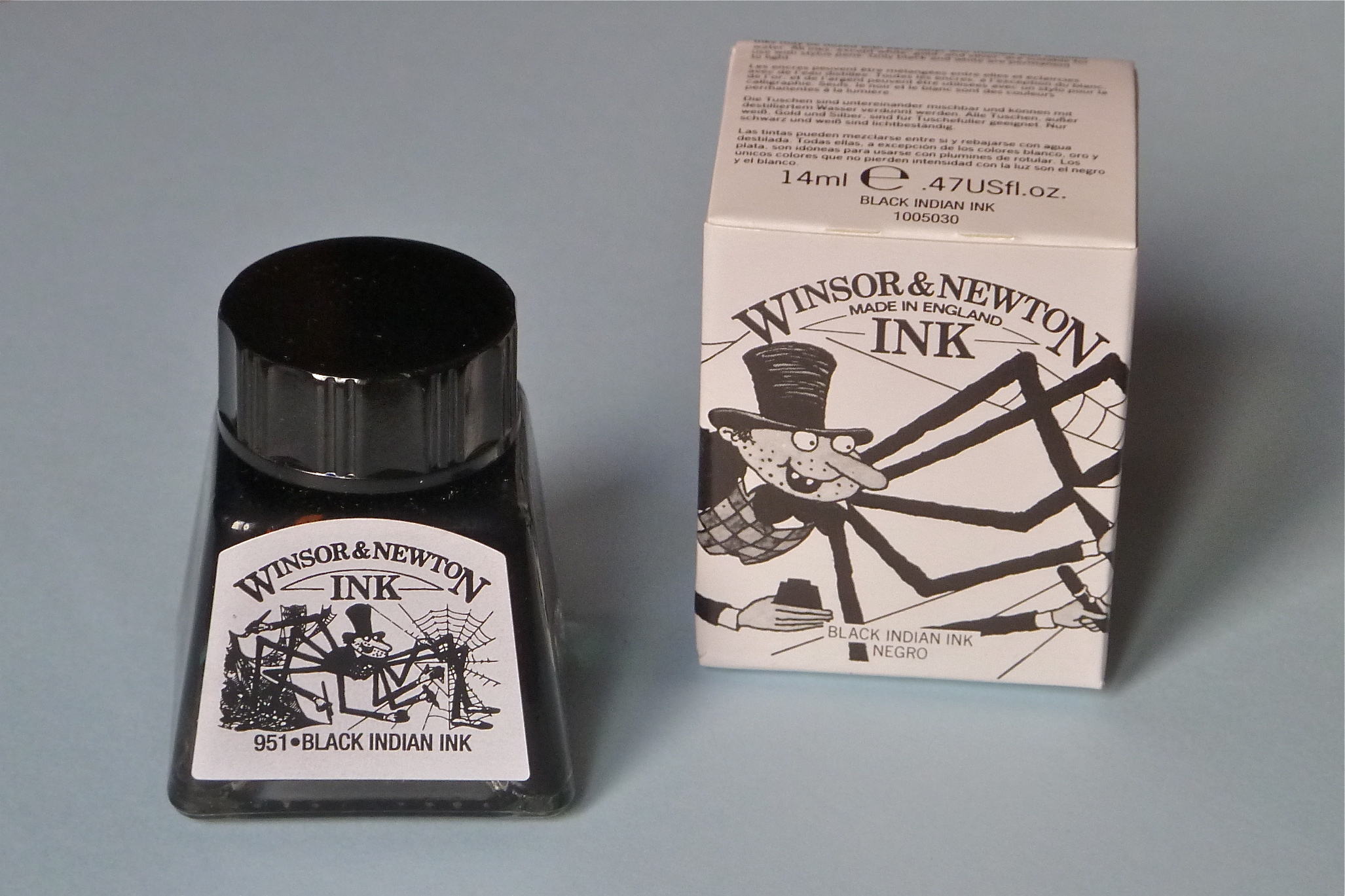
Ink bottle

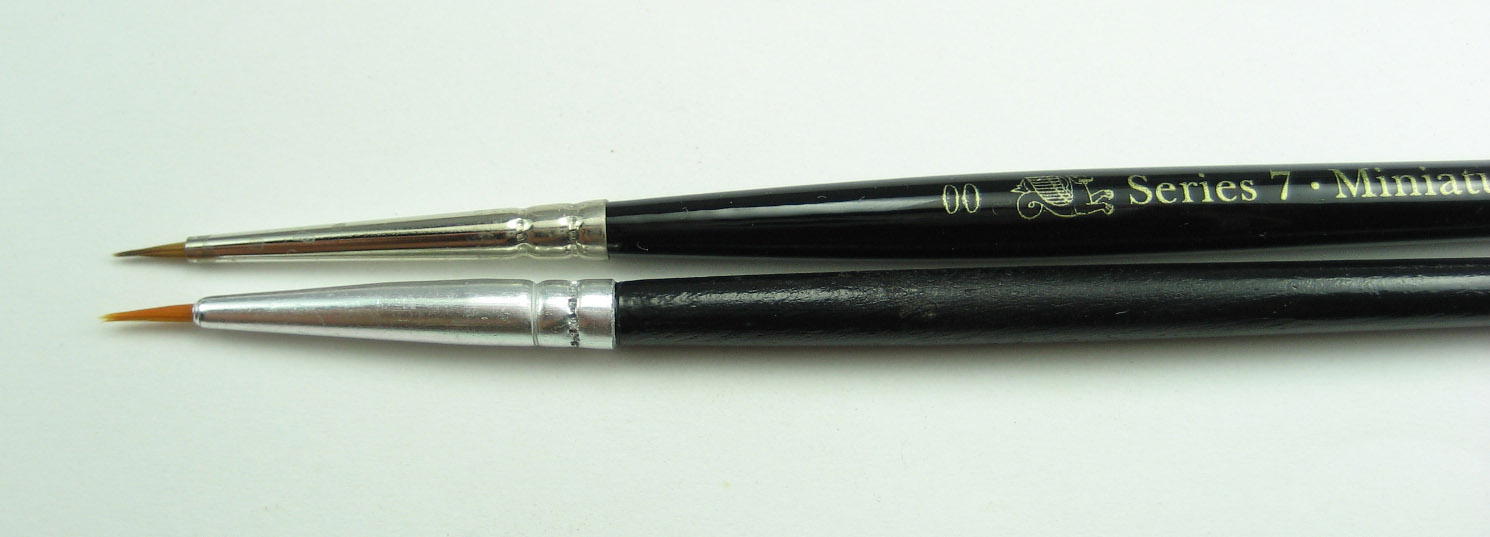
Series 7 kolinsky sable-hair brush

Product	Range / brand
Brushes	Natural hair (kolinsky sable -Series 7, squirrel, hog -Artist's Hog, Azanta, Winton), synthetic fibres (Cotman, Monarch, Artisan, Galeria), natural/synthetic mix (Sceptre)
Paints	Oil (Winton, Artist's, Griffin Artisan), acrylic (Galeria, Finity), watercolour (Cotman, Artist's), gouache (Designers), marker pens (Promarker), (Promarker Brush), (Promarker Watercolour), charcoal, graphite and coloured pencils
Inks	Drawing and calligraphy inks
Papers	Watercolour, oil (Winton), acrylic (Galeria), marker, sketching
Canvas	Cotton, polycotton
Accessories	Canvas boards, solvents, masking fluids, varnishes, easels, travel bags, brush holders, stools, instructional books
