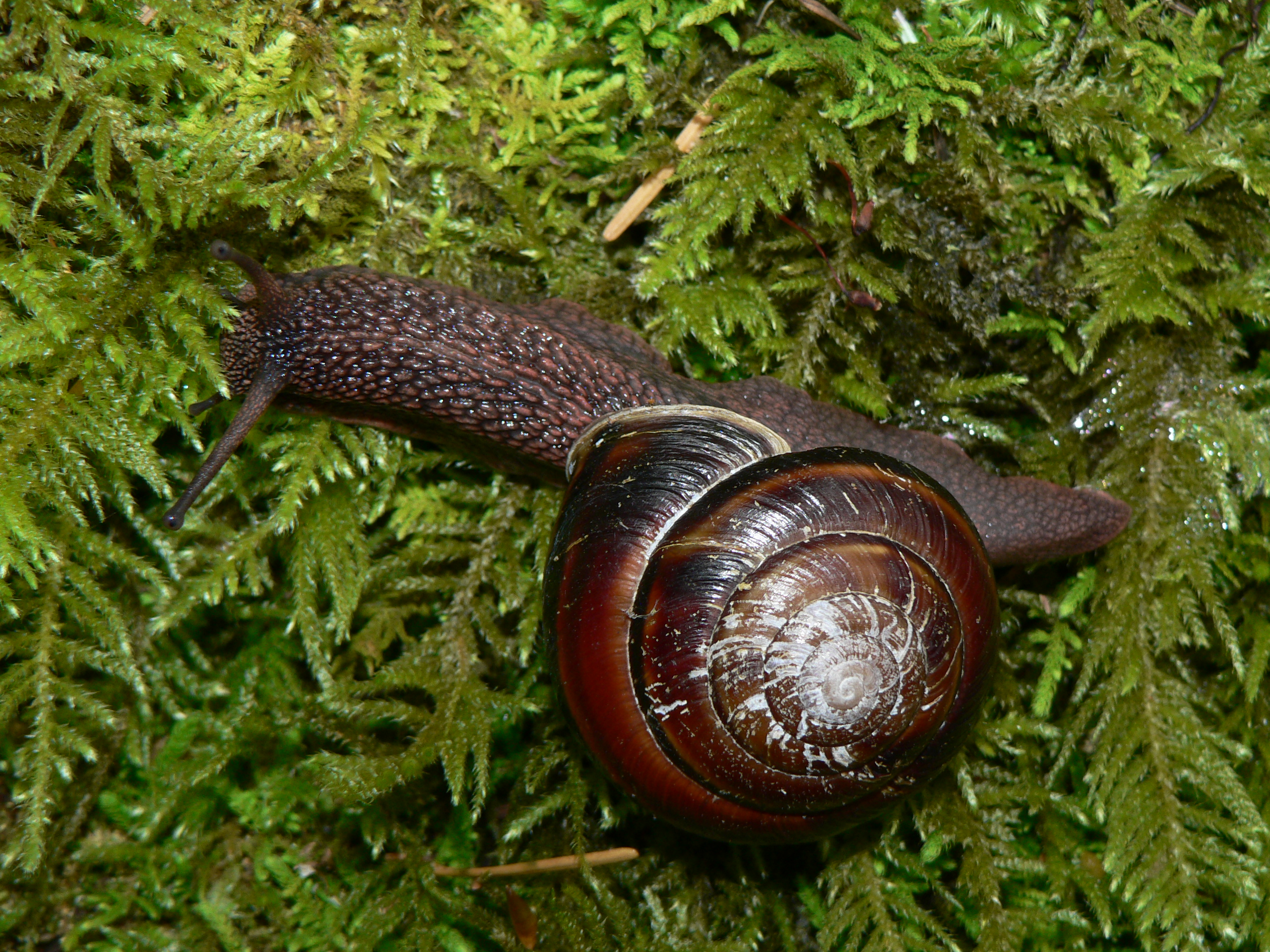

Conservation status
- Apparently Secure (NatureServe)

Scientific classification
- Kingdom: Animalia
- Phylum: Mollusca
- Class: Gastropoda
- Order: Stylommatophora
- Family: Xanthonychidae
- Genus: Monadenia
- Species: M. fidelis

Binomial name
- Monadenia fidelis (J. E. Gray, 1834)

= Monadenia fidelis =

Species of gastropod

Monadenia fidelis, commonly known as the Pacific sideband, is a medium-sized species of air-breathing land snail. M. fidelis is a terrestrial pulmonate gastropod mollusk in the family Monadeniidae.

These snails display a great deal of morphological variation: the shell of the Pacific sideband typically has a chestnut brown base, with bands of yellow, dark brown, and red. The body of the animal is rosy or purplish brown, with gray or black throughout. This species of snail reproduces using love darts. At 22 to 36 mm wide, it is the largest land snail species in the state of Washington.

== Distribution ==
M. fidelis is endemic to the Pacific Coast of North America, and is found in California, Oregon, Washington, British Columbia, and Alaska. There is a significant amount of morphological variation among individuals of this species, and several distinct subspecies are recognized. While populations of this snail display distinct morphotypes, recent research in genomics indicates that there is gene flow between recognized subspecies, and even between M. fidelis and other species in the genus Monadenia.

M. fidelis is commonly found in low elevation wet coastal forests, but is found in non-forested and urban areas as well. It is most common in deciduous and mixed forests, but can occasionally be found in coniferous forests.
