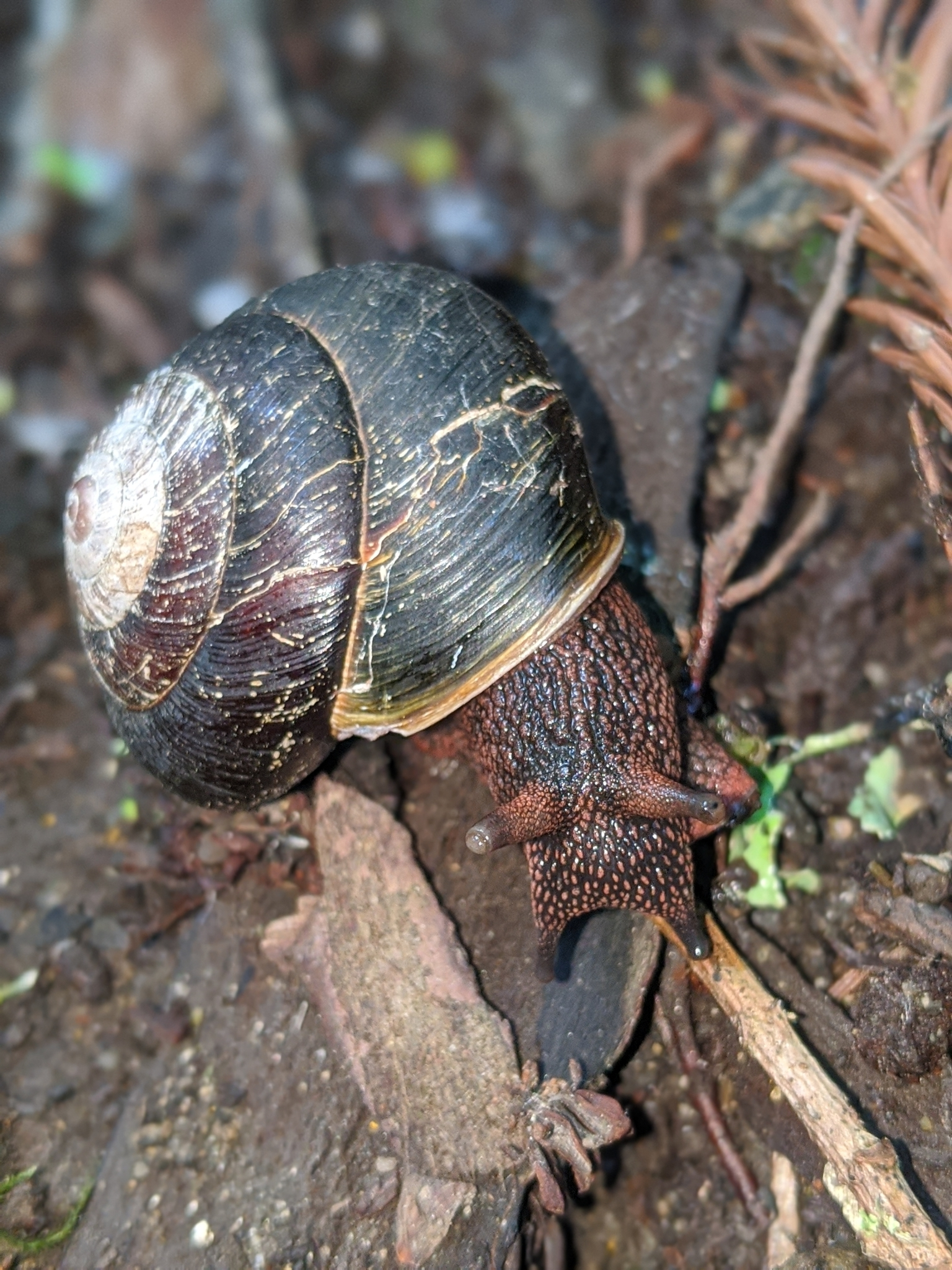

Conservation status
- Imperiled (NatureServe)

Scientific classification
- Kingdom: Animalia
- Phylum: Mollusca
- Class: Gastropoda
- Order: Stylommatophora
- Family: Xanthonychidae
- Genus: Monadenia
- Species: M. infumata

Binomial name
- Monadenia infumata (A. Gould, 1855)

Synonyms
- Epiphragmophora infumata (A. Gould, 1855) (unaccepted combination); Helix infumata A. Gould, 1855

= Monadenia infumata =

Species of land snails

Monadenia infumata, the redwood sideband snail, is a species of land snail found on the Pacific coast of the United States.

Subspecies

- Monadenia infumata callidina S.S. Berry, 1940
- Monadenia infumata infumata (A. Gould, 1855)
- Monadenia infumata trinidadensis Talmadge, 1947
- Monadenia infumata alamedensis S. S. Berry, 1940: synonym of Monadenia infumata infumata (A. Gould, 1855)
- Monadenia infumata ochromphalus S.S. Berry, 1937: synonym of Monadenia ochromphalus S. S. Berry, 1937
- Monadenia infumata setosa Talmadge, 1952: synonym of Monadenia setosa Talmadge, 1952
- Monadenia infumata subcarinata (Hemphill in W.G. Binney, 1892): synonym of Monadenia subcarinata (Hemphill in W.G. Binney, 1892)
