= International Art Materials Trade Association =

International Art Materials Association
- Founded: 1950
- Tax ID no.: 11-6015643
- Purpose: "NAMTA's mission is to provide its art/creative materials industry members with the products, services and information needed to grow and prosper."
- Location: Huntersville, North Carolina
- Region served: global
- Products: conferences and trade shows; Essential Reference Guide; Art Materials Professional Certificate Program
- Services: support, training, and marketing resources
- Method: international conventions and trade shows; professional development and employee training resources
- Members: 1,200 (approximately)
- Key people: Leah Siffringer, Executive Director
- Revenue: $915,415 (As of 2011)
- Employees: six
- Website: namta.org
- Formerly called: National Art Materials Trade Association

The International Art Materials Trade Association (NAMTA), also known as the National Art Materials Trade Association, is an international nonprofit corporation based out of Huntersville, North Carolina. It is the largest organization in the world that works exclusively on behalf of the craft and fine art art materials industry. The association works collaboratively to provide executive, management, sales, marketing, and merchandising support; staff training and certification at all levels of employment, and public relations and marketing resources for industry professionals. The association includes Retailers, Suppliers, Manufacturers, Distributors, and Creative Professionals located in 39 countries around the world.

== Corporate history ==
The National Art Materials Trade Association was established on January 4, 1950, in Chicago, Illinois. Edward Ellison, editor of the Art Material Trade News, saw the need for a unified art materials industry and incorporated NAMTA as a nonprofit trade association, scheduling its first meeting of the board of directors the next month. During governance discussions, Frank Peters of Favor, Ruhl & Co. was elected the first president and Ellison was elected secretary/treasurer. There were 17 members when the organization started. In addition to Ellison and Peters, founding members include Henry Levinson, founder of Liquitex.

The goal of the founders was to create an official trade association that would work together with organizations and individuals to identify areas for business development and improvement, ensuring the perpetual existence of the industry, while working jointly to achieve and maintain a high level of professionalism and profitability.

As of 2012, NAMTA represents members in the art and creative material industry in 39 countries around the world. In 2011, the Board of Directors changed the name of the organization from the National Art Materials Trade Association, to the International Art Materials Trade Association, in order to better reflect the scope of its membership. The association chose to retain the use of NAMTA as its official acronym.

In November 2021, AFCI (The Association for Creative Industries) merged with Namta. Expanding the Namta membership to include craft materials, in addition to fine art materials.

== Products and services ==
The association provides a variety of products and services, including access to conferences and trade shows, along with a certification program. The association conducts research and studies about the industry, and new and emerging products. Additional topics include training support and professional development; legislative advocacy and regulatory mandates; information on sales and marketing trends; and news about the art materials industry on a global scale.

=== Resources ===
NAMTA provides resources for its members.

== Industry conferences and trade shows ==
Since its inception, the association has presented an annual convention, which is an international gathering of retailers, suppliers, manufacturers and creative professionals. The event provides members and associates the opportunity to access new and emerging art products, professional development training, and marketing tools and techniques. The conference also invites speakers and workshop leaders from around the world, along with approximately 150 exhibitors each year. Formerly, Art Materials World the annual convention is now called Creativation By Namta.

Art Advocacy www.namtaartadvocacy.org

== Published works ==
Books

- Papers and Boards (Sales Training Manual, Issue 4), Hasbrouck Heights, N.J.: National Art Materials Trade Association, 32 pages, 1960.
- Directory of Art and Craft Materials, 1966, Volume 16, Issue 12 of Art material trade news, Chicago: National Art Materials Trade Association, 224 pages, 1965.
- Drawing for Reproduction (Sales Training Manual, Issue 13), Hasbrouck Heights, N.J.: National Art Materials Trade Association, 24 pages, 1968.
- Folb, Jay. Start, Hasbrouck Heights, N.J.: National Art Materials Trade Association, 1969.
- NAMTA: The First 25 Years, Hasbrouck Heights, N.J.: National Art Materials Trade Association, 71 pages, 1975.
- Picture Framing (Training Manual, Issue 11), Hasbrouck Heights, N.J.: National Art Materials Trade Association, 22 pages 1977.
- Brushes (Sales Training Manual, Issue 5), Hasbrouck Heights, N.J.: National Art Materials Trade Association, 16 pages, 1986.

Journals

- National Art Materials Trade Association. "Art Material Trade News". Atlanta, Georgia: Communication Channels, Inc. ISSN 0004-3265. OCLC 1514295.
- National Art Materials Trade Association. "Who's Who in Art Materials: Membership Directory". Clifton, N.J.: National Art Materials Trade Association. OCLC 11984824.
- National Art Materials Trade Association. "Directory of Art & Craft Materials". New York: Syndicate Magazines. OCLC 213514230.
- NFO Research, Inc.; National Art Materials Trade Association. "National Artist Survey". Cincinnati, Ohio: F & W Publications. ISSN 1043-9900. OCLC 19580043.
- Koh-I-Noor Rapidograph, Inc.; Mark Clements Research, Inc.; National Art Materials Trade Association. "Annual Art Supply Store Survey". Atlanta, Georgia: Art Material Trade News. OCLC 16641165.
