= Z-pinning =

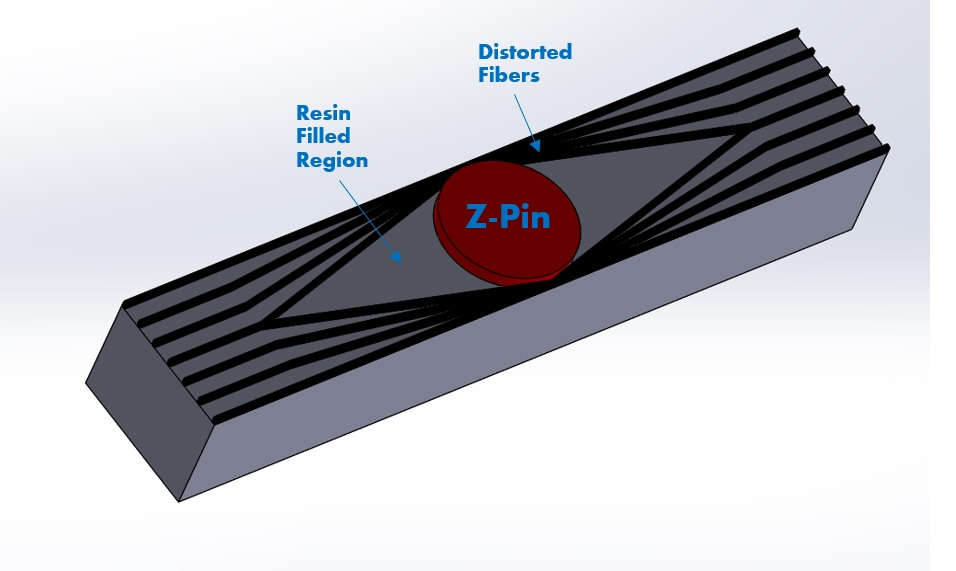
Z-pin inserted between the fibres of a composite

Z-pinning is a technique to insert reinforcing fibres (also called Z-pins or Z-fibres) along the Z-direction of continuous fibre-reinforced plastics. Z-pins can be made of metal or precured unidirectional composite fibres. It is designed for use within pre-preg technology; there is extensive experimental evidence that Z-pinning dramatically improves the resistance of the composite structure to delamination. The figure on the right shows a Z-pin inserted in between the fibres of the material. The pin spreads the fibres and creates an oval shaped gap that is filled with resin. The Z-pin prevents the composite from delamination. When a load is applied the cracks will typically form along the line of the opening.

== Benefits ==
Z-pinning is a versatile technique that can be applied to many materials that will benefit from added strength and durability. They are especially effective when used in materials that are subject to delamination, because the Z-pins can counteract this problem. Z-pinning has been used in aircraft manufacturing to add strength. By Z-pinning the materials on an aircraft, such as the wings, it can have a much higher resistance to damage during flight. Also, if the aircraft does suffer from a minor crack, the Z-pinning will prevent it from catastrophic failure. Z-pins can also be used for automotive applications. The pins can be inserted into carbon fibre parts to increase the strength of them. If the front splitter of a car was constructed with Z-pins, it would be able to withstand significantly more impacts because the Z-pins would hold it together even with a minor crack. This allows the carbon fibre parts to remain light while still being strong. Testing of different size Z-pins has indicated that larger pins lead to an increase in strength. A 1% increase in the size of the Z-pin increases toughness by up to 6 to 25 times. However, too large of a pin can disrupts the fibres of the material more leading to it fracturing.

== Z-Pin production ==
There are many methods of creating Z-pins. Typically, Z-pins are pre-cured and then inserted into composites. One process consists of pulling a continuous-fibre tow through a bath of liquid resin using a pultrusion machine. The fibre is then pulled out of the bath through the die which creates the shape and size of the pin. The pin is next sandwiched in a vertical orientation in foam to finish the process. The pin may be coated or treated as an additional step depending on the application. This process is one of the more efficient and cost effective ways of producing Z-pins because it can be easily adapted to different pin sizes.

== Manufacturing with Z-Pins ==
Z-pins have many ways of being inserted into the material of choice. The most common method is a process using an ultrasonic hammer. The hammer compresses the foam that encases the pins and pushes the pins into the material. The hammer induces high frequency vibrations to the pin as it compresses. The vibrating chamfered tip of the Z-pins locally heats up and softens the resin allowing the Z-fibre to penetrate the preform with minimal disruption of the long fibres. The remaining pin and laminate above the surface are removed to create a smooth and even surface The surface can be finished with a coating to seal the Z-pins inside the material. A hand-held ultrasonic gun can also be used to insert Z-pins on a small scale production. This is ideal for testing materials containing Z-pins because they can be easily inserted into any location on the material.

== See also ==
- Tufting (composites)
