= Filbert paintbrush =

Tip of a filbert brush

The filbert paintbrush is a paintbrush used in artwork. It has a thick ferrule and hairs that are, on average, medium to long hairs in the shape of an oval. Filberts are particularly effective in blending work, usually of a figurative nature. Many artists agree that natural fibers work best for filberts, because the hairs stick together better when wet.

Hairs that can be used are sable, mongoose, bristle, badger and synthetic.

== History ==
The filbert paintbrush derives its name from the shape it resembles: a hazelnut (filbert nut). The nut is named after Philibert, a 7th-century Frankish abbot and a saint whose feast day coincides with the ripening of the nut in August.

== Use ==
The Filbert paintbrush also makes a thicker stoke. Artists can use this to make thicker lines on a painting.
