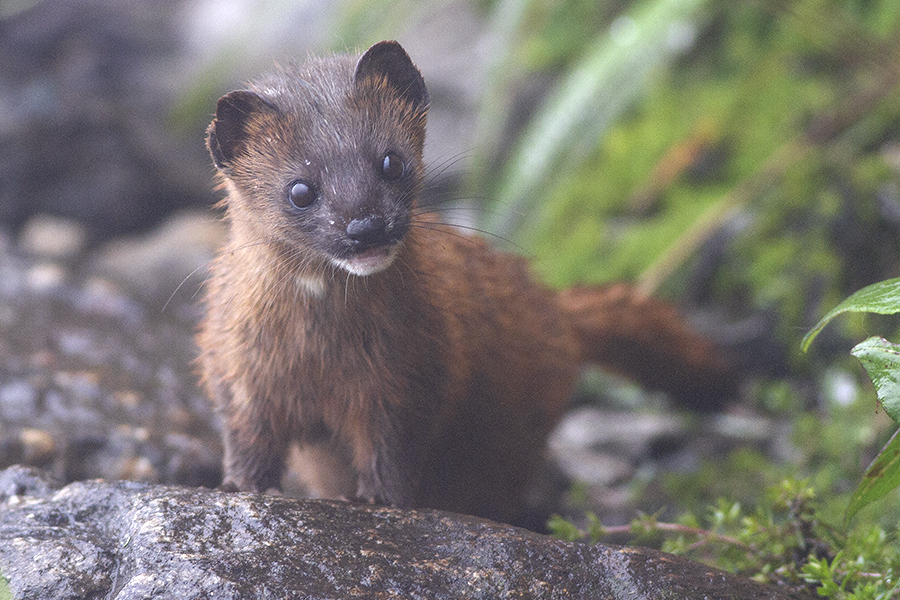
- In Pangolakha Wildlife Sanctuary

Conservation status
- Least Concern (IUCN 3.1)
- CITES Appendix III

Scientific classification
- Kingdom: Animalia
- Phylum: Chordata
- Class: Mammalia
- Infraclass: Placentalia
- Order: Carnivora
- Family: Mustelidae
- Genus: Mustela
- Species: M. sibirica

Binomial name
- Mustela sibirica Pallas, 1773
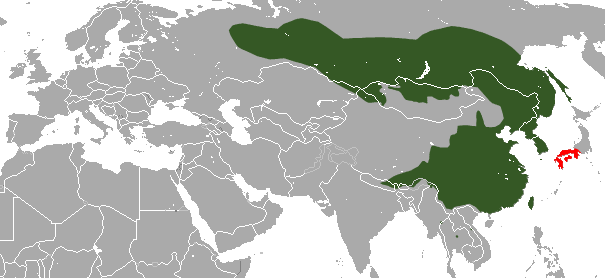
- Siberian weasel range (green – native, red – introduced)

= Siberian weasel =

Species of carnivore

The Siberian weasel or kolonok (Mustela sibirica) is a medium-sized weasel native to Asia, where it is widely distributed and inhabits various forest habitats and open areas. It is therefore listed as least concern on the IUCN Red List.

== Description ==
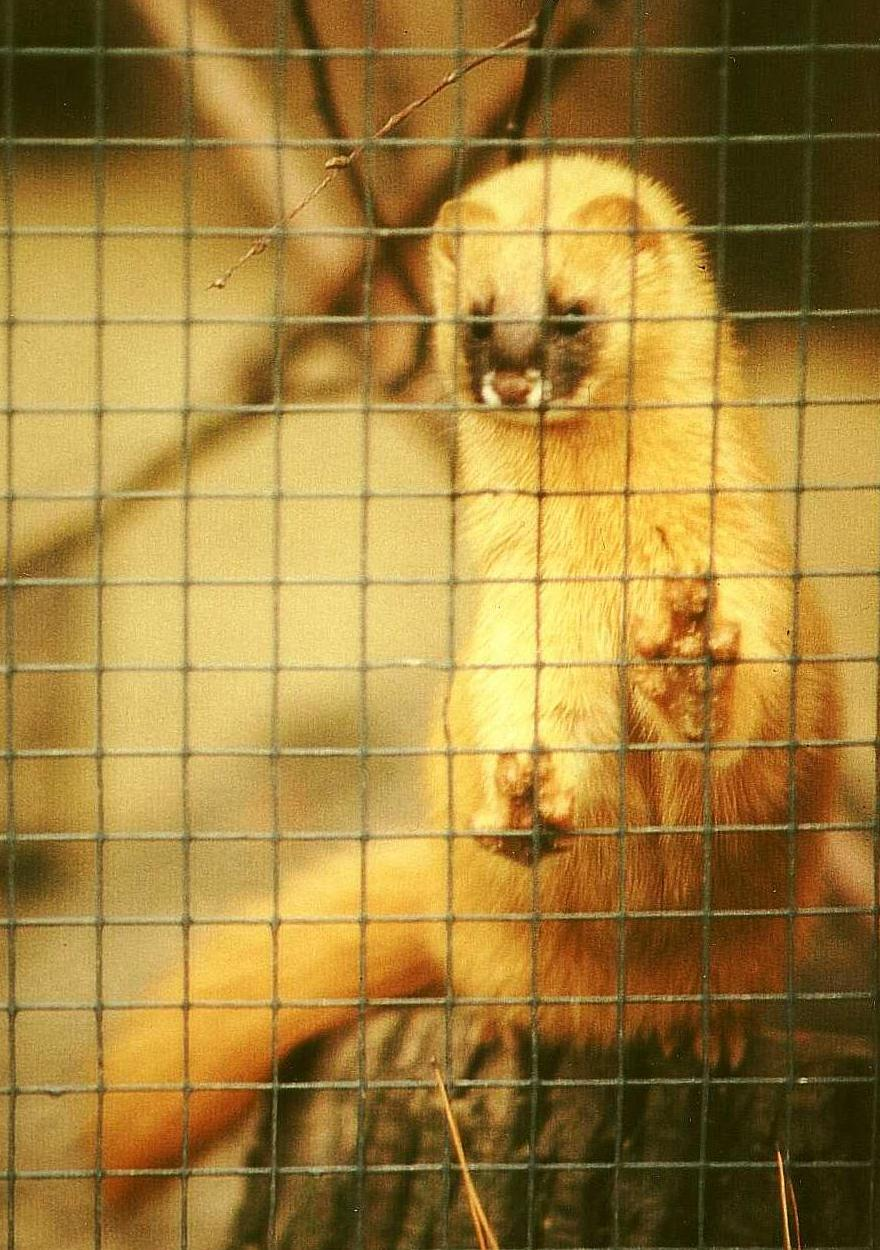
Mustela sibirica in winter coat

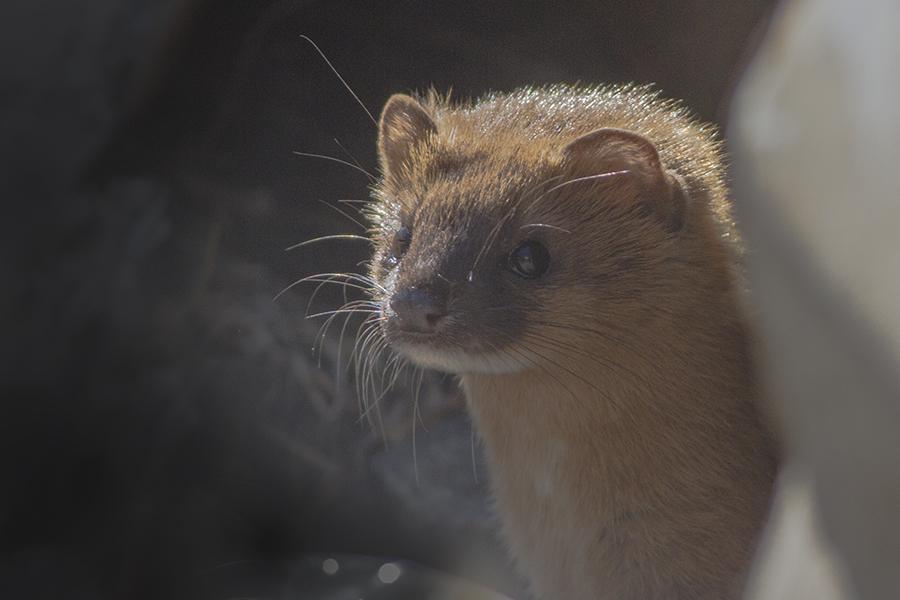
Siberian weasel in winter coat at Pangolakha Wildlife Sanctuary

The Siberian weasel has a long, stretched out body with relatively short legs. Its head is elongated, narrow and relatively small, and its short ears are broad at the base. Its tail is half the length of its body. Its winter fur is very dense, soft and fluffy, with guard hairs reaching 3–4 cm (1.2–1.6 in) in length. The underfur is dense and loose fitting. Siberian weasels are monotone in colour, being bright reddish-ocherous or straw-red, though orange or peach tones are sometimes noticeable on the skin. These tones are especially bright on the back, while the flanks and underbelly are paler. A dark, coffee-brown mask is present on the face. Their tails are more brightly coloured than the back, and are fluffier than those of other members of the genus. The lips and chin are white or slightly ochreous. The front of the muzzle is darker than the remaining parts of the head. Its skull is in several respects intermediate in form between that of the stoat and the mink; it is longer and larger than that of the stoat, but is somewhat more flattened than the mink's. Adult males are 28–39 cm (11–15 in) long, while females reach 25–30.5 cm (9.8–12.0 in). The tail in males reaches 15.5–21 cm (6.1–8.3 in) in length, while that of females reaches 13.3–16.4 cm (5.2–6.5 in). Males weigh 650–820 g (23–29 oz), while females weigh 360–430 g (13–15 oz). Exceptionally large individuals were sighted in the Baraba steppe.

== Behaviour and ecology ==
=== Burrows ===
The Siberian weasel builds its nest inside fallen logs, empty stumps, brushwood piles and exposed tree roots. It also uses and enlarges the dens of other species. The length of its burrows ranges from 0.6–4.2 m (2 ft 0 in – 13 ft 9 in) and 0.2–1.3 m (7.9 in – 4 ft 3.2 in) deep. Adults have a permanent burrow and up to five temporary shelters, which may be separated from each other by several kilometres. They build a nesting chamber in the middle or end of the burrow and line it with bird feathers and rodent hair.

=== Diet ===
In terms of prey selection, Siberian weasels are midway between small, rodent-eating mustelids such as polecats and the more polyphagous martens. They rarely eat reptiles, invertebrates and plants, preferring instead to prey on rodents of small to moderate size. Water voles are their most frequent prey in their western range, while voles and mice are eaten in their eastern range. Moderate sized rodents targeted by Siberian weasels in the east include Daurian and Alpine pikas, and Siberian zokors. In local areas, chipmunks, muskrats, red squirrels and jerboas are eaten. Fish may be eaten in some areas during certain seasons. In Ussuriland, they scavenge extensively on the kills of wolves and yellow-throated martens during the winter. Elsewhere, small birds are an important food item. Reptiles and amphibians are typically eaten at the periphery of the Siberian weasel's range. Plant foods known to be eaten by Siberian weasels include pine nuts and Actinidia fruits. They typically eat about 100–120 grams (3.5–4.2 oz) of food daily, and cache excess food. In urban areas in China, Siberian weasels prey extensively on rats. They are capable of killing and dragging the largest fowls. Siberian weasels are active hunters and chase prey through snow, logs, water and people's houses.

=== Reproduction ===
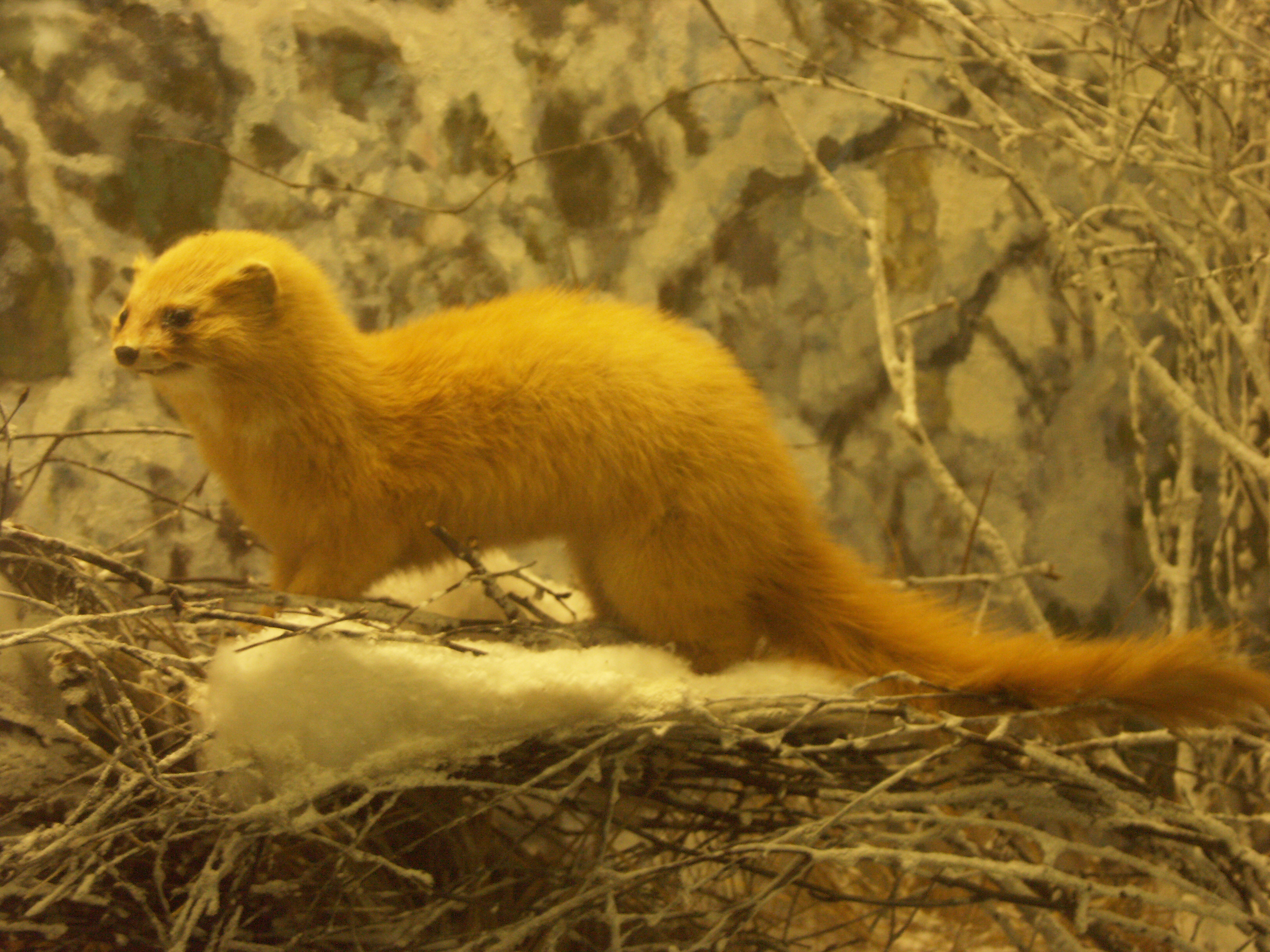
Exhibit at the Zoological Museum of the Zoological Institute of the Russian Academy of Sciences

The rutting period of the Siberian weasel varies depending on location. In western Siberia, it begins in early February to late March. In Primorye, it begins in early March to late April. Six pairs of Siberian weasels in a fur sovkhoz near Moscow were in rut between 25 April and 15 May. They repeatedly mate during 35 minutes. The gestation period lasts 38–41 days. There is one record of a female giving birth after only 28 days. Litters consist of 4–10 kits. They are born blind and are sparsely furred with white hair. They develop light yellow hair after a few days, and open their eyes after a month. They suckle for two months, and become independent by late August. By this time, the young have almost reached adult size, but still have their deciduous teeth and lighter bones. Their fur is darker than that of adults.

== Subspecies ==
As of 2005, 11 subspecies are recognised.

Subspecies	Trinomial authority	Description	Range	Synonyms
Siberian kolonok Mustela sibirica sibirica	Pallas, 1773	A small subspecies with light, yellowish-red fur. Skull length in males is 5.8–6.3 cm, while in females it is 4.9–5.6 cm.	All of Siberia eastward to the Zeya River basin, the contiguous parts of Mongolia and possibly the extreme western parts of northeastern China	australis (Satunin, 1911) miles (Barrett-Hamilton, 1904)
Tibetan kolonok Mustela sibirica canigula	Hodgson, 1842	Distinguished from other subspecies by having a much greater amount of white fur around the muzzle, neck and almost to the forelimbs. It has an exceptionally thick coat and bushy tail. The body is bright foxy-red, and lacks a black tail-tip.	Tibet	
Manchurian kolonok Mustela sibirica charbinensis	Lowkashkin, 1935		Manchuria	
Korean kolonok Mustela sibirica coreanus	Domaniewski, 1926		The Korean Peninsula	peninsulae (Kishida, 1931)
Taiwanese kolonok Mustela sibirica davidiana	Milne-Edward's, 1871	Has a more intense colouration than fontanierii, being almost ochreous orange in fresh winter pelage	Southeastern China north to Hubei and Taiwan	melli (Matschie, 1922) noctis (Barrett-Hamilton, 1904) taivana (Thomas, 1913)
North Chinese kolonok Mustela sibirica fontanierii	Milne-Edwards, 1871	Has a uniform pale fulvous coat with a pale brown forehead and muzzle, with varying degrees of white in the center of the throat and neck	Northern China, including Beijing, Hebei, Shandong, Shaanxi and Shanxi	stegmanni (Matschie, 1907)
Hodgson's kolonok Mustela sibirica hodgsoni	Gray, 1843	Distinguished from canigula by the smaller amount of white on the muzzle, the head's darker hue and the white area of the throat being limited to white patches rather than forming a continuous line. It is similar in size to subhemachalana and moupinensis, though its skull is smaller than the latter's.	Kashmir and the western Himalayas from Kam to Garwal	
Far Eastern kolonok Mustela sibirica manchurica	Brass, 1911	A somewhat larger subspecies than sibirica, with a lighter red coloured coat. Skull length in males is 6.3–6.7 cm, while in females it is 5.7–6.2 cm.	Priamurye to the west of the Zeya, the Primorye and northeastern China	
Burmese kolonok Mustela sibirica moupinensis	Milne-Edwards, 1974	Closely resembles subhemachalana in having a black tail tip, but distinguished by its larger skull and greater incidence of white fur on the muzzle	Sichuan, Gansu, and Yunnan, China and Burma	hamptoni (Thomas, 1921) major (Hilzheimer, 1910) tafeli (Hilzheimer, 1910)
Quelpart kolonok Mustela sibirica quelpartis	Thomas, 1908		Jeju Island, South Korea	
Himalayan kolonok Mustela sibirica subhemachalana	Hodgson, 1837	Smaller than sibirica and has a blackish tail tip. It lacks the typical white patch on the sides of the muzzle, which is blackish, save for narrow white lines on the edge of the upper lip and a white chin. The general colour ranges from bright foxy-red to dark chocolate brown.	The Himalayas from Nepal to Bhutan	horsfieldii (Gray, 1843) humeralis (Blyth, 1842)

== Distribution and habitat ==
The Siberian weasels ranges from the Himalayas in Pakistan, India, Nepal and Bhutan to northern Myanmar, northern Thailand, Laos, Taiwan, China, and Korea. In Russia, it occurs in the Kirov Province, Tataria, from the western Urals through Siberia to the Russian Far East. It has been introduced to Honshu, Shikoku and Kyushu islands.

== Fossil record ==
Fossils of the Siberian weasel are known from Denisova Cave.

== Cultural significance ==
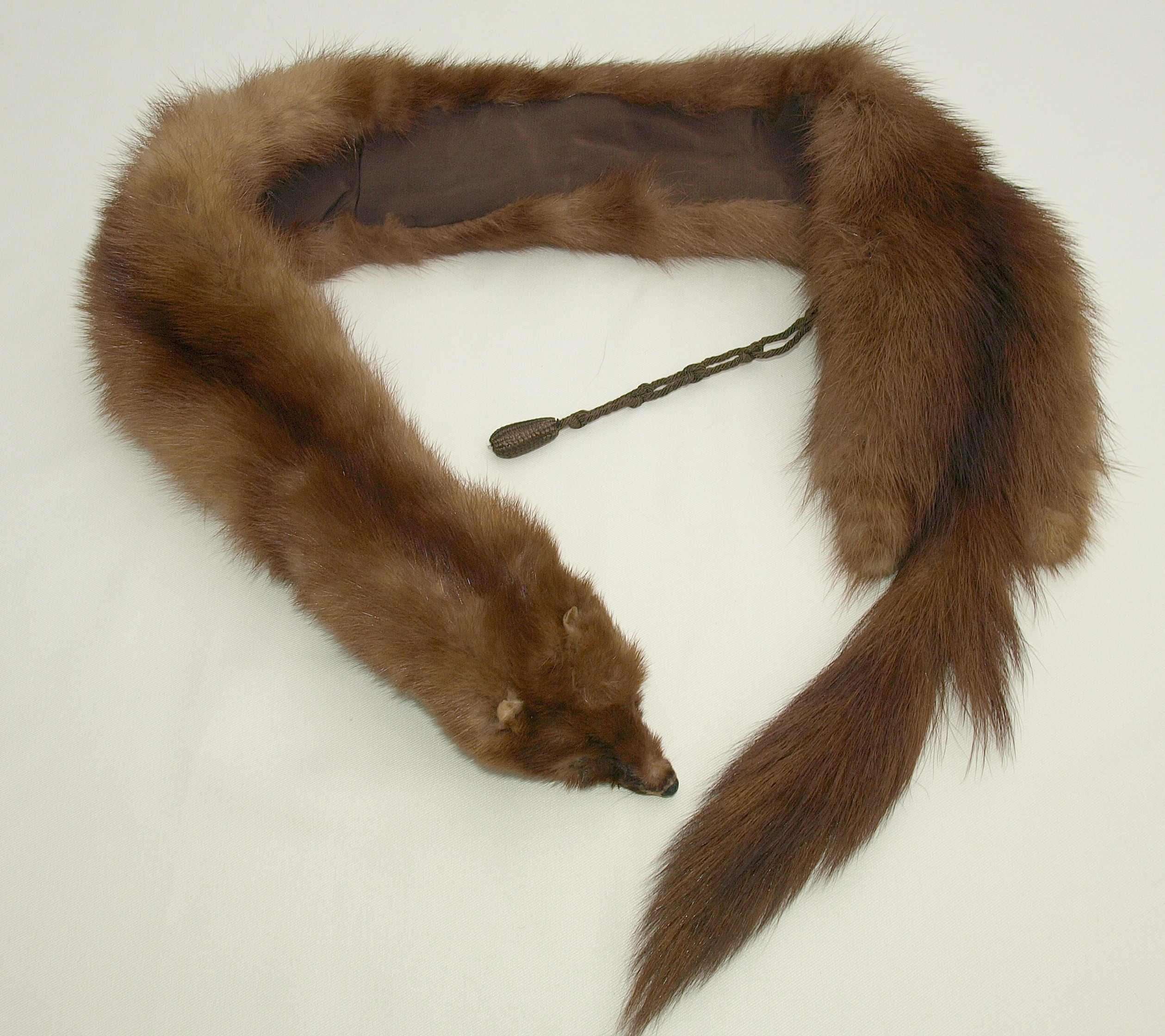
Kolinski fur choker

In Chinese folklore, the Siberian weasel is viewed as a wandering spirit (shen) that can steal and replace people's souls.

Although Siberian weasels are overall useful for limiting rodent populations, they are nonetheless damaging to poultry and muskrat farms. They frequently enter the roosts of domesticated fowl and pigeons, sometimes killing more than they can eat.

Siberian weasels are valuable furbearers, being significantly harvested in Siberia and the Far East. Their fur is used both in its natural state and for imitating the fur of more valuable species. A couple of alternative names for the fur were Tartar sable and fire marten. Siberian weasel fur is also used to make the so-called kolinsky sable-hair brush. In China, their orange fur is largely used to create ink brushes for calligraphers. The name of the brush is thus 狼毫筆, lit. 'wolf hairs brush', as a reduction from 黃鼠狼 + 毫 + 筆, lit. "yellow rat wolf" "hairs" "brush". Their hairs are appreciated because they are harder than goat hair (羊毫). They are hunted by shooting with dogs or through the use of box traps. They are extremely aggressive when caught in traps, emitting piercing shrieks and letting loose a pungent secretion which reportedly takes days to wash away.
