= Liquitex =

American acrylic paint manufacturer

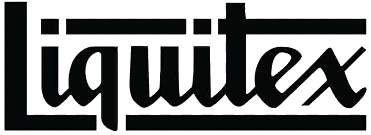
- Formerly: Permanent Pigments Company
- Company type: Private
- Industry: Art materials
- Founded: 1955; 71 years ago
- Founder: Henry Levison
- Headquarters: Cincinnati, Ohio, United States
- Area served: Worldwide
- Products: Acrylic paints
- Parent: Colart
- Website: liquitex.com

Liquitex is a US company that supplies art materials, focusing exclusively on the development, manufacture and distribution of acrylic paints. Founded by Henry Levison as "Permanent Pigments" in 1955, the company created the first water-based acrylic gesso. That same year, Levison decided to reorganize the company under the name "Liquitex". In 1956, the company starting selling water-based "Soft Body" acrylic paints. In 1963, "Heavy Body" paints were available with a thicker consistency. The company offers the largest number of acrylic paint products in the world.

== History ==
Liquitex was developed by the Permanent Pigments Company, established in 1933 by Henry Levison. Permanent Pigments was a small, family-owned business located in Cincinnati that focused on developing oil paint.

In 1950, Henry Levison, along with other professionals in the art materials industry, established the National Art Materials Trade Association, now known as the International Art Materials Trade Association. It was the first trade organization in the world that focused on promoting and sustaining the manufacture, distribution, sales, and training in the use of art materials.

In 1955, Levison developed a quick-drying, water-emulsified acrylic polymer resin. In selecting a name for the new product, Levison chose "Liquitex" as a portmanteau of "liquid" and "texture". The name was based on the character of the medium, which was a liquid base, quick drying and easily used to create texture in artwork.

In 1964, Binney & Smith acquired the Liquitex brand, eventually selling it in 2000 to its present owner, Colart.

Liquitex's first cadmium-free pigments debuted in 2017, in response to growing environmental and health concerns regarding the heavy metals found in oil, acrylic, and watercolor paints.

== Products ==
Product	Options
Paints	Liquitex Professional Paint Markers; Liquitex Professional Spray Paint; Liquitex Professional Soft Body Acrylic Paint; Liquitex Professional Heavy Body Acrylic Paint; Liquitex Professional Acrylic Ink! Liquitex Basics; Liquitex Basics Matt
Mediums	Gesso; Fluid mediums Gel mediums Effects mediums Additive mediums Removable and non-removable varnishes
Brushes	Professional brushes Professional knives Basics brushes

== Notable adopters of acrylics ==
Helen Frankenthaler and Andy Warhol were early adopters of Liquitex acrylic paints. David Hockney switched from oils to acrylics after Liquitex made a less liquid medium in 1963 (High Viscosity Artist Color).

Liquitex is used by mural artists like Thomas Hart Benton. Abstract expressionist artist Robert Motherwell switched to acrylic paints due to his use of large amounts of black, a color that (as oil paint) takes an especially long time to dry. He continued to use oil paint for some work, but mostly used acrylics after the mid-1960s.
