= Trinity bristle snail =

Monadenia setosa

Conservation status
- Vulnerable (IUCN 2.3)

Scientific classification
- Kingdom: Animalia
- Phylum: Mollusca
- Class: Gastropoda
- Order: Stylommatophora
- Family: Xanthonychidae
- Genus: Monadenia
- Species: M. setosa

Binomial name
- Monadenia setosa (Talmadge, 1952)

Synonyms
- Monadenia infumata setosa

Species of gastropod

The Trinity bristle snail (Monadenia setosa) is a species of medium-sized land snail, a terrestrial pulmonate gastropod mollusc in the family Monadeniidae.

== Description ==
The Trinity bristle snail attains a body length of approximately 2.5 cm. It is brown or chestnut-colored and covered with minuscule, translucent bristles, which give the species its common name.

== Distribution and habitat ==
This species is endemic to California. This snail is found in northwestern Trinity County, along the Trinity River, up some of its tributaries and into the Corral Bottom area. It has a healthy population within its territory. It likes cool, wet, shady riparian zones, and prefers areas with a deciduous understory.

== Ecology ==
The Trinity bristle snail is dependent on cool, moist conditions, and therefore it is only active at night. It spends warmer parts of the day stuck to shady areas on tree trunks, and in especially warm parts of the summer it may not move for days. When conditions are cool enough it feeds on lichen and the tender parts of green plants. The snail has a lifespan of over ten years, and may not reach full size for nearly that long. It is subject to predation by beetles and possibly rodents.

== Survival threats ==
The species appears dependent on riparian habitats, and especially likes bigleaf maples (Acer macrophyllum), eating the leaves that are decomposing at the base of the trees (from observations during field work by Forest Service employee Gay Berrien who was involved with locating the snails during initial research in 1980). There have been no studies that show it ever occupied a larger area than it does now—much of the northwestern portion of Trinity County. At the edges of its territory it has been known to cross with others of the Monadenia genus {"Trinity Bristle Snail Not Big Bar Exclusive," Klam-Ity Kourier, Willow Creek, California, July 23, 1980}
