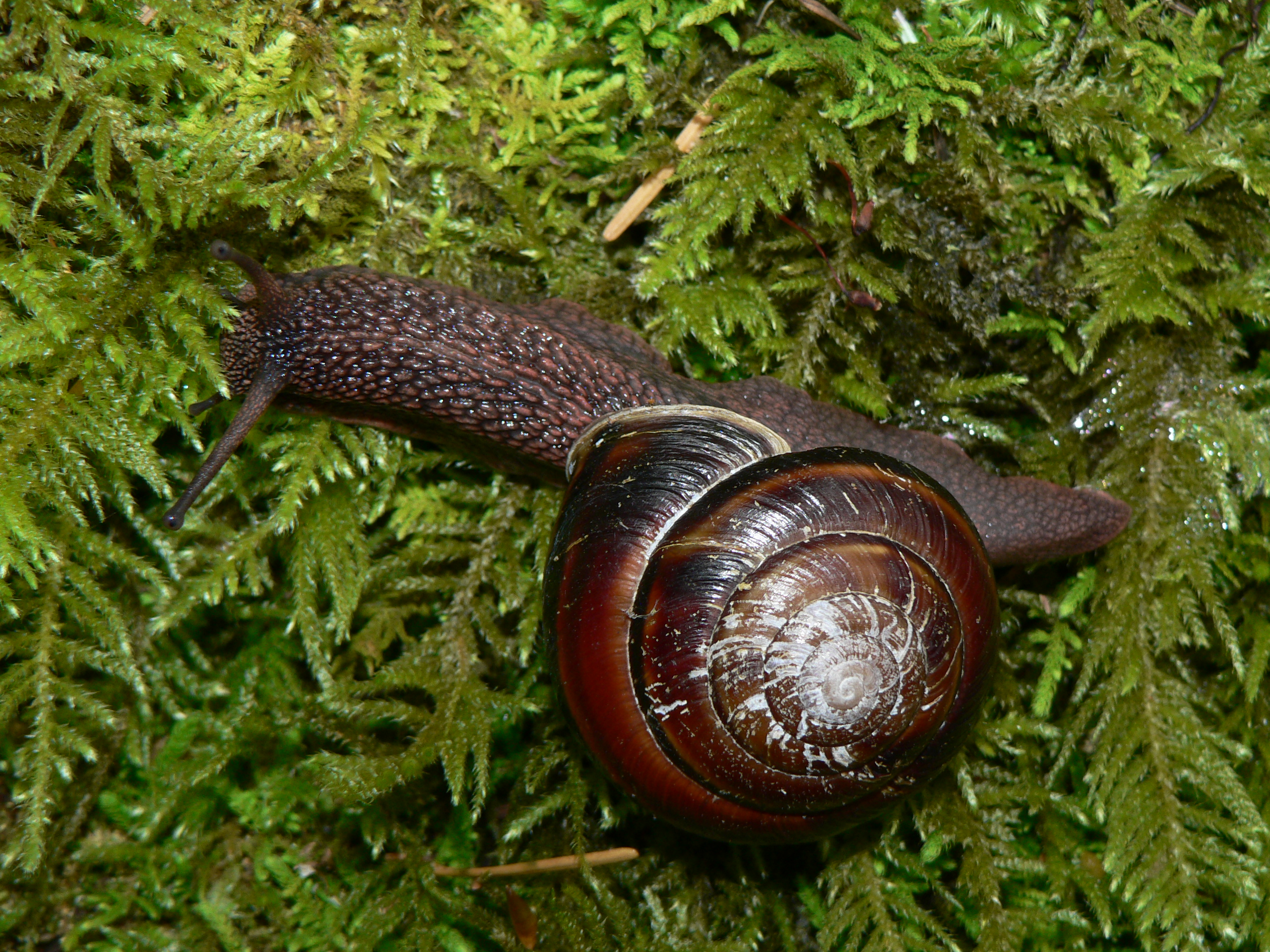
- Monadenia fidelis

Scientific classification
- Kingdom: Animalia
- Phylum: Mollusca
- Class: Gastropoda
- Order: Stylommatophora
- Superfamily: Helicoidea
- Family: Xanthonychidae
- Subfamily: Monadeniinae
- Genus: Monadenia; Pilsbry, 1895

Synonyms
- Epiphragmophora (Monadenia) Pilsbry, 1895; Monadenia (Corynadenia) Berry, 1940· accepted, alternate representation; Monadenia (Monadenia) Pilsbry, 1895· accepted, alternate representation; Monadenia (Shastelix) B. Roth, 1981· accepted, alternate representation

= Monadenia =

Genus of gastropods

Monadenia is a genus of air-breathing land snails in the subfamily Monadeniinae.

These pulmonate, terrestrial molluscs belong to the gastropod class.

Snails in this genus create and use love darts as part of their mating behavior.

== Species ==
Accepted names within the genus Monadenia include:

- † Monadenia antecedens (Stearns, 1900)
- Monadenia callipeplus S.S. Berry, 1940
- Monadenia chaceana S.S. Berry, 1940
- Monadenia churchi Hanna & A.G. Smith, 1933
- Monadenia circumcarinata (Stearns, 1879) - keeled sideband
- Monadenia cristulata S.S. Berry, 1940
- † Monadenia dubiosa (Stearns, 1902)
- Monadenia fidelis (J. E. Gray, 1834)
- Monadenia infumata (Gould, 1855)
- † Monadenia marginicola (Conrad, 1871)
- Monadenia mariposa A.G. Smith, 1957
- Monadenia marmarotis S.S. Berry, 1940
- Monadenia mormonum (L. Pfeiffer, 1857)
- Monadenia ochromphalus S. S. Berry, 1937
- Monadenia setosa Talmadge, 1952
- Monadenia subcarinata (Hemphill, 1892)
- Monadenia troglodytes G. D. Hanna & A. G. Smith, 1933
- Monadenia tuolumneana S.S. Berry, 1955
- Monadenia yosemitensis (H.N. Lowe, 1916)

Species brought into synonymy:

- Monadenia hillebrandi (Newcomb, 1864): synonym of Monadenia mormonum hillebrandi (Newcomb, 1864)
- Monadenia rotifer S. S. Berry, 1940: synonym of Monadenia marmarotis S.S. Berry, 1940
- Monadenia semialba Henderson, 1929: synonym of Monadenia fidelis fidelis (Gray, 1834)
