= Taklon =

Synthetic fiber

Taklon is the common name for a synthetic fiber used in artist-quality paint, makeup, shaving and pin stripe brushes. It is a smooth, soft, and somewhat fragile polyester derivative devoid of any protein component or allergen elements and is therefore used in the cosmetic industries as a "green," "vegan," "allergy free" or synthetic alternative to animal hair brushes.

== History ==
DuPont invented the process for making Taklon, in which a polyester fiber known as PBT (polybutylene terephthalate) is extruded and tapered to a fine point. Toray Chemical Co. of Osaka, Japan, acquired the process and the rights to make Taklon, which was originally designed to mimic the handling characteristics of natural sable.

== Use in makeup brushes ==
Taklon brushes are more hygienic than real hair brushes, since natural hair has an irregular surface which traps powders, dead skin cells, bacteria and chemicals. Cleaning may not necessarily remove these particles. Because of this, regular cleaning with disinfectants is required to prevent skin irritation. Taklon lacks these surface irregularities, making it easier to clean properly, which decreases potential irritation. Because Taklon is synthetic, animal cruelty is not an issue.

== Use in artist-quality brushes ==
Taklon is made in several sizes, ranging from 0.08 mm to .15 mm, which mimic hair, to .20 mm, which mimics boar bristle. The diameter affects the stiffness or softness of the brush. Diameter variation in the Taklon fibers creates more space between the filaments, allowing the brush to carry more liquid. It is available in black, gold, and white colors to indicate a brush’s stiffness, with black having the softest and most flexible fibers, gold being midrange in softness, and white being the stiffest.
