= Kolinsky sable-hair brush =

Type of paint brush

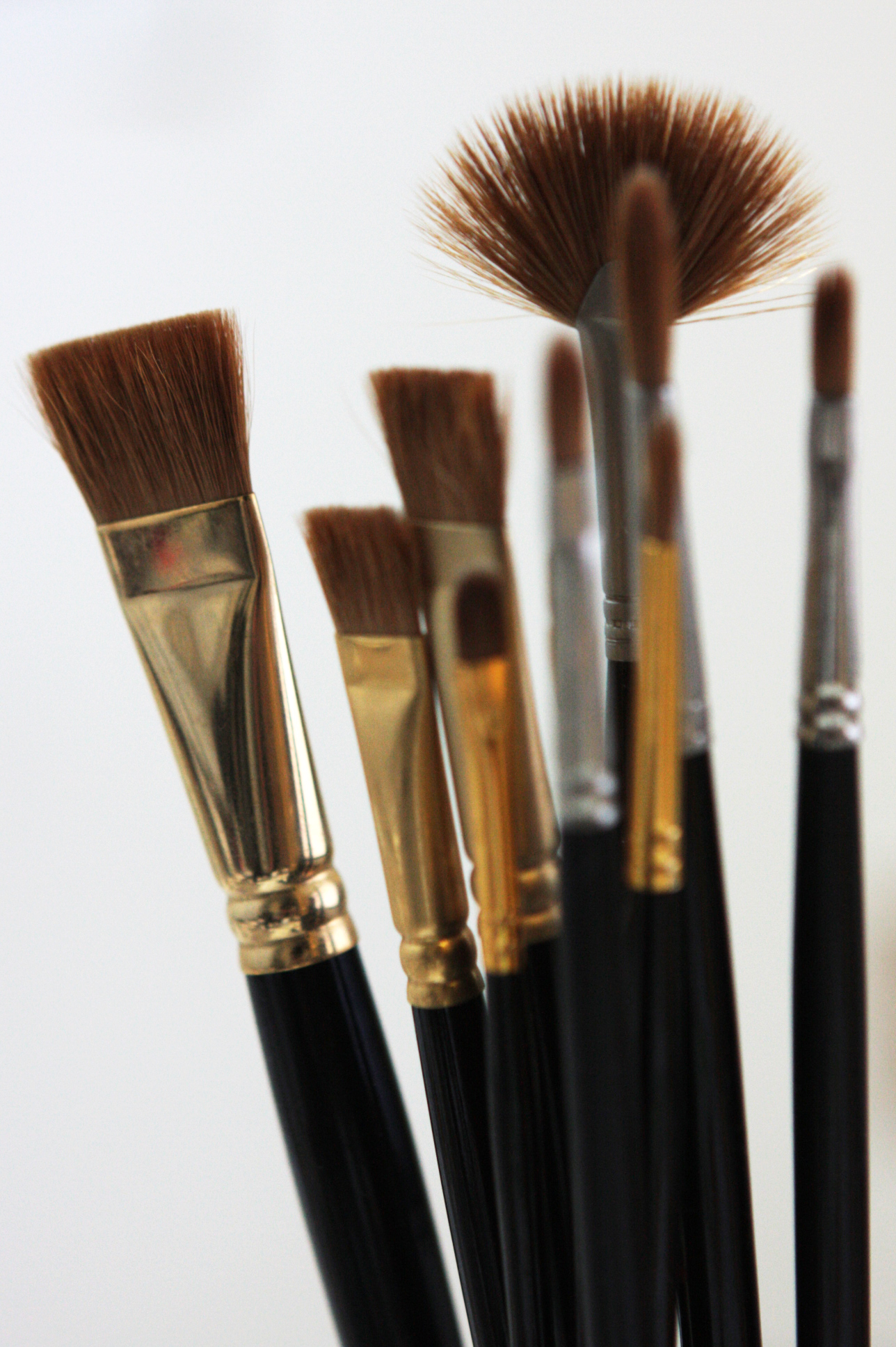
Kolinsky sable-hair artist brushes

A kolinsky sable-hair brush (also known as red sable or sable hair brush) is a fine artists' paintbrush.

The hair is obtained from the tail of the kolinsky (Mustela sibirica), a species of weasel, rather than an actual sable. The "finest" brushes are made from the male hair only, but most brushes have a mix of about 60/40 male-to-female hair. Kolinsky bristles tend to be pale red in colour with darker tips. The weasel is not an animal that is raised well in captivity, and is generally isolated to the geographical region of Siberia.

The brushes are also often sought after in figure painting for their ability to hold a fine tip and an appropriate amount of paint and moisture.

Due to their exceptional ability to be finely shaped, kolinsky sable brushes are highly prized in the dental ceramics industry, where they are used to hand-tint the ceramic appliances for a realistic appearance.

Beginning in 2013, shipments to the U.S. of kolinsky hair brushes were halted and in some cases seized by the U.S. Fish and Wildlife Service due to the kolinsky's inclusion in the international CITES agreement.

== See also ==
- Camel-hair brush
