= Stylophore =

Architectural element

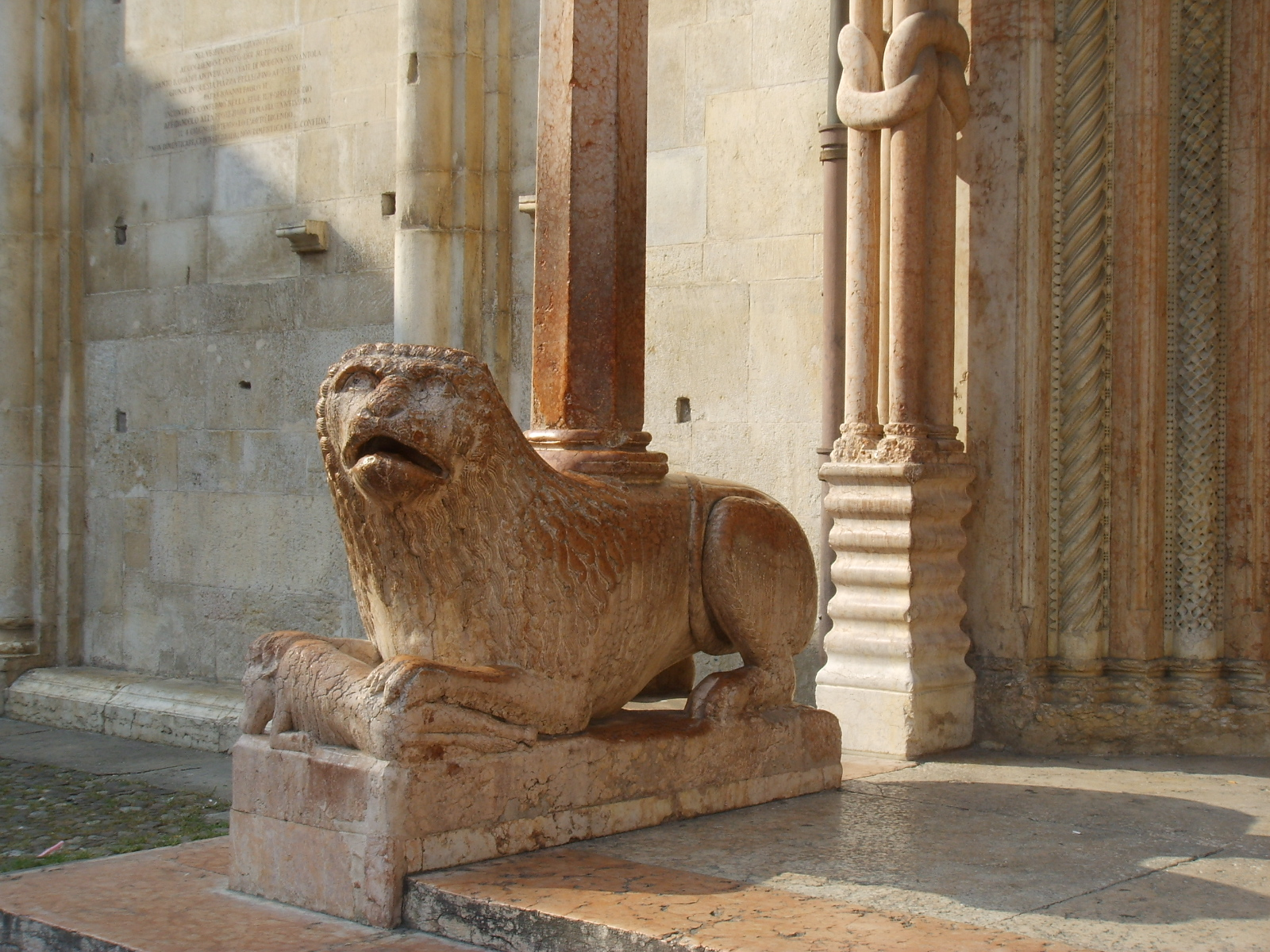
Stylophore lion at the entrance of Modena Cathedral

Stylophore (from στῦλος — “pillar” or “column”, and φέρω — “to carry” or “to support”) is an architectural element, a sculpture placed at the lower part of a column, resting on a stylobate or on a special pedestal. On the upper part of the stylophore there is a platform on which the column rests. The shape and size of a stylophore may vary depending on the architectural style and functional purpose of the building; a stylophore may serve as the base of a column or complement it. The use of stylophores helps ensure the stability of columns and distribute their weight over a larger surface. Stylophores were used in the architecture of Romanesque and Gothic churches, including in the decoration of Prothyrums. The sculptural image of a stylophore may be a human or an animal — real or imaginary — such as a lion, the most numerous, as well as griffin, elephants, oxen, etc.

== Stylophore lions ==
Especially often, stylophores were represented by sculptures of lions placed at the entrances of Romanesque and Gothic churches.

The lion has a polyvalent symbolic meaning as a symbolic guardian, since it is an animal that kills and devours its victims and transmits part of its strength to them. The victims pass through death to new life, a metamorphosis, overcoming the boundary between life and death; therefore the lion is a warning, a reminder of this transition and rupture between two different realms — the sacred and the profane. In medieval iconography, the lion is also a symbol of divine justice. At the same time merciful and implacable, the lion became in Romanesque iconography an allegory of Christ the Judge, loving towards the good and relentless towards the wicked. The lion holding in its paws a lamb, a deer, a bird, or a human figure, as a sign of supremacy and at the same time protection, is frequently found in small Romanesque porches — protires, especially in Italy and Provence, as well as on pulpits of the 13th and 14th centuries (in the Pisa Baptistery and Siena Cathedral, works by Nicola Pisano, in the church of Sant'Andrea in Pistoia and in the Pisa Cathedral) — this is a metaphor of Christ protecting the faithful. In Poland, stylophore lions are known from the 12th and 13th centuries, particularly in Kraków (pairs preserved in the National Museum), Wrocław, and Sandomierz, where they adorned Romanesque churches and monasteries, reflecting Italian influences.

In Christianity, the lion is a symbol of “Fortitudo”, or “moral strength”, steadfastness in faith and the ability to overcome trials and temptations. In the context of Christian ethics and the doctrine of Fortitudo, the lion is a symbol enabling believers to overcome difficulties and temptations, and to remain faithful to their principles and convictions. A lion placed at the entrance of a church also symbolizes the strength guarding the sacred space.

According to medieval bestiaries, the lion is also a symbol of Christ. In the Book of Revelation Christ is called “the Lion of the Tribe of Judah”.

As a symbol, the lion represents an ancient zoomorphic motif occupying a particularly prominent place in medieval architecture. Emblematic of Saint Mark the Evangelist, the lion in the apocalyptic vision of John, appears next to the throne of Christ, in the lower left corner, on the side of the elect on the day of the Last Judgment, and is the only one, besides the Lamb of God, worthy of the privilege of opening the book and removing the seven seals. Companion of Saint Jerome, according to hagiographic tradition, the lion is also a ritual animal that mercifully ensures the burial in the desert of Saint Anthony the Abbot and Saint Mary of Egypt. In Christian iconography the lion acquired semantic meanings, sometimes contradictory, due to a constant oscillation between positive and negative values, between good and evil.

== Gallery ==
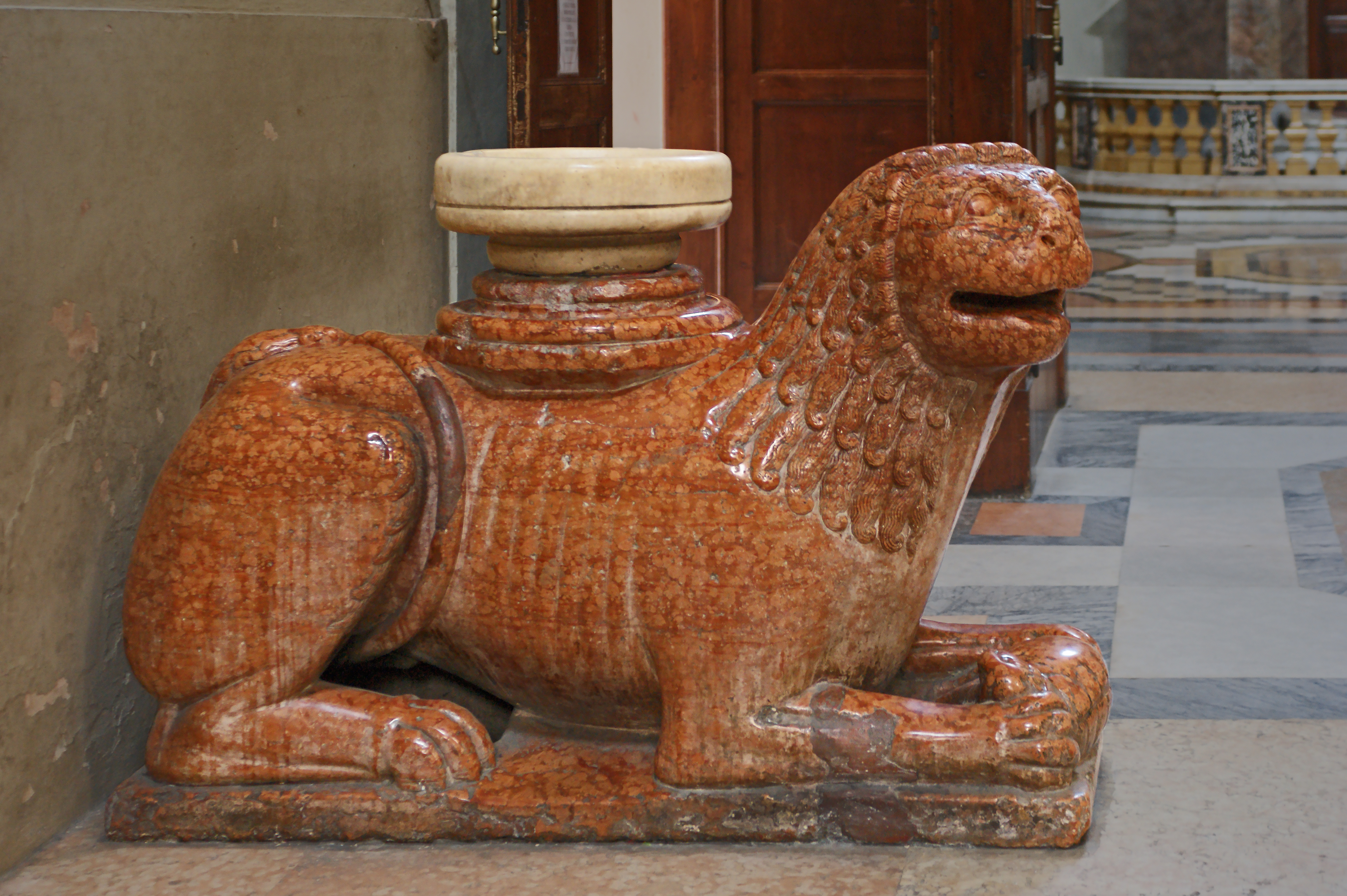
From St. Peter's Cathedral, Bologna

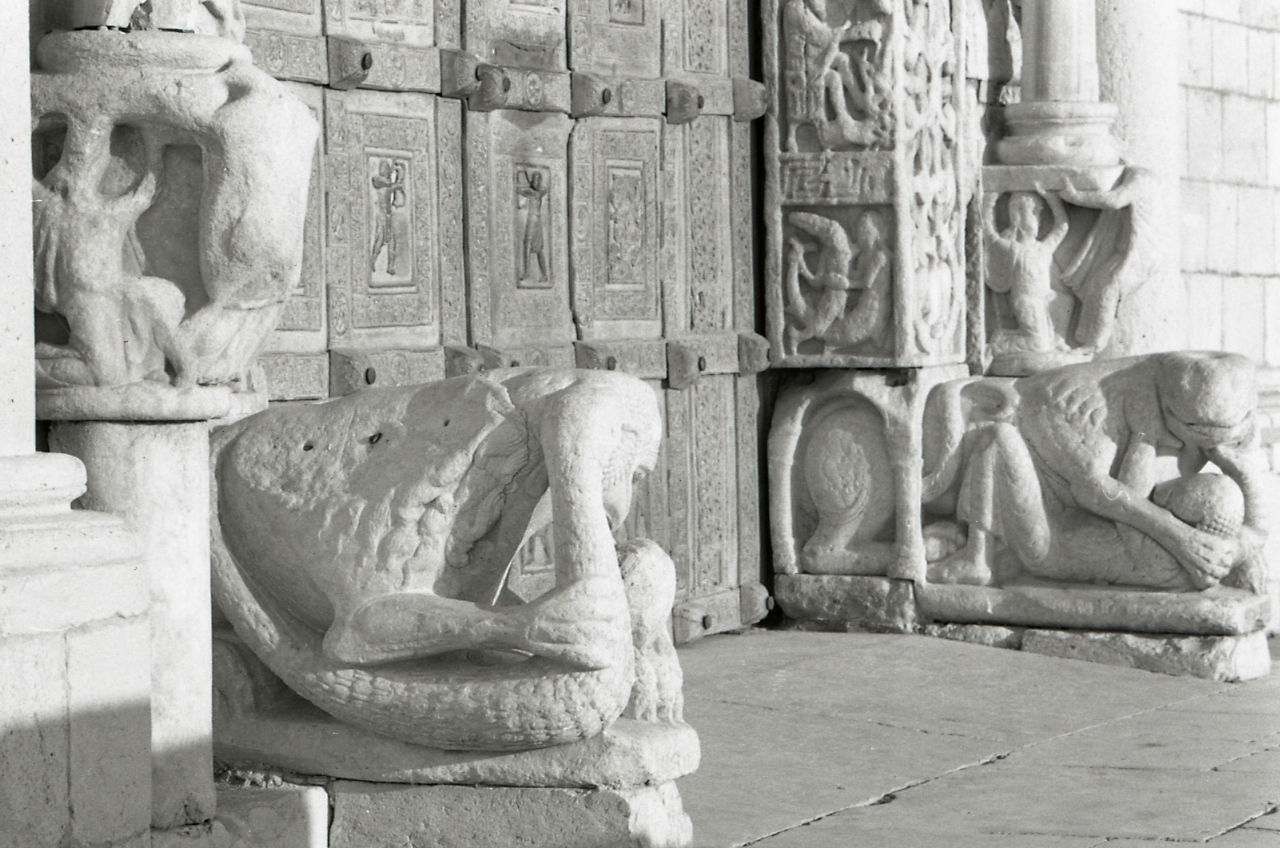
At the entrance of Trani Cathedral (Apulia)

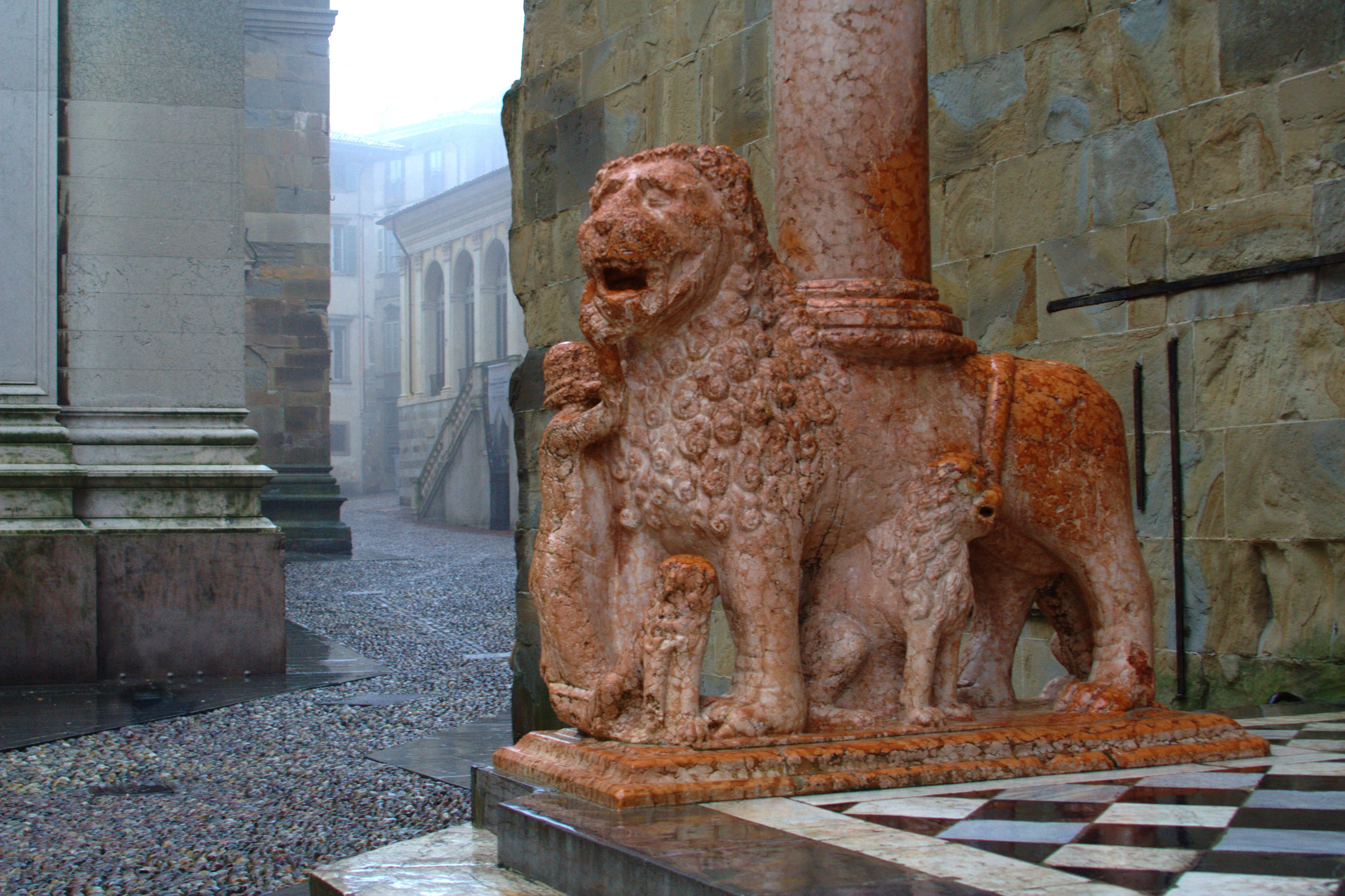
At the church of Santa Maria Maggiore, Bergamo

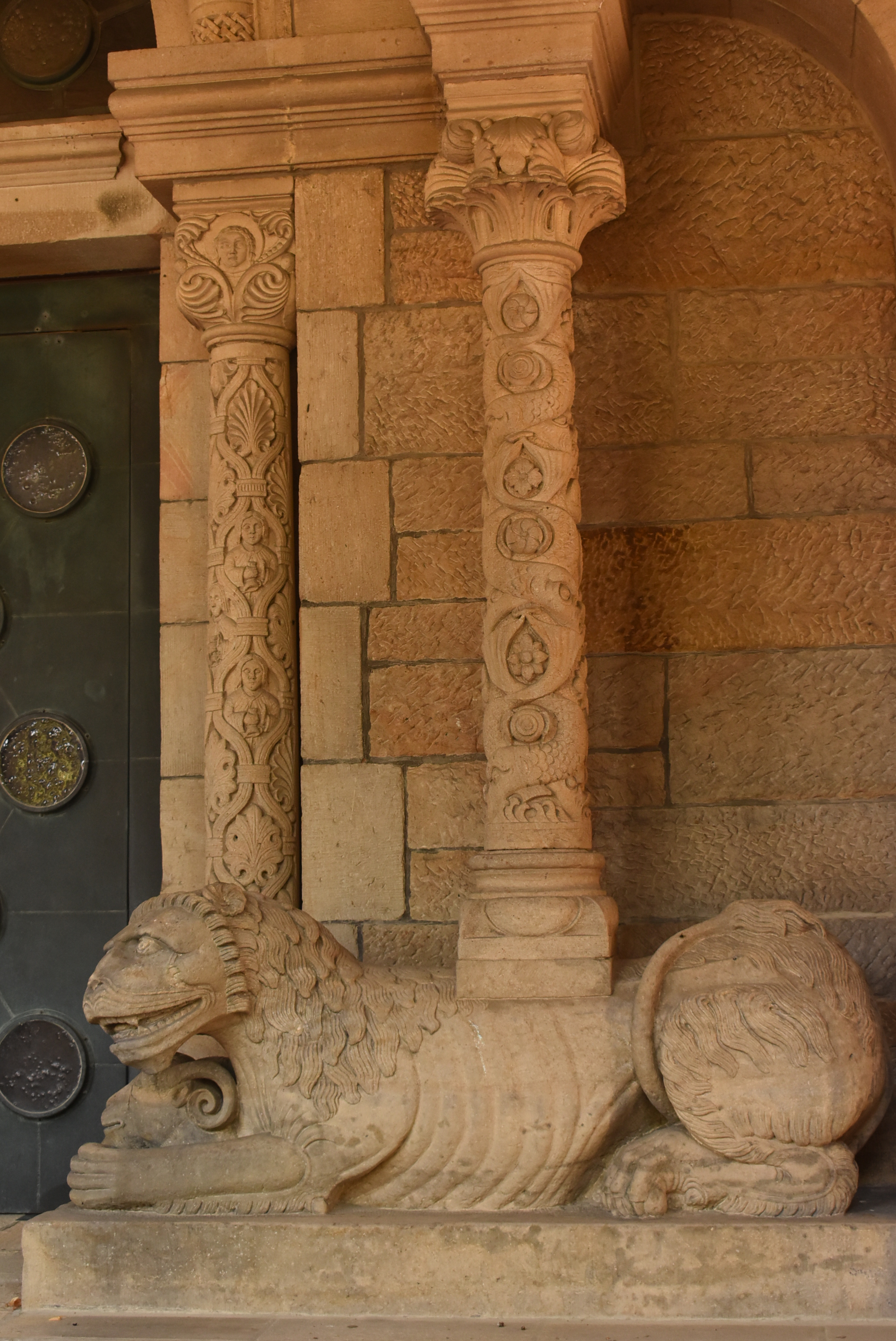
From the St Anthony's Basilica, Rheine in Rheine, North Rhine-Westphalia

== See also ==
- Caryatid
