= Tufting (composites) =

In the field of composite materials, tufting is an experimental technology to locally reinforce continuous fibre-reinforced plastics along the z-direction, with the objective of enhancing the shear and delamination resistance of the structure.

It consists of inserting a thread through a layered dry fabric, using a needle that, after insertion, moves back along the same trajectory leaving a loop of the thread on the bottom of the structure. It is a technology developed for and used within the thermoset resin injection manufacturing route, however it is currently being debated whether pre-pregs can also be successfully tufted. Tufting is considered a more economical and flexible method compared to 3D weaving or 3D braiding to include z-fibres in laminated composites. It resembles stitching, but it is different in that tufting only requires access from one side of the preform. Depending on the equipment used, all shapes and forms may potentially be reinforced by tufting. The density of z-fibres inserted can vary according to the expected loading pattern. On the other hand, the increase of z-properties in the dry preform is comparably low because tufting comprises no force-fit. Consequently, before consolidation, tufted preforms are not easier to handle than unreinforced ones. In fact the loops can represent an added complexity for the resin infusion process as they can complicate the consolidation of the structure.

== See also ==
- Z-pinning
- Plastics
