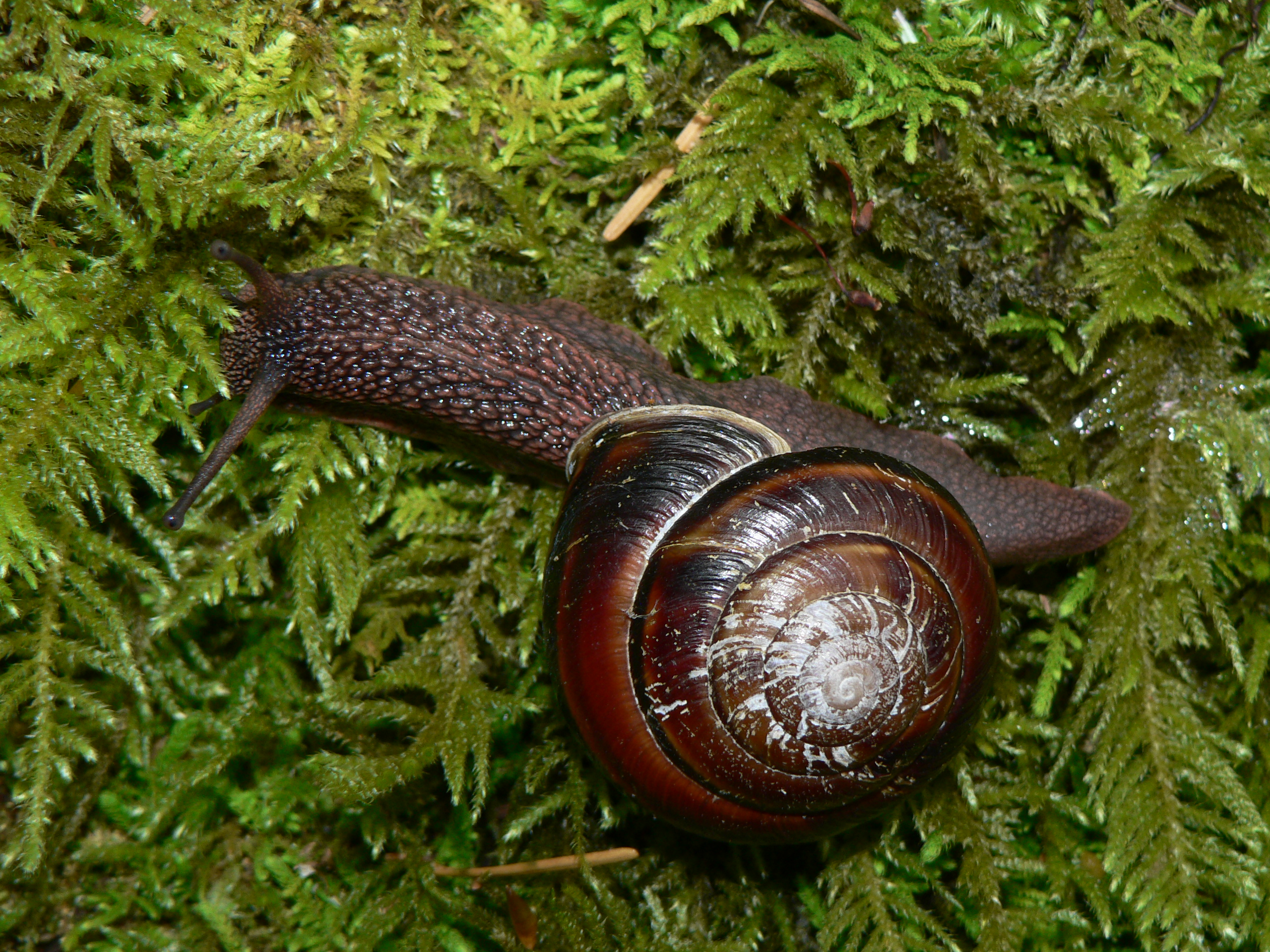
- A live individual of Monadenia fidelis

Scientific classification
- Kingdom: Animalia
- Phylum: Mollusca
- Class: Gastropoda
- Order: Stylommatophora
- Family: Xanthonychidae
- Subfamily: Monadeniinae; H. Nordsieck, 1987

Genera
- See text

= Monadeniinae =

Subfamily of gastropods

Monadeniinae is a taxonomic subfamily of small to medium-sized air-breathing land snails, terrestrial pulmonate gastropod mollusks in the family Xanthonychidae.

== Anatomy ==
This subfamily is defined by an absent diverticulum. The species have one dart apparatus, a stylophore (dart sac), one mucous gland, with a muscular duct that is inserted at base of the dart sac.

== Genera ==
Genera within the subfamily Modaneiinae include:

- Monadenia Pilsbry, 1895 - type genus
