= Brush =

Tool with bristles used for cleaning, grooming, or applying liquid coatings

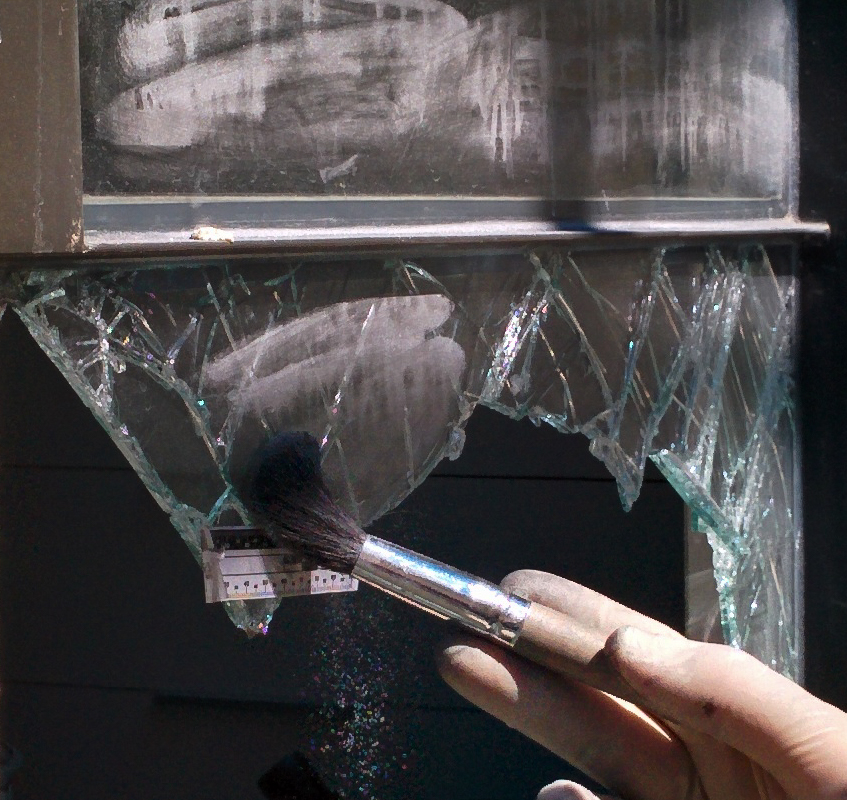
Forensic dusting of a crime scene using fingerprint powder and a specialized brush

A brush is a common tool with bristles, wire, or other filaments. It generally comprises a handle or block to which filaments are affixed in either a parallel or perpendicular orientation, depending on the way the brush is to be gripped during use. The material of both the block and bristles or filaments is chosen to withstand hazards of its intended use, such as corrosive chemicals, heat, or abrasion. It is used for cleaning, grooming hair, makeup, painting, surface finishing, and many other purposes. It is one of the most basic and versatile tools in use today, and the average household may contain several dozen varieties.

== History ==
Brush manufacturing extends back to the Egyptians around 3500 BC, with rudimentary paint brushes made from split palm leaves and animal hair. These brushes were made by hand, where dry leaves and fibers would be tied to tree branches that served as the handle. The applications were for pottery decoration and tomb wall painting. In parallel, China also began the development of its own brushes around the same time. Most of the applications for brushes were for decorating, and the first writing brushes represent a variation in manufacturing. With over 120 processes, from selecting materials to finished products, to choose from, this expanded the capabilities of what a manufactured brush could do. The Huzhou ink brush reflects the culmination of the early brush manufacturing era as an established pioneer of writing tools.

During the renaissance, brushes became extremely specialized, and the round brush dominated this era. This is partly thanks to the documentation done at the time in Il libro dell'arte by Cennino Cennini. Flat brushes had not developed yet due to technological limitations in ferrule construction.

The 1700s is when the first mass-produced toothbrush was created. William Addis, following his imprisonment, was the first to pioneer drilling holes into a substrate to then secure ferrules with glue. The established manufacturing principle it follows is reminiscent of staple-set brush manufacturing that is used today.

The next major advancement was the utilization of metal ferrules in brush making. Using metal instead of regular animal hairs or organic fibers created a product which had superior durability and shape retention. This expanded the possible applications for brush products, and with more robust brushes, a new technique was developed to manufacture these products. Instead of using a wire or cord to secure the bristles to the base, now there would be a metal extrusion like a U-channel produced. The bristles would be inserted into the U-channel, and the metal extrusion would be crimped to hold the bristles in place. This mechanically secured way of holding brushes is seen widely today in industrial strip brushes. This prevented an issue at the time where moisture would get between the handle and brush, separating it.

The industrial revolution in the 18th and 19th centuries marked the mechanization and mass production turning point for brush manufacturing. In the 1850s, the first machines designed for drilling brush handles were patented. Anton Zahoransky is noted as the pioneer and founder of what would become brush-inserting machines.

When houses were first inhabited, homeowners used branches taken from shrubs to sweep up dirt, hence using the first brushes. In 1859, the first brush factory in America was set up in New York.

== Manufacturing ==
There are two main ways for manufacturing brushes with modern-day CNC. With a machine, the stock will be prepared to be loaded into the machine, where a filament gauge takes a specific amount of material from the stock. The bristles or brush filaments historically have been done with staples or anchors. This is called tufting (composites). First, a hole is drilled into the material which the bristles will be set in. These bristles are inserted into the middle of a hole with a special driver. This driver contains the staple which will hold the brush firmly in the material. The staple can also be replaced with a kind of anchor, which is a piece of rectangular profile wire that is anchored to the wall of the hole, like in most toothbrushes. Another way to attach the bristles to the surface can be found in a fused brush, in which instead of being inserted into a hole, a plastic fiber is welded to another plastic surface, giving the option to use different diameters of bristles in the same brush.

In industrial applications, modern tufting machines are used to speed up the process. This includes adjustable tufting angles, tufting speed, and tension control. These machines use a tufting tool that inserts tufts of filament into a brush base or backing material, accommodating natural bristles, synthetic fibers, or combinations of both. Advanced 5-axis brush-making machines enable the creation of highly complex and customizable brush designs with precise tufting arrangements.

Epoxy-set is another industrial method for creating brushes. Two primary insertion methods are employed: pure epoxy-set, where crimped filament bundles are friction-held until resin application, and dual-retention systems (DRS) that combine stainless steel U-staples with epoxy sealing for enhanced security. This construction method finds critical applications in food processing, pharmaceutical manufacturing, and aerospace industries where filament retention and contamination prevention are paramount. The epoxy seal eliminates tuft cavities that could harbor bacteria, making these brushes essential for HACCP compliance and cleanroom environments. Design variants include embedded abrasive-nylon casts for heavy-duty deburring and metal-free configurations for X-ray detectable systems. While offering superior performance, epoxy-set brushes command higher costs due to material complexity and extended processing times, with end-of-life recycling challenges addressed through emerging bio-epoxy formulations and supplier take-back programs.

== Materials/Filaments ==
Brush filaments vary with use, but are all dependent on physical properties. Material modulus, filament diameter, and trim length all determine how much resistance to force a brush will give, which is universal for almost all cases of brush applications. Bend recovery measures the material's ability to return to its former shape after deformation and is widely tested on brush filaments. Besides this, flexing tests to determine cycle lifetime predict fatigue in brush materials. For higher-level industrial applications like aerospace or the food industry; materials optimized for use must fulfill certain criteria like abrasion resistance, chemical compatibility, thermal resistance, and corrosion resistance.

Nylon - used in applications calling for low water absorption, good recovery, and abrasion resistance. Found in industrial cleaning applications where abrasiveness is needed, with different surface finishing, the nylon can be more abrasive.

Polyester - Similar to nylon but specific for applications that do not absorb moisture. Bend recovery is superior in this regard.

Polypropylene - Used for a wide variety of applications due to its wet stiffness, abrasive tip cleaning action, lower bend recovery than nylon, and its inertness to most solvents, oils, acids, and chemicals. Found in food-safe applications.

Polystyrene - economical, flaggable filament used for aesthetics

Ixtle - Also known as Tampico, a biodegradable vegetable fiber with a soft-medium texture that can withstand high heat and softens in water

Metallic Wire - usually high-carbon steel, stainless steel, brass, or phosphorus bronze used for rust removal, cleaning metals, and other requirements.

Taklon - fine synthetic for art brushes

Animal hairs - What brush bristles used to be made of, hog hair, horsehair, goat hair, for smooth paint application due to their oil retention or any other applications.

== By function ==
=== Applicators ===
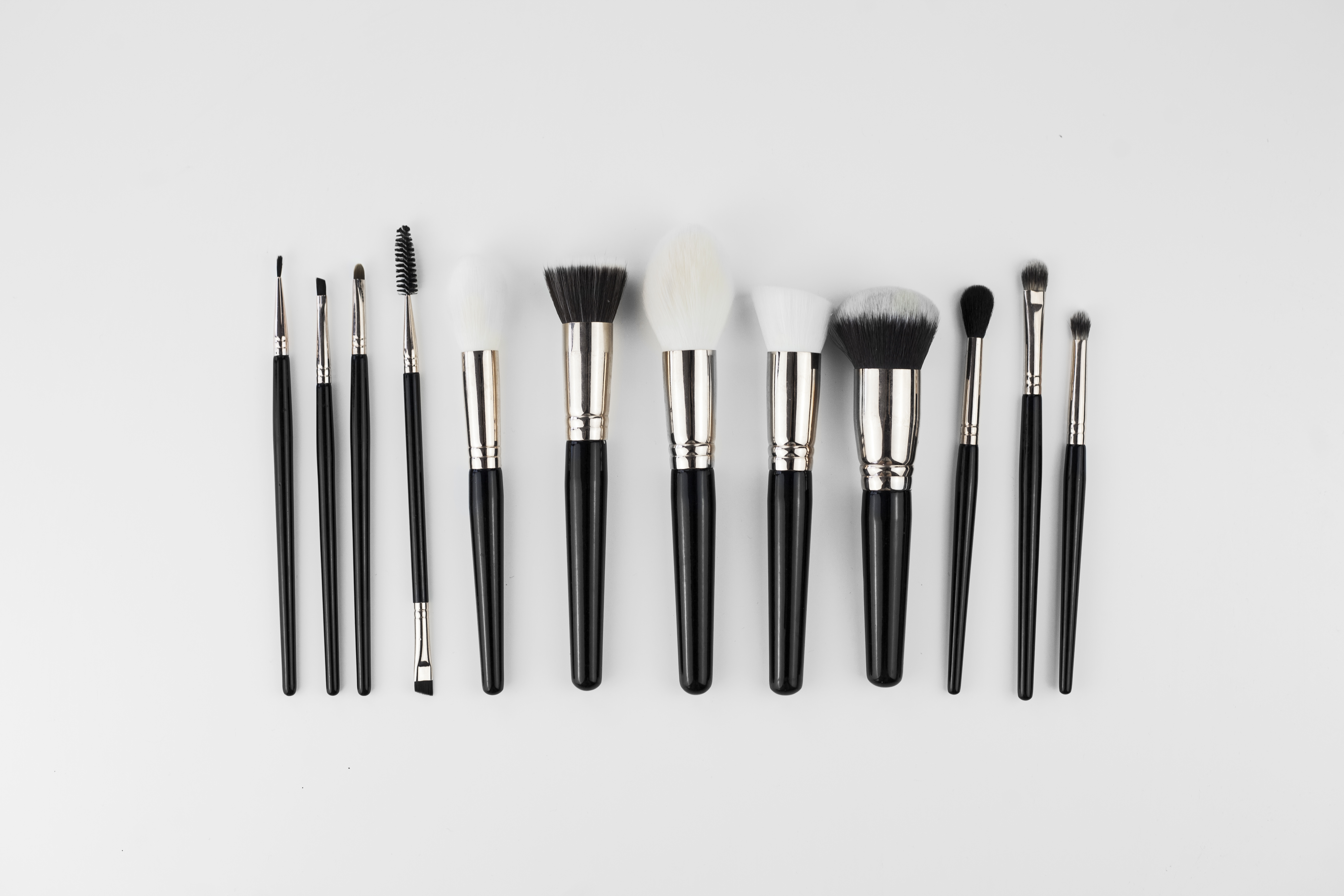
Assorted cosmetics and Makeup brushes

The action of such brushes is mostly from the sides, not the tip, contact with which releases material held by capillary action.

- Fingerprint forensic brush
- Gilding brush
- Ink brush
- Makeup brush
- Mascara brush
- Nail-polish brush
- Paintbrush (fine art or house decoration)
- Pastry brush
- Shaving brush
- Shoe-polish brush (polish applicator)
- Wallpaper brush

=== Combing ===
The action of these brushes is more like combing than brushing if they are used for straightening and untangling filaments. Certain varieties of hairbrush are, however, designed to brush the scalp itself free of material such as dead skin (dandruff) and to invigorate the skin of the scalp.

- Grooming brush
- Hairbrush

=== Other ===
- Brush (electric), used on electrical motors
- Acid brush, described as comprising glass threads, in 1906
- Acid brush, described as comprising horsehair held in a crimped copper tube, in 1922
- Clothes brush or lint brush
- Magnetic brush
- Medical sampling brush
- Brush percussion mallets
- Stippling brush (neither applies nor removes material, but merely adds pattern)
