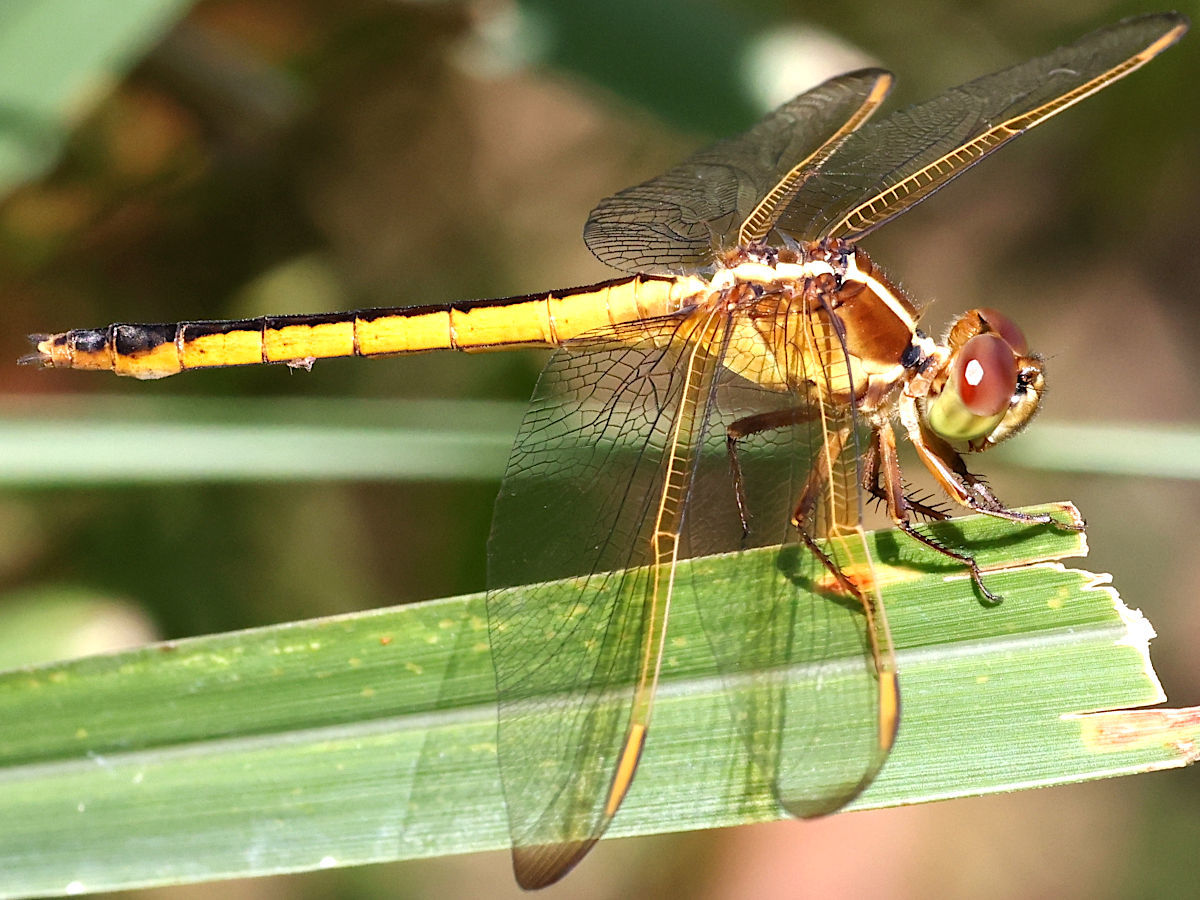
- Female
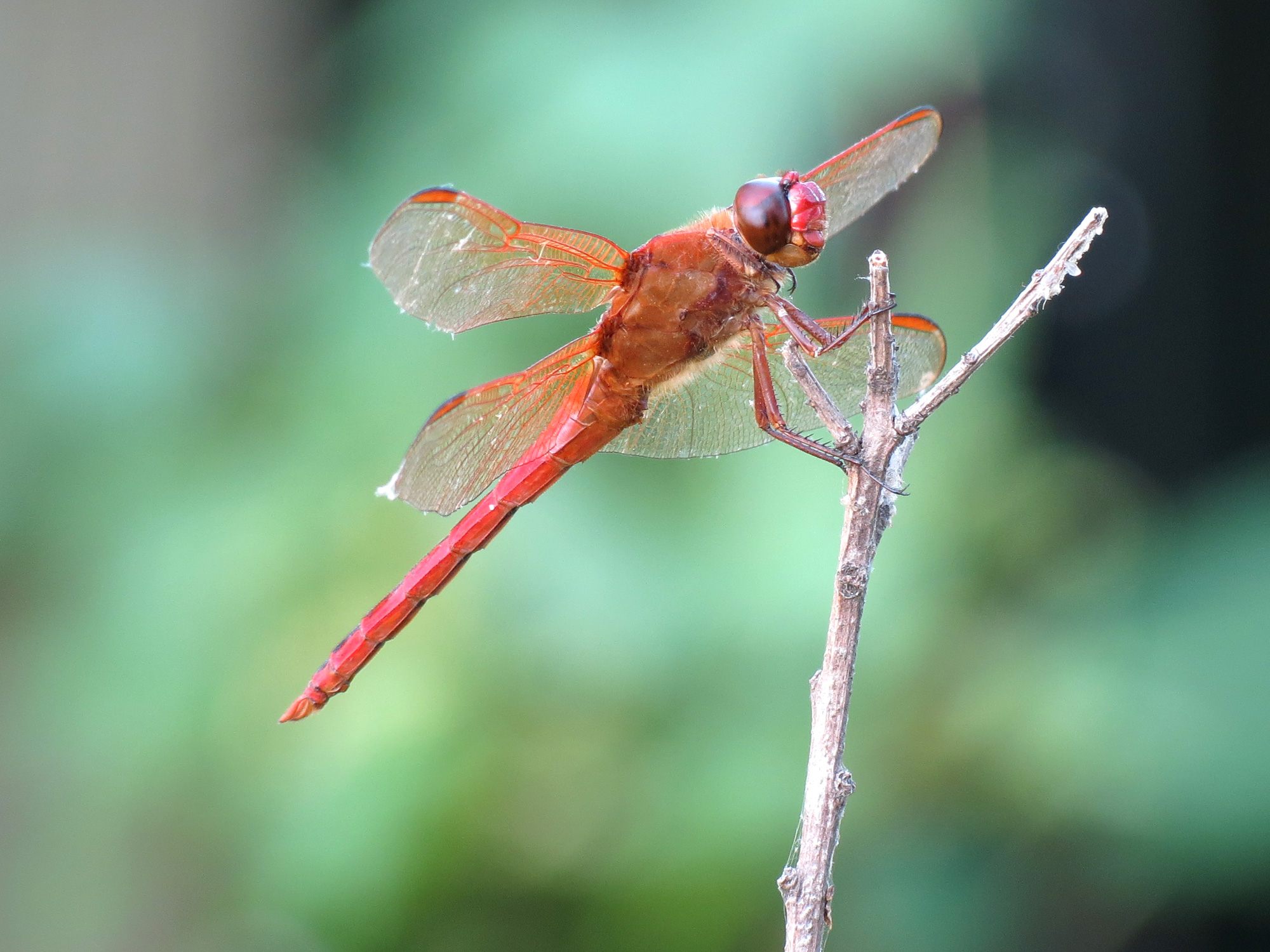
- Male

Conservation status
- Least Concern (IUCN 3.1)

Scientific classification
- Kingdom: Animalia
- Phylum: Arthropoda
- Clade: Pancrustacea
- Class: Insecta
- Order: Odonata
- Infraorder: Anisoptera
- Family: Libellulidae
- Genus: Libellula
- Species: L. needhami

Binomial name
- Libellula needhami Westfall, 1943

= Libellula needhami =

Species of dragonfly

Libellula needhami, or Needham's skimmer, is a species of skimmer in the family of dragonflies known as Libellulidae. It is found in the Bahamas, Cuba, Mexico, and the United States.

The IUCN conservation status of Libellula needhami is "LC", least concern, with no immediate threat to the species' existence. The population is stable.

The species is named after the American entomologist James George Needham.

== Description ==
Males have a red face, while females have a brown or yellow face.

This species can be separated from the very similar Libellula auripennis by the following:

- their posterior (rear) wing veins do not become orange
- their costa changes color on opposite sides of the node: outer half is lighter, inner half is darker
- their hind tibia are brown, not black
