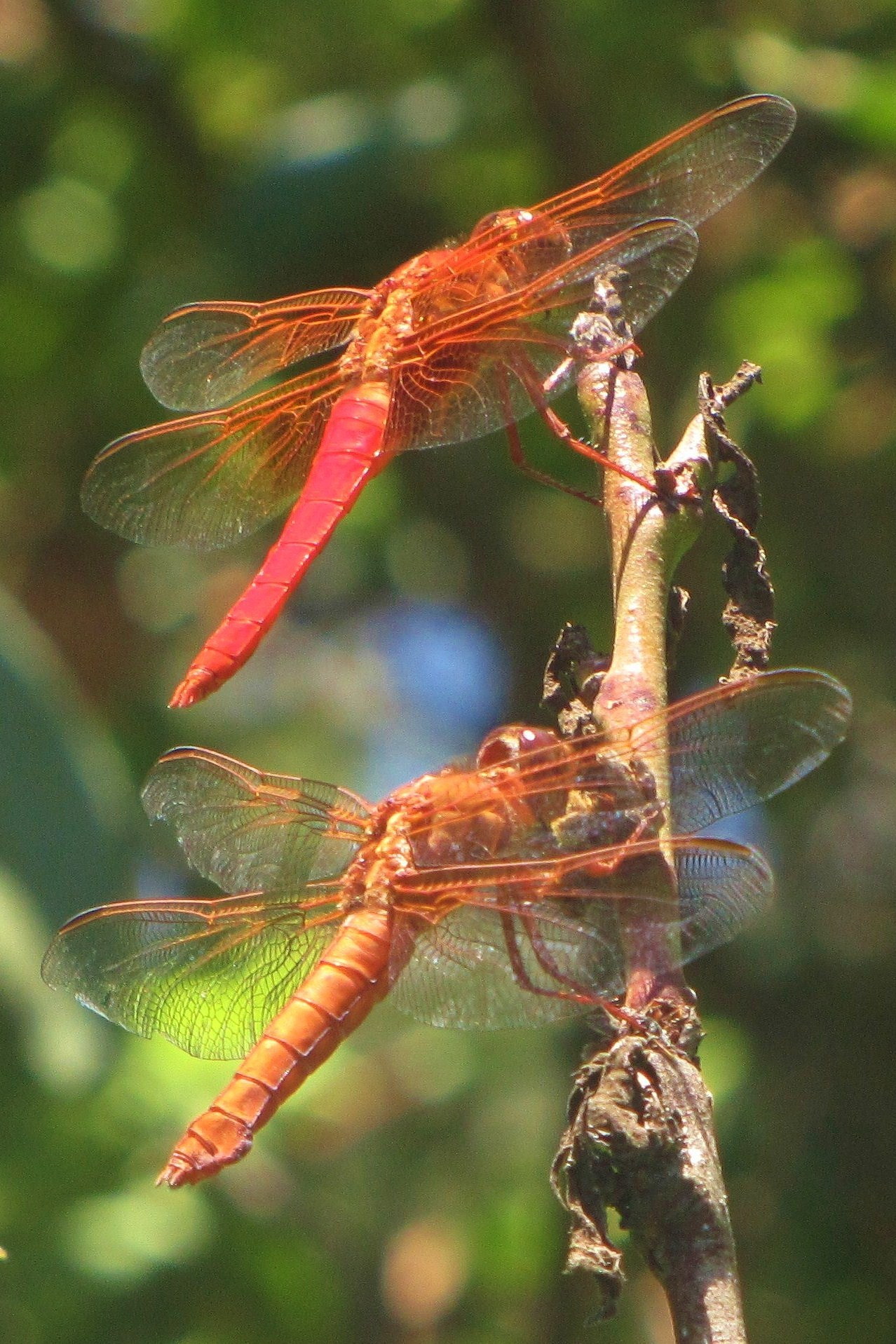
- top male bottom female

Scientific classification
- Kingdom: Animalia
- Phylum: Arthropoda
- Clade: Pancrustacea
- Class: Insecta
- Order: Odonata
- Infraorder: Anisoptera
- Family: Libellulidae
- Genus: Libellula
- Species: L. croceipennis

Binomial name
- Libellula croceipennis (Selys, 1868)

= Neon skimmer =

Species of dragonfly

The neon skimmer (Libellula croceipennis) is a dragonfly of the skimmer family. It can be found near ponds, lakes and slow moving streams in the southwest United States, Central America, and northern South America.

== Description ==
L. croceipennis reaches a length of 54 to 59 millimeters, of which 32 to 39 millimeters is the abdomen. The species is colored bright red on the face, on the front of the thorax, on the abdomen and on the abdominal appendages. Seen from the side, the thorax is brownish with a slight tinge of red. Furthermore, it has no patterns. Young animals, on the other hand, are reddish-brown with a yellow stripe along the top of the abdomen. The hind wings reach a length of 35 to 47 millimeters. On both wings of the males there is an amber-yellow shadow at the base, which extends to the wing triangle. The wings of the females are transparent. The pterostigma is brown and about 6 millimeters long. The legs are brown and have black bristles. The eighth abdominal segment is significantly widened in females.

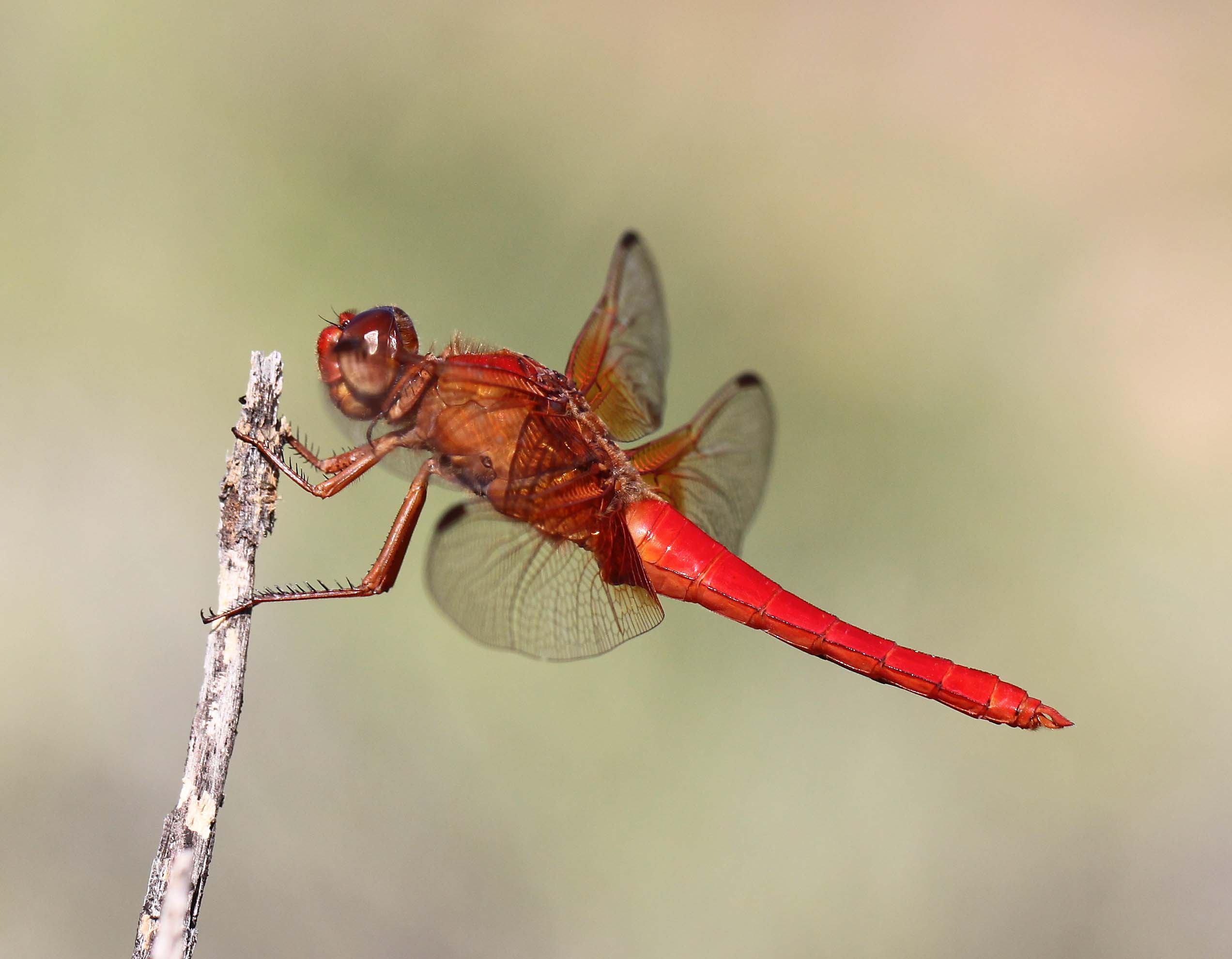
Male

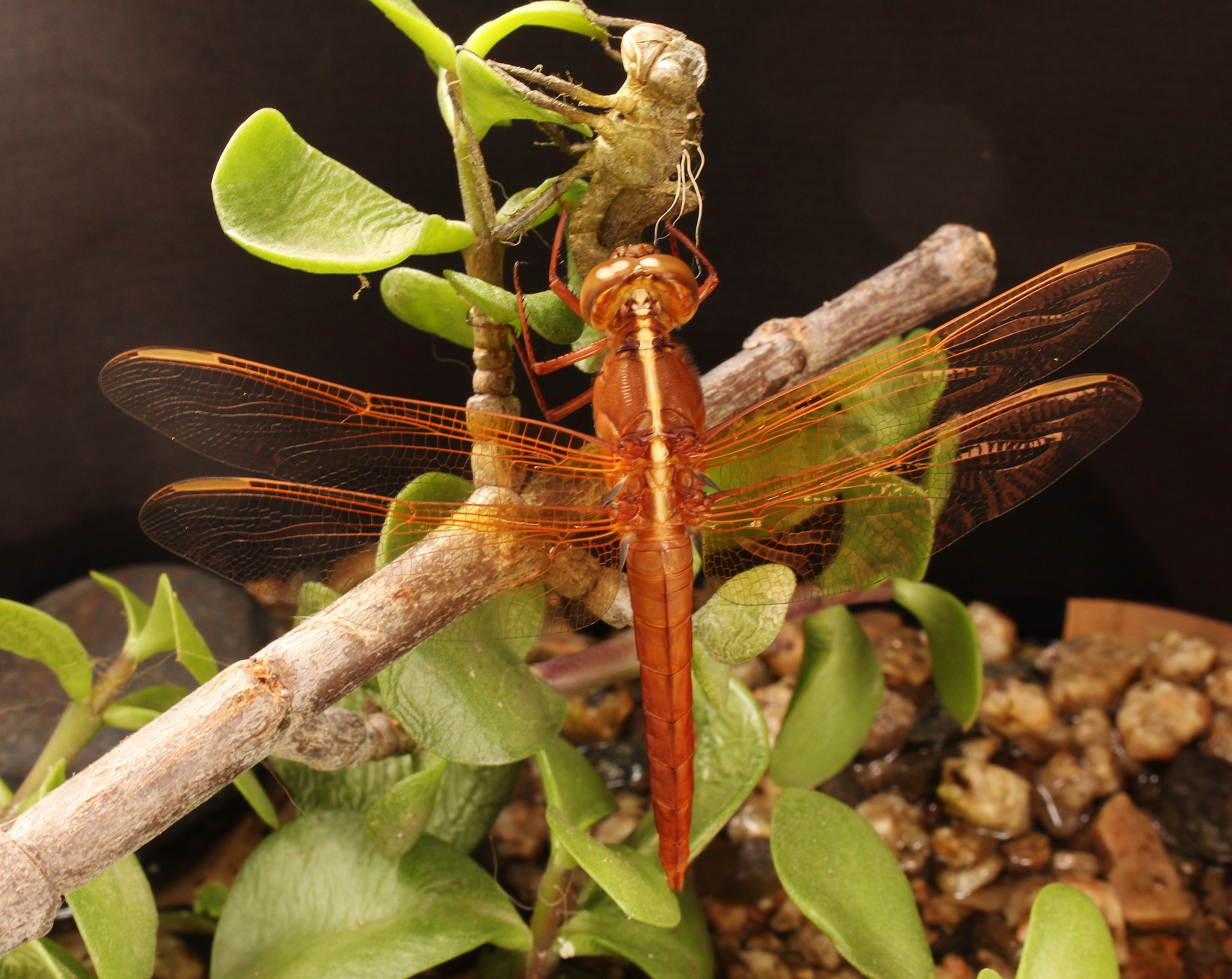
Teneral male

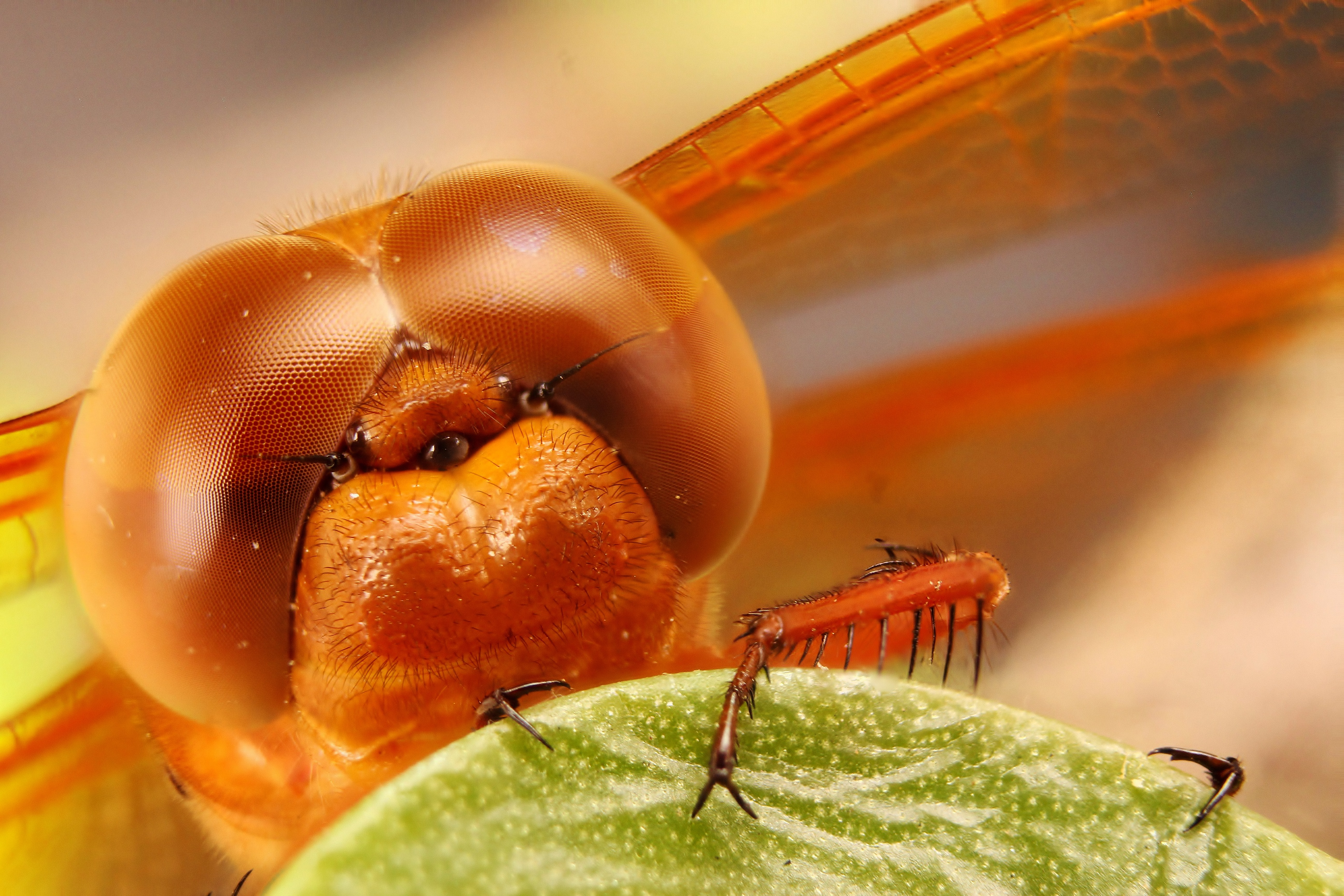
head

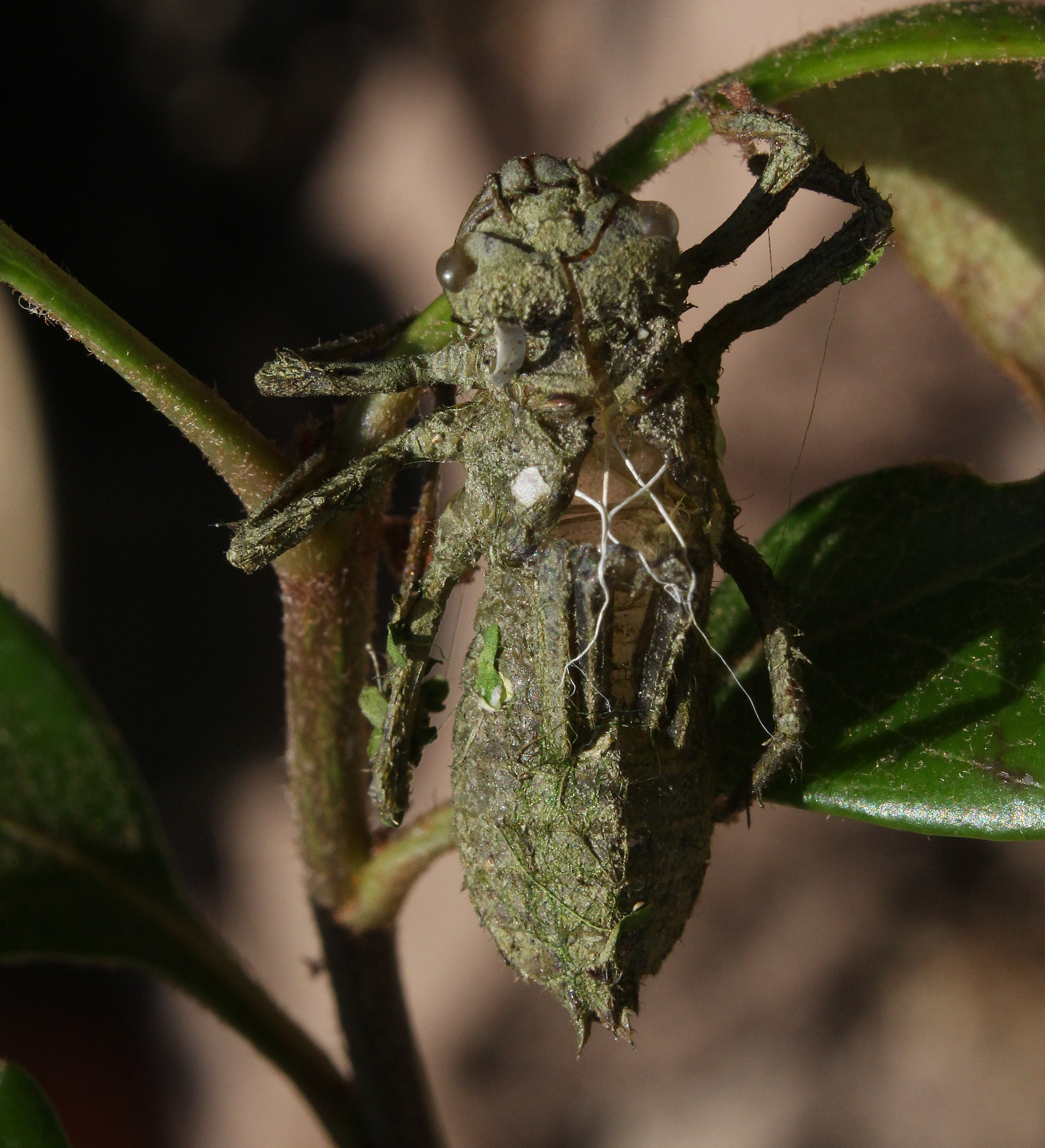
Molted Exoskeleton

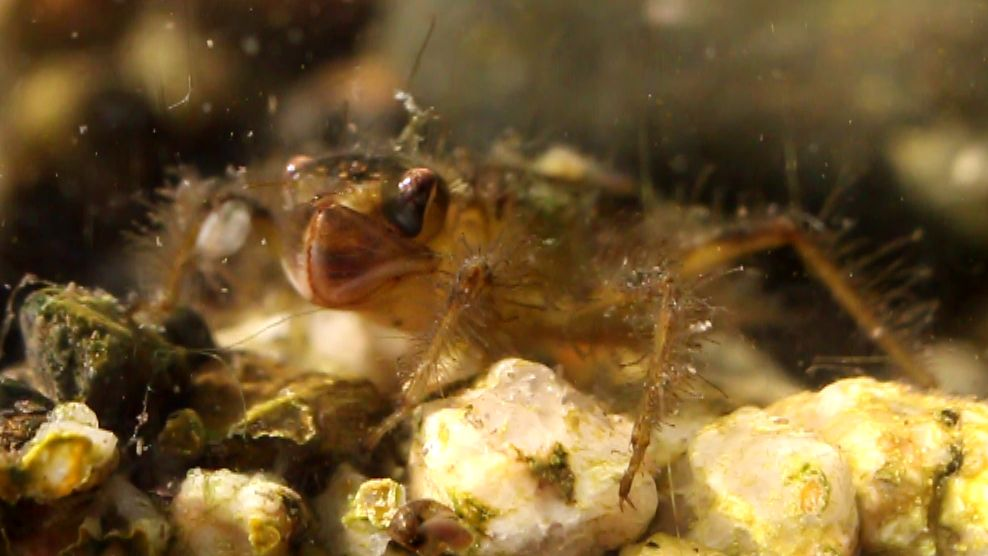
Nymph
