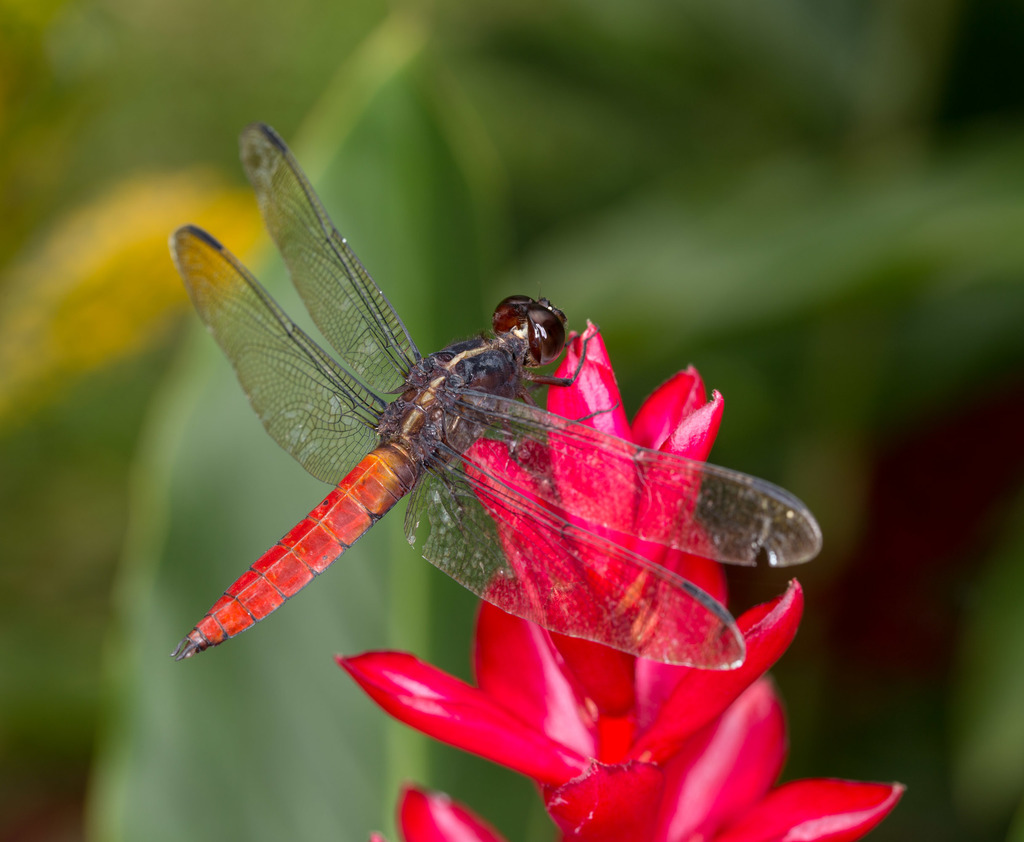
- male
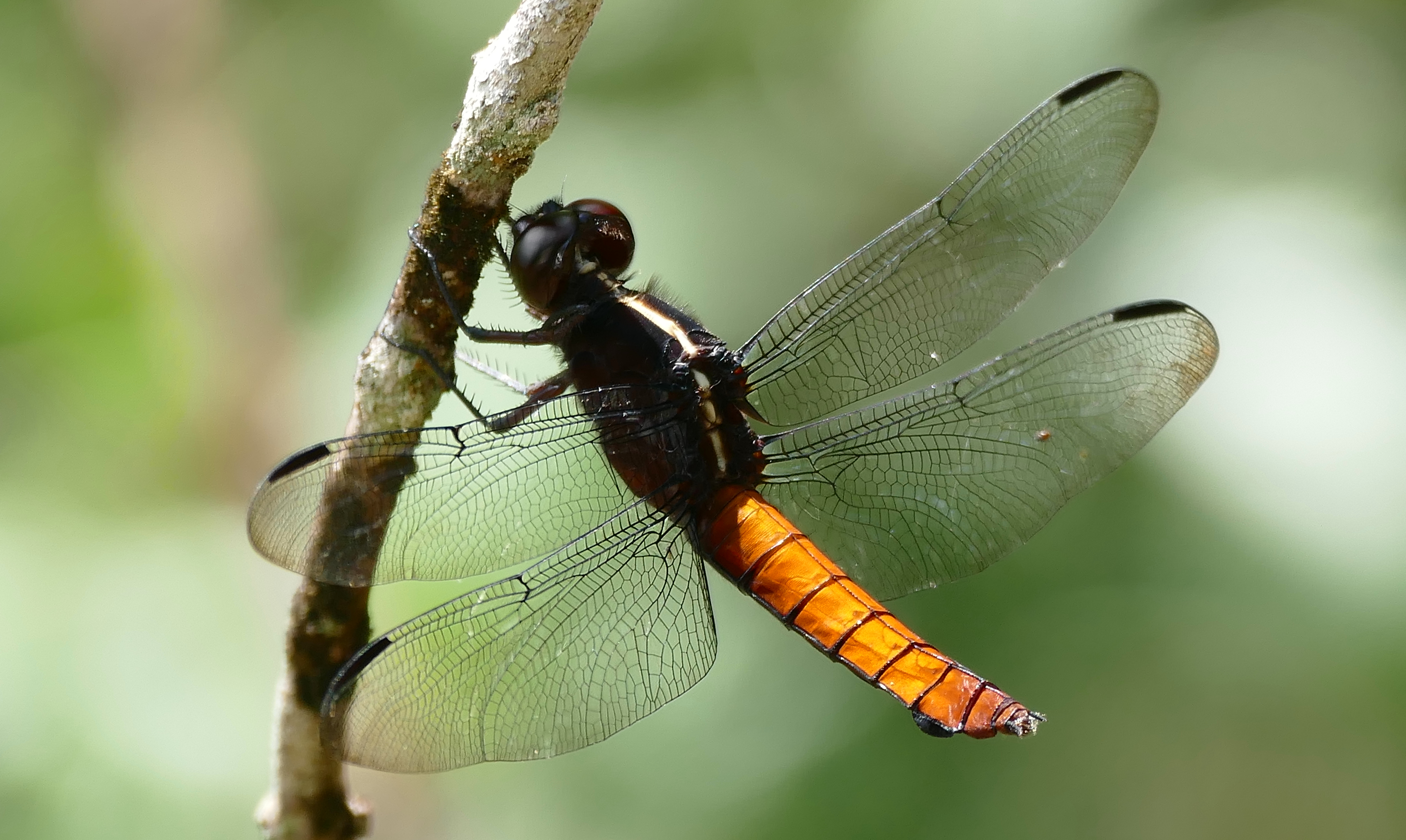
- female

Scientific classification
- Kingdom: Animalia
- Phylum: Arthropoda
- Clade: Pancrustacea
- Class: Insecta
- Order: Odonata
- Infraorder: Anisoptera
- Family: Libellulidae
- Genus: Libellula
- Species: L. herculea

Binomial name
- Libellula herculea (Karsch, 1889)

= Libellula herculea =

Species of dragonfly

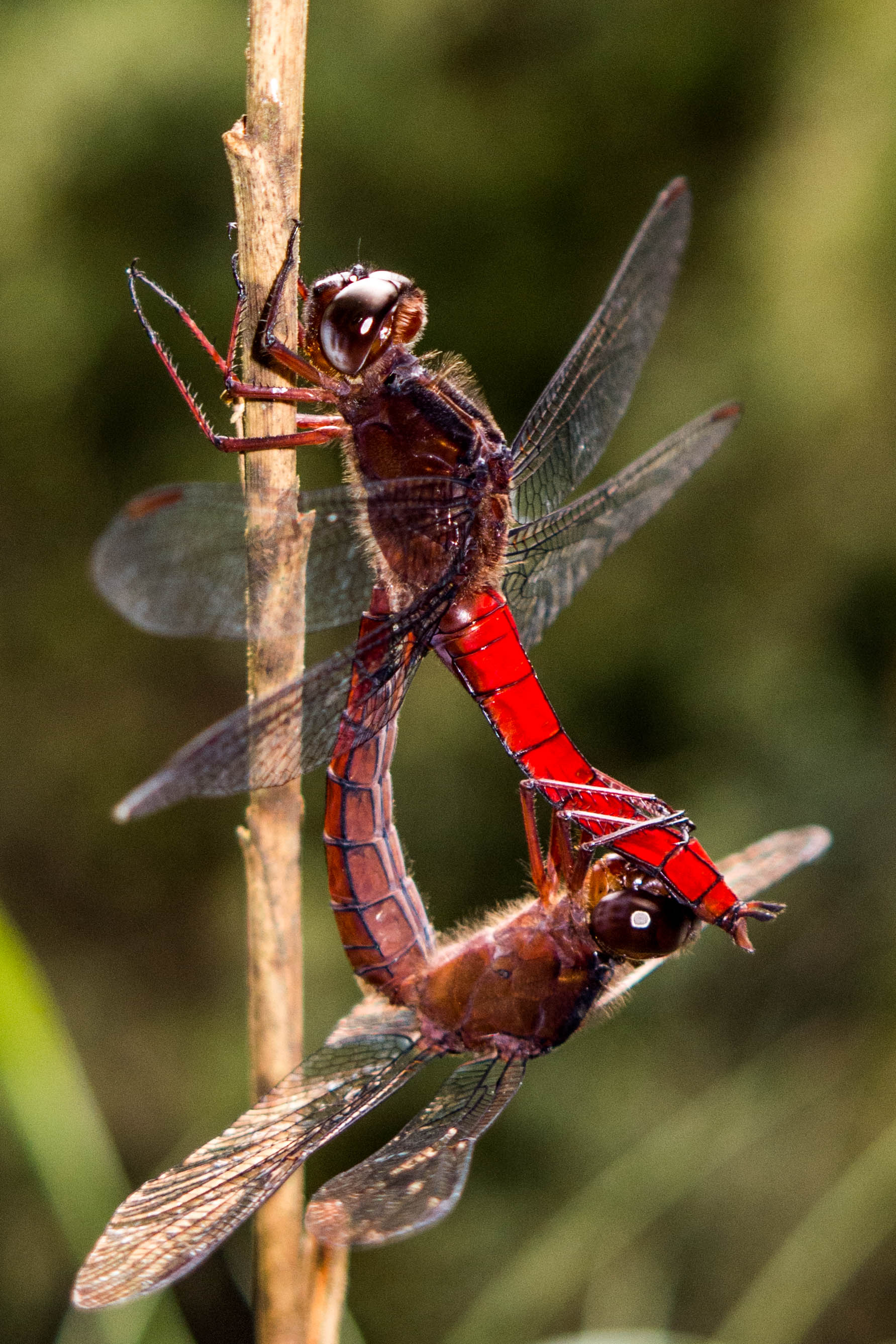
Copula between male and female

Libellula herculea is a species of Libellula found in Argentina, Bolivia, Brazil, Belize, Colombia, Costa Rica, Ecuador, French Guiana, Guatemala, Guyana, Honduras, Mexico, Nicaragua, Panama, Peru, Paraguay, El Salvador, and Venezuela
