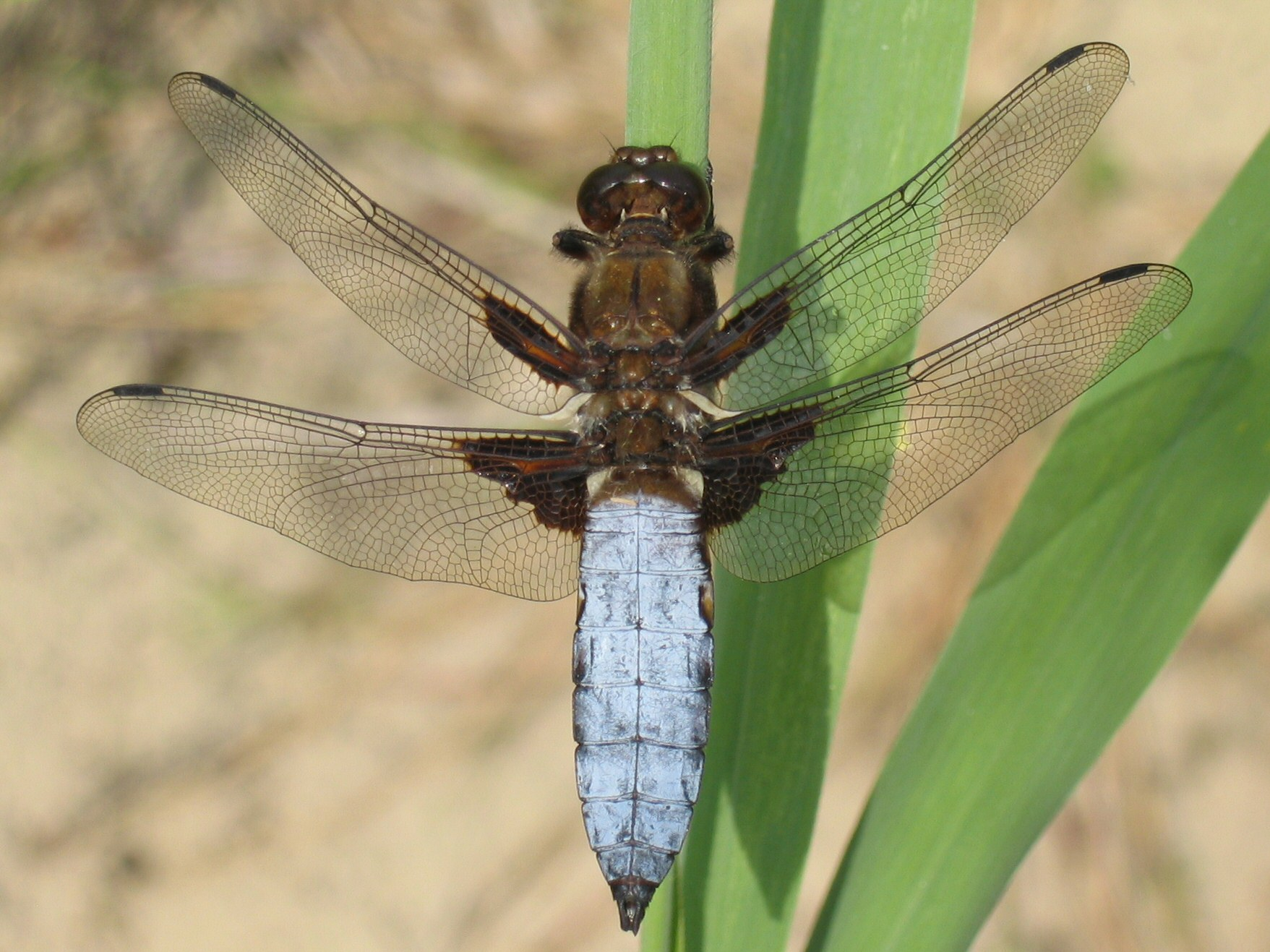
- Broad-bodied chaser (Libellula depressa)

Scientific classification
- Kingdom: Animalia
- Phylum: Arthropoda
- Clade: Pancrustacea
- Class: Insecta
- Order: Odonata
- Infraorder: Anisoptera
- Family: Libellulidae
- Subfamily: Libellulinae
- Genus: Libellula; Linnaeus, 1758

Type species
- Libellula depressa

Species
- See text

= Libellula =

Libellula Temporal range: Late Miocene–present

Genus of dragonflies

Libellula is a genus of dragonflies, called chasers (in British English) or skimmers (in American English), in the family Libellulidae. They are distributed throughout the temperate zone of the Northern Hemisphere. Many have showy wing patterns and bright bodies.

== Identification ==
These are medium to large dragonflies, 34–63 mm (1.3–2.5 in) in length. The faces of these dragonflies can be white, yellow, red, brown, or black. Their bodies can be light yellow, orange, red, or brown, and the males often have a glaucous or pruinose coating when mature. Wings in the genus Libellula often have yellow, orange, or brown patterns, or they can be completely clear.

Unique characteristics belonging only to the genus Libellula are not well defined. Many species or individual dragonflies have variations of these identifying traits. However, four synapomorphies are described, with two of them referring to the wing venation. The other two identifying features of the genus Libellula are a characteristic brown area at the base of the forewing and a wide abdomen.

== Distribution and habitat ==
Libellula dragonflies are generally distributed in the Northern Hemisphere. A few species are endemic to Europe and Asia, but much of the diversity of this genus in North America. L. herculea is the only species with an extensive distribution in South America.

Adult Libellula are commonly found near bodies of water, perching or landing on reeds and branches. Larvae of the genus live exclusively in water, particularly in the muddy bottoms of still or slow-moving water bodies. Some species, like L. pulchella, can live in drinking tanks of well-water for cattle, along with their natural habitat of ponds and marshes.

Of the 28 species in the genus, five are currently listed on the IUCN Red List as threatened with extinction. L. angelina is listed as critically endangered, L. coahuiltecana is endangered, and L. jesseana is vulnerable. The other two species, L. mariae and L. pontica, are listed as near threatened.

== Biology ==
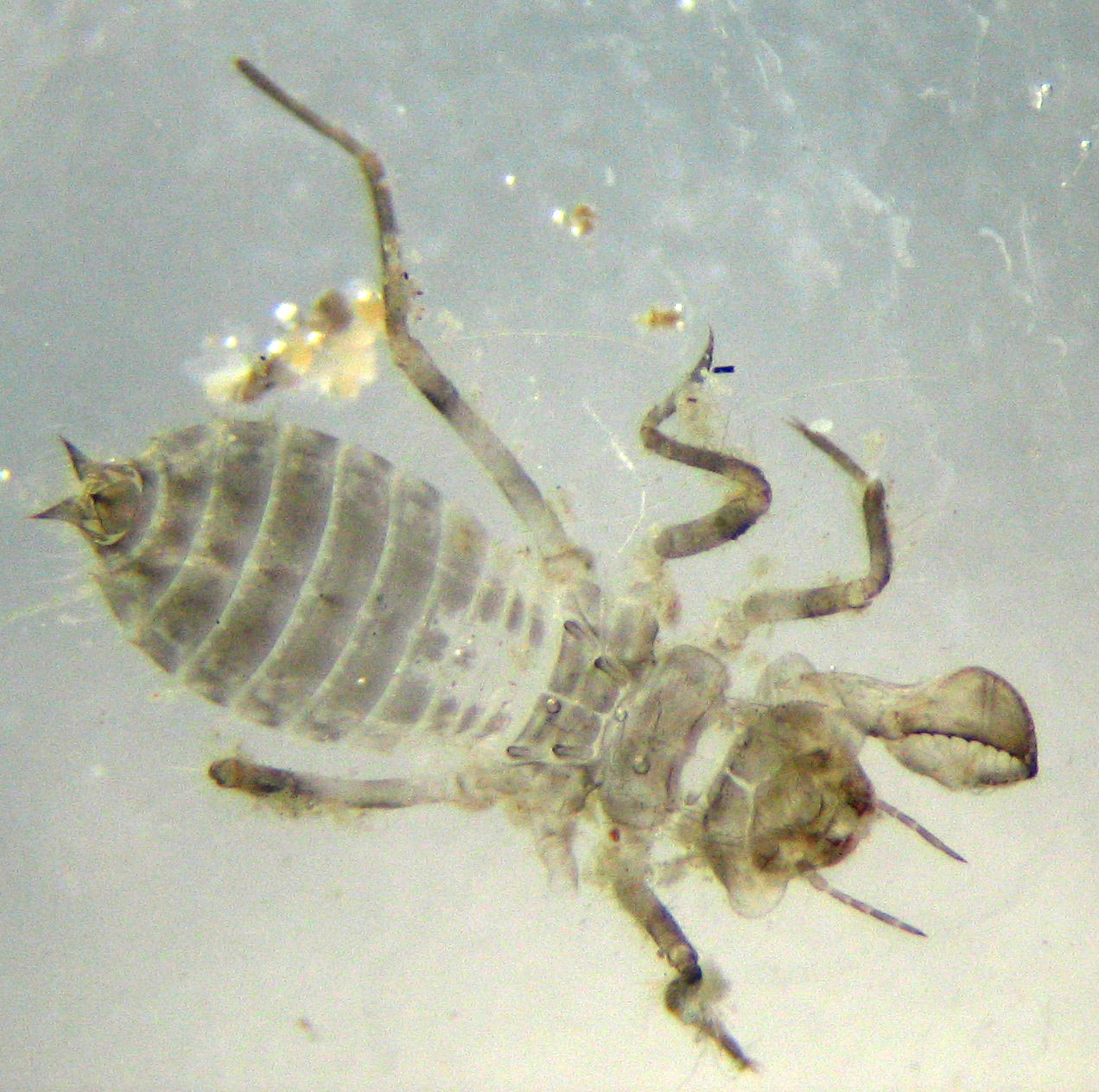
The shed exoskeleton of a Libellula nymph. The well-developed jaw used to catch prey can be seen to the left of the rest of the head.

Eggs are laid by adult females directly into water bodies, which will hatch into aquatic nymphs. Libellula nymphs can compete for resources with other nymphs in their genus in a shared habitat. These nymphs will also show cannibalism on each other in high densities, and dragonflies are often the top predator in fishless water bodies. Species within Libellula are efficient predators, using mechanical and visual cues to release their developed labium and labial palpi to catch their prey.

Adult males in the genus Libellula can be territorial and aggressive. The territories they defend are ideal breeding sites, which are in sunlight and lacking surface vegetation. They fly around their territory and attack other male dragonflies to eliminate mating competition. The males are likely territorial due to the sex-ratio being biased towards males, meaning that there are more males than females.

== Etymology ==
The genus name comes from Latin libella, meaning "a carpenter's level", because of the insect's ability to stay level when hovering.

== Taxonomy ==
The type species is Libellula depressa Linnaeus, 1758, designated by William Forsell Kirby in 1889. Some subsequent authors have cited Libellula quadrimaculata as the type, but this contravenes the principle of priority.

The taxa Ladona (corporals) and Plathemis (whitetails) have been considered as synonyms of Libellula, subgenera, or separate genera by different authorities. Some phylogenetic analysis using 16S rRNA sequence data and insect morphology has supported their status as subgenera of Libellula rather than independent genera; however, As of April 2025 the World Odonata List retains these as distinct genera.

== Species ==
List of the 28 species accepted by the World Odonata List:

=== Extant species ===
Male	Female	Scientific name	Common name	Distribution
		Libellula angelina Selys, 1883	bekko tombo	North China, Japan
		Libellula auripennis Burmeister, 1839	golden-winged skimmer	North and Central America
		Libellula axilena Westwood, 1837	bar-winged skimmer	North America
		Libellula coahuiltecana Ortega-Salas & González-Soriano, 2015	Coahuila Skimmer	Mexico (Coahuila)
		Libellula comanche Calvert, 1907	Comanche skimmer	Central America and North America
		Libellula composita (Hagen, 1873)	bleached skimmer	North America
		Libellula croceipennis Selys, 1869	neon skimmer	North and Central America
		Libellula cyanea Fabricius, 1775	spangled skimmer	United States of America
		Libellula depressa Linnaeus, 1758	broad-bodied chaser	Europe, West Asia
		Libellula flavida Rambur, 1842	yellow-sided skimmer	North America
		Libellula foliata (Kirby, 1889)		Mexico (Chiapas)
		Libellula forensis Hagen, 1861	eight-spotted skimmer	Western United States and Canada
		Libellula fulva Müller, 1764	scarce chaser	Europe
		Libellula gaigei Gloyd, 1938	Red-mantled Skimmer	Mexico, United States (Texas)
		Libellula herculea Karsch, 1889	Hercules Skimmer	Argentina, Bolivia, Brazil, Belize, Colombia, Costa Rica, Ecuador, French Guiana, Guatemala, Guyana, Honduras, Mexico, Nicaragua, Panama, Peru, Paraguay, El Salvador, and Venezuela
		Libellula incesta Hagen, 1861	slaty skimmer	eastern United States and southern Ontario, Quebec, and New Brunswick
		Libellula jesseana Williamson, 1922	purple skimmer	United States (Florida)
		Libellula luctuosa Burmeister, 1839	widow skimmer	United States, Canada (southern Ontario and Quebec)
		Libellula mariae Garrison, 1992	Maria's Skimmer	Costa Rica
		Libellula melli Schmidt, 1948		China
		Libellula needhami Westfall, 1943	Needham's skimmer	Caribbean, Central America, and North America
		Libellula nodisticta Hagen, 1861	hoary skimmer	Central America, North America, and South America
		Libellula pontica Selys, 1887	red chaser	Armenia, Iran, Iraq, Israel, Jordan, Kyrgyzstan, Syria, Turkey
		Libellula pulchella Drury, 1773	twelve-spotted skimmer	southern Canada and contiguous United States states
		Libellula quadrimaculata Linnaeus, 1758	four-spotted chaser or four-spotted skimmer	Europe and North America
		Libellula saturata Uhler, 1857	flame skimmer	Southwestern United States
		Libellula semifasciata Burmeister, 1839	painted skimmer	New Brunswick, Canada as far south as Texas and Florida
		Libellula vibrans Fabricius, 1793	great blue skimmer	eastern United States

== Fossils ==
- Libellula brodieri†
- Libellula calypso†
- Libellula doris †
- Libellula eusebioi†
- Libellula kieseli†
- Libellula martini†
- Libellula melobasis†
- Libellula pannewitziana†
- Libellula perse†
- Libellula sieboldiana†
- Libellula thetis†
- Libellula thoe†
- Libellula ukrainensis†
