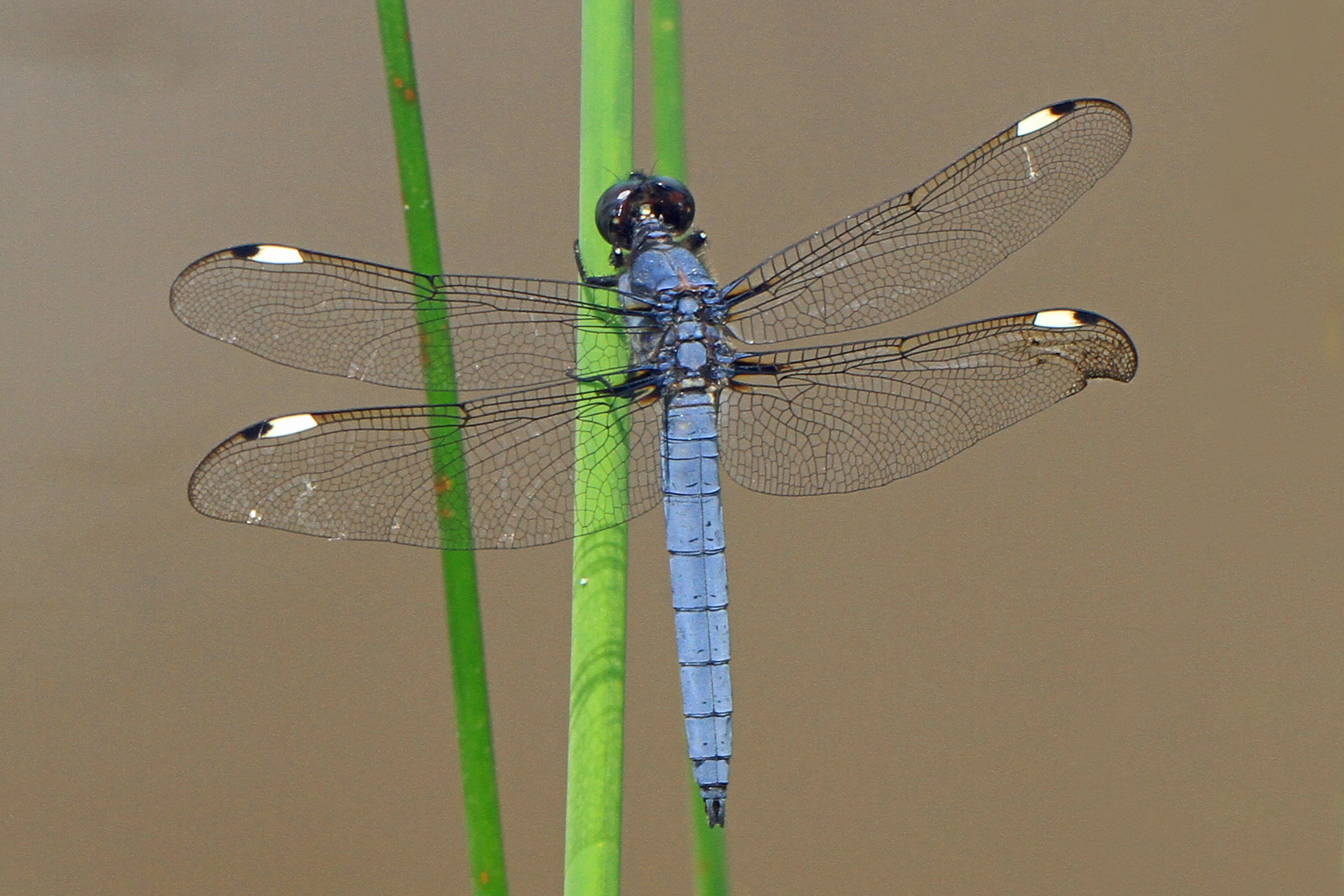
- male
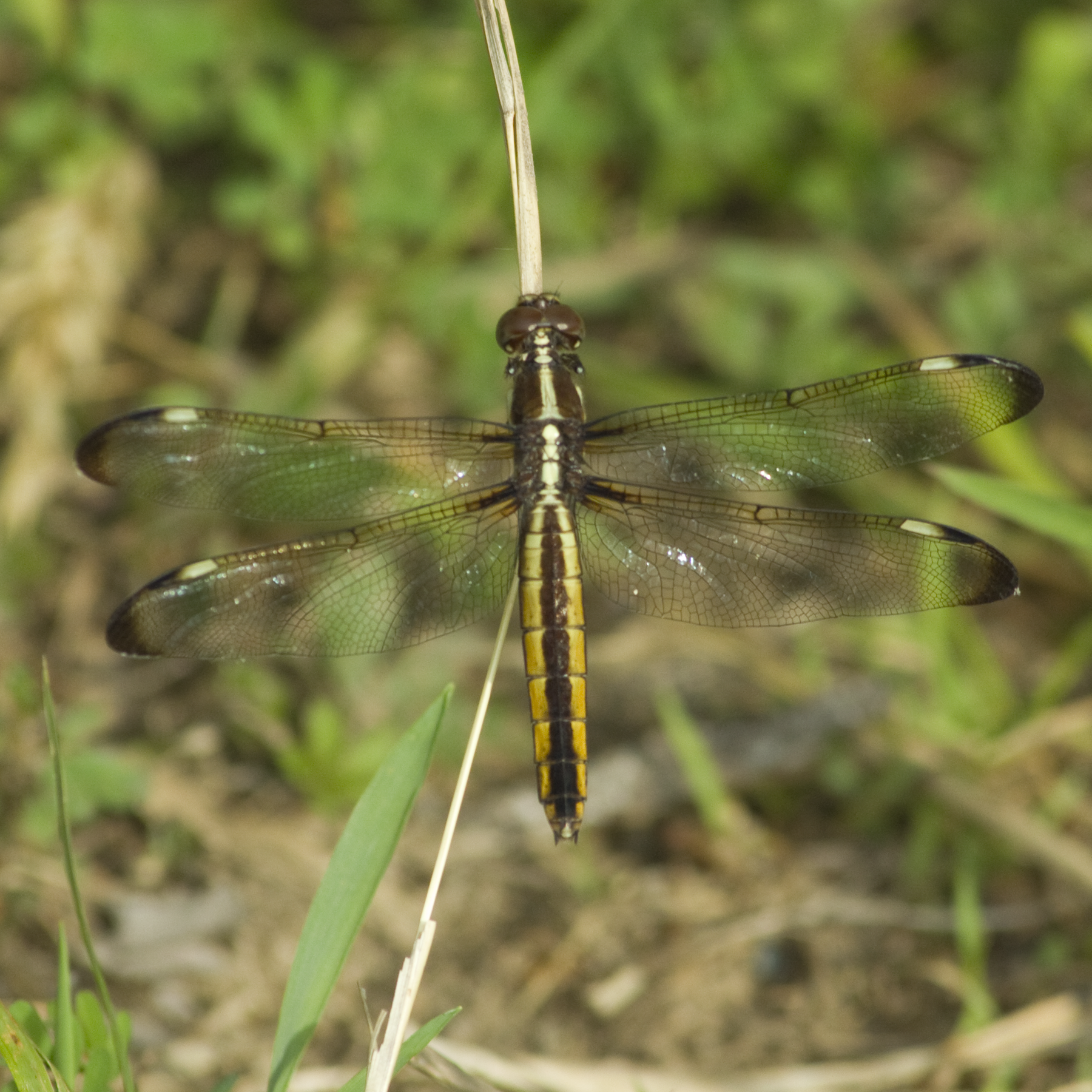
- female

Scientific classification
- Kingdom: Animalia
- Phylum: Arthropoda
- Clade: Pancrustacea
- Class: Insecta
- Order: Odonata
- Infraorder: Anisoptera
- Family: Libellulidae
- Genus: Libellula
- Species: L. cyanea

Binomial name
- Libellula cyanea Fabricius, 1775

= Libellula cyanea =

Spangled skimmer

Species of dragonfly

Libellula cyanea, the spangled skimmer, is a species of dragonfly in the genus Libellula, native to the United States of America. Males have a blue thorax and abdomen.

The females are brown with yellow stripes. They also have clear wings with brown wing tips.
