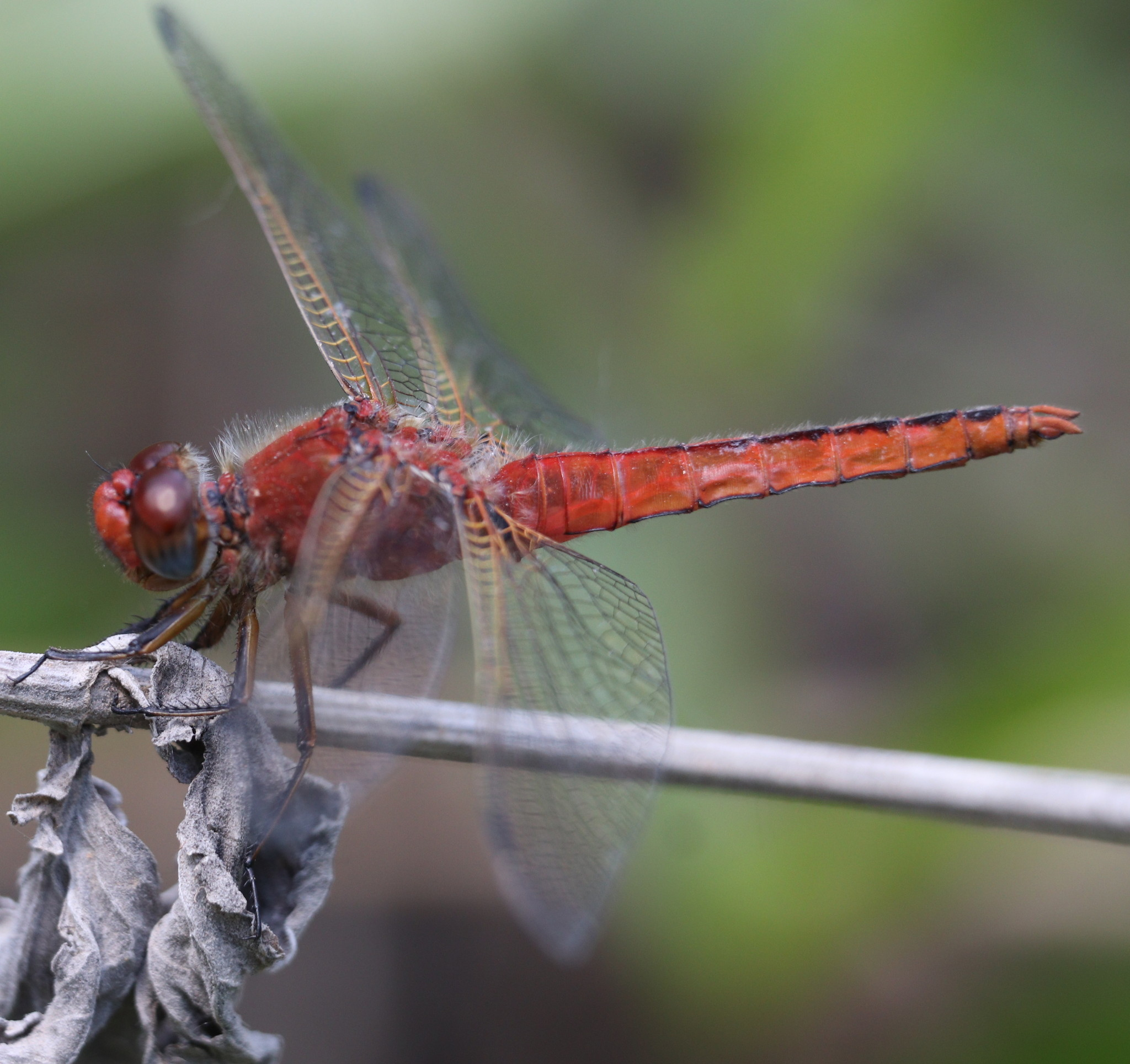
- Male in Turkey

Conservation status
- Near Threatened (IUCN 3.1)

Scientific classification
- Kingdom: Animalia
- Phylum: Arthropoda
- Clade: Pancrustacea
- Class: Insecta
- Order: Odonata
- Infraorder: Anisoptera
- Family: Libellulidae
- Genus: Libellula
- Species: L. pontica

Binomial name
- Libellula pontica Selys, 1887

= Libellula pontica =

Species of dragonfly

Libellula pontica is a species of dragonfly in the family Libellulidae. It is found in Armenia, Iran, Iraq, Israel, Jordan, Kyrgyzstan, Syria, and Turkey. Its natural habitats are swamps, freshwater marshes, ponds, and canals and ditches. It is threatened by habitat loss.

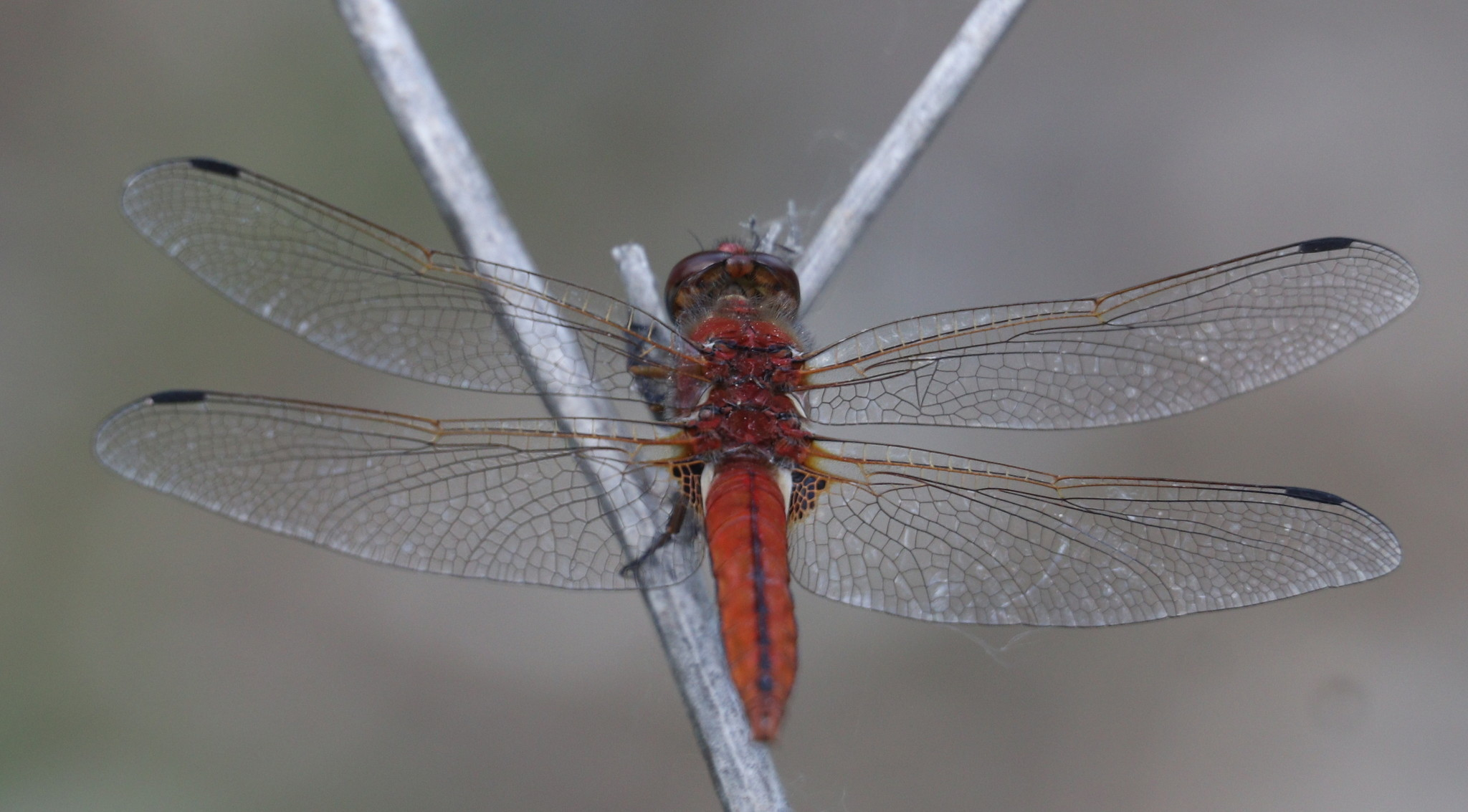
Male in Turkey
