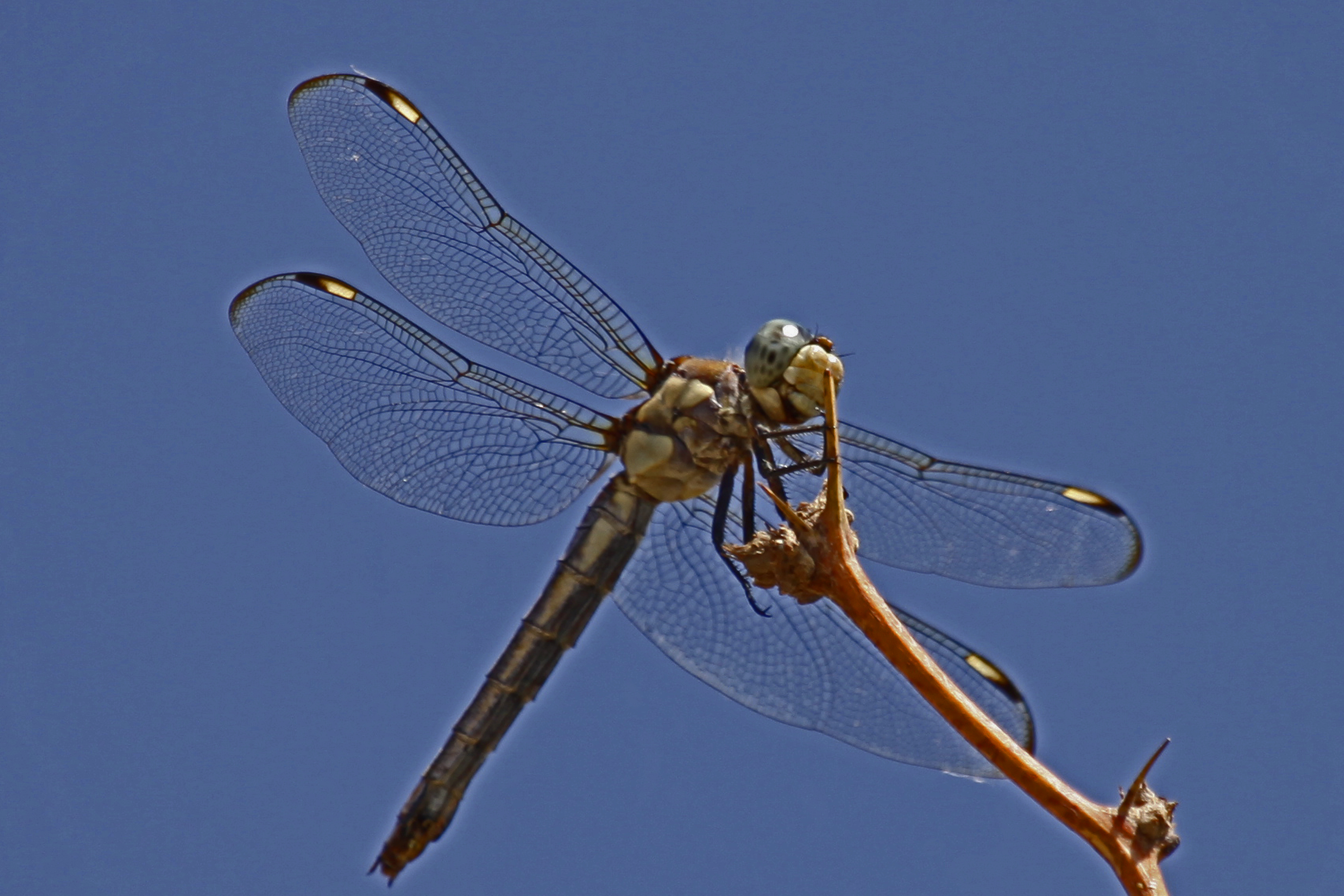

Conservation status
- Least Concern (IUCN 3.1)

Scientific classification
- Kingdom: Animalia
- Phylum: Arthropoda
- Clade: Pancrustacea
- Class: Insecta
- Order: Odonata
- Infraorder: Anisoptera
- Family: Libellulidae
- Genus: Libellula
- Species: L. comanche

Binomial name
- Libellula comanche Calvert, 1907

= Libellula comanche =

Species of dragonfly

Libellula comanche, the Comanche skimmer, is a species of skimmer in the family Libellulidae. It is found in Central America and North America.

The IUCN conservation status of Libellula comanche is "LC", least concern, with no immediate threat to the species' survival. The population is stable.
