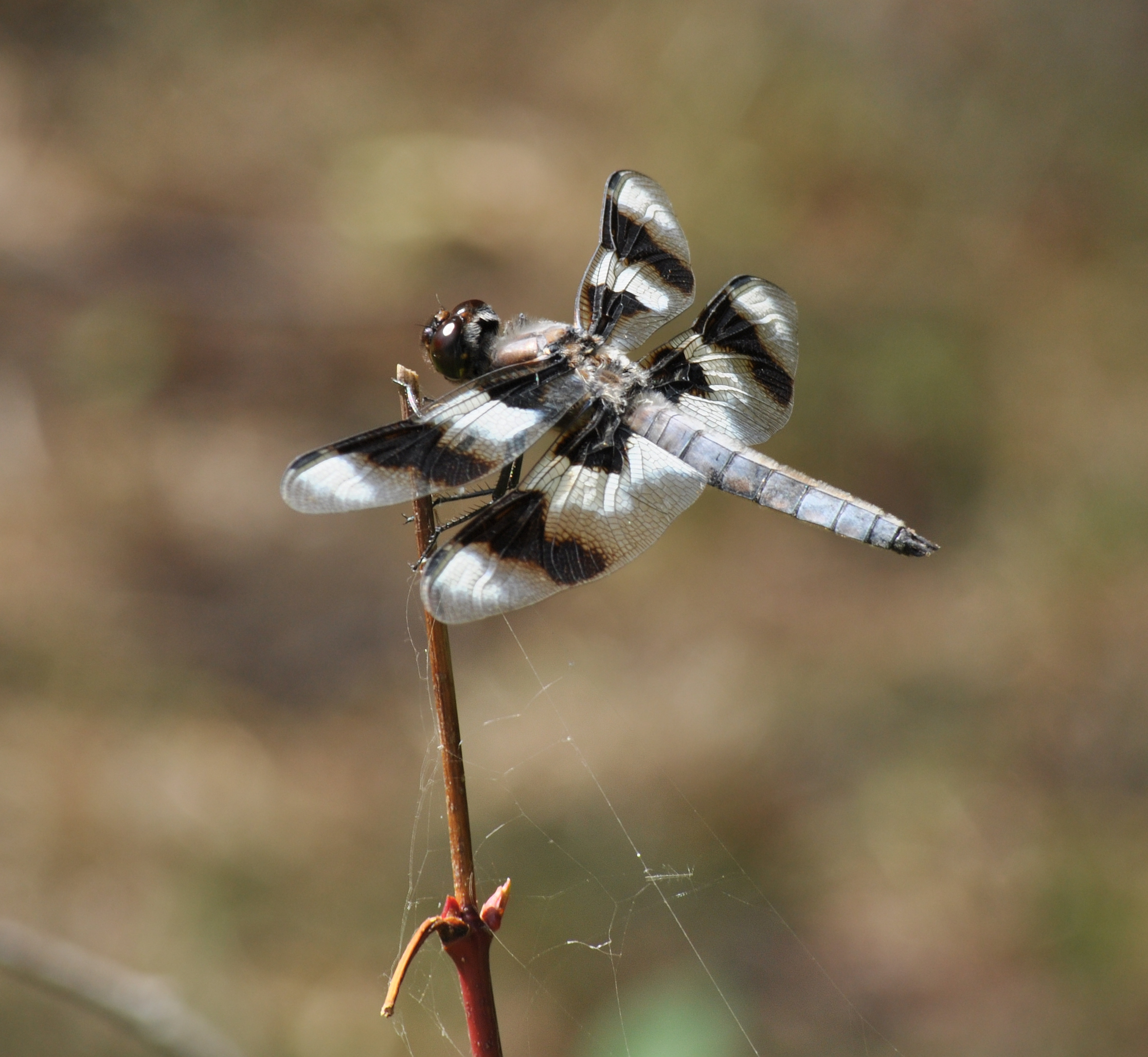

Conservation status
- Least Concern (IUCN 3.1)

Scientific classification
- Kingdom: Animalia
- Phylum: Arthropoda
- Clade: Pancrustacea
- Class: Insecta
- Order: Odonata
- Infraorder: Anisoptera
- Family: Libellulidae
- Genus: Libellula
- Species: L. forensis

Binomial name
- Libellula forensis Hagen, 1861
- Range of L. forensis

= Eight-spotted skimmer =

Species of dragonfly

The eight-spotted skimmer (Libellula forensis) is a dragonfly of the skimmer family.

== Description ==
This dragonfly features the standard skimmer body form, and earns its name from the eight black markings on the wings. It is similar to the twelve-spotted skimmer, but lacks the black markings on the wing tips of that species. Males are additionally adorned with a total of eight opaque white spots. It can be found west of the Rocky Mountains near muddy bottomed ponds and lakes. East of the Sierra Nevada Mountains, some females may also have white spots, making them the only female dragonflies in North America with white spots on the wings. The total length is 44 to 50 mm. Flight season is April through October.
