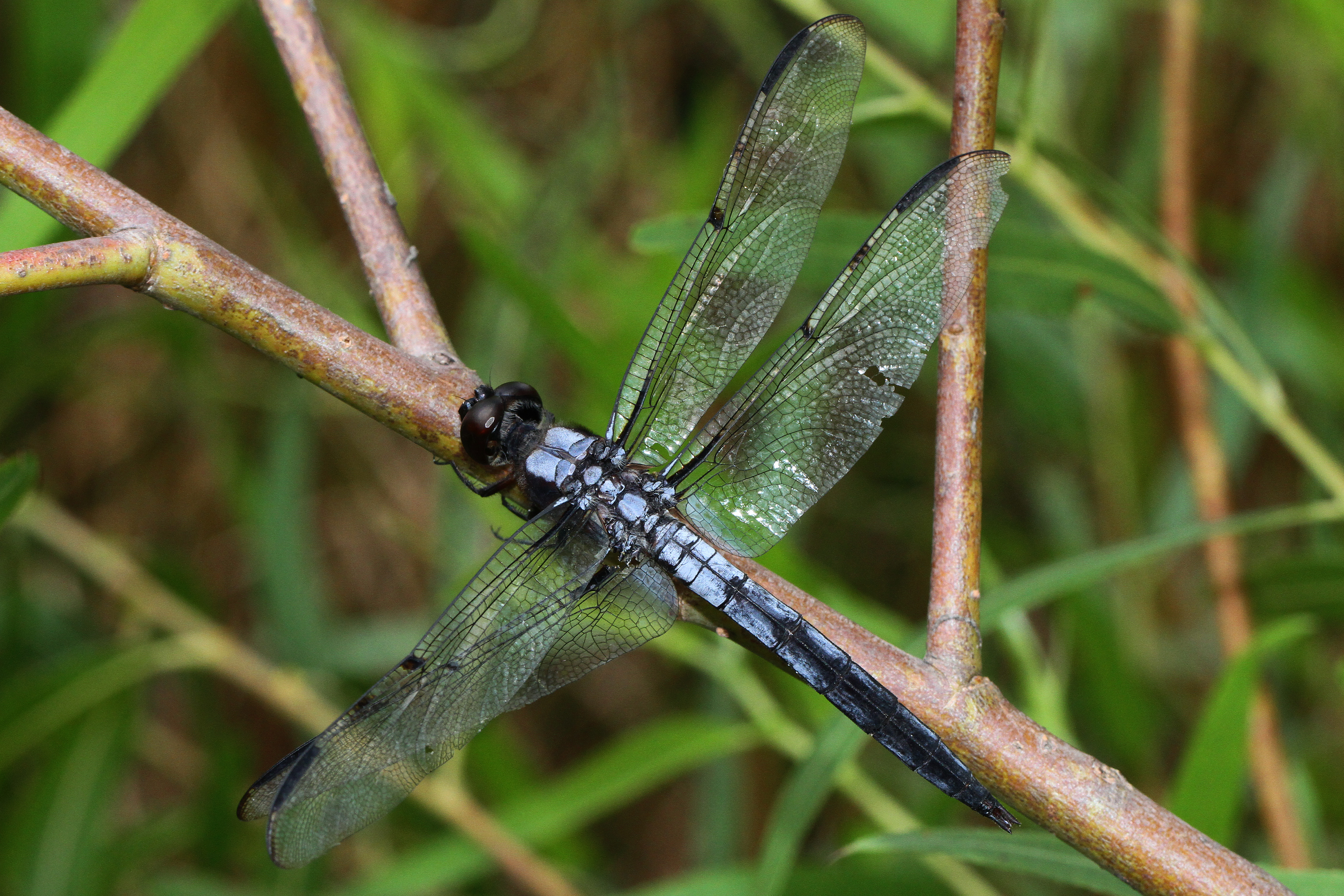

Conservation status
- Least Concern (IUCN 3.1)

Scientific classification
- Kingdom: Animalia
- Phylum: Arthropoda
- Clade: Pancrustacea
- Class: Insecta
- Order: Odonata
- Infraorder: Anisoptera
- Family: Libellulidae
- Genus: Libellula
- Species: L. axilena

Binomial name
- Libellula axilena Westwood, 1837

= Libellula axilena =

Species of dragonfly

Libellula axilena, the bar-winged skimmer, is a species of skimmer in the dragonfly family Libellulidae. It is found in North America.

The IUCN conservation status of Libellula axilena is "LC", least concern, with no immediate threat to the species' survival. The population is stable. The IUCN status was reviewed in 2017.

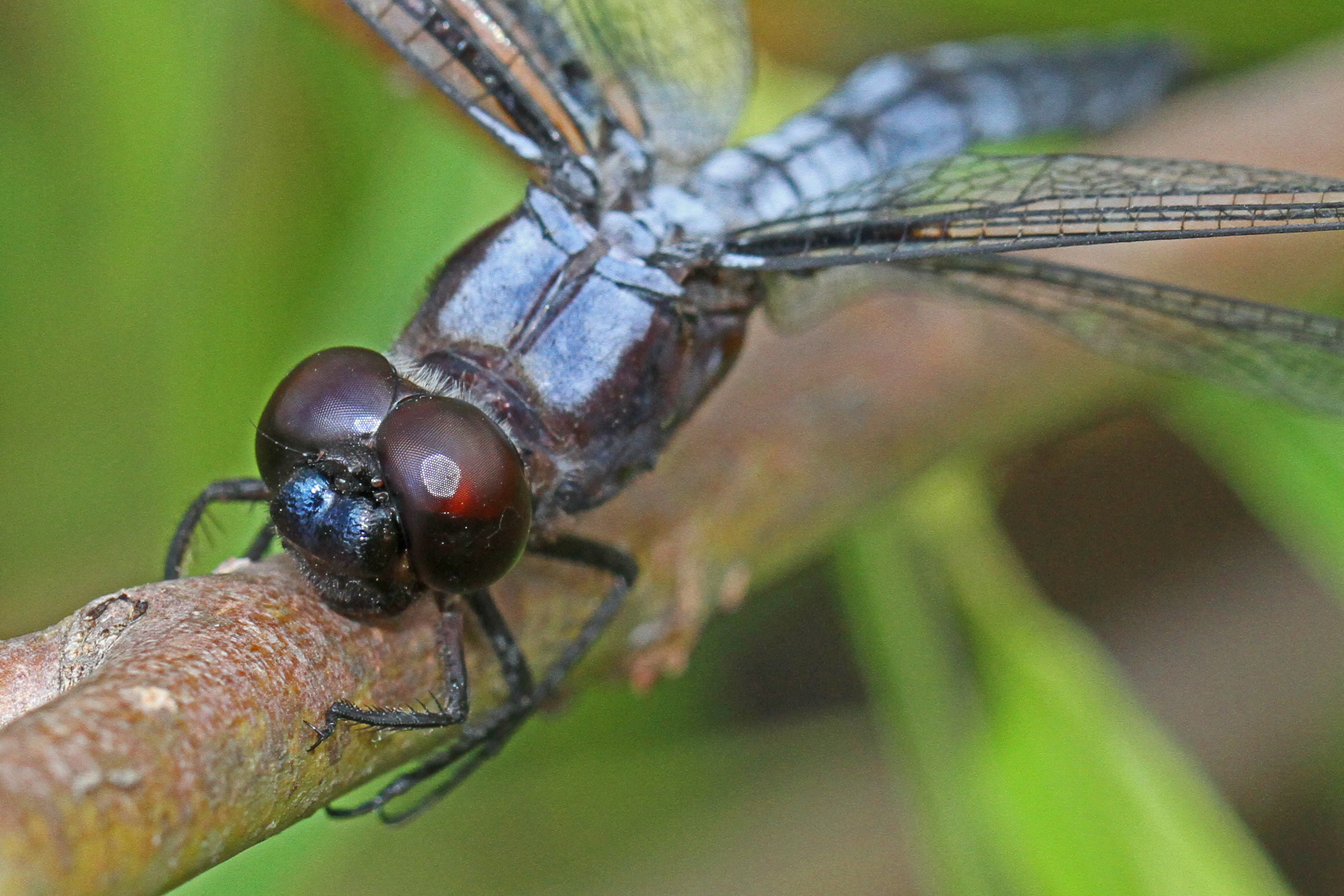
Bar-winged skimmer, Libellula axilena

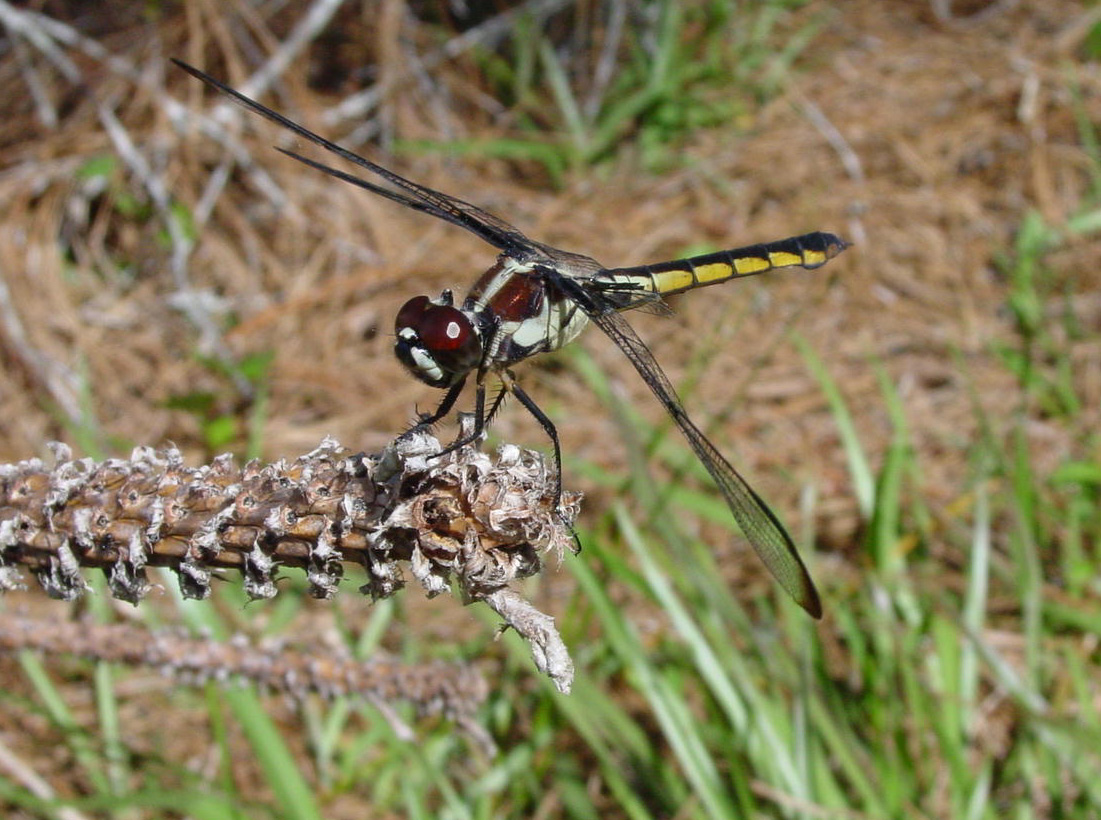
Bar-winged skimmer, Libellula axilena
