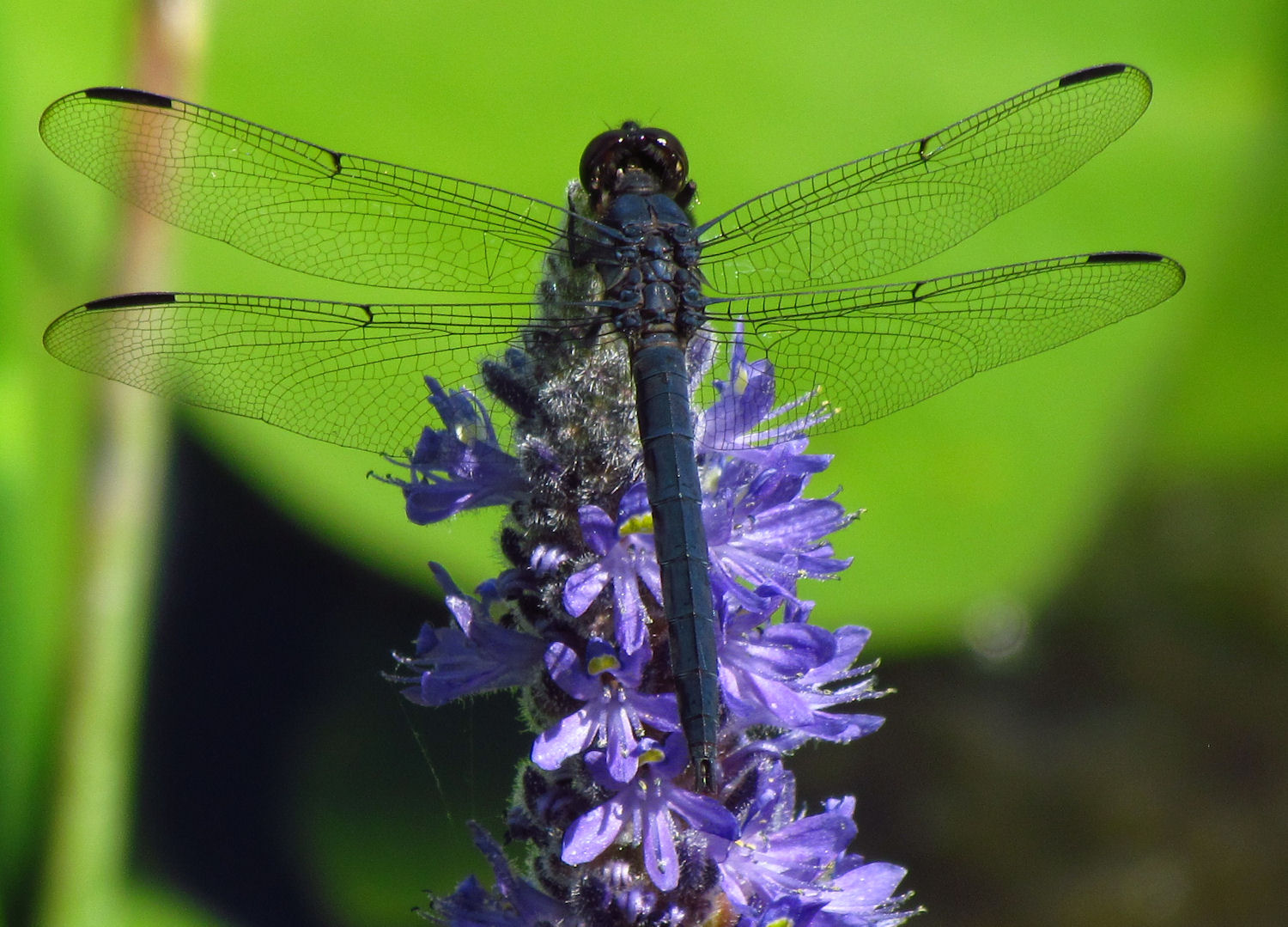
- Male
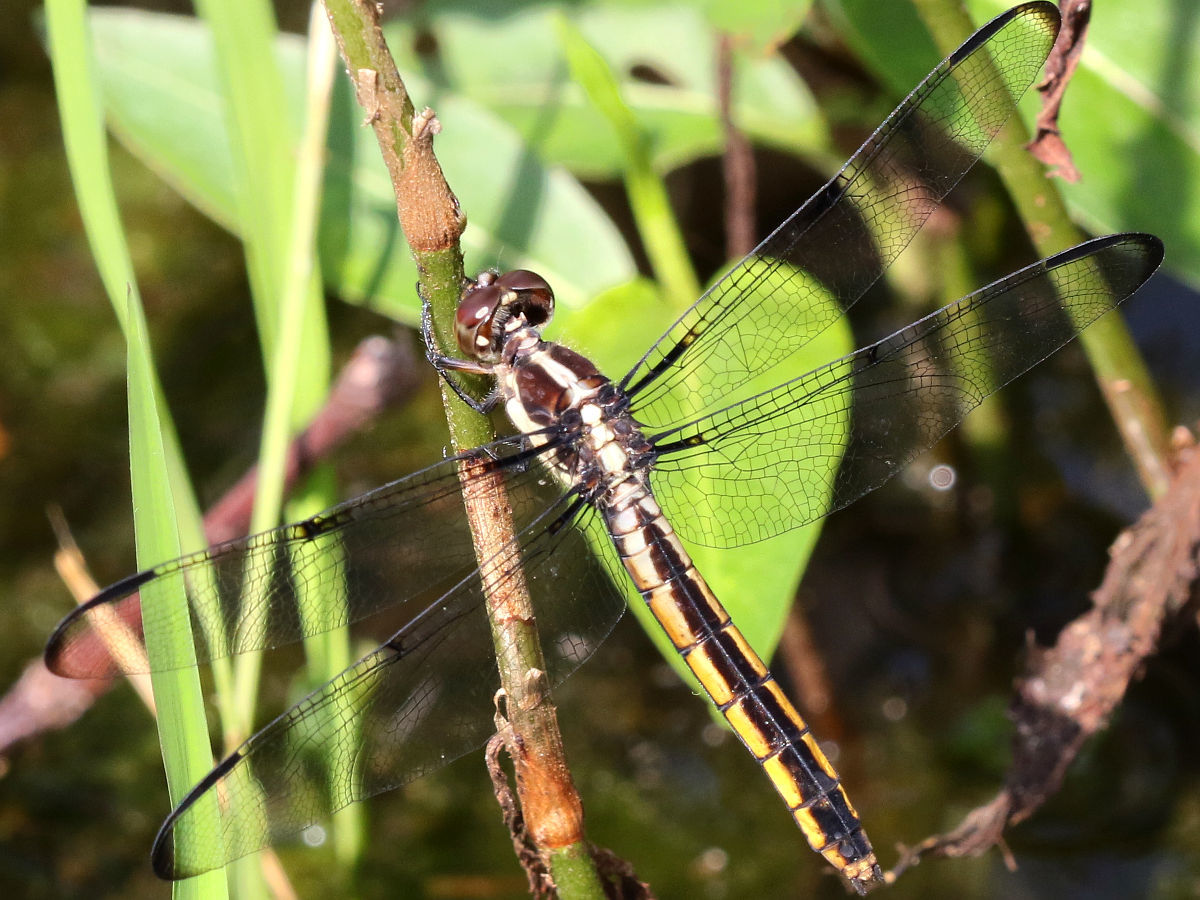
- Female

Scientific classification
- Kingdom: Animalia
- Phylum: Arthropoda
- Clade: Pancrustacea
- Class: Insecta
- Order: Odonata
- Infraorder: Anisoptera
- Family: Libellulidae
- Genus: Libellula
- Species: L. incesta

Binomial name
- Libellula incesta Hagen, 1861

= Libellula incesta =

Species of dragonfly

Libellula incesta, the slaty skimmer, is a dragonfly of the skimmer family, native to eastern United States and southern Ontario, Quebec, and New Brunswick. Adults are 5.28 cm (2.08 in) long. Mature males are dark blue with black heads. Females and juveniles have brown abdomens with a darker stripe down their backs. Adults fly from June to August. Larvae are habitat specialists, found in the benthos of permanent lakes.
