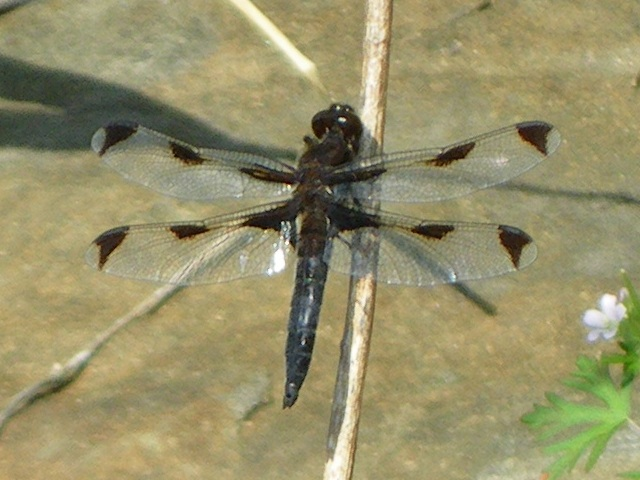

Conservation status
- Critically Endangered (IUCN 3.1)

Scientific classification
- Kingdom: Animalia
- Phylum: Arthropoda
- Clade: Pancrustacea
- Class: Insecta
- Order: Odonata
- Infraorder: Anisoptera
- Family: Libellulidae
- Genus: Libellula
- Species: L. angelina

Binomial name
- Libellula angelina Selys, 1883

= Libellula angelina =

Bekko Tombo

Species of dragonfly

Libellula angelina, also known as bekko tombo, is a species of dragonfly in the family Libellulidae, native to China and Japan. It is under threat by rapid loss of the ponds and other small water bodies it uses as habitat, and is currently classified as critically endangered by the IUCN.

== Description ==
The bekko tombo is a golden to rusty-brown dragonfly, with a dark stripe down the centre of the abdomen and a distinctive pattern of dark markings on its wings. Like other members of the family Libellulidae, this dragonfly has a relatively short, broad abdomen, and its body is distinctly shorter than its wingspan.

== Distribution and habitat ==
The bekko tombo occurs in central and northern China, Japan (Honshu, Shikoku, Kyushu and offshore islands) and Korea. It inhabits old and stable ponds with moderate plant growth in lowland hill areas. It requires clear, open water in which the nymphs crawl around in the bottom sediments.

== Ecology ==
The bekko tombo is univoltine. It has a larval period of one year. Eggs hatch from May to June, and adults emerge the following spring. There is often fierce competition between males for access to reproductive females. Females typically begin to lay eggs in water immediately after copulation, often guarded by their mate. However, females of some species can store live sperm in their body for a number of days.

== Threats and conservation ==
The bekko tombo has experienced drastic declines in recent decades, mostly driven by the continuing disappearance of its required breeding habitats, old and stable ponds with vegetated borders. Introduced predators such as the largemouth bass (Micropterus salmoides) have also had an impact. The species has been protected in Japan since 1993, and efforts by various NGOs are ongoing to preserve and reconstitute suitable breeding habitats. Current population is estimated at less than 5,000 individuals, and the species has been classified as critically endangered by the IUCN.
