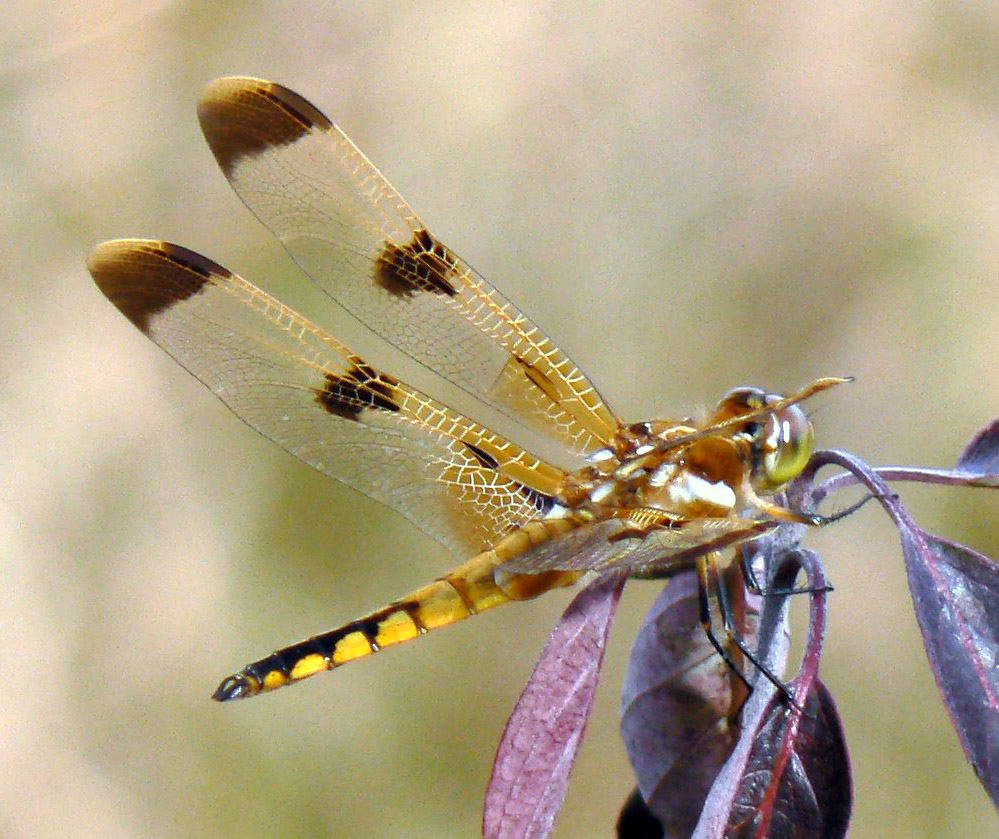

Conservation status
- Least Concern (IUCN 3.1)

Scientific classification
- Kingdom: Animalia
- Phylum: Arthropoda
- Clade: Pancrustacea
- Class: Insecta
- Order: Odonata
- Infraorder: Anisoptera
- Family: Libellulidae
- Genus: Libellula
- Species: L. semifasciata

Binomial name
- Libellula semifasciata Burmeister, 1839

= Libellula semifasciata =

Species of dragonfly

Libellula semifasciata, the painted skimmer, is an uncommon eastern North American skimmer dragonfly, found from New Brunswick, Canada as far south as Texas and Florida.

It is a medium-sized species, at 43 mm (1.7 in) long. Each wing is amber coloured at the base and wing tip and has several brown spots. The abdomen has a lateral strip that is white anteriorly and yellow posteriorly.
