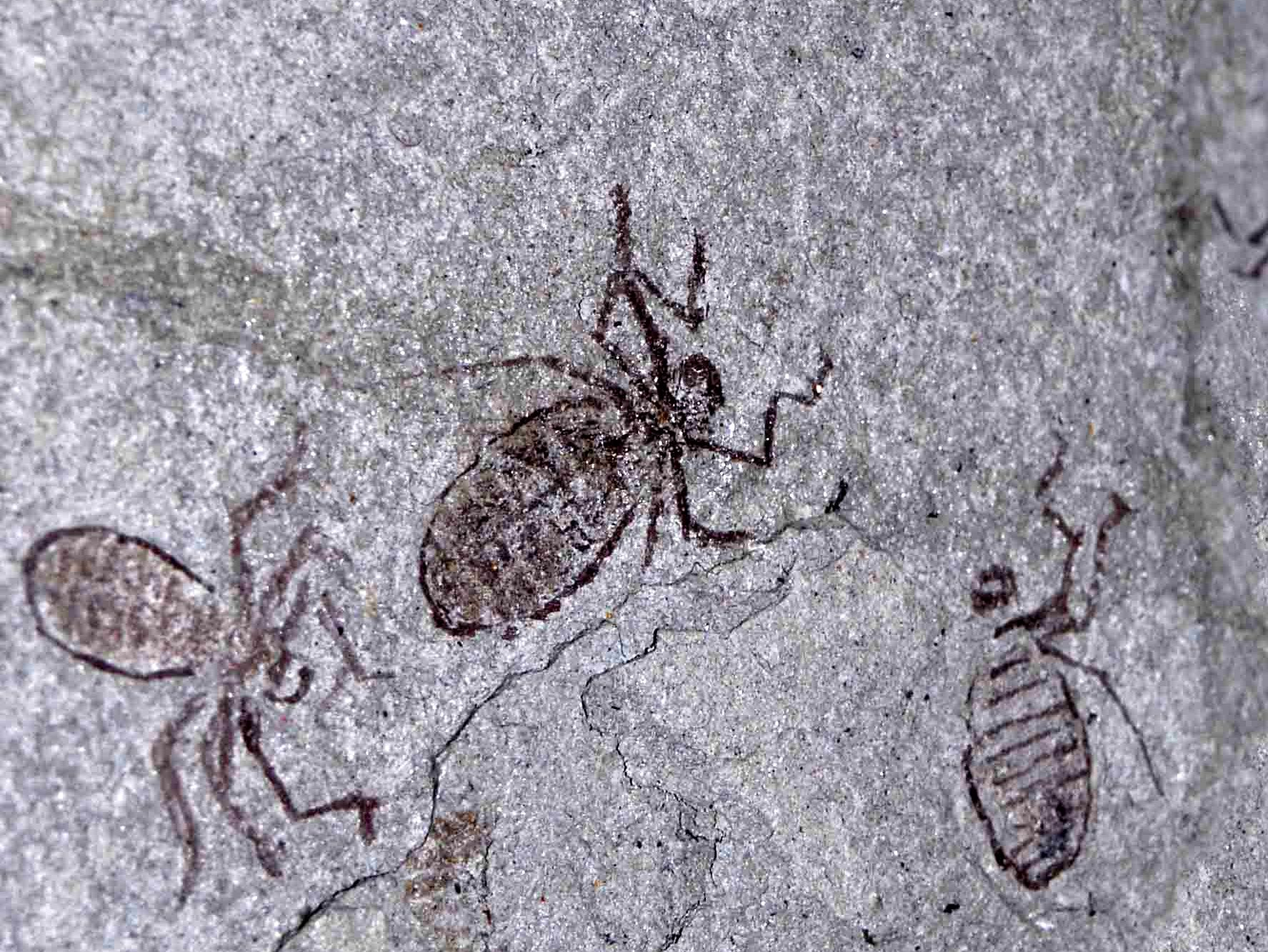
- Fossil larvae of Libellula doris from France

Scientific classification
- Kingdom: Animalia
- Phylum: Arthropoda
- Clade: Pancrustacea
- Class: Insecta
- Order: Odonata
- Infraorder: Anisoptera
- Family: Libellulidae
- Genus: Libellula
- Species: †L. doris

Binomial name
- †Libellula doris Heer 1849

= Libellula doris =

Libellula doris Temporal range: Miocene, 12.7–5.332 Ma

Extinct species of dragonfly

Libellula doris is an extinct species of dragonfly in the family Libellulidae. Larvae of these insects have been found in the Miocene of Germany, France and Italy.
