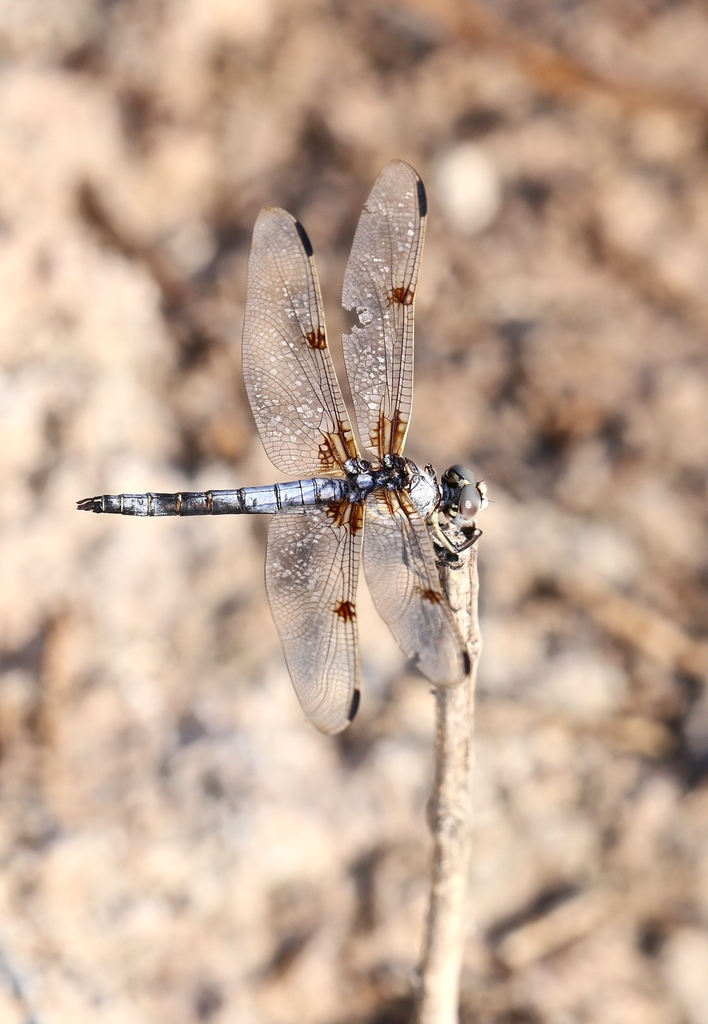

Conservation status
- Least Concern (IUCN 3.1)

Scientific classification
- Kingdom: Animalia
- Phylum: Arthropoda
- Clade: Pancrustacea
- Class: Insecta
- Order: Odonata
- Infraorder: Anisoptera
- Family: Libellulidae
- Genus: Libellula
- Species: L. composita

Binomial name
- Libellula composita (Hagen, 1873)

= Libellula composita =

Species of dragonfly

Libellula composita, the bleached skimmer, is a species of skimmer in the dragonfly family Libellulidae. It is found in North America.

The IUCN conservation status of Libellula composita is "LC", least concern, with no immediate threat to the species' survival. The population is stable. The IUCN status was reviewed in 2017.
