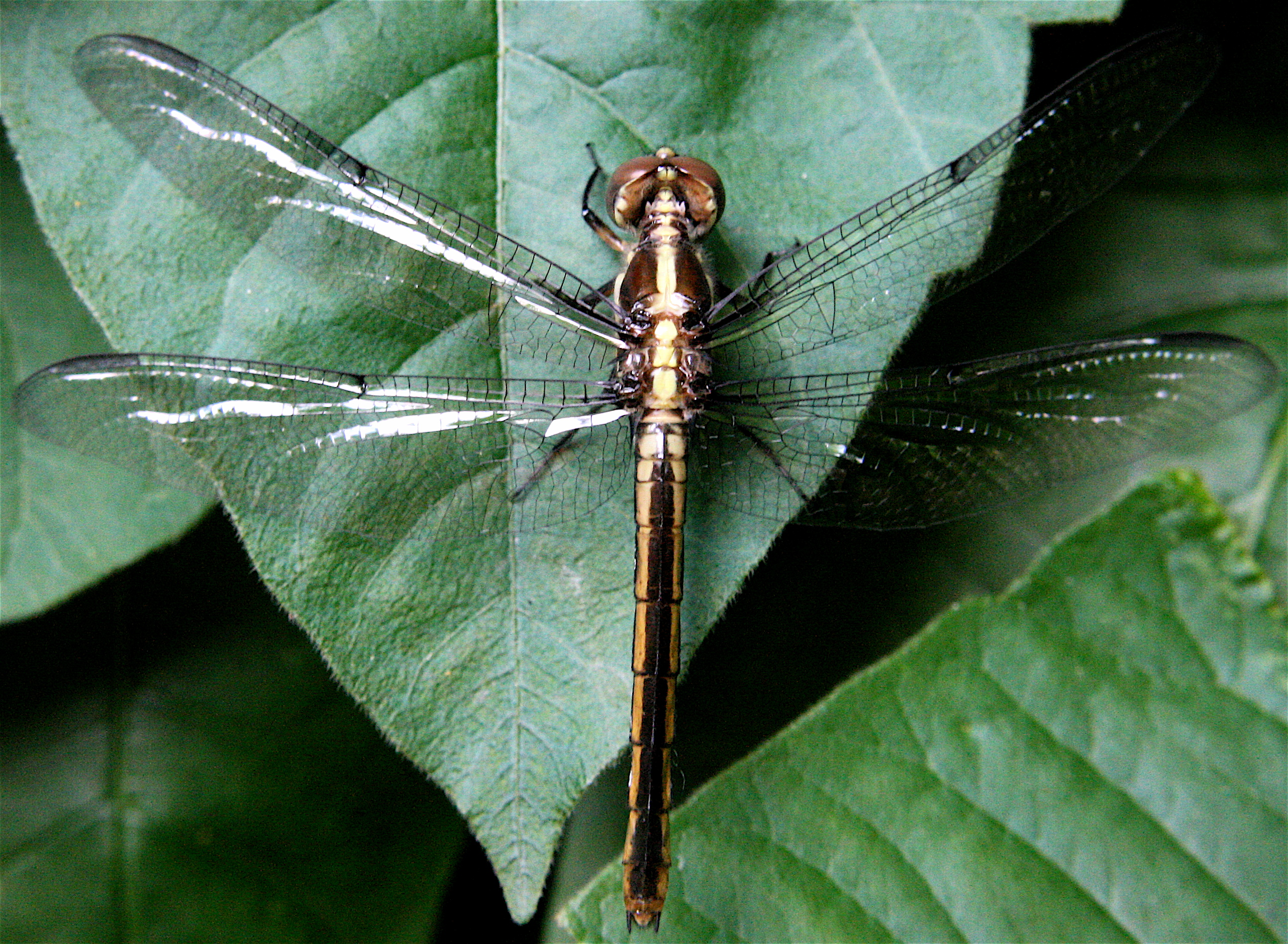

Conservation status
- Least Concern (IUCN 3.1)

Scientific classification
- Kingdom: Animalia
- Phylum: Arthropoda
- Clade: Pancrustacea
- Class: Insecta
- Order: Odonata
- Infraorder: Anisoptera
- Family: Libellulidae
- Genus: Libellula
- Species: L. flavida

Binomial name
- Libellula flavida Rambur, 1842

= Libellula flavida =

Species of dragonfly

Libellula flavida, the yellow-sided skimmer, is a species of skimmer in the family of dragonflies known as Libellulidae. It is found in North America.

The IUCN conservation status of Libellula flavida is "LC", least concern, with no immediate threat to the species' survival. The population is stable.

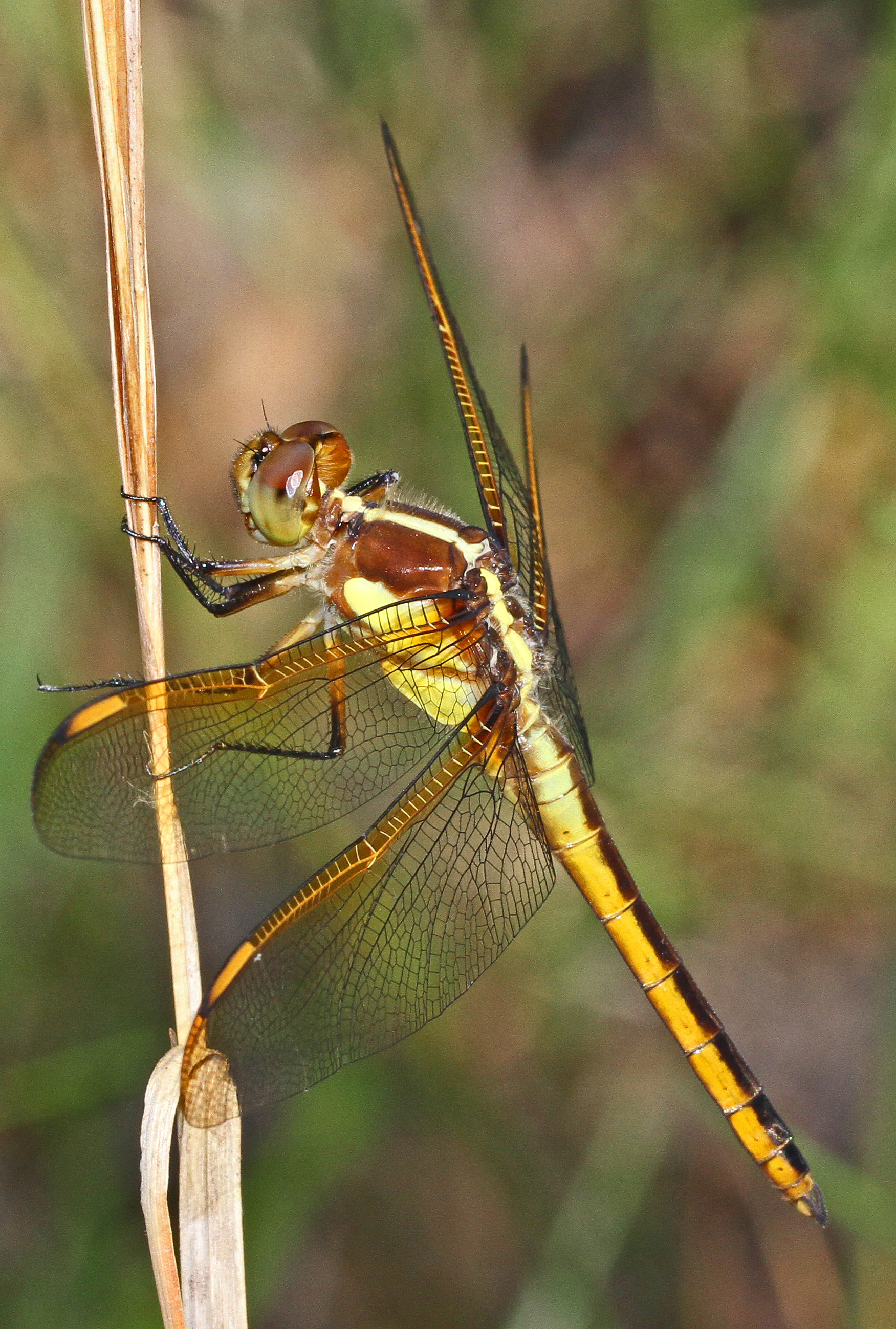
Yellow-sided skimmer, Libellula flavida

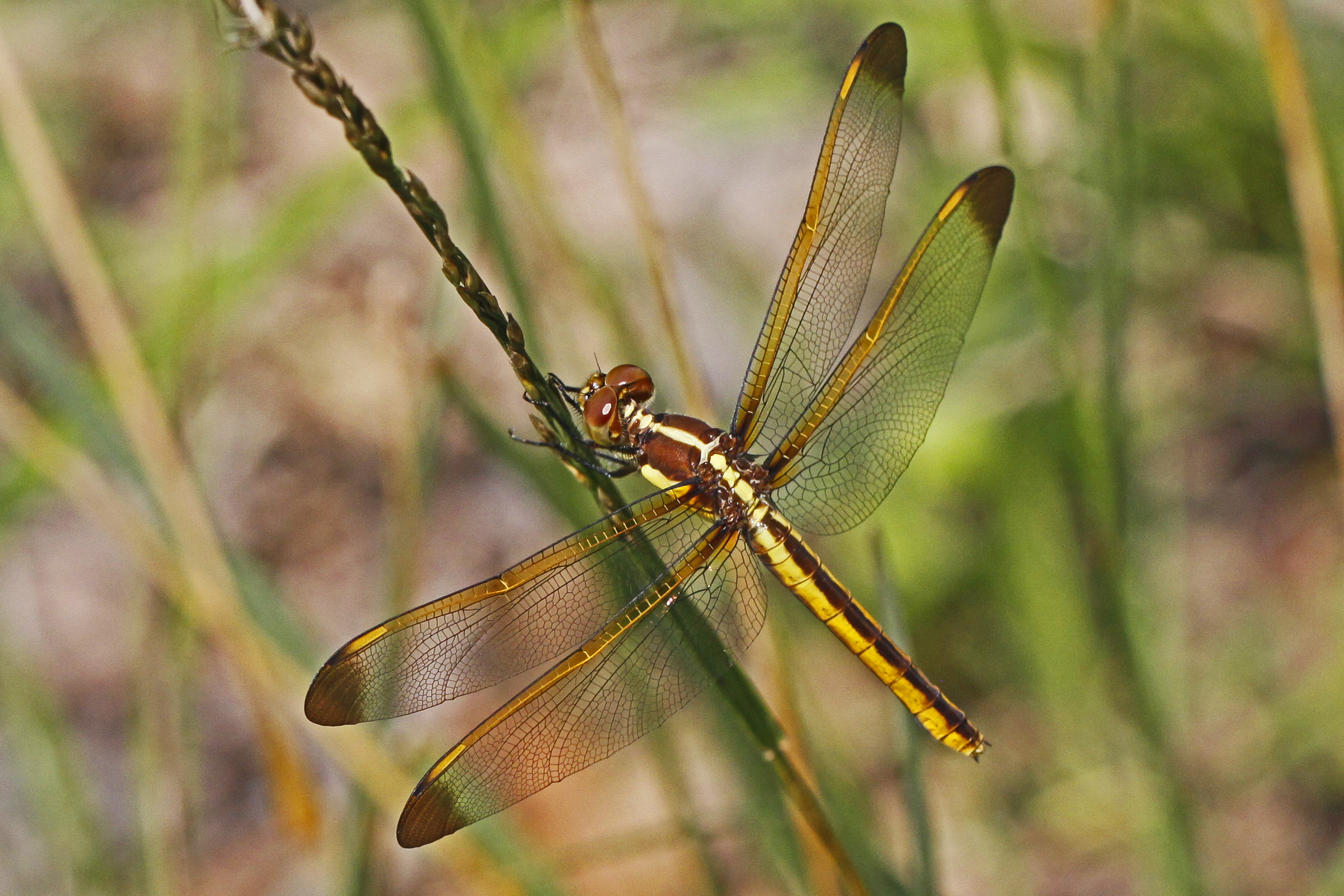
Yellow-sided skimmer, Libellula flavida

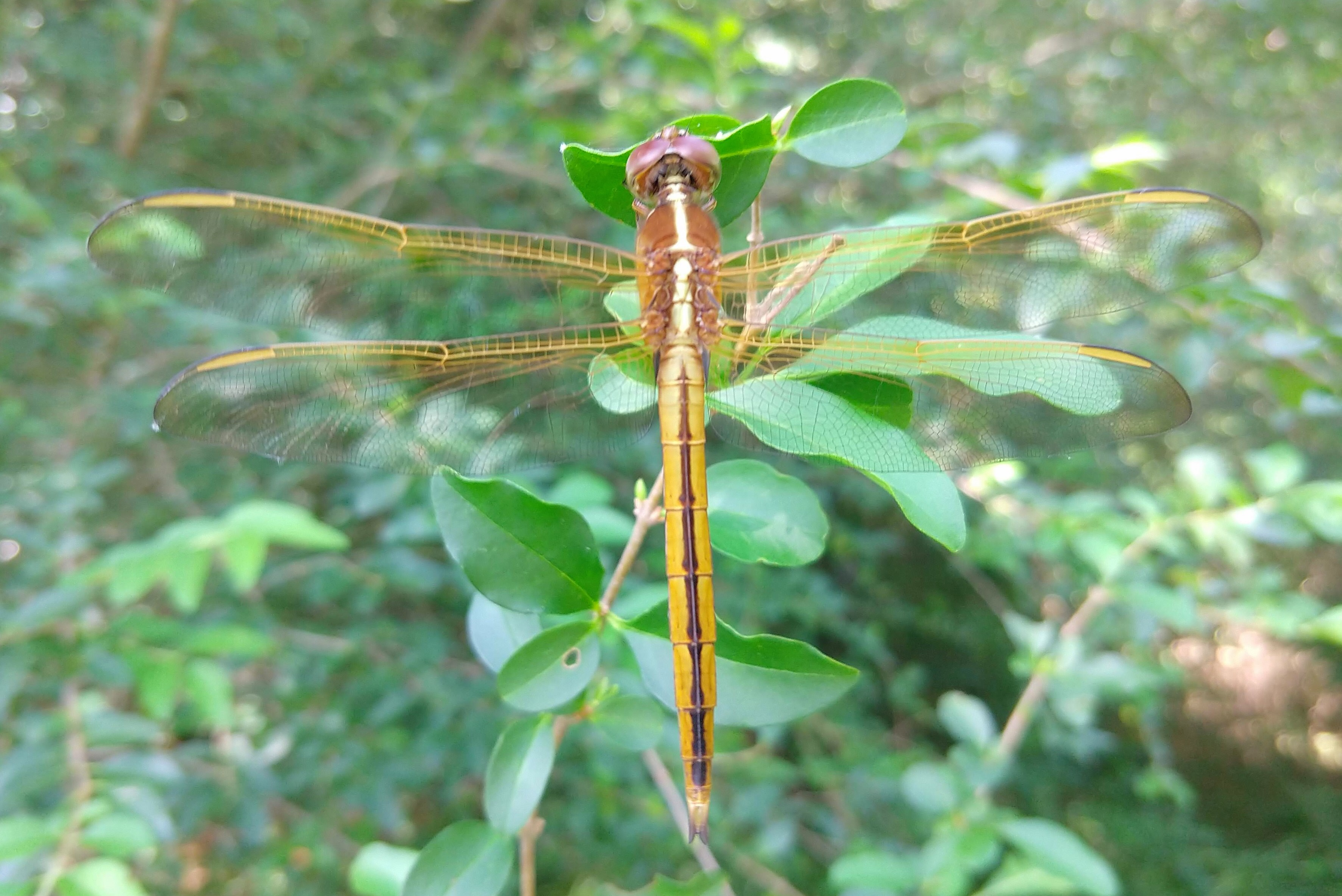
Libellula flavida dorsal view
