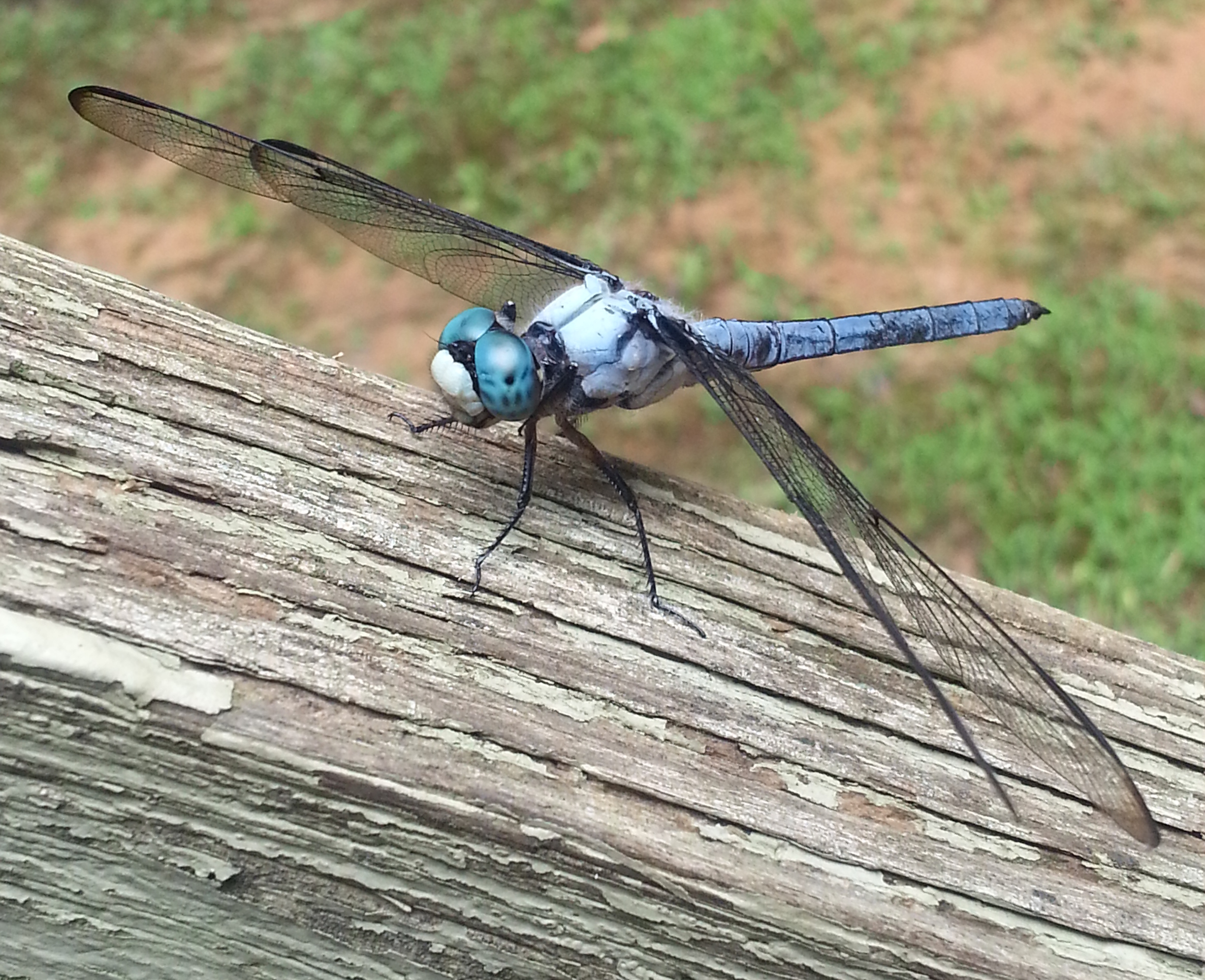

Conservation status
- Secure (NatureServe)

Scientific classification
- Kingdom: Animalia
- Phylum: Arthropoda
- Clade: Pancrustacea
- Class: Insecta
- Order: Odonata
- Infraorder: Anisoptera
- Family: Libellulidae
- Genus: Libellula
- Species: L. vibrans

Binomial name
- Libellula vibrans Fabricius, 1793
- Range of L. vibrans

= Great blue skimmer =

Species of dragonfly

The great blue skimmer (Libellula vibrans) is a dragonfly of the skimmer family. With a total length of 50 to 63 millimetres (2.0 to 2.5 in), it is one of the largest skimmers. The immature forms of the skimmer are brown in color and mature forms are blue-hued. This species is found near lakes, ponds, and slow streams in the eastern United States and rarely in southern Ontario.
