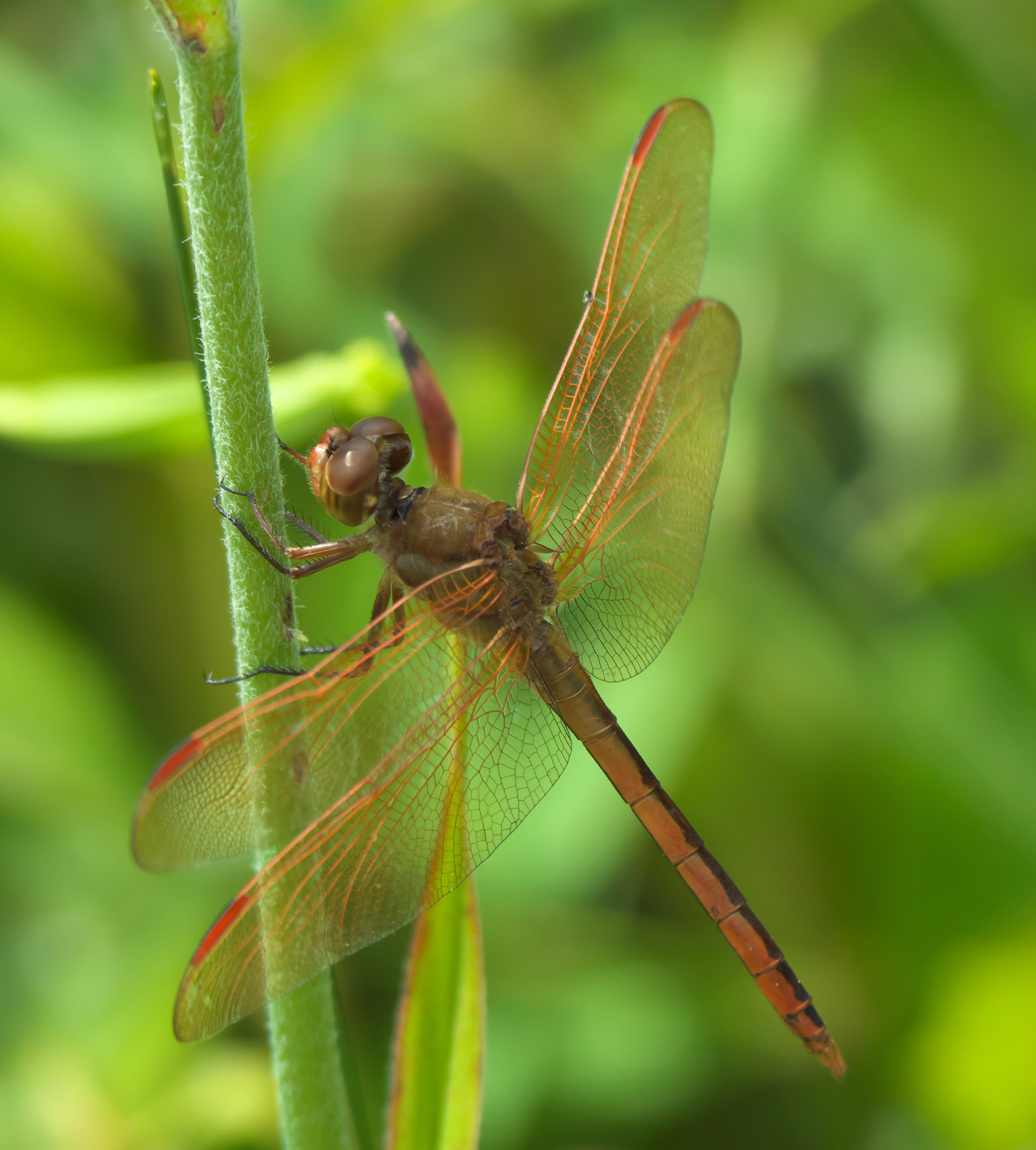

Conservation status
- Least Concern (IUCN 3.1)

- Secure (NatureServe)

Scientific classification
- Kingdom: Animalia
- Phylum: Arthropoda
- Clade: Pancrustacea
- Class: Insecta
- Order: Odonata
- Infraorder: Anisoptera
- Family: Libellulidae
- Genus: Libellula
- Species: L. auripennis

Binomial name
- Libellula auripennis Burmeister, 1839

= Libellula auripennis =

Species of dragonfly

Libellula auripennis, the golden-winged skimmer, is a species of skimmer in the family Libellulidae. It is found in North America.

== Conservation ==
The IUCN conservation status of Libellula auripennis is "LC", least concern, with no immediate threat to the species' survival. The population is stable.

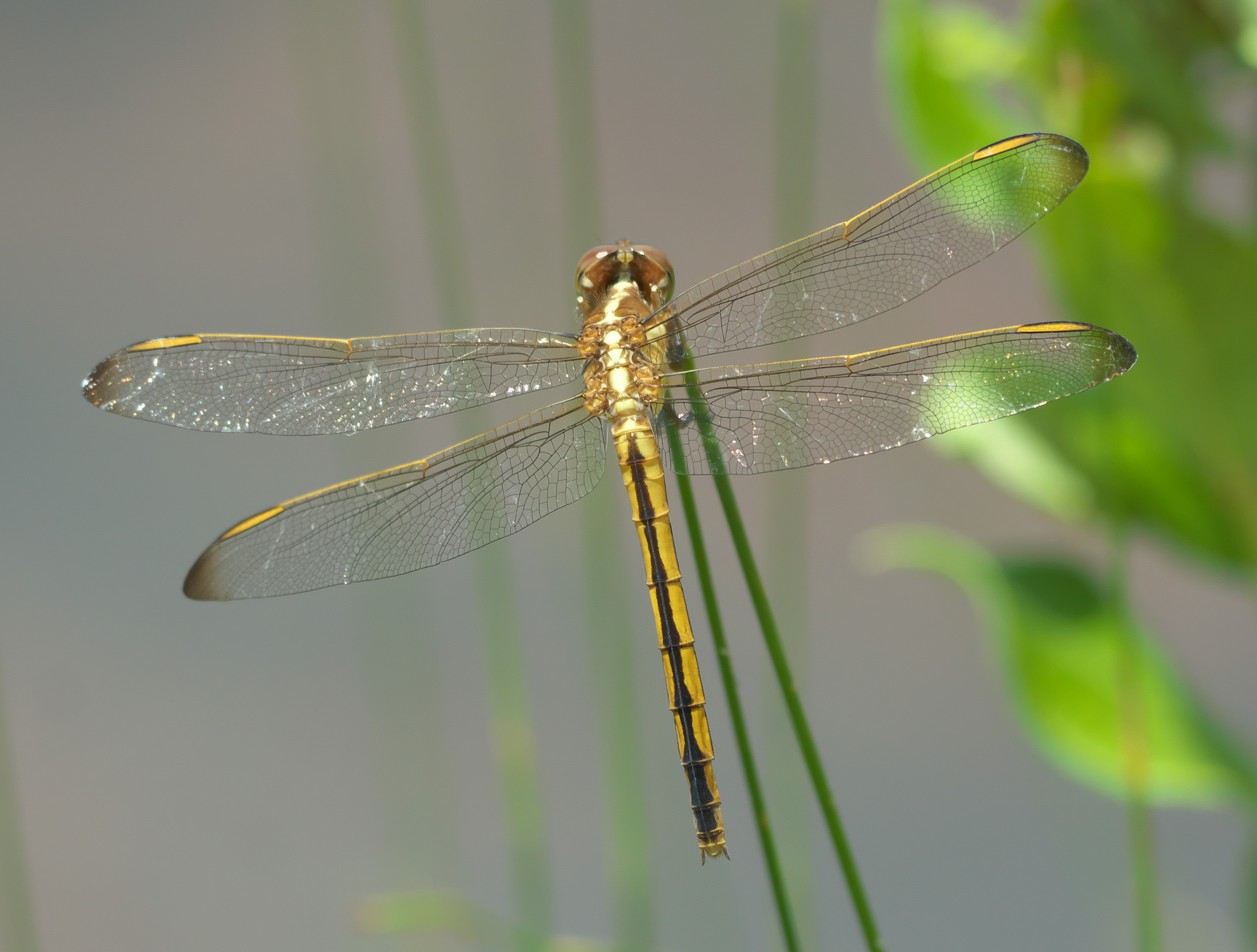
Golden-winged Skimmer, Libellula auripennis, Okefenokee Swamp, GA, USA

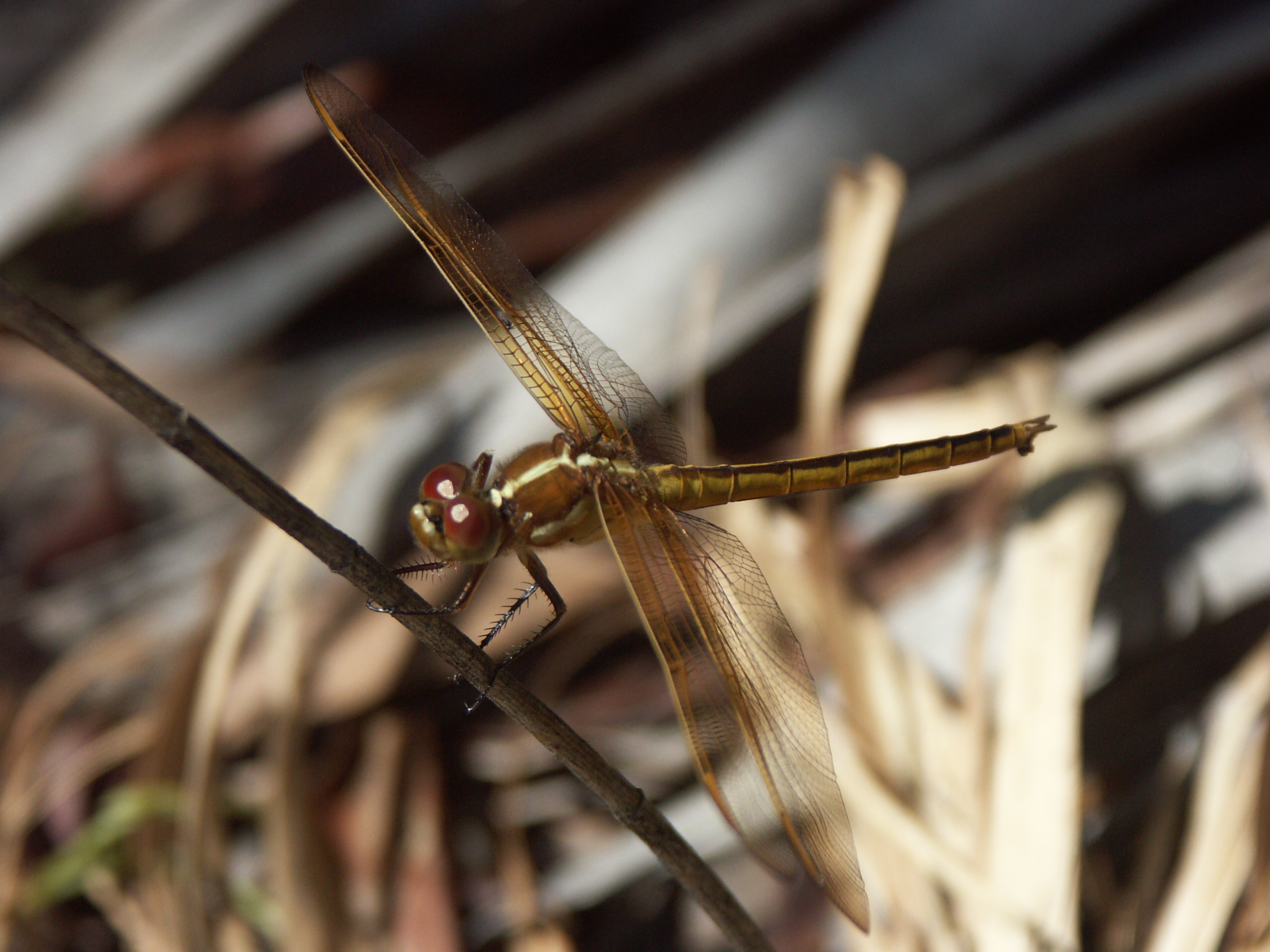
Golden-winged Skimmer, Libellula auripennis, Merritt Island, FL, USA
