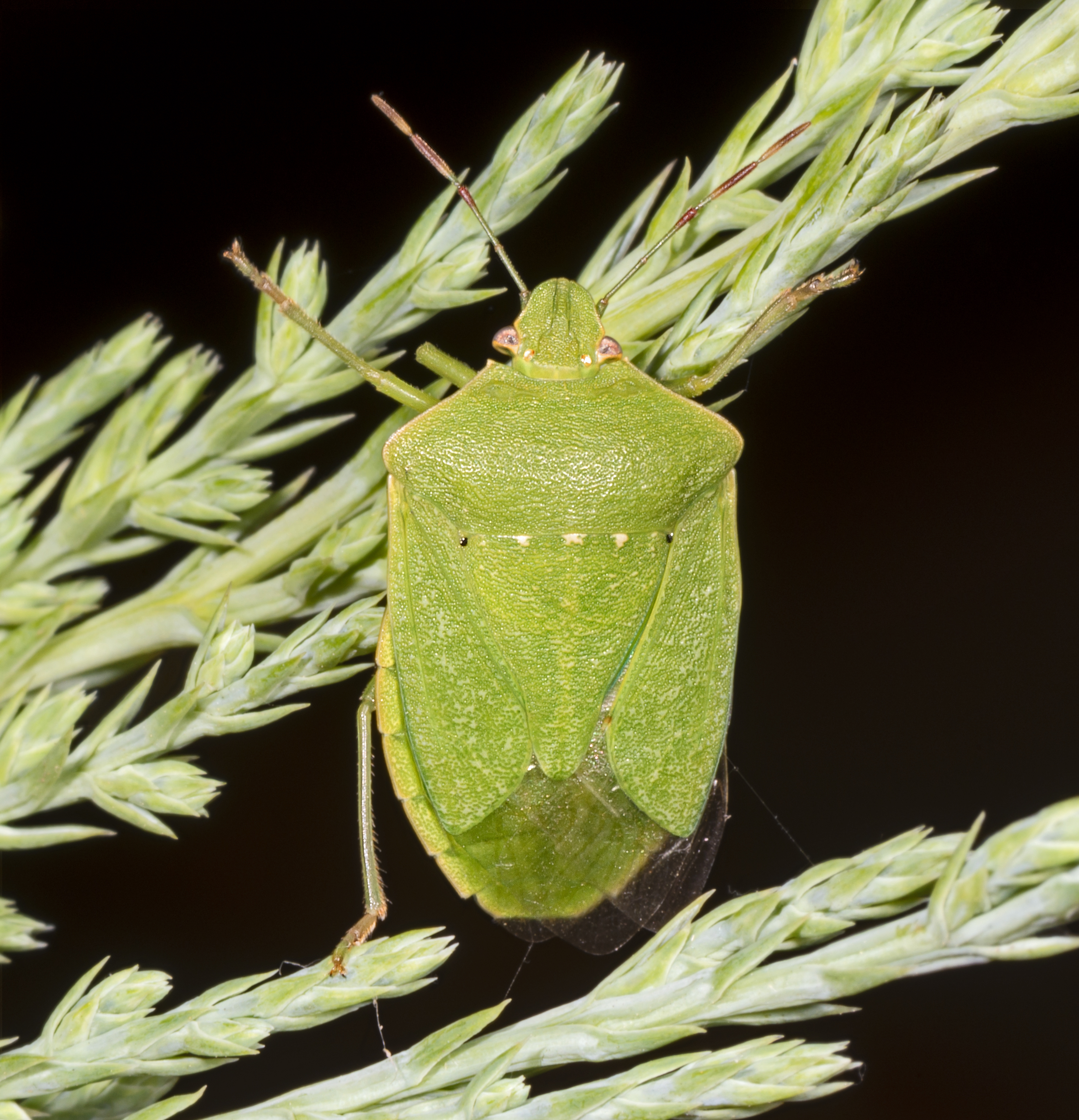

Scientific classification
- Kingdom: Animalia
- Phylum: Arthropoda
- Clade: Pancrustacea
- Class: Insecta
- Order: Hemiptera
- Suborder: Heteroptera
- Family: Pentatomidae
- Genus: Nezara
- Species: N. viridula

Binomial name
- Nezara viridula (Linnaeus, 1758)

Synonyms
- Cimex smaragdulus Fabricius, 1775; Cimex viridulus Linnaeus, 1758; Nezara approximata Reiche & Fairmaire, 1848; Nezara aurantiaca Costa, 1884

Audio

= Nezara viridula =

Species of true bug

Nezara viridula, commonly known as the southern green stink bug (USA), southern green shield bug (UK) or green vegetable bug (Australia and New Zealand), is a plant-feeding stink bug. Believed to have originated in Ethiopia, it can now be found across the world. Because of its preference for certain species of legumes, such as beans and soybeans, it is an economically important pest on such crops.

== Distribution ==
Nezara viridula is a cosmopolitan species, living in tropical and subtropical regions of the Americas, Africa, Asia, Australasia, and Europe between 45 degrees north and 45 degrees south. Its exact origin is unknown, but it is believed to have originated from the Ethiopia region of East Africa, from where it has spread around the world due to its strong flight and human transport along trade routes.

== Description ==
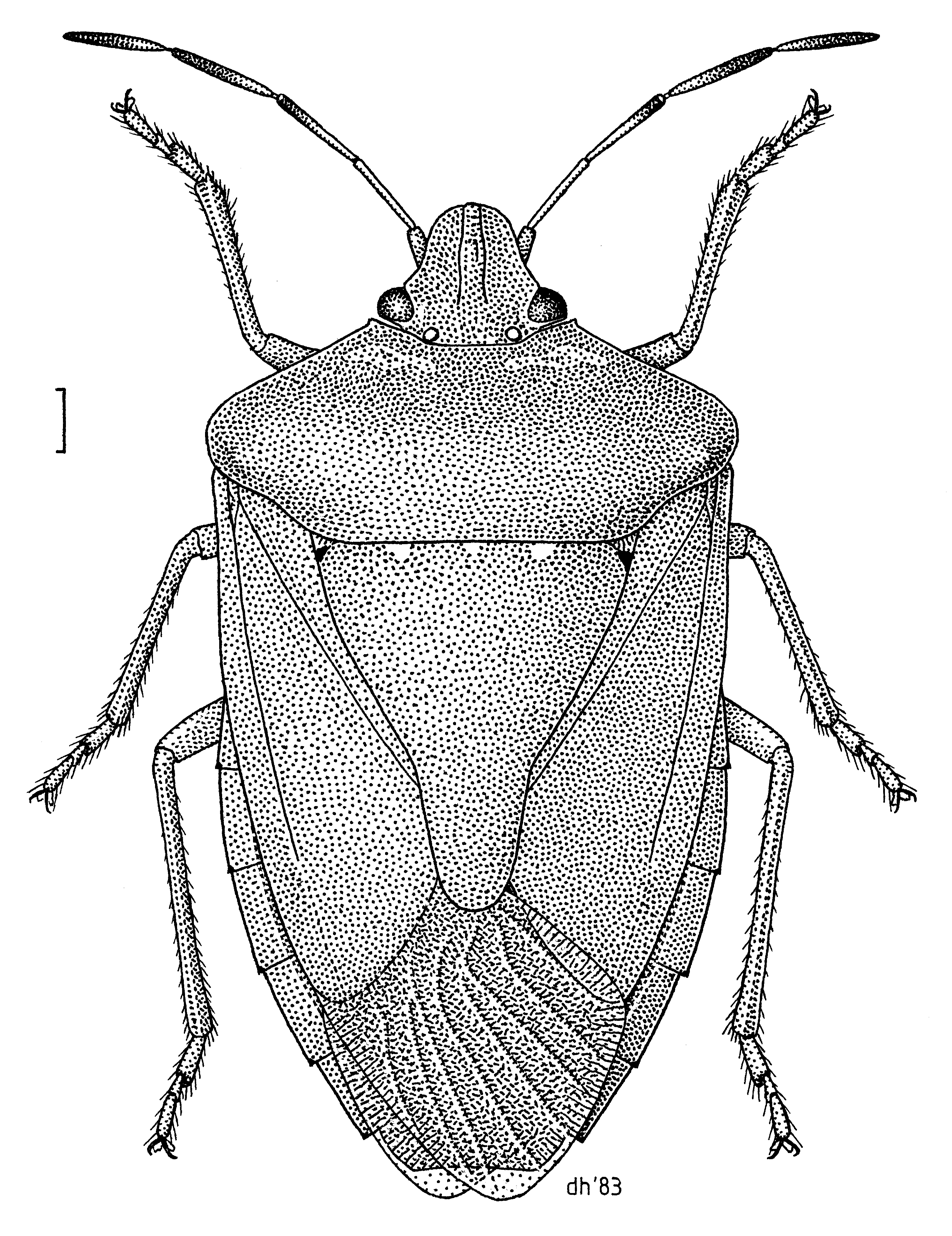
Nezara viridula illustrated by Des Helmore

The adult males can reach a body length (from front to elytral apex) of about 12.1 millimetres (0.48 in), while females are bigger, reaching a size of about 13.1 millimetres (0.52 in). The body is usually bright green and shield-shaped and the eyes are most commonly reddish, but they may also be black. There is a row of three white spots on the scutellum. They differ from the similar green stink bug (Chinavia hilaris) by the shape of their scent gland openings, which are short and wide in N. viridula, and narrow and long in the green stink bug.

=== Color morphs ===
Several distinct morphs can be distinguished by the pattern of their exoskeleton coloration. The most common morph is predominantly green (Nezara viridula f. smaragdula), a less common morph is green with white or yellowish front margins on the head and the thorax (Nezara viridula f. torquata Fabricius, 1775) and a very rare morph has a uniformly orange or yellow (occasionally pink) coloration (Nezara viridula f. aurantiaca).

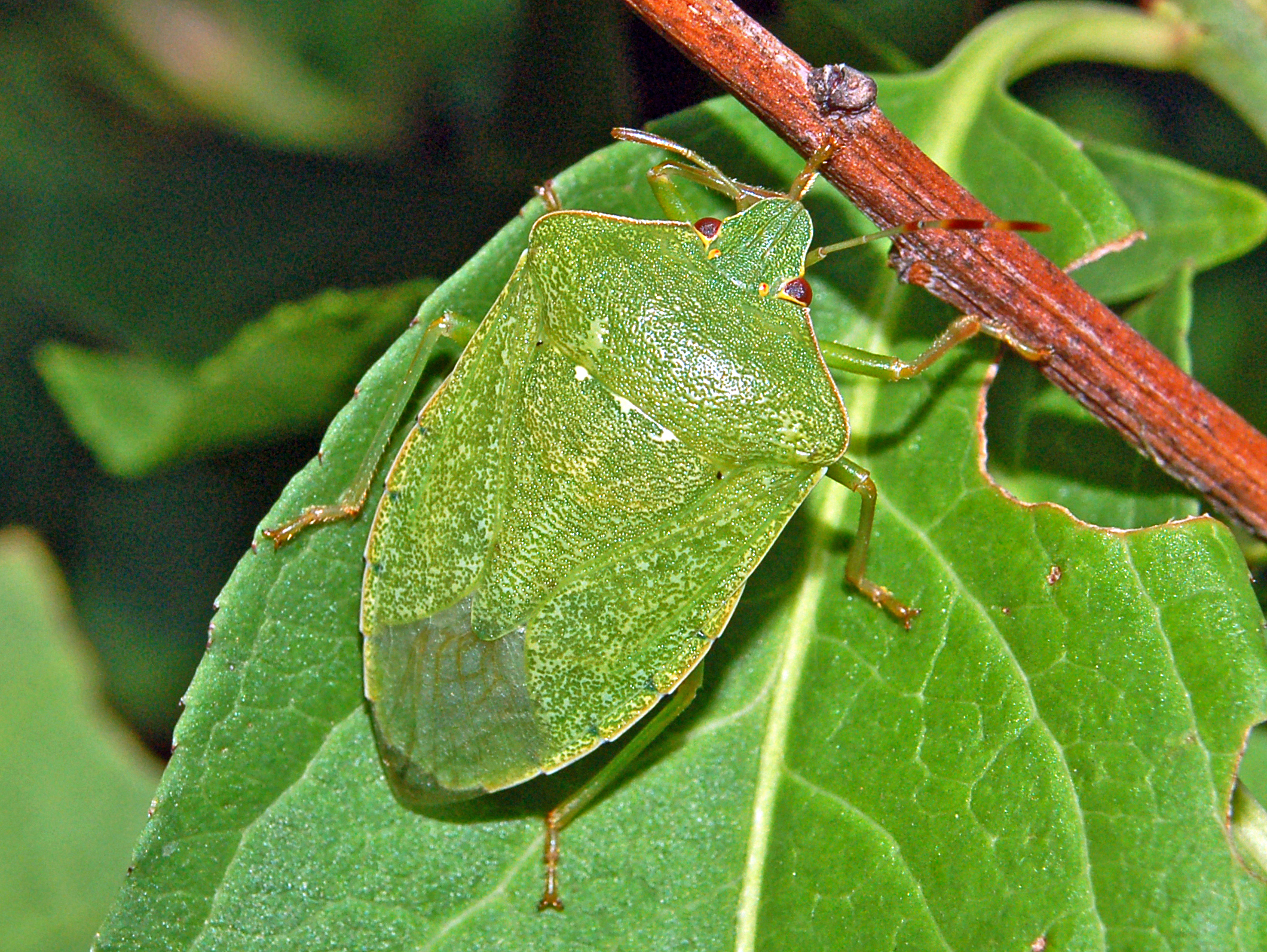
Nezara viridula f. smaragdula

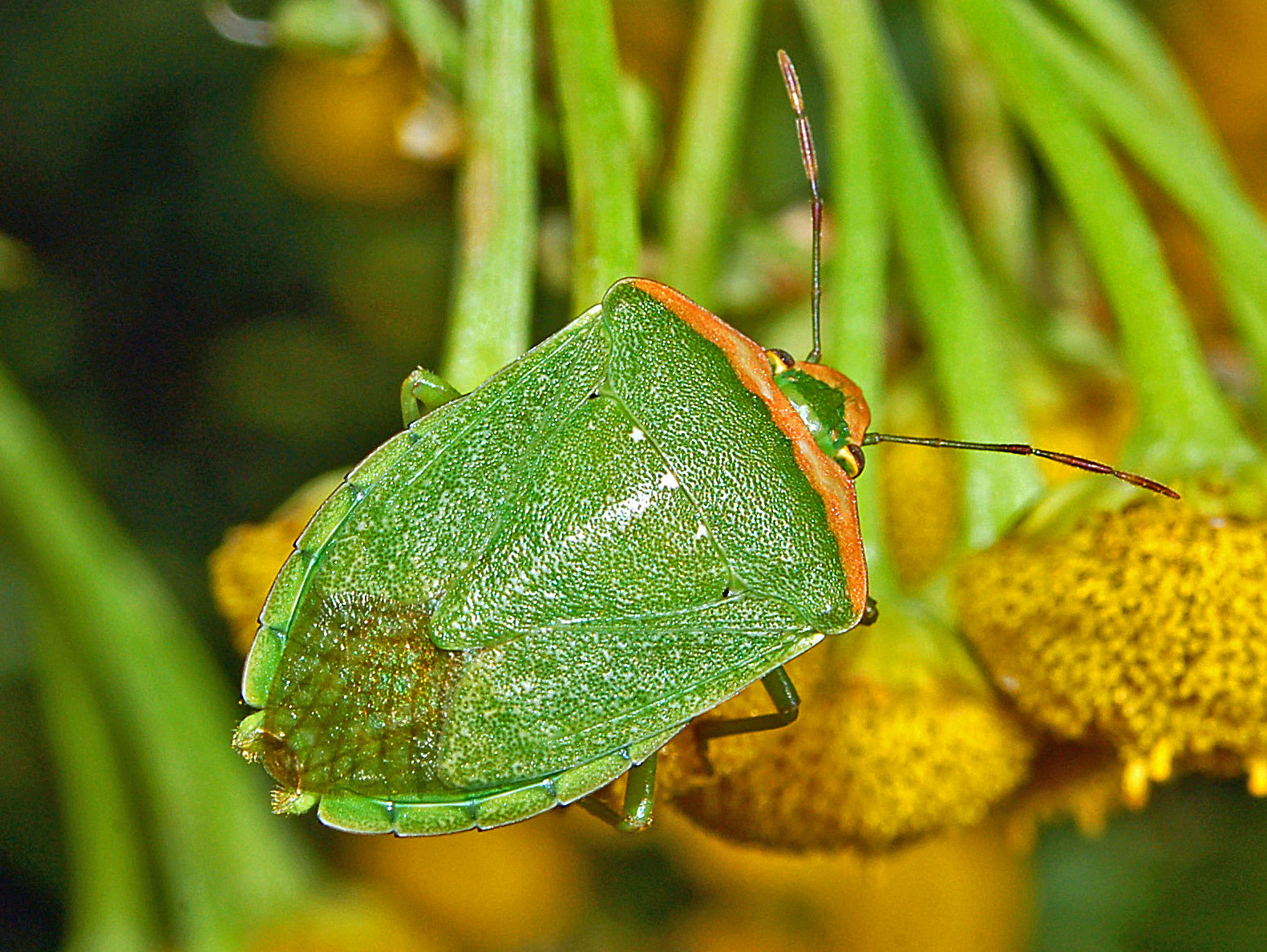
Nezara viridula f. torquata

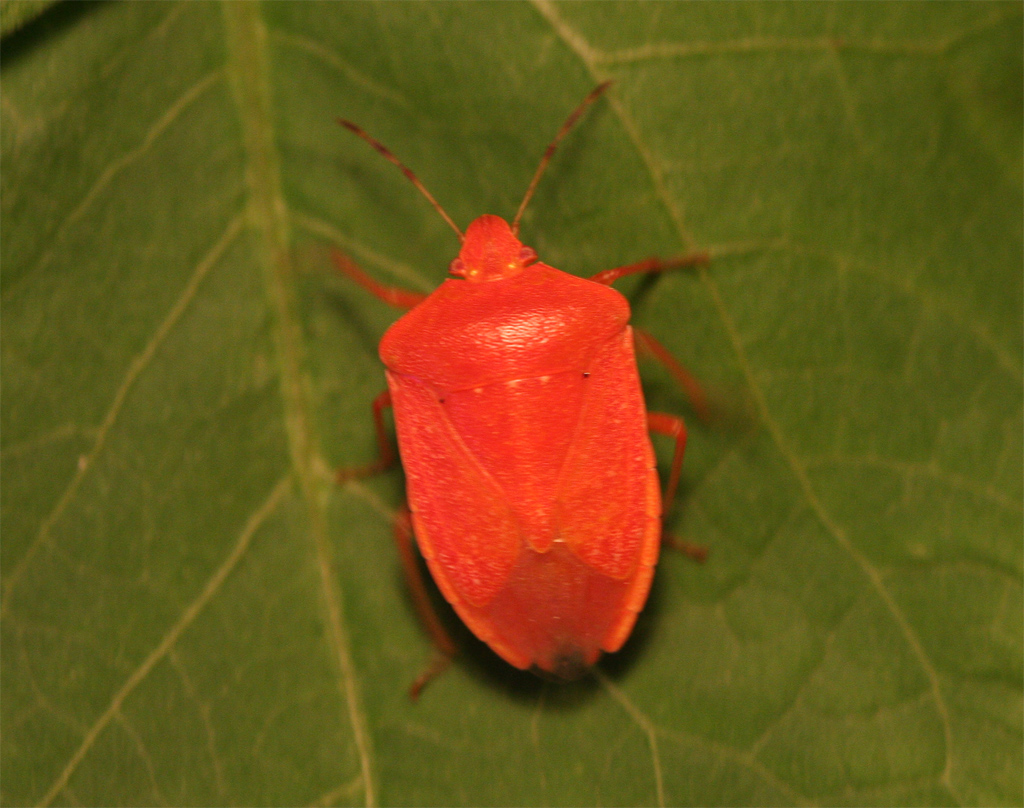
Nezara viridula f. aurantiaca

== Life history ==
Nezara viridula reproduces throughout the year in the tropics. In temperate zones this species exhibits a reproductive winter diapause associated with a reversible change of body colouration from green to brown or russet.

When ready to mate N. viridula produce 100 Hz vibrations with a "tymbal" composed of fused first and second terga (not to be confused with tymbal of cicadas) that allow bi-directional communication to any Nezara standing on the same plant so they could find each other. The female lays 30 to 130 eggs at a time, in the form of an egg mass glued firmly to the bottom of a leaf. The eggs are barrel-shaped with an opening on the top. The eggs take between 5 and 21 days to develop, depending on the temperature. The newborn nymphs gather near the empty eggs and do not feed until three days later, after the first moult. They moult five times before reaching maturity, increasing in size each time. Each instar stage lasts about a week, except for the last one which is a day longer. Up to four generations can develop in one year, with eggs developing into adults in as few as 35 days in mid-summer. Up until their third moult the nymphs aggregate together on the host plant; the purpose of this aggregation is probably pooling of chemical defenses against predators such as ants.

== Ecology ==
It is a highly polyphagous herbivore, able to feed on plants from over 30 families, both monocots and dicots. It has a preference for legumes, especially plants that are fruiting or forming pods.

The most important factor limiting the population in temperate zones is winter cold. Mortality of overwintering individuals is between 30 and 80%, and the population cannot survive in areas where the average mid-winter temperature is below 5 °C. Females are more likely to survive the winter than males, as are larger individuals and those that develop reddish-brown coloration. In recent decades, the species seems to be expanding its range towards the north in the northern hemisphere. The animal's ability to survive the winter also depends on the timely onset of diapause.

=== Environmental sensitivity ===
==== Temperature ====
They prefer temperatures 22°C to 27°C. Temperature affects survival in N. viridula and other Pentatomidae species (e.g. P. prasina). Survival is highest at intermediate temperatures around 30°C and 35°C, and decreases as temperatures increase past the optimum. However, individuals reared under hot temperatures can acclimate such that survival increases at hotter temperatures. Stink bugs can also acclimate to cold temperatures through rapid cold hardening, which reduces mortality when they are stressed by cold temperatures later on.

Seasonal changes in temperature provide important cues to N. viridula that affect growth, reproduction, and fitness. Warmer temperatures in early spring can increase egg production and accelerate development. Warmer temperatures in the late summer can often be stressful, potentially stunting growth and decrease survival. Finally, warmer winter temperatures can increase survival. In the winter, there are differences in survivorship depending on size in N. viridula, where larger females tend to have higher survival rates. Temperature, in combination with other abiotic factors, can therefore have substantial influence on stink bugs across their lifetime.

Other environmental effects

Short photoperiods during the nymphal stage can increase development when coupled with cooler temperatures, but decrease developmental time when coupled with hot temperatures. Humidity can also affect fitness in N. viridula. In low humidity conditions, eggs require more time to hatch. In high humidity conditions, particularly when coupled with high temperatures, survival and longevity decrease.

== Gallery ==
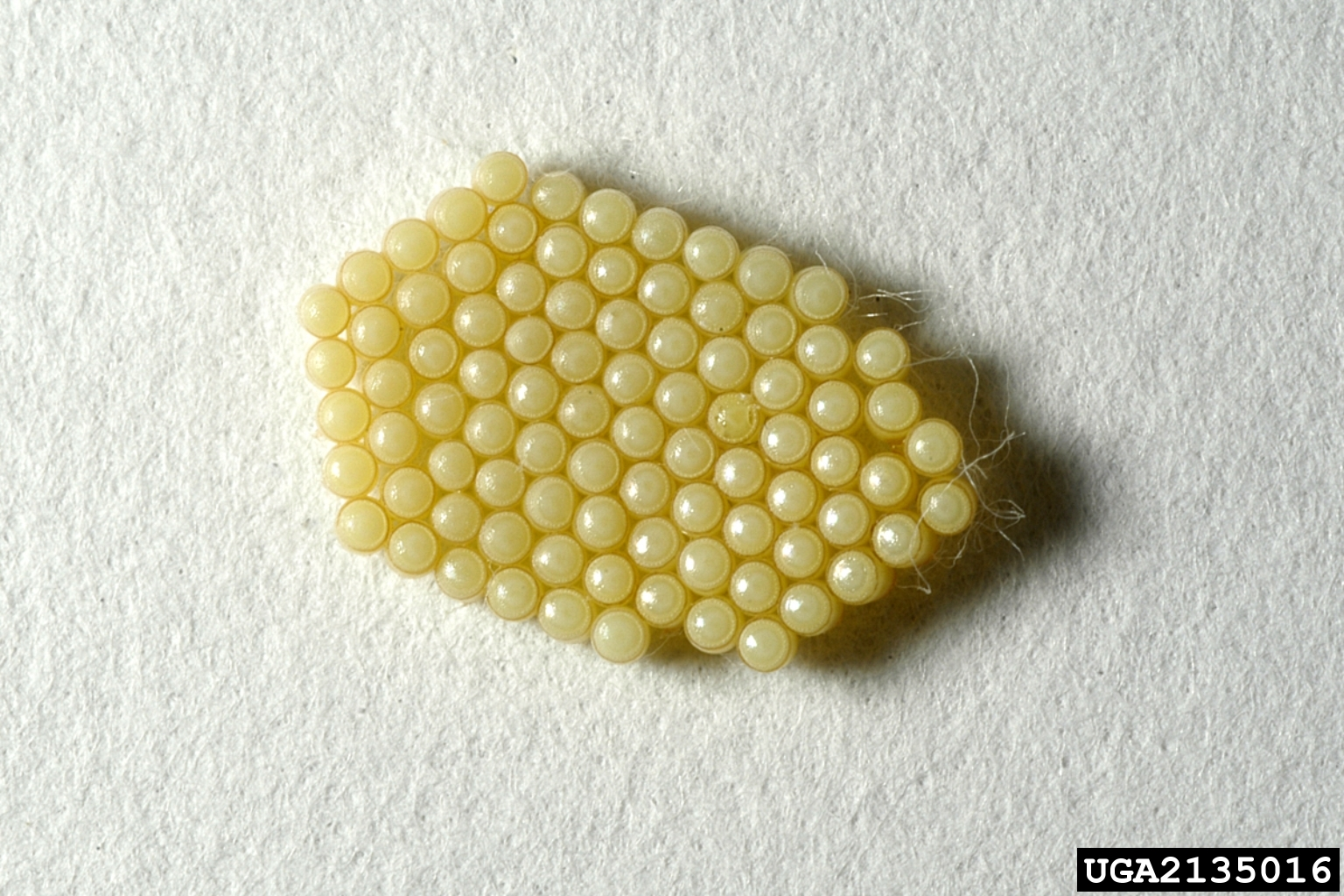
Eggs

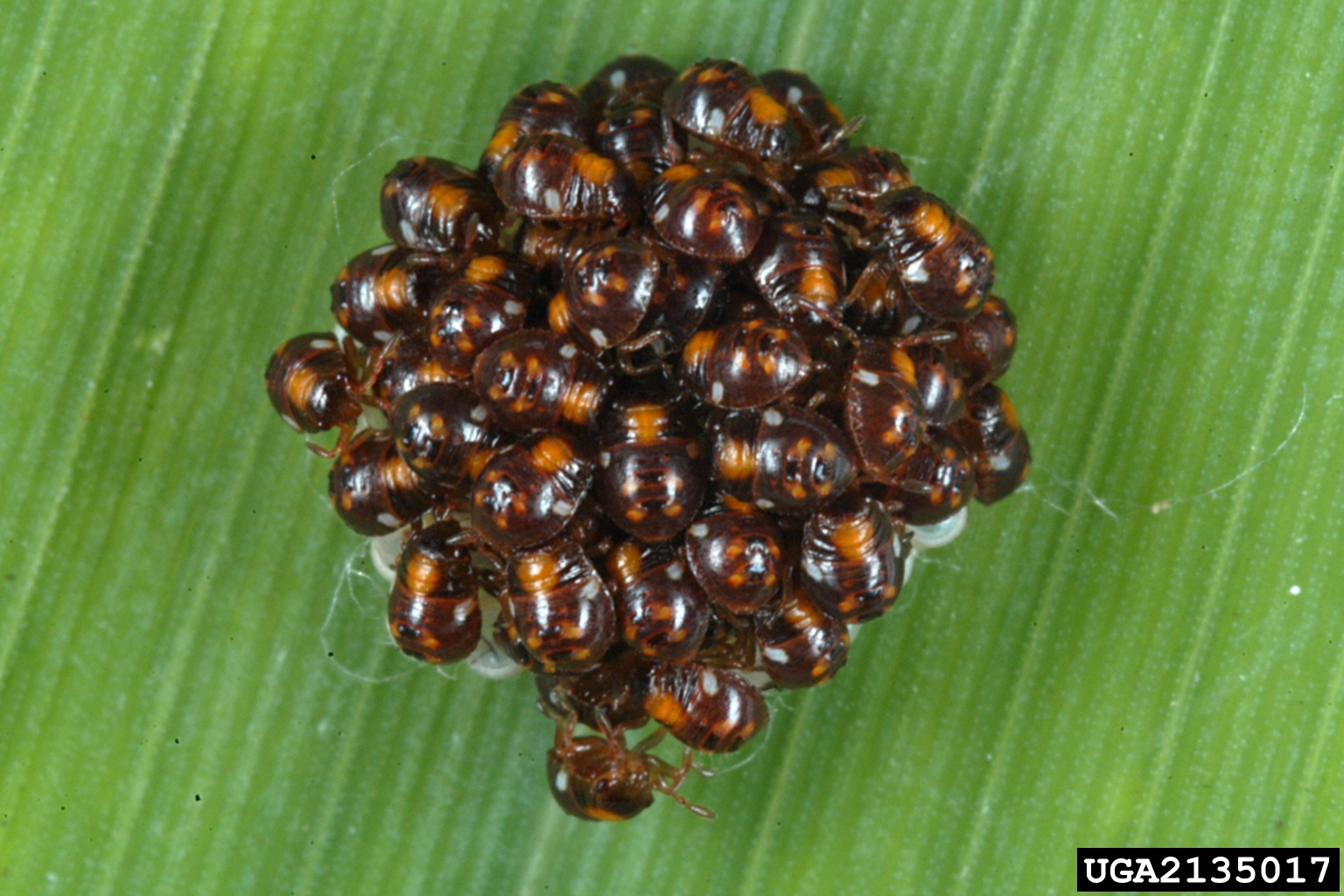
First instar

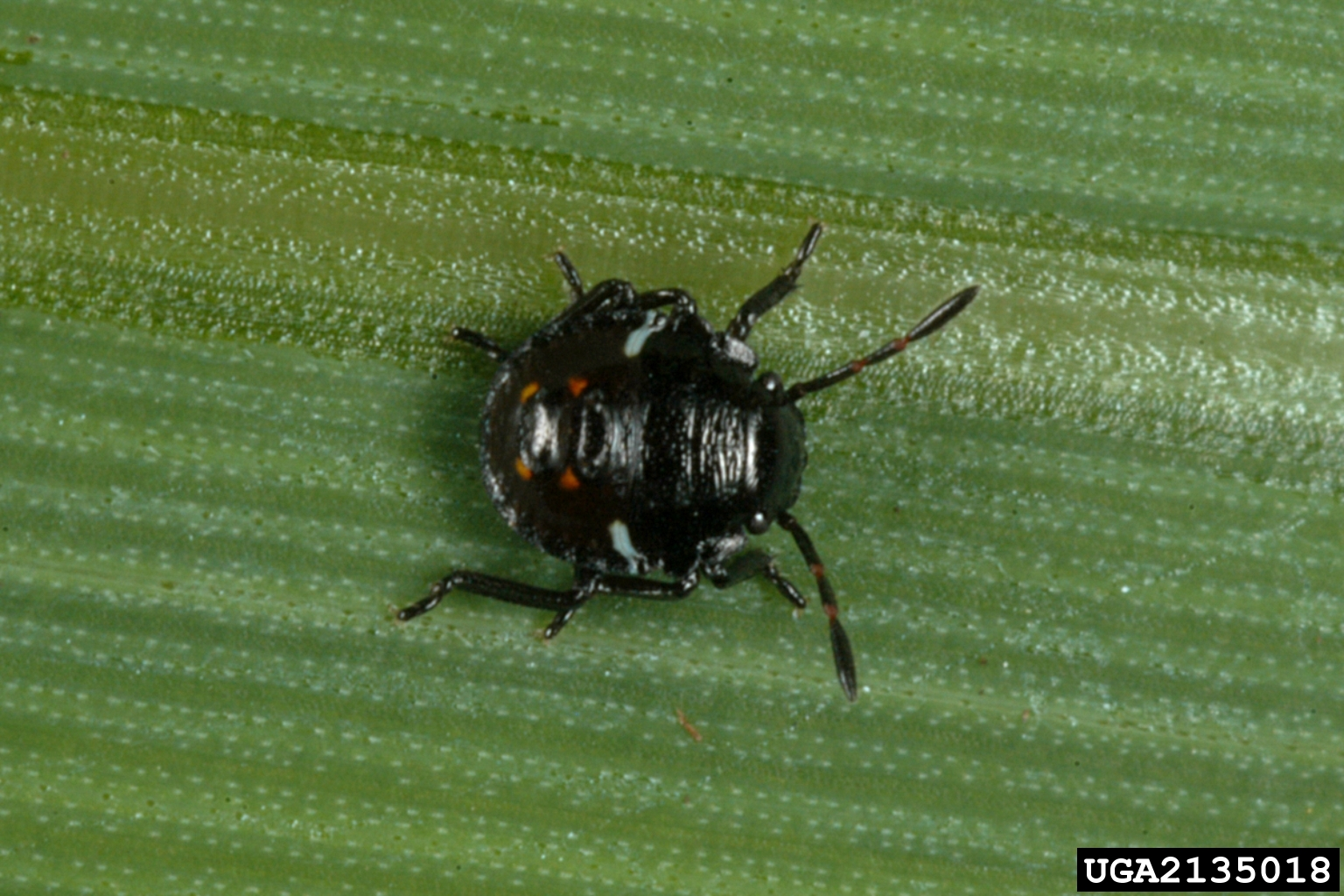
Second instar

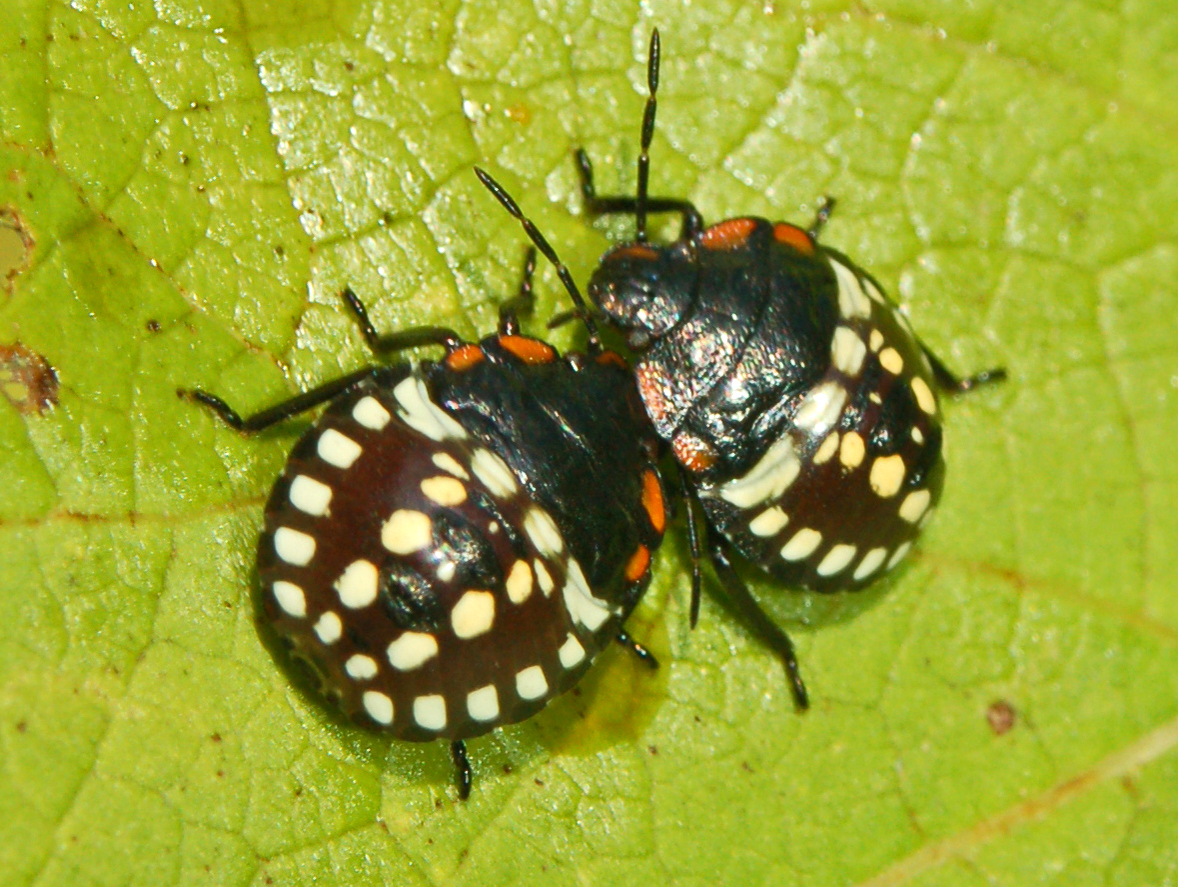
Third instar

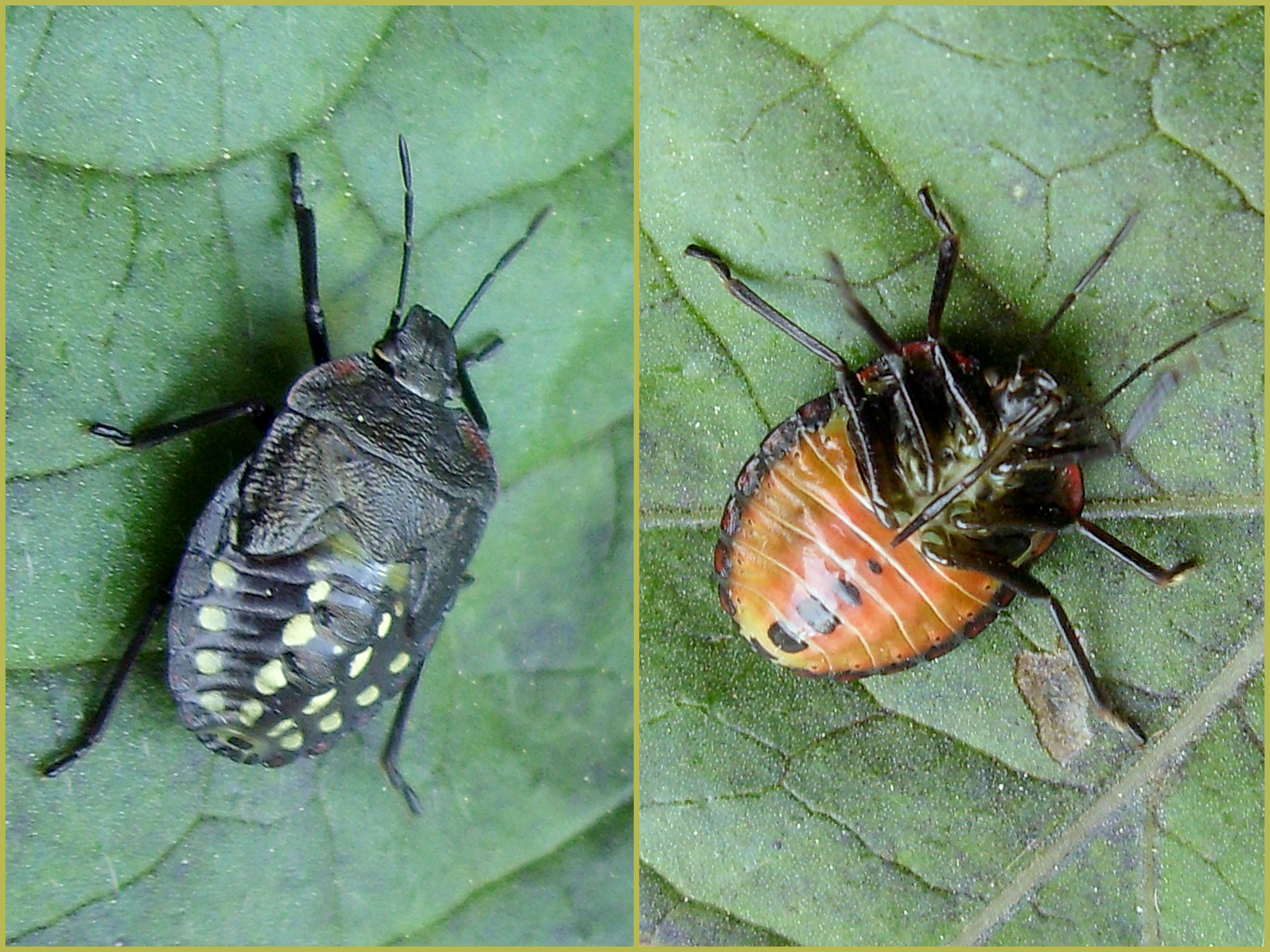
Fourth instar

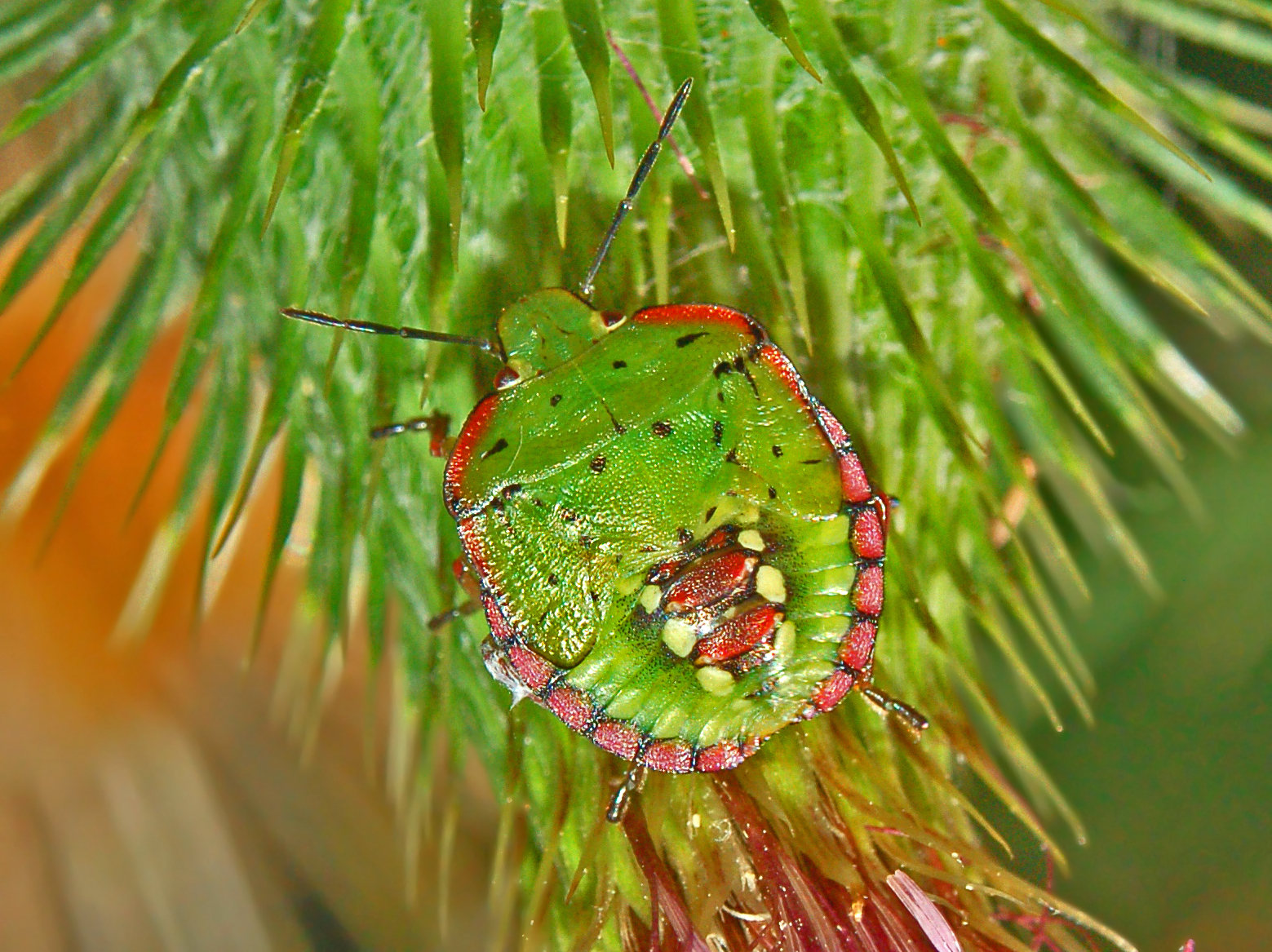
Fifth instar

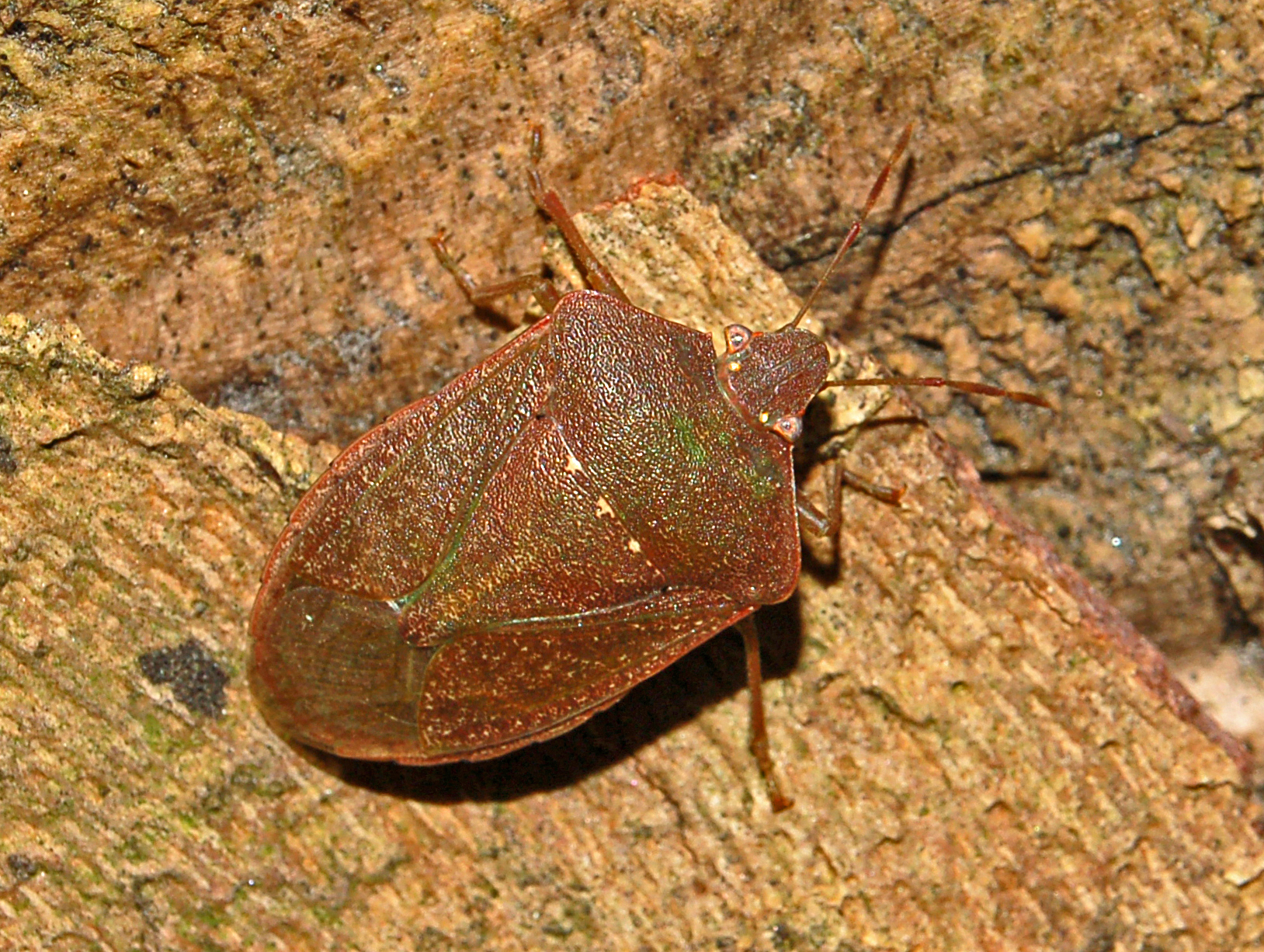
Adult, winter color pattern

== See also ==
- Green stink bug (Chinavia hilaris)
