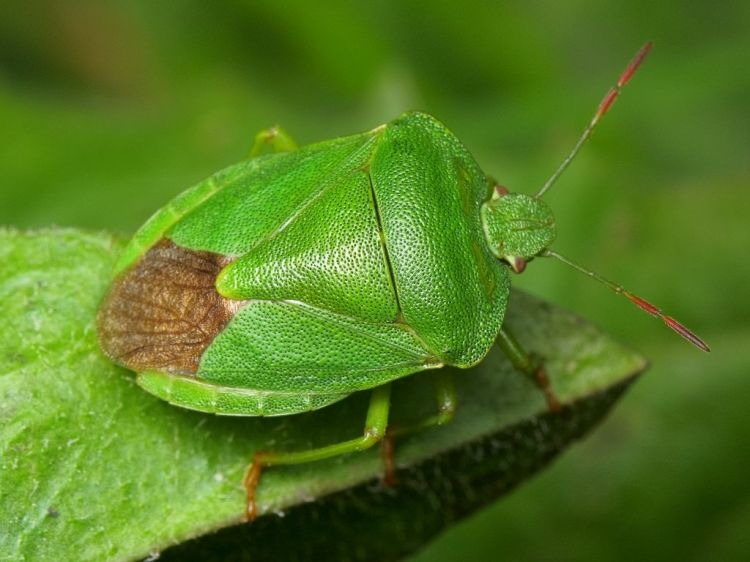
- Palomena viridissima

Scientific classification
- Domain: Eukaryota
- Kingdom: Animalia
- Phylum: Arthropoda
- Class: Insecta
- Order: Hemiptera
- Suborder: Heteroptera
- Family: Pentatomidae
- Subfamily: Pentatominae
- Tribe: Nezarini
- Genus: Palomena
- Species: P. viridissima

Binomial name
- Palomena viridissima (Poda, 1761)

Synonyms
- Palomena amplificata Distant, 1880; Palomena rubicunda Westhoff, 1884; Palomena simulans Puton, 1881; Pentatoma rotundicollis Westwood, 1837

= Palomena viridissima =

Species of true bug

Palomena viridissima is a European species of shield bug in the tribe Nezarini.

== Gallery ==
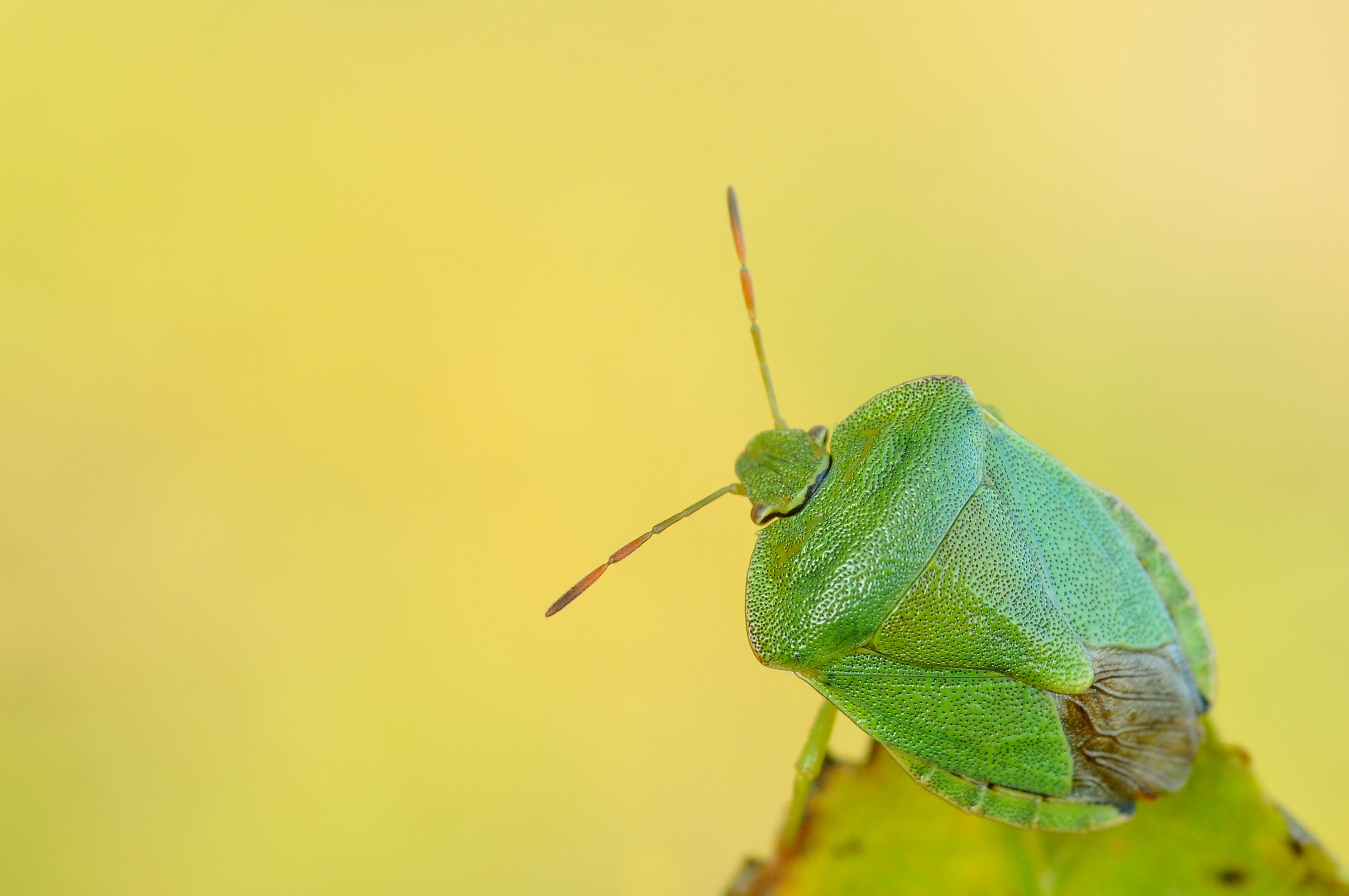

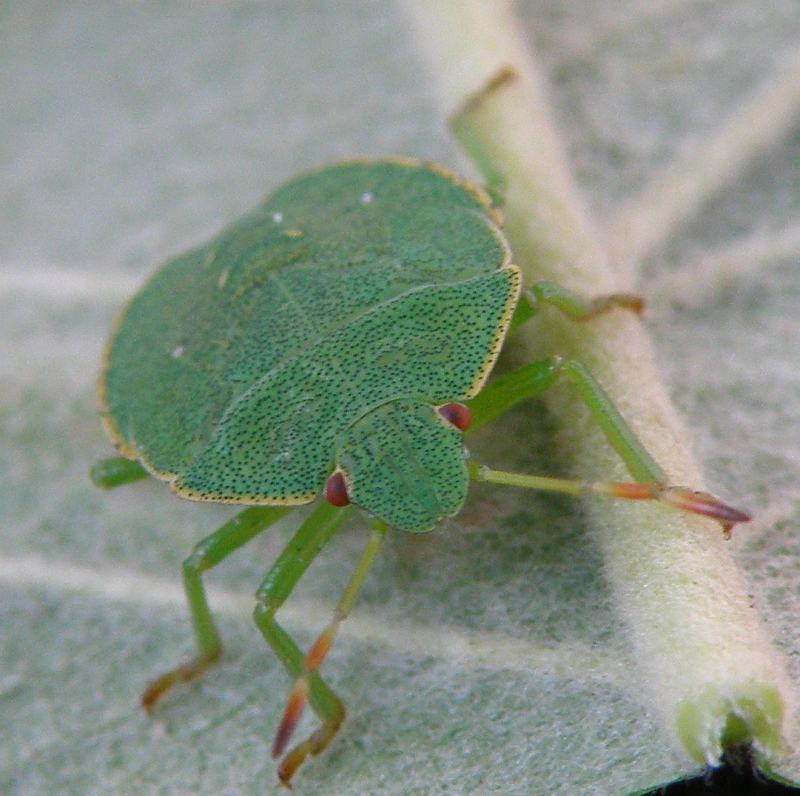
nymph
