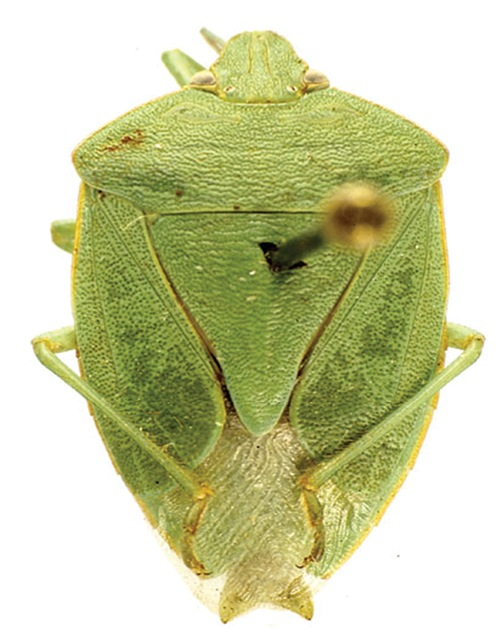

Scientific classification
- Kingdom: Animalia
- Phylum: Arthropoda
- Clade: Pancrustacea
- Class: Insecta
- Order: Hemiptera
- Suborder: Heteroptera
- Family: Pentatomidae
- Genus: Chinavia
- Species: C. aseada

Binomial name
- Chinavia aseada (Rolston, 1983)

Synonyms
- Acrosternum aseadum Rolston, 1983; Chinavia aseadum Rolston, 1983

= Chinavia aseada =

Species of true bug

Chinavia aseada is a species of plant bugs belonging to the family Pentatomidae that is endemic to Passo Fundo, Brazil.
