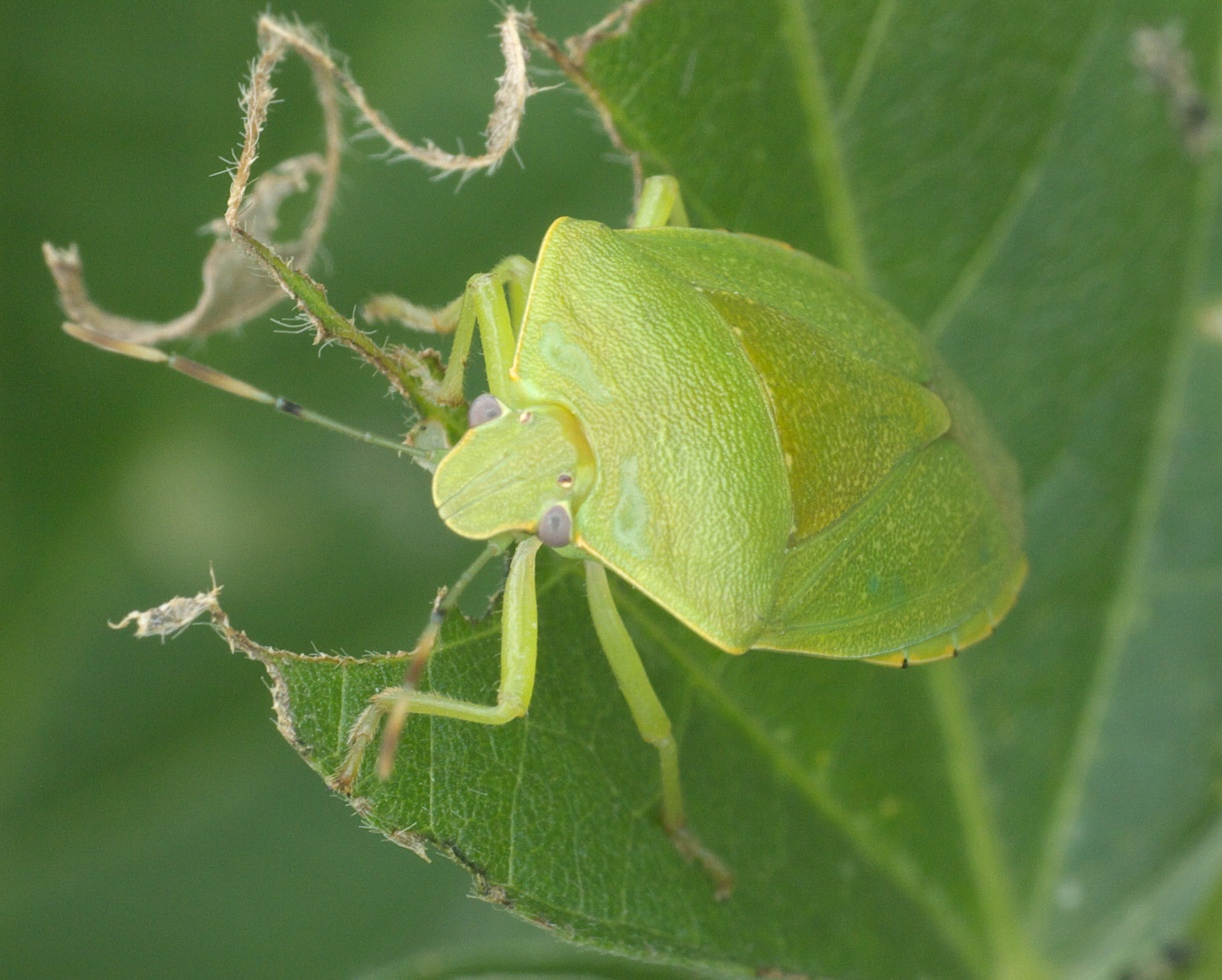
- Chinavia

Scientific classification
- Kingdom: Animalia
- Phylum: Arthropoda
- Clade: Pancrustacea
- Class: Insecta
- Order: Hemiptera
- Suborder: Heteroptera
- Family: Pentatomidae
- Subfamily: Pentatominae
- Tribe: Nezarini
- Genus: Chinavia; Orian, 1965

= Chinavia =

Genus of true bugs

Chinavia is a genus of green stink bugs in the family Pentatomidae. There are more than 80 described species in Chinavia.

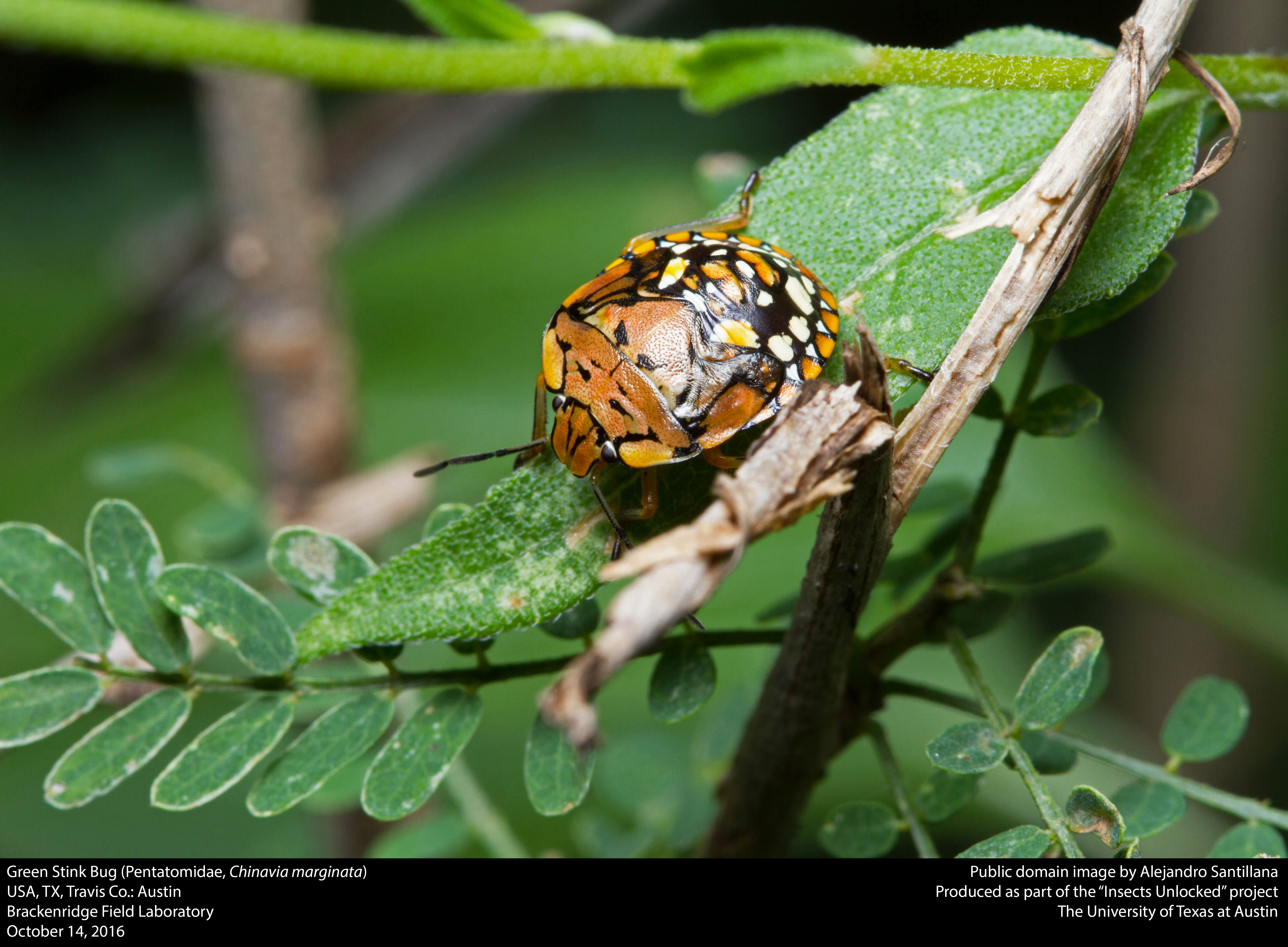
Chinavia marginata

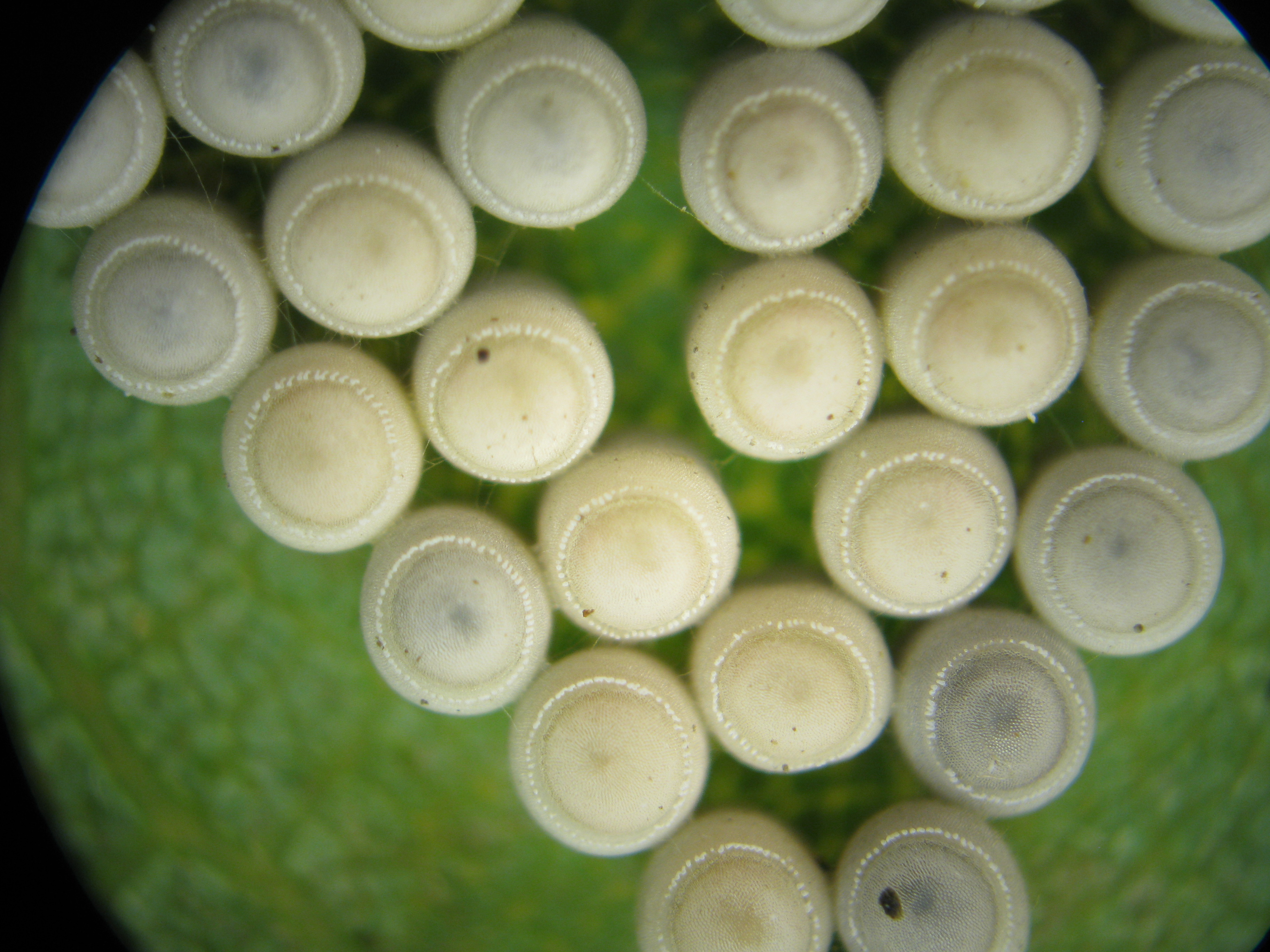
Eggs

== Species ==
These species belong to the genus Chinavia:

- Chinavia abnormis (Berg, 1892)
- Chinavia acuta (Dallas, 1851)
- Chinavia aequalis (Linnavuori, 1975)
- Chinavia aliena (Schouteden, 1960)
- Chinavia amosi (Linnavuori, 1982)
- Chinavia apicicornis (Spinola, 1852)
- Chinavia armigera (Stål, 1859)
- Chinavia aseada (Rolston, 1983)
- Chinavia australe (Rolston, 1983)
- Chinavia bella (Rolston, 1983)
- Chinavia bergrothi (Horváth, 1904)
- Chinavia bipunctula (Stål, 1872)
- Chinavia brasicola (Rolston, 1983)
- Chinavia callosa (Rolston, 1983)
- Chinavia collis (Rolston, 1983)
- Chinavia cubensis (Rider, 1987)
- Chinavia dallasi (Distant, 1900)
- Chinavia difficilis (Stål, 1860)
- Chinavia dispar (Schouteden, 1960)
- Chinavia distans (Schouteden, 1960)
- Chinavia dubia (Rider & Rolston, 1986)
- Chinavia ecuadoriensis (Rolston, 1983)
- Chinavia emmerezi (Schouteden, 1905)
- Chinavia erythrocnemis (Berg, 1878)
- Chinavia esmeralda (Rolston, 1983)
- Chinavia euri (Rolston, 1983)
- Chinavia fieberi (Stål, 1865)
- Chinavia froeschneri (Rolston, 1983)
- Chinavia frolowi (Cachan, 1952)
- Chinavia fuscopunctata (Breddin, 1901)
- Chinavia geniculata (Dallas, 1951)
- Chinavia gerstaeckeri (Bergroth, 1891)
- Chinavia gravis (Walker, 1867)
- Chinavia gregi (Eger, 1988)
- Chinavia herbida (Stål, 1859)
- Chinavia hilaris (Say, 1831)
- Chinavia immaculata (Frey-da-Silva & Grazia, 2001)
- Chinavia impicticornis (Stål, 1872)
- Chinavia insulani (Rolston, 1983)
- Chinavia ista (Rolston, 1983)
- Chinavia kasaica (Schouteden, 1960)
- Chinavia laeta (Stål, 1859)
- Chinavia limbosa (Horváth, 1904)
- Chinavia liturata (Horváth, 1904)
- Chinavia longicorialis (Breddin, 1901)
- Chinavia macdonaldi (Rolston, 1983)
- Chinavia macrorhaphis (Horváth, 1904)
- Chinavia marginata (Palisot de Beauvois, 1817)
- Chinavia monticola (Rolston, 1983)
- Chinavia montivaga (Distant, 1890)
- Chinavia musiva (Berg, 1878)
- Chinavia napaea (Stål, 1872)
- Chinavia nigridorsata (Breddin, 1901)
- Chinavia nigropicta (Breddin, 1906)
- Chinavia obstinata (Stål, 1860)
- Chinavia occasi (Rolston, 1983)
- Chinavia occulta (Rolston, 1983)
- Chinavia pallidoconspersa (Stål, 1858)
- Chinavia panamensis (Distant, 1890)
- Chinavia panizzii (Frey-da-Silva & Grazia, 2001)
- Chinavia pecosa (Rolston, 1983)
- Chinavia pengue (Rolston, 1983)
- Chinavia pensylvanica (Gmelin, 1790)
- Chinavia plaumanni (Rolston, 1983)
- Chinavia pontagrossensis (Frey-da-Silva & Grazia, 2001)
- Chinavia punctatorugosa (Stål, 1858)
- Chinavia rideri (Frey-da-Silva & Grazia, 2001)
- Chinavia rinapsus (Dallas, 1851)
- Chinavia rogenhoferi (Stål, 1872)
- Chinavia runaspis (Dallas, 1851)
- Chinavia scutellata (Distant, 1890)
- Chinavia simplicis (Rolston, 1983)
- Chinavia solita (Rider & Rolston, 1986)
- Chinavia sparnium (Dallas, 1851)
- Chinavia spicata (Distant, 1913)
- Chinavia teretis (Rolston, 1983)
- Chinavia triangula (Rider & Rolston, 1986)
- Chinavia ubica (Rolston, 1983)
- Chinavia varicornis (Dallas, 1851)
- Chinavia viridans (Stål, 1859)
- Chinavia wygodzinskyi (Rolston, 1983)
