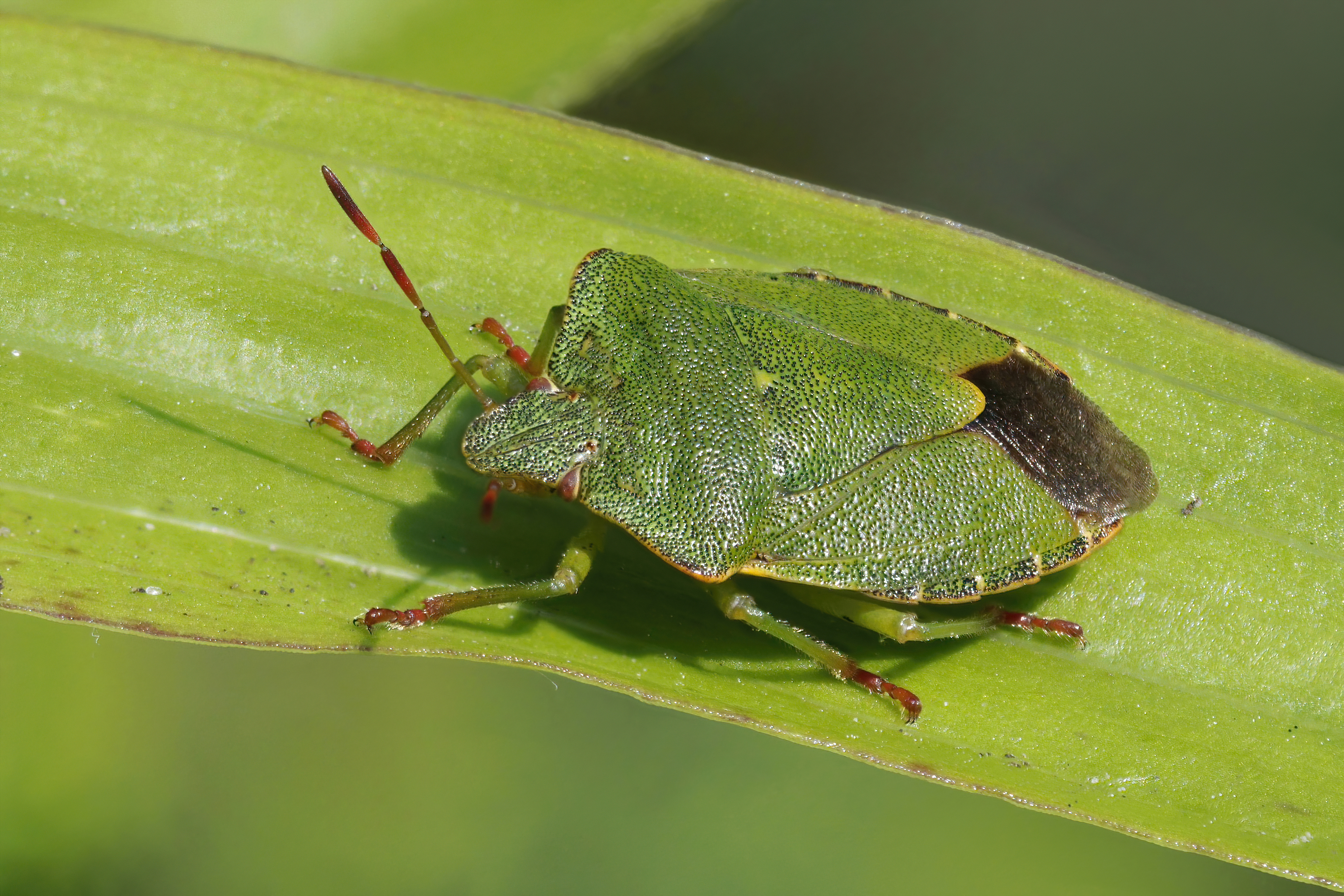
- Spring adult in Oxfordshire

Scientific classification
- Kingdom: Animalia
- Phylum: Arthropoda
- Clade: Pancrustacea
- Class: Insecta
- Order: Hemiptera
- Suborder: Heteroptera
- Family: Pentatomidae
- Genus: Palomena
- Species: P. prasina

Binomial name
- Palomena prasina (Linnaeus, 1761)

Synonyms
- Cimex prasinus Linnaeus, 1760; Palomena dissimile (Fabricius)

= Green shield bug =

Species of true bug

The green shield bug (Palomena prasina) is a Palearctic shield bug species in the family Pentatomidae. The name might equally apply to several other species in the tribe Nezarini, or if referred-to as a "green stink bug", it might more appropriately belong to the larger North American bug, Chinavia hilaris. The adult green shield bug ranges in the colour of their backs from bright green to bronze, without any substantial markings. Green shield bugs are a very common shield bug throughout Europe, including the British Isles and Ireland, and are found in a large variety of habitats, including gardens. They have been found as far north as 63° N latitude.

== Life cycle ==
In Europe, the bright green shield bugs appear in April or May, having hibernated as imagoes in humus during the winter. They live by eating the sap from within plants including crops such as apples, pears and hazelnuts. They fatten for a month and then mate in June.

The imago's coloration changes over the summer months from green to greenish browns even bronze to ready for the autumn, after which the life cycle will end.

Mating is back-to-back. The female lays her eggs in hexagonal batches of 25 to 30, and a single female will lay three to four batches. After the eggs hatch, the green shield bug enter a larval stage (which is really their first nymphal stage) where they remain together in sibling communities. This is made possible by the excretion of an aggregation pheromone. In case of danger, another pheromone is released which causes dispersal. The larval stage is followed by four more nymphal stages as well as moulting between each one.

The green shield bug displays different colouration during each nymphal stage, light brown, black or green-black, and in the final stage, the imago, is bright green with short wings. Usually the imago stage is reached in September, with hibernation occurring in November.

=== Gallery ===
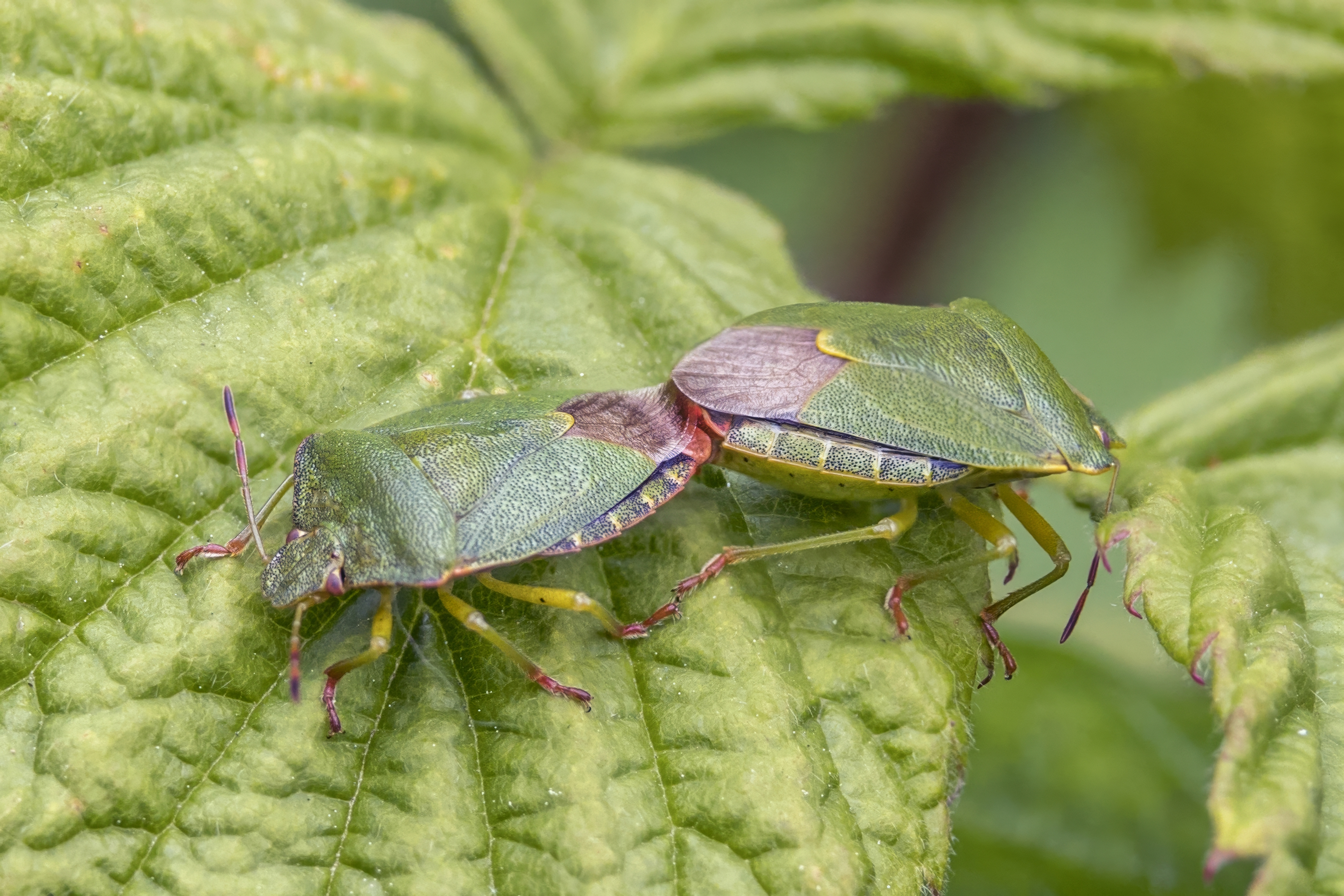
mating

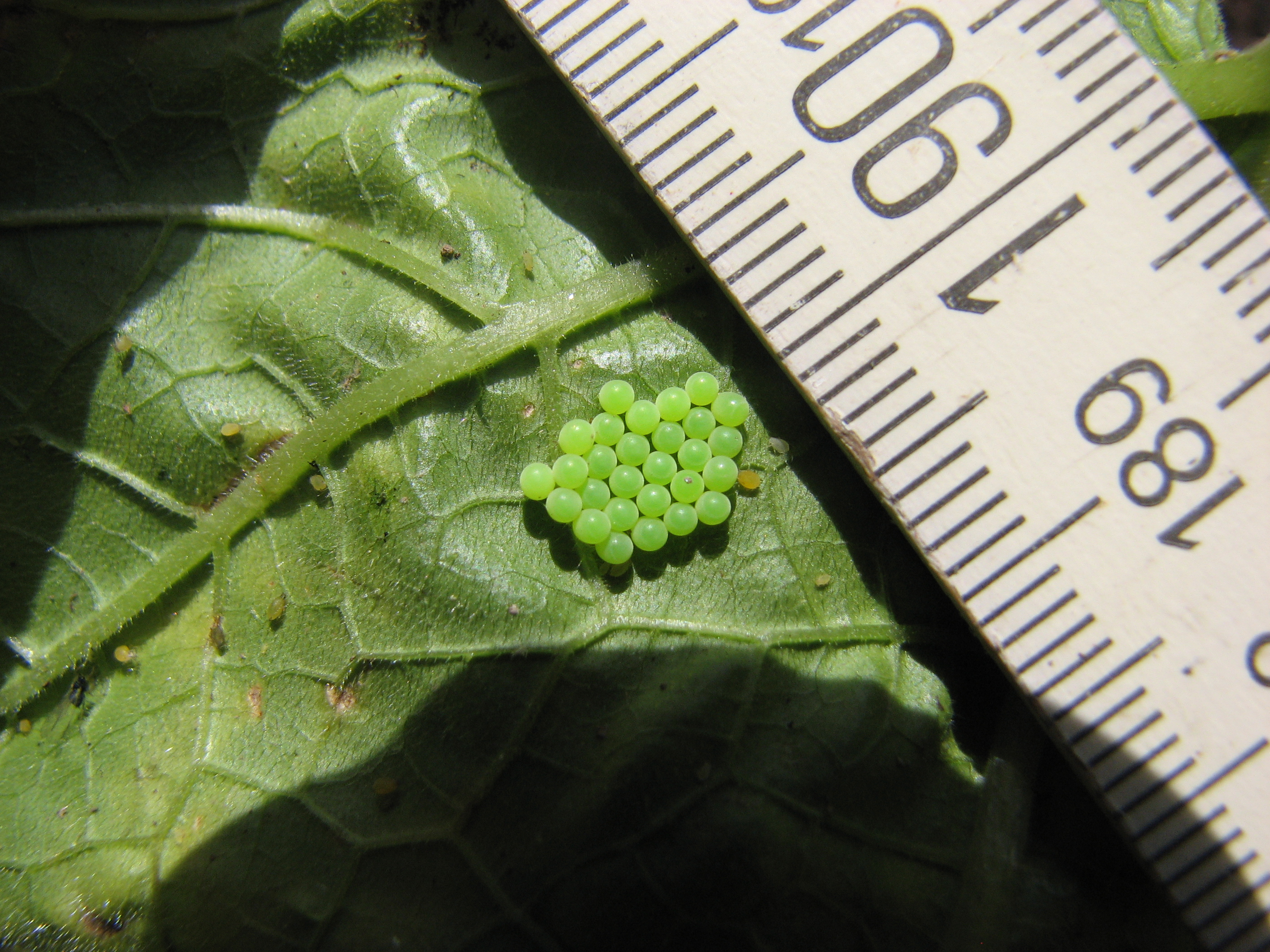
Egg mass

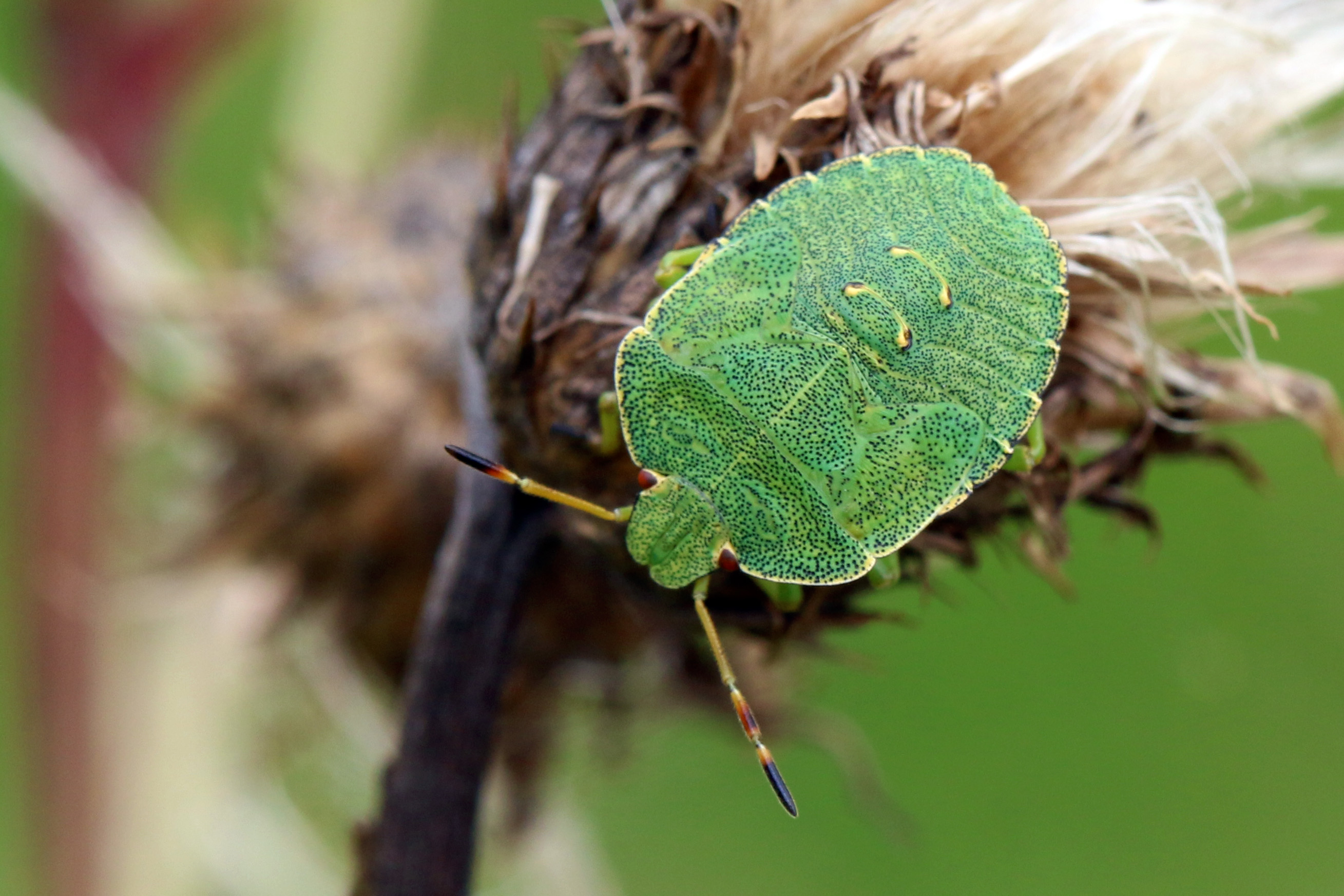
4th instar nymph

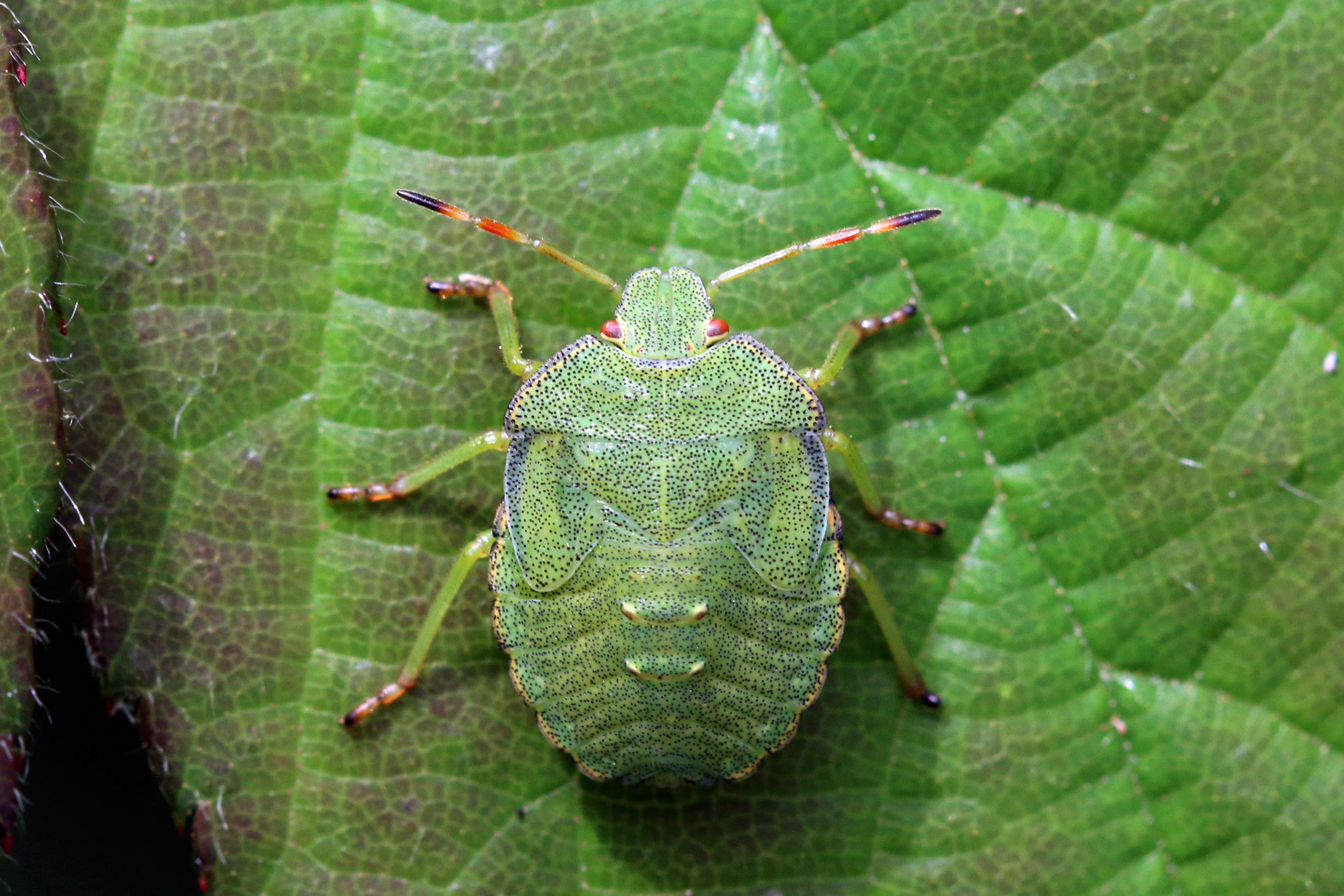
5th instar nymph

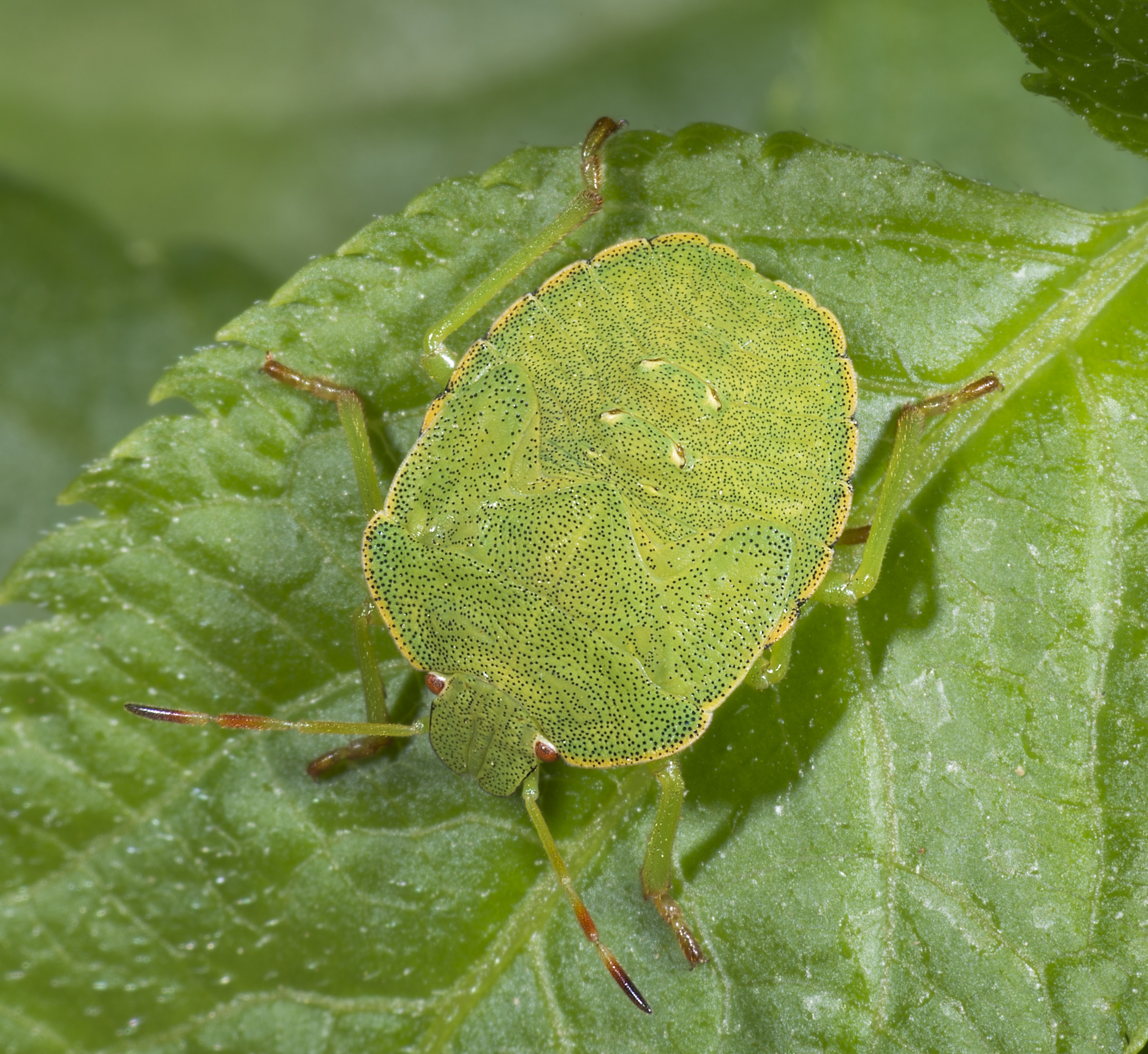
Final-stage nymph

Green shield bug. Microscope Lumam P-8
