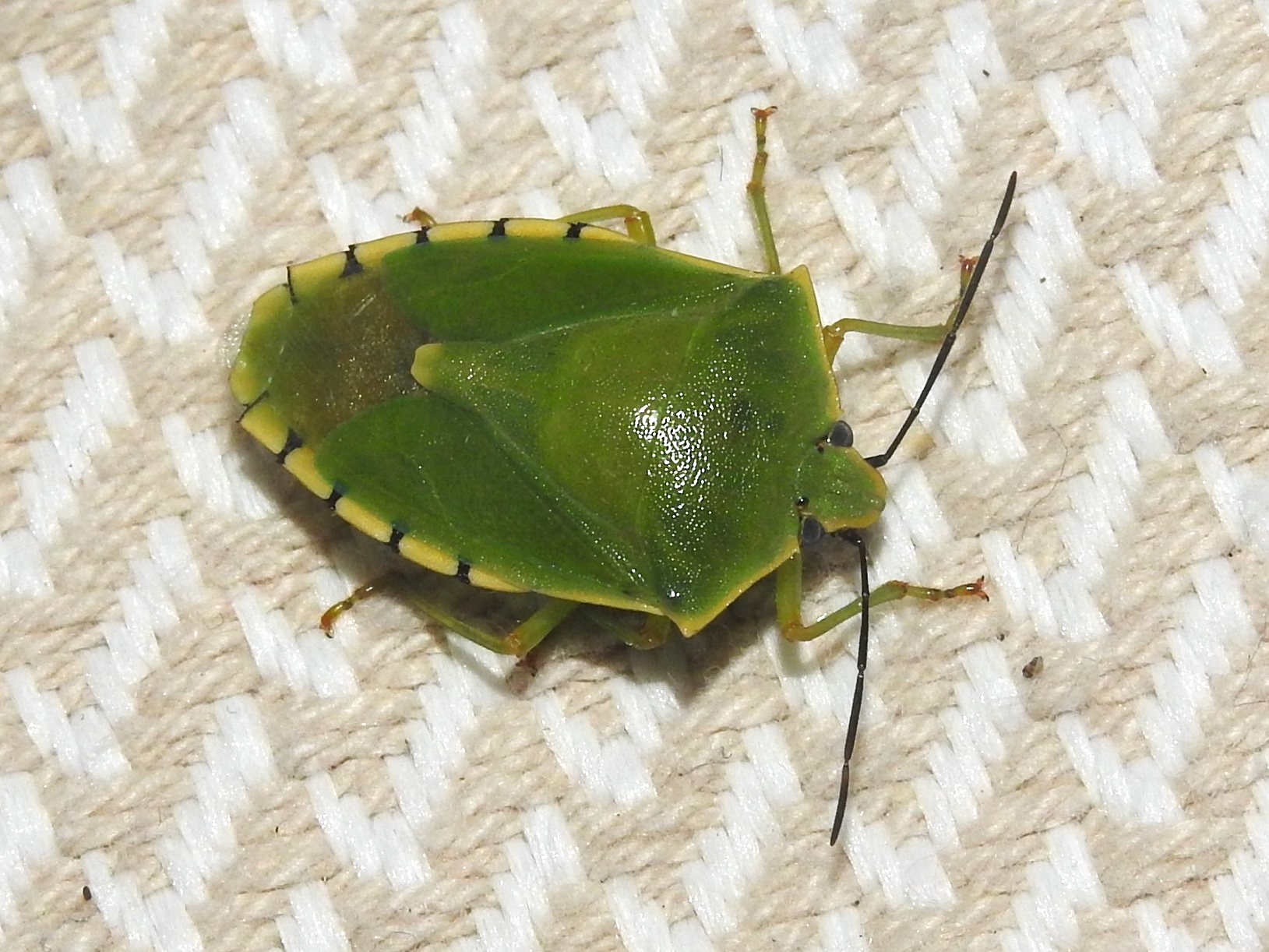
- In the Dominican Republic

Scientific classification
- Kingdom: Animalia
- Phylum: Arthropoda
- Clade: Pancrustacea
- Class: Insecta
- Order: Hemiptera
- Suborder: Heteroptera
- Family: Pentatomidae
- Subfamily: Pentatominae
- Tribe: Nezarini
- Genus: Chinavia
- Species: C. marginata

Binomial name
- Chinavia marginata (Palisot de Beauvois, 1817)

Synonyms
- Acrosternum marginatum (Palisot de Beauvois, 1817); Nezara marginata (Palisot de Beauvois, 1817); Pentatoma marginata Palisot de Beauvois, 1817

= Chinavia marginata =

Species of shield bug

Chinavia marginata is a species of stink bug in the family Pentatomidae. It is native to Florida, Central America, and the Caribbean.

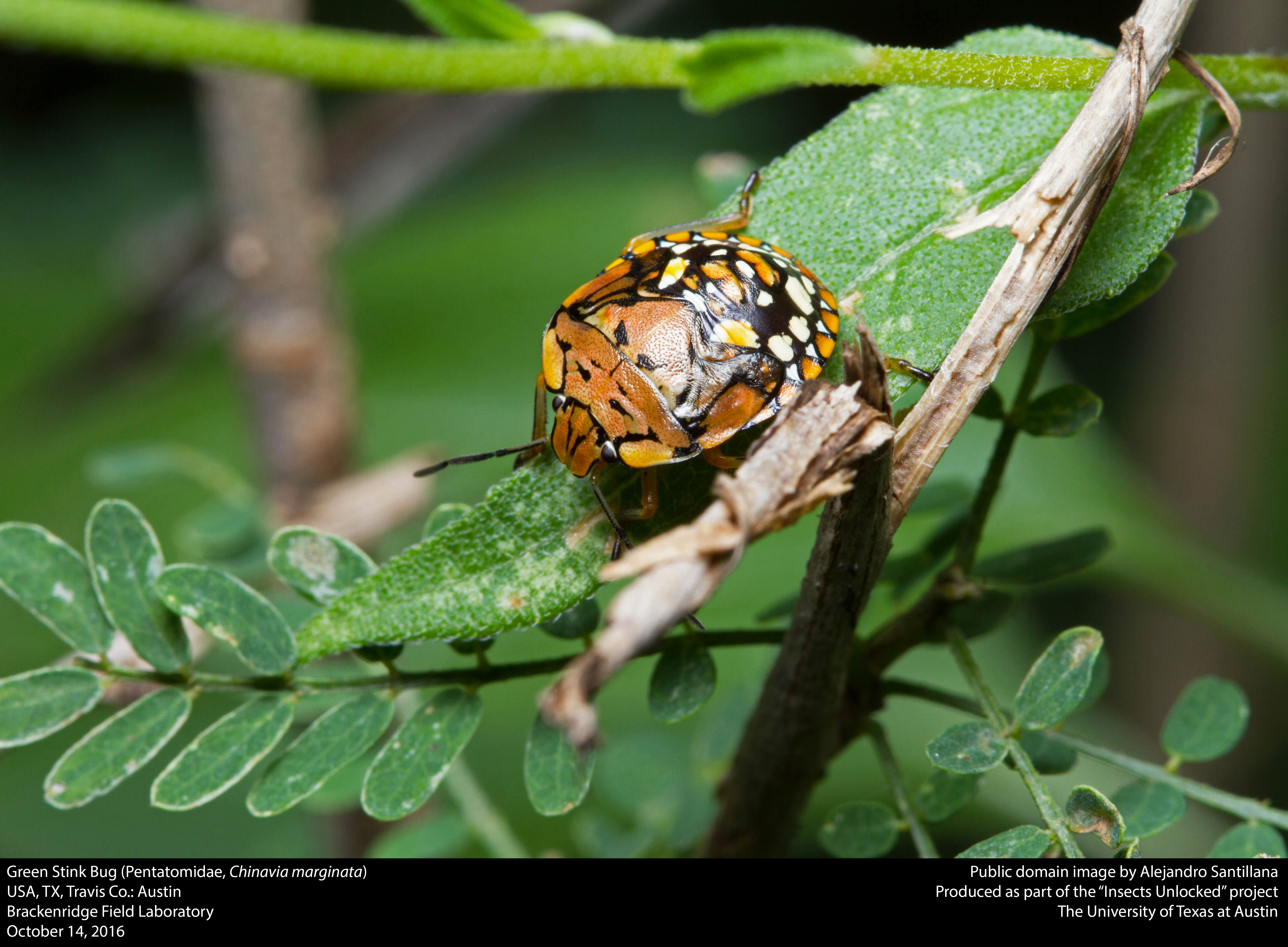
Chinavia marginata
