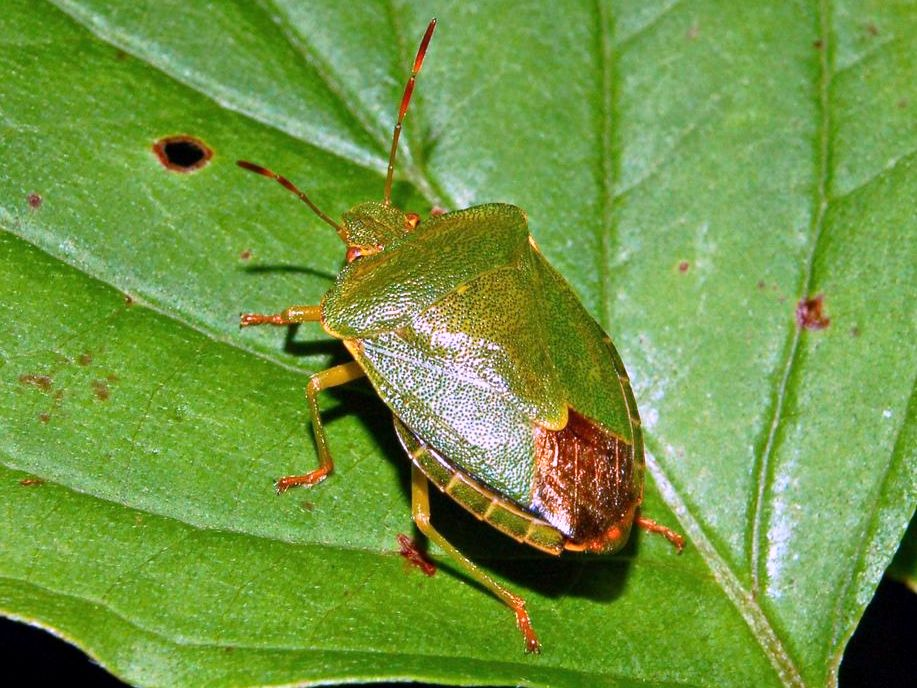
- Palomena prasina

Scientific classification
- Domain: Eukaryota
- Kingdom: Animalia
- Phylum: Arthropoda
- Class: Insecta
- Order: Hemiptera
- Suborder: Heteroptera
- Superfamily: Pentatomoidea
- Family: Pentatomidae
- Subfamily: Pentatominae
- Tribe: Nezarini
- Genus: Palomena; Mulsant & Rey, 1866

= Palomena =

Genus of true bugs

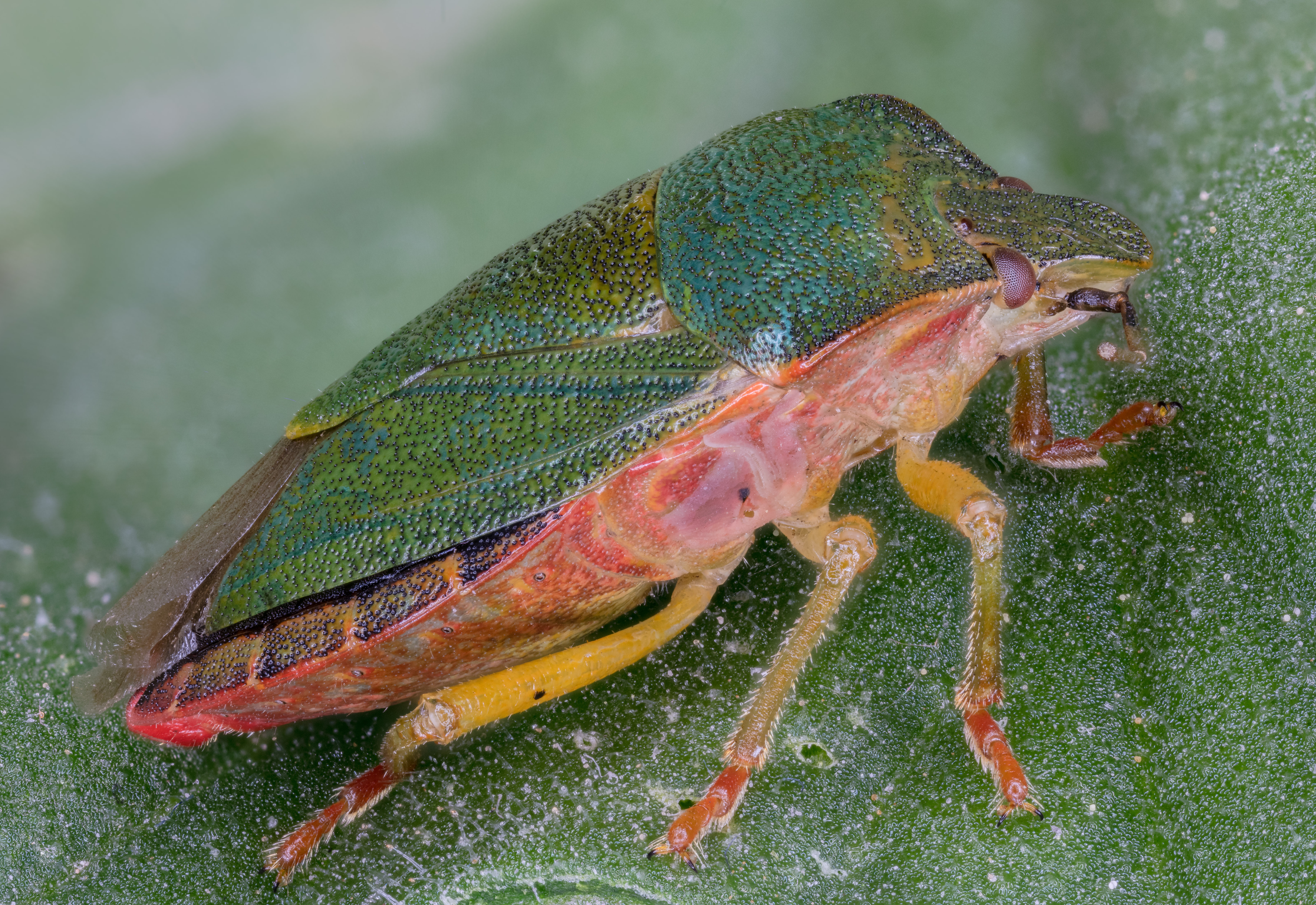
Macro shot

Palomena is a genus of shield bugs of the family Pentatomidae and tribe Nezarini. This species is found in Europe and Asia.

== Species ==
Species within this genus include:

- Palomena angulata (Puton, 1871)
- Palomena angulosa (Motschulsky, 1861)
- Palomena assamensis Zheng & Ling, 1989
- Palomena balakotensis Zaidi & Ahmad, 1991
- Palomena chapana (Distant, 1921)
- Palomena formosa Vidal, 1939
- Palomena hsiaoi Zheng & Ling, 1989
- Palomena hunanensis Lin & Zhang, 1992
- Palomena indica Zheng & Ling, 1989
- Palomena limbata Jakovlev, 1904
- Palomena mursili Linnavuori, 1984
- Palomena prasina (Linnaeus, 1761)
- Palomena reuteri Distant, 1879
- Palomena rubricornis Scott, 1874
- Palomena serresi Meunier, 1915 †
- Palomena similis Zheng & Ling, 1989
- Palomena spinosa Distant, 1880
- Palomena tibetana Zheng & Ling, 1989
- Palomena unicolorella Kirkaldy, 1909
- Palomena viridissima (Poda, 1761)
