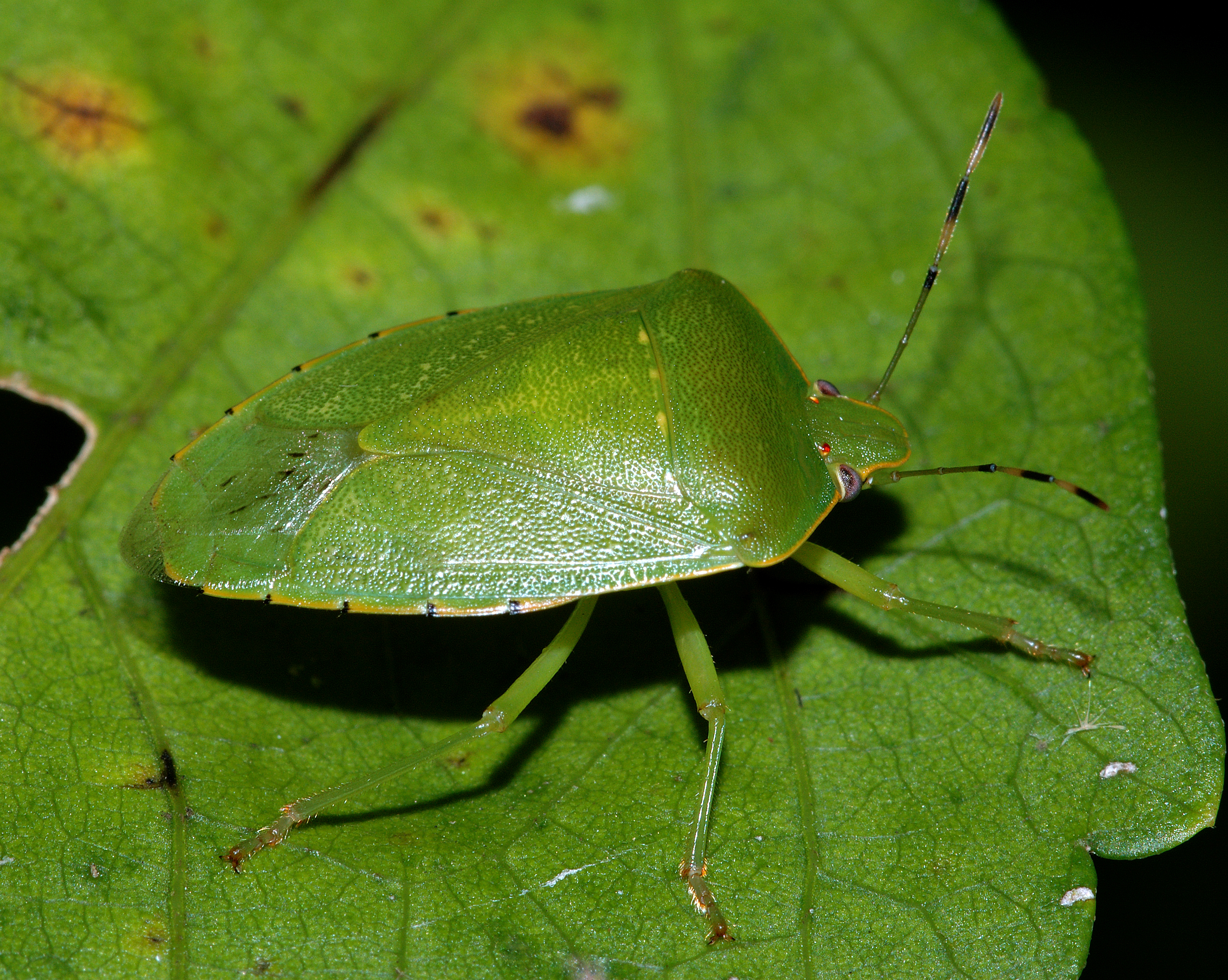

Scientific classification
- Kingdom: Animalia
- Phylum: Arthropoda
- Clade: Pancrustacea
- Class: Insecta
- Order: Hemiptera
- Suborder: Heteroptera
- Family: Pentatomidae
- Genus: Chinavia
- Species: C. hilaris

Binomial name
- Chinavia hilaris Say, 1832

Synonyms
- Pentatoma hilaris; Nezara hilaris; Acrosternum hilare; Acrosternum hilaris; Chinavia hilare

= Green stink bug =

Species of true bug

The green stink bug or green soldier bug (Chinavia hilaris) is a stink bug of the family Pentatomidae.

== Taxonomy ==
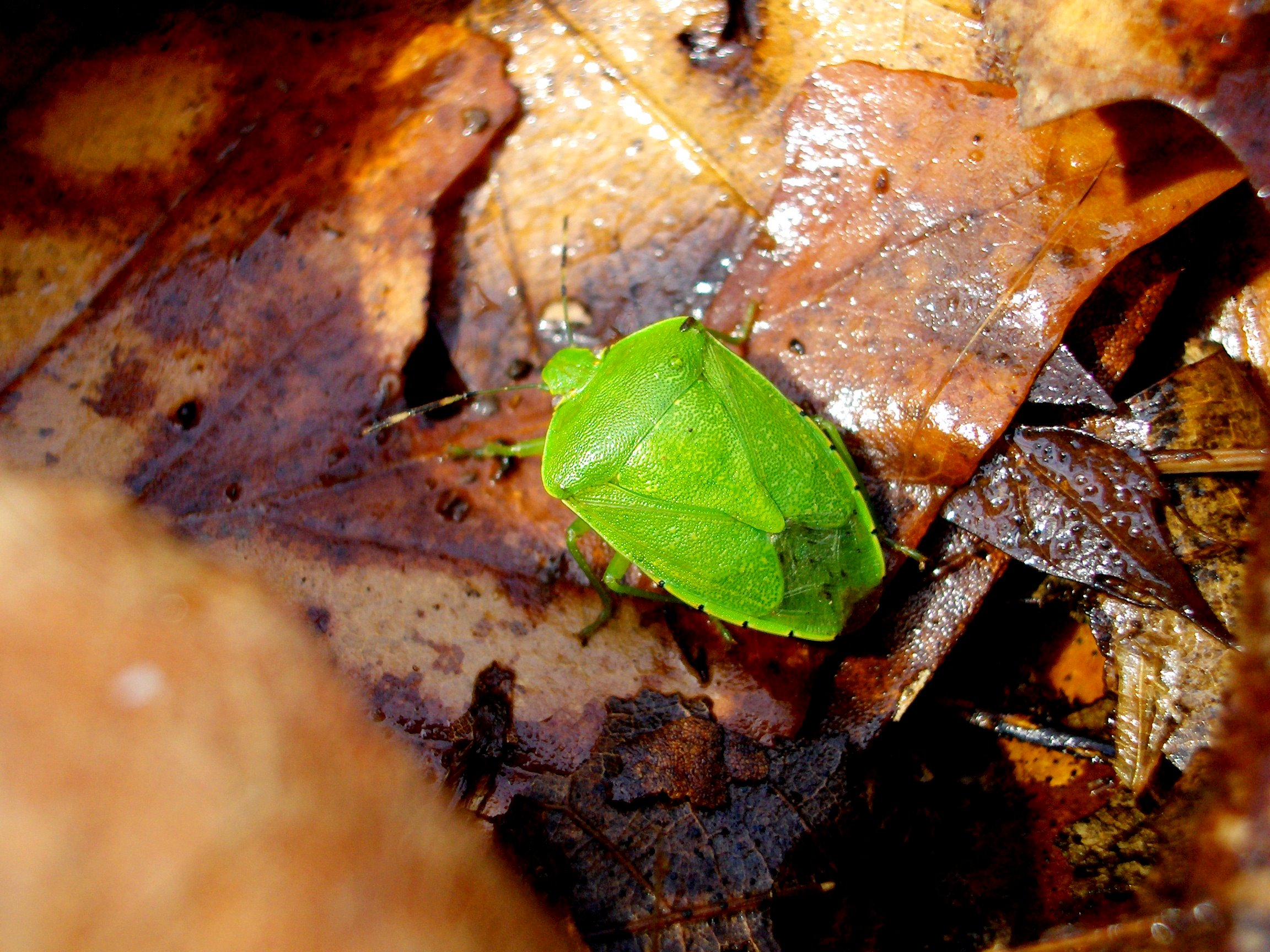
Green stink bug

The species was previously placed in the genus Acrosternum but has been classified in the genus Chinavia in the more recent literature (e.g., Schwertner and Grazia, 2006). However, the Entomological Society of America has not officially recognized this change despite this shift in scientific naming.

== Description ==
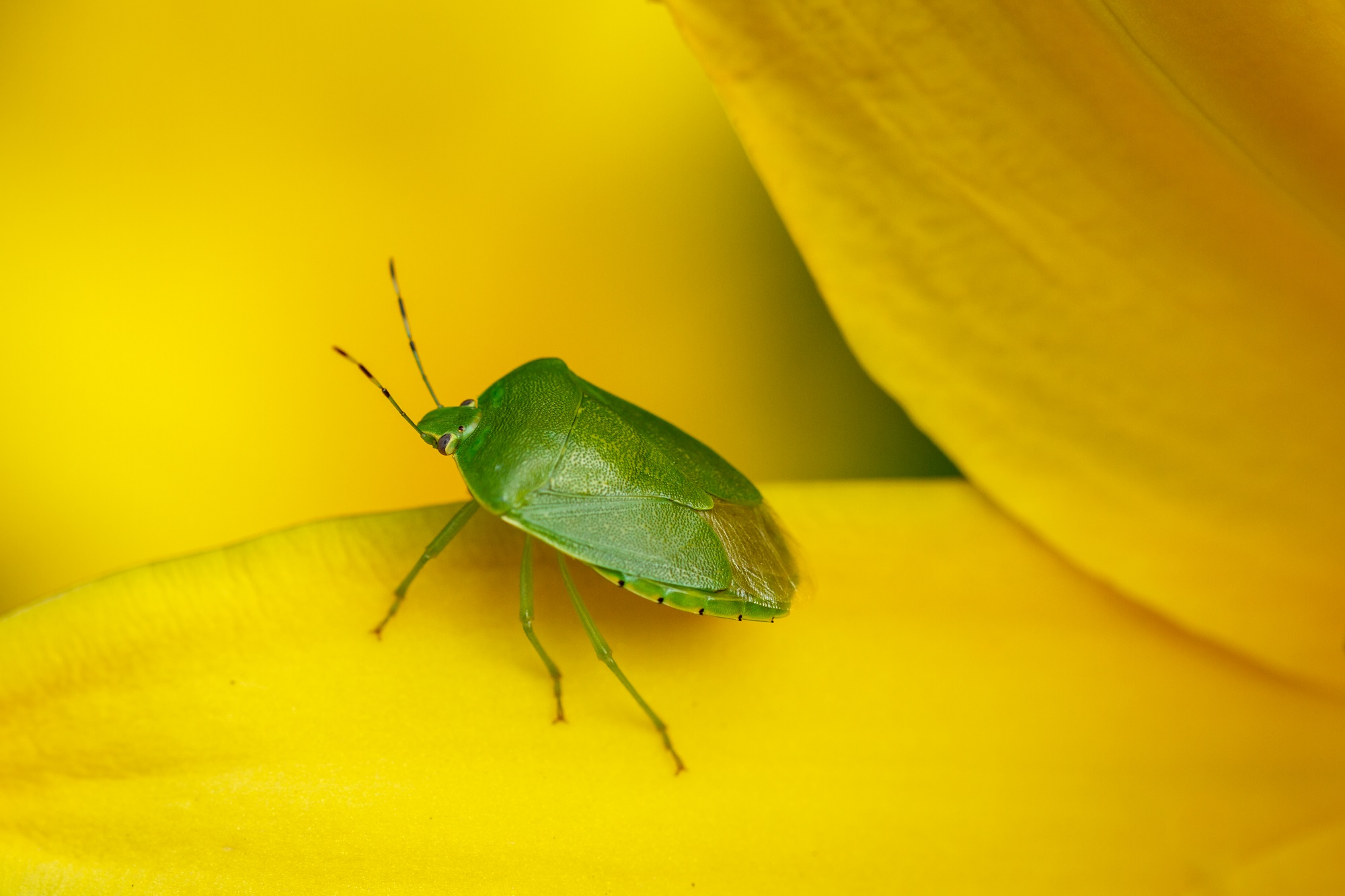
Green stink bug on a lily

The green stink bug's color is typically bright green, with narrow yellow, orange, or reddish edges. It is a large, shield-shaped bug with an elongate, oval form and a length between 13 and 18 mm. It can be differentiated from the species Nezara viridula by its black outermost three antennal segments. Its anterolateral (= in front and away from the middle) pronotal margin is rather straight and not strongly arced, such as in Chinavia pensylvanica. Both adults and nymphs have large stink glands on the underside of the thorax, extending more than halfway to the edge of the metapleuron. They discharge large amounts of this foul-smelling liquid when disturbed. This liquid, dried and pulverized, was once used at an industrial level to reinforce the smell of some acids. Now it's been replaced by artificial composites.

== Habitat ==
This species is found in orchards, gardens, woodlands, and crop fields throughout North America, feeding with its needle-like mouthparts on the juices of a wide variety of plants from May until frost. Their range spans from the eastern United States, from New England to Florida, to the 98 degree west longitudinal line; they are also seldom found anywhere west of this boundary, though are found moderately along the west coast, from San Diego, California to Seattle, Washington. Adults develop a preference for developing seeds and thus become crop pests (tomato, bean, pea, cotton, soybean, eggplant). When no seeds are present, they also feed on stems and foliage, thus damaging several fruit trees, such as the apple, cherry, orange, and peach trees.

Green stink bugs frequent non-crop hosts more than other stink bug species earlier in the season. Plants such as black cherry, elderberry, mimosa, and pecan exist as farmscape edges, which provide immature organisms a safe location to develop and a gateway to agricultural fields. Unlike cotton, peanuts and corn are not considered host crops, and the latter has been shown to slow dispersion of green stink bugs to nearby host crops due to its tall field edges.

== Life cycle ==
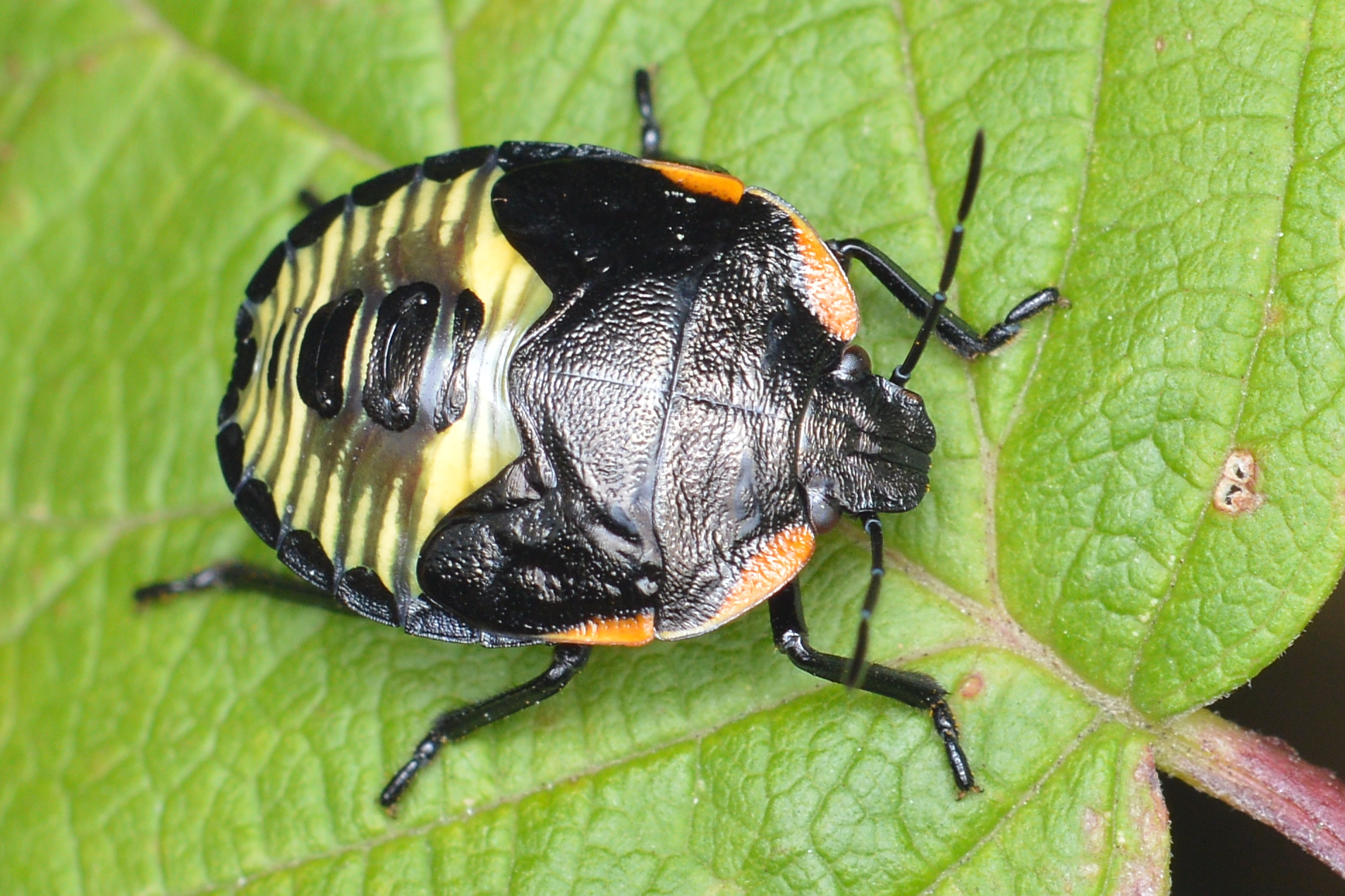
Nymph, early instar

Adults appear in the field in early September and become plentiful in sheltered positions. Then, mating happens in early October, and finally, the eggs can be found mid-to-late October. Nymphs appear in late October and early November. Two or three generations occur in the summer months in the field and in the laboratory at 26 °C.

== Reproduction ==
The adult females attach their keg-shaped eggs to the underside of foliage in double rows of twelve eggs or more. These clusters appear almost cylindrical, and they transition from light green to yellow to light pink as organisms approach hatching. Time from egg deposition to hatch decreases with rises in temperature. The green stink bug produces one generation in the North and two generations in the South. The early instar nymphs are rather brightly colored and striped, turning green when approaching adulthood. The eggs are usually laid in clusters of 14 (some clusters contain fewer eggs, with 9 being the smallest number recorded out of 77 observations). The eggs are laid either on the undersides of leaves or on the stems of plants, or on the flowers of salvia.

== Agricultural impact ==
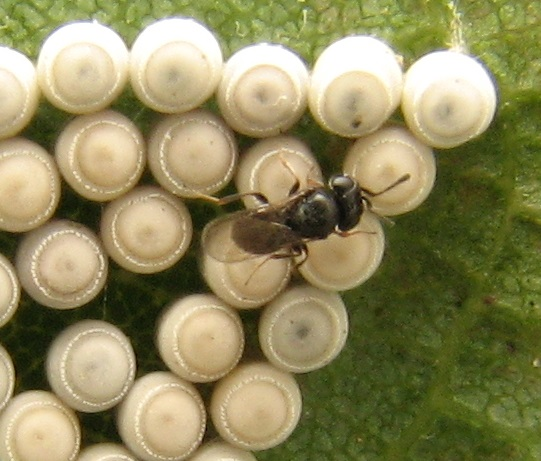
Eggs parasitized by Trissolcus sp. wasp

The green stink bug is considered a pest of economic importance in the United States. Crops are considered damaged when plant tissue is split by the feeding stylet. Adults administer most damage; effects can include catfishing (the misshaping of plant tissue, creating rough and corky edges) in peaches, internal warts and stained lint within cotton, green stem syndrome in soybeans and white spongy areas on tomatoes. Any dimples or scars on fruit are most likely administered by nymphs. Occasionally, the laying of eggs on grapes causes said nymphs to deplete the juices from the growing fruits.

== Pest management ==
This stink bug species is parasitized by the tachinid fly Trichopoda pennipes and by parasitic wasps.

The green stink bug uses the pheromone methyl (E,Z,Z)-2,4,6-decatrienoate in its communication system, and this may attract the bug away from crop fields.

== See also ==
- Shield bug
- Pentatomidae
