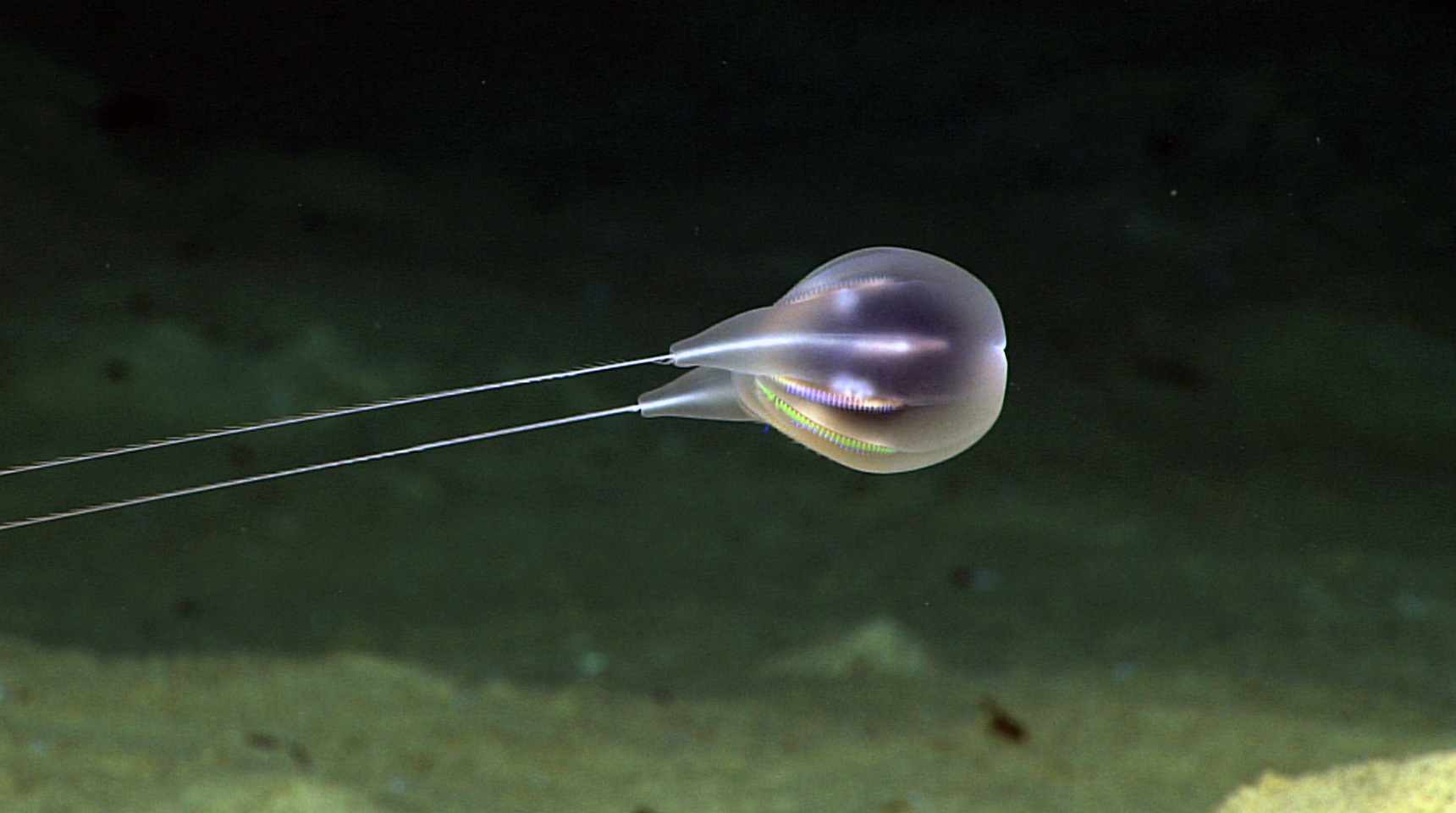
- Duobrachium sparksae, imaged in a submarine canyon northwest of Puerto Rico on April 10, 2015.

Scientific classification
- Kingdom: Animalia
- Phylum: Ctenophora
- Class: Tentaculata
- Order: Cydippida
- Genus: Duobrachium
- Species: D. sparksae

Binomial name
- Duobrachium sparksae Ford, Bezio & Collins, 2020

= Duobrachium =

Species of comb jelly

Discovery footage of Duobrachium sparksae, April 10, 2015.

Duobrachium is a monotypic genus of comb jellies (Ctenophora) belonging to the order Cydippida, family unknown. The only known species is Duobrachium sparksae.

== Discovery ==
During Océano Profundo 2015 ("Deep Ocean 2015"), an expedition to explore seamounts, oceanic trenches, and submarine troughs off Puerto Rico, shore-based scientists of the National Oceanic and Atmospheric Administration's (NOAA's) National Marine Fisheries Service using the remotely operated undersea vehicle Deep Discoverer deployed from the research ship NOAAS Okeanos Explorer captured video footage of three specimens of Duobrachium sparksae, a previously unknown species of comb jelly (Ctenophora), on April 10, 2015. Deep Discoverer filmed the specimens moving just above the sea floor in the Arecibo Amphitheater inside the Guajataca Canyon north-northwest of Puerto Rico at a depth of 3,910 metres (12,828 ft). With the gathering of specimens impractical during the observation, the scientists identified the specimens as belonging to a previously unidentified species based only on video footage, the first time NOAA scientists exclusively used high-definition video to describe and annotate a previously unknown creature.

The NOAA scientists announced the discovery of Duobrachium sparksae in November 2020. Although the identification of new species based on imagery alone had been controversial in the past, the NOAA scientists used a new virtual method of describing and documenting the discovery and received little criticism of their techniques or of the discovery itself. The 2015 imagery captured by Deep Discoverer became the "type material," or "specimens," upon which the description and name of the species are based. The videos became part of the Smithsonian Institution's National Museum of Natural History Collection and are accessible to the public.

== Physical characteristics ==
The animal has a rectangular shape when viewed in the tentacular plane, but oval from the perpendicular plane. It has two long tentacle arms which protrude from the centre of the sides of the body, and extend downwards. These are about a third as long as the body. These arms encase retractable tentacles which are approximately 30 to 56 centimetres (12 to 22 in) long.

== Behavior and distribution ==
Scientists observed Duobrachium sparksae maintaining a specific height above the sea floor and moving like a hot air balloon with two lines dangling to the sea floor below. They did not observe any of the specimens directly attaching themselves to the sea floor with their long tentacles, but video footage suggests the organism touches the sea floor with its tentacles as it moves, and it is possible the animals use their tentacles to adhere to the seafloor.

As of the announcement of the discovery of Duobrachium sparksae in November 2020, its role in the ecosystem remained unknown. Its discoverers hypothesized at the time that it could play a role similar to that of other comb jellies (ctenophores) near the ocean floor, although it also has some similarities to comb jellies found in the open ocean.

In April 2015, within days of first observing Duobrachium sparksae, its discoverers noted that a similar animal had been seen during a remotely operated underwater vehicle dive over the Mid-Atlantic Ridge in 2010. As of November 2020, however, the distribution of Duobrachium sparksae within or beyond the Arecibo Amphitheater inside the Guajataca Canyon was unknown, although its discoverers noted that they observed three specimens in a fairly small area on April 10, 2015, suggesting that Duobrachium sparksae is "not extremely rare."

== Taxonomic classification ==
In announcing their identification of Duobrachium sparksae, its discoverers described it as easily distinguishable from all other known species of comb jelly and suggested that it could be classified within the order Cydippida, which they described as a "problematic and non-monophyletic order." However, they noted that while "its robust tentacle arms are more reminiscent of benthic species of [the order] Platyctenida, particularly those of the families Lyroctenidae and Ctenoplanidae," it possesses ctene rows — fused cilia used for locomotion — unlike most platyctenid comb jellies in their adult form. Its retention of ctene rows in adulthood is more reminiscent of the comb jellies of the family Ctenoplanidae, allowing a limited ability to swim. This led the discoverers of Duobrachium sparksae to hypothesize that it could represent a lineage that diverged from other comb jellies near the origin of the order Platyctenida.
