= Coeloplana fishelsoni =

Scientific classification
- Domain: Eukaryota
- Kingdom: Animalia
- Phylum: Ctenophora
- Class: Tentaculata
- Order: Platyctenida
- Family: Coeloplanidae
- Genus: Coeloplana
- Species: C. fishelsoni

Binomial name
- Coeloplana fishelsoni Alamaru, Brokovich & Loya, 2015

Species of ctenophore

Coeloplana fishelsoni is a species of benthic comb jelly. It is known from the Red Sea and lives as an episymbiont on colonies of Xenia umbellata and Paralemnalia species. It can be differentiated from its congeneric species by their host, colour, and colour pattern.
