= Sequential hermaphroditism =

Sex change as part of the normal life cycle of a species

Sequential hermaphroditism (called dichogamy in botany) is one of the two types of hermaphroditism, the other type being simultaneous hermaphroditism. It occurs when the organism's sex changes at some point in its life. A sequential hermaphrodite produces eggs (female gametes) and sperm (male gametes) at different stages in life. Sequential hermaphroditism occurs in many fish, gastropods, and plants. Species that can undergo these changes do so as a normal event within their reproductive cycle, usually cued by either social structure or the achievement of a certain age or size.

In animals, the different types of change are male to female (protandry or protandrous hermaphroditism), female to male (protogyny or protogynous hermaphroditism), and bidirectional (serial or bidirectional hermaphroditism). Both protogynous and protandrous hermaphroditism allow the organism to switch between functional male and functional female. Bidirectional hermaphrodites have the capacity for sex change in either direction between male and female or female and male, potentially repeatedly during their lifetime. These various types of sequential hermaphroditism may indicate that there is no advantage based on the original sex of an individual organism. Those that change gonadal sex can have both female and male germ cells in the gonads or can change from one complete gonadal type to the other during their last life stage.

In plants, individual flowers are called dichogamous if their function has the two sexes separated in time, although the plant as a whole may have functionally male and functionally female flowers open at any one moment. A flower is protogynous if its function is first female, then male, and protandrous if its function is first male then female. It used to be thought that this reduced inbreeding, but it may be a more general mechanism for reducing pollen-pistil interference.

== Zoology ==
Hermaphroditic fishes are almost exclusively sequential—simultaneous hermaphroditism is only known to occur in a few fishes, such as the Rivulid killifish Kryptolebias marmoratus and hamlets. Teleost fishes are the only vertebrate lineage where sequential hermaphroditism occurs.

=== Protandry ===
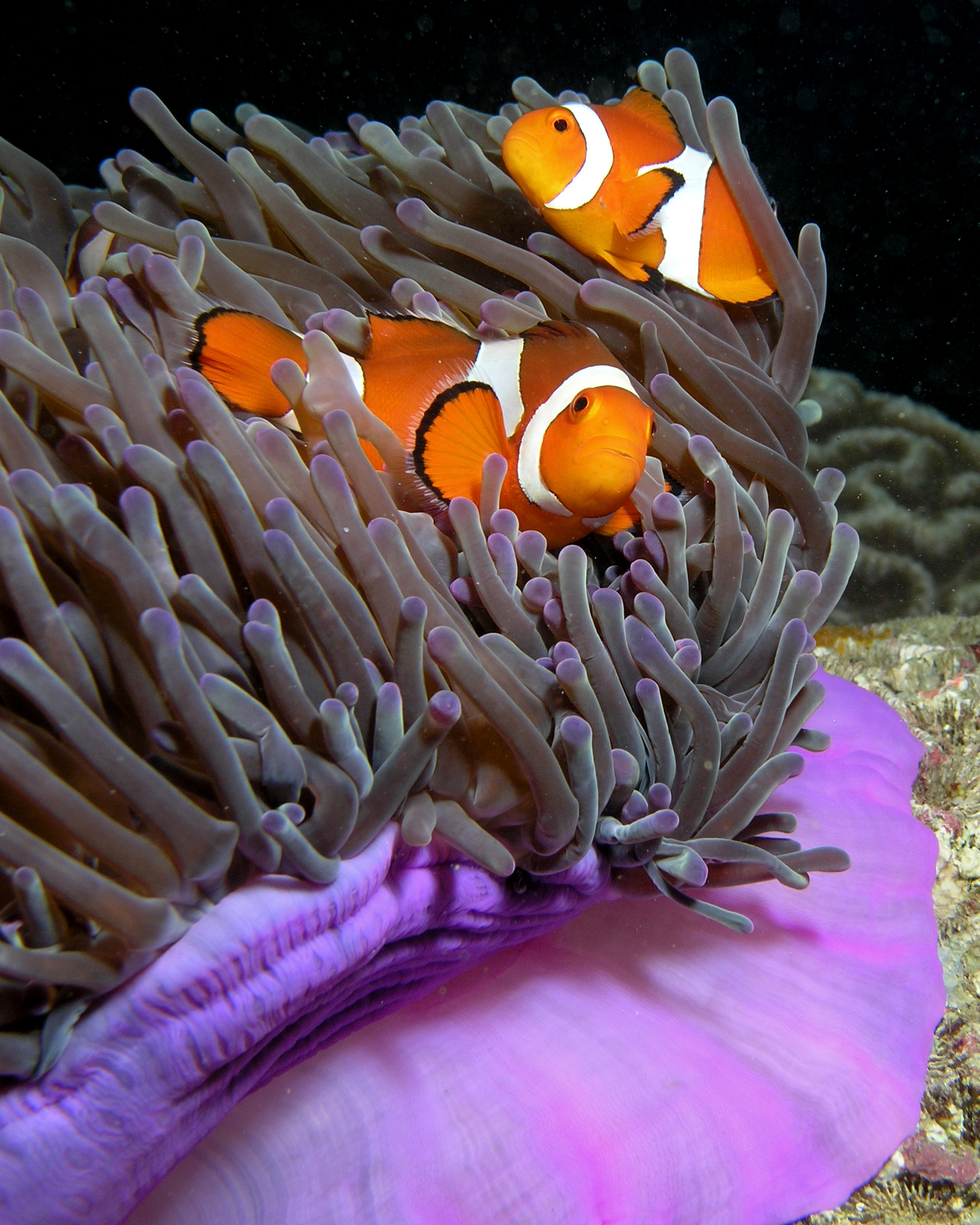
Ocellaris clownfish, Amphiprion ocellaris, a protandrous sequential animal species

In general, protandrous hermaphrodites are animals that develop as males, but can later reproduce as females. However, protandry features a spectrum of different forms, which are characterized by the overlap between male and female reproductive function throughout an organism's lifetime:

1. Protandrous sequential hermaphroditism: Early reproduction as a pure male and later reproduction as a pure female.
2. Protandrous hermaphroditism with overlap: Early reproduction as a pure male and later reproduction as a pure female with an intervening overlap between both male and female reproduction.
3. Protandrous simultaneous hermaphroditism: Early pure male reproduction and later reproduction in both sexes.

Furthermore, there are also species that reproduce as both sexes throughout their lifespans (i.e simultaneous hermaphrodites), but shift their reproductive resources from male to female over time.

==== Protandrous examples ====
Protandry occurs in a widespread range of animal phyla. In fact, protandrous hermaphroditism occurs in many fish, mollusks, and crustaceans, but is completely absent in terrestrial vertebrates.

A common example of a protandrous species are clownfish, which have a very structured society. In the species Amphiprion percula, there are zero to four individuals excluded from breeding and a breeding pair living in a sea anemone. Dominance is based on size, the female being the largest and the reproductive male being the second largest. The rest of the group is made up of progressively smaller males that do not breed and have no functioning gonads. If the female dies, in many cases, the reproductive male gains weight and becomes the female for that group. The largest non-breeding male then sexually matures and becomes the reproductive male for the group.

The ribbon eel also goes through a protandrous life cycle. Other protandrous fishes include teleost species in the families Pomacentridae, Sparidae, and Gobiidae, and in the orders Clupeiformes, Siluriformes, and Stomiiformes. Since these groups are distantly related and have many intermediate relatives that are not protandrous, it strongly suggests that protandry evolved multiple times.

Phylogenies support this assumption because ancestral states differ for each family. For example, the ancestral state of the family Pomacentridae was gonochoristic (single-sexed), indicating that protandry evolved within the family. Therefore, because other families also contain protandrous species, protandry likely has evolved multiple times.

Other examples of protandrous animals include:

- The Platyctenida order of comb jellies. Unlike most ctenophores, which are simultaneous hermaphrodites, Platyctenida are primarily protandrous, but asexual reproduction has also been observed in some species.
- The flatworms Hymanella retenuova.
- Laevapex fuscus, a gastropod, is described as being functionally protandric. The sperm matures in late winter and early spring, the eggs mature in early summer, and copulation occurs only in June. This shows that males cannot reproduce until the females appear, thus why they are considered to be functionally protandric.
- Members of the shrimp genus Lysmata perform protandric simultaneous hermaphroditism where they become true hermaphrodites instead of females. During the "female phase", they have both male and female tissues in their gonads and produce both gametes.
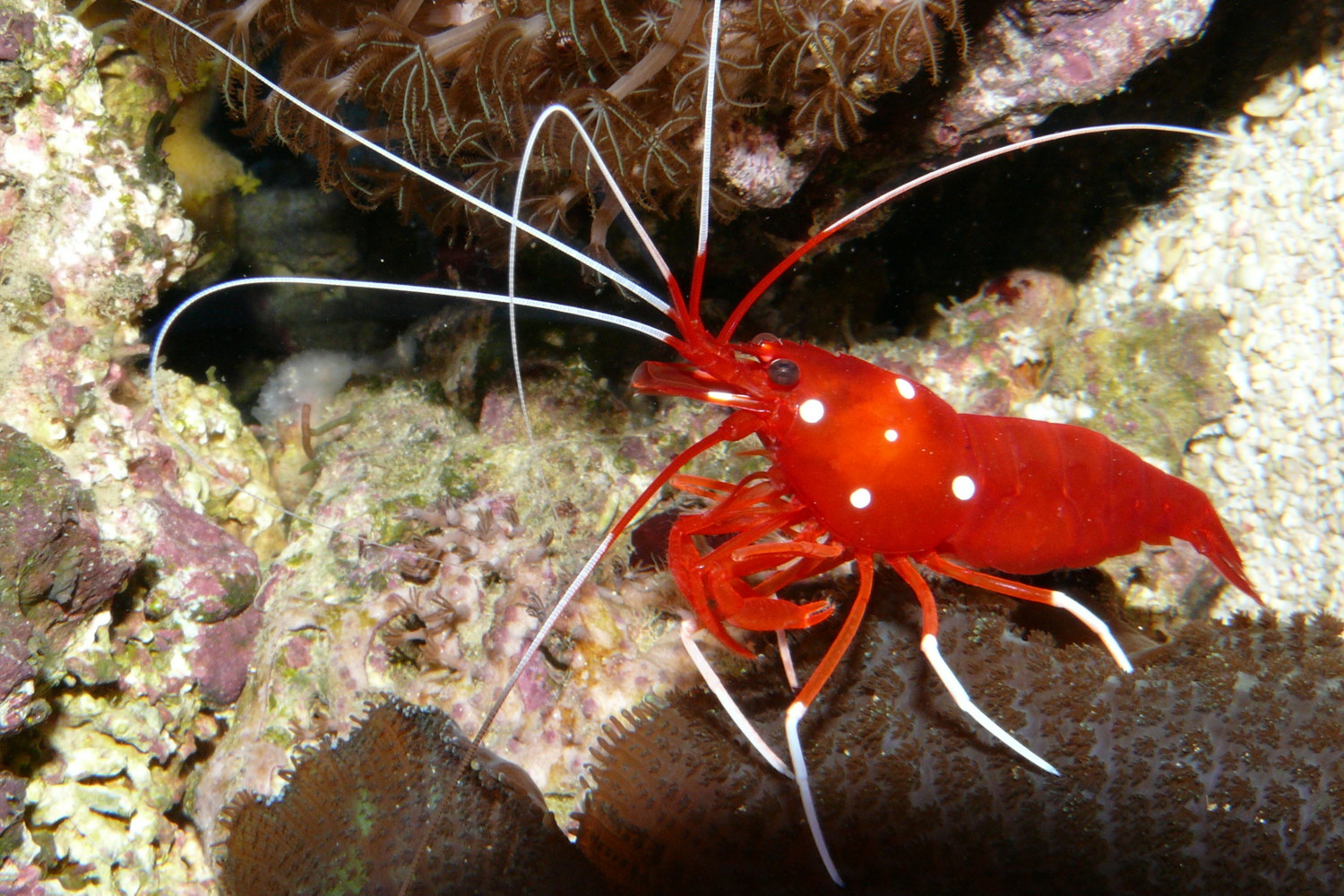
  Lysmata, a genus of shrimp that performs protandric simultaneous hermaphroditism

=== Protogyny ===
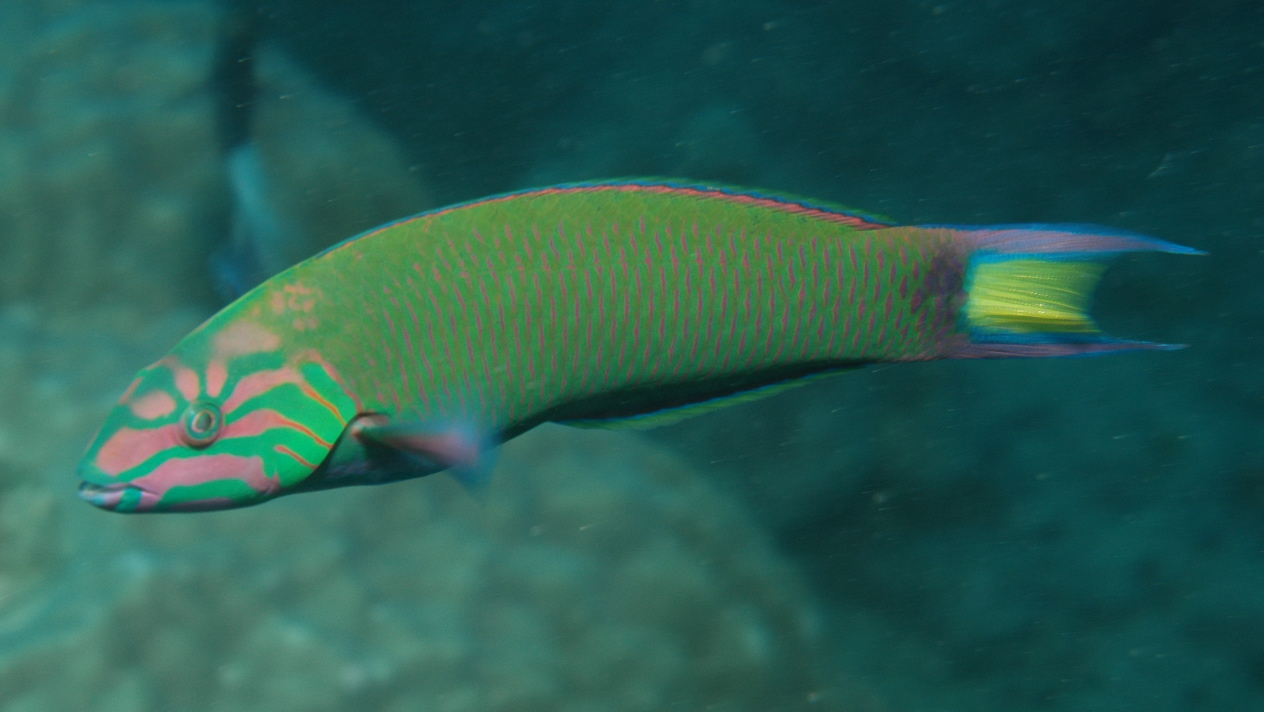
Moon wrasse, Thalassoma lunare, a protogynous animal species

Protogynous hermaphrodites are animals that are born female and at some point in their lifespan change sex to male. Protogyny is a more common form of sequential hermaphroditism in fish, especially when compared to protandry. As the animal ages, it shifts sex to become a male animal due to internal or external triggers, undergoing physiological and behavioral changes. In many fishes, female fecundity increases continuously with age, while in other species larger males have a selective advantage (such as in harems), so it is hypothesized that the mating system can determine whether it is more selectively advantageous to be a male or female when an organism's body is larger.

==== Protogynous examples ====
Protogyny is the most common form of hermaphroditism in fish in nature. About 75% of the 500 known sequentially hermaphroditic fish species are protogynous and often have polygynous mating systems. In these systems, large males use aggressive territorial defense to dominate female mating. This causes small males to have a severe reproductive disadvantage, which promotes strong selection of size-based protogyny. Therefore, if an individual is small, it is more reproductively advantageous to be female because they will still be able to reproduce, unlike small males.

Common model organisms for this type of sequential hermaphroditism are wrasses. They are one of the largest families of coral reef fish and belong to the family Labridae. Wrasses are found around the world in all marine habitats and tend to bury themselves in sand at night or when they feel threatened. In wrasses, the larger of a mating pair is the male, while the smaller is the female. In most cases, females and immature males have a uniform color while the male has the terminal bicolored phase. Large males hold territories and try to pair spawn, while small to mid-size initial-phase males live with females and group spawn. In other words, both the initial- and terminal-phase males can breed, but they differ in the way they do it.

In the California sheephead (Semicossyphus pulcher), a type of wrasse, when the female changes to male, the ovaries degenerate and spermatogenic crypts appear in the gonads. The general structure of the gonads remains ovarian after the transformation and the sperm is transported through a series of ducts on the periphery of the gonad and oviduct. Here, sex change is age-dependent. For example, the California sheephead stays a female for four to six years before changing sex since all California sheephead are born female.

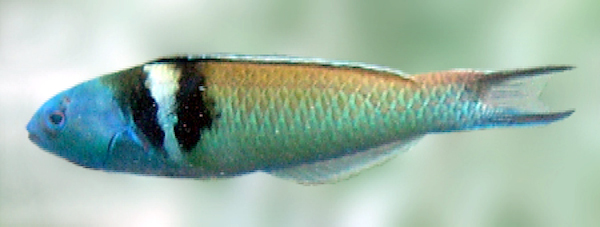
A terminal-phase male bluehead wrasse

Bluehead wrasses begin life as males or females, but females can change sex and function as males. Young females and males start with a dull initial-phase coloration before progressing into a brilliant terminal-phase coloration, which has a change in intensity of color, stripes, and bars. Terminal-phase coloration occurs when males become large enough to defend territory. Initial-phase males have larger testes than larger, terminal phase males, which enables the initial-phase males to produce a large amount of sperm. This strategy allows these males to compete with the larger territorial male.

Botryllus schlosseri, a colonial tunicate, is a protogynous hermaphrodite. In a colony, eggs are released about two days before the peak of sperm emission. Although self-fertilization is avoided and cross-fertilization favored by this strategy, self-fertilization is still possible. Self-fertilized eggs develop with a substantially higher frequency of anomalies during cleavage than cross-fertilized eggs (23% vs. 1.6%). Also a significantly lower percentage of larvae derived from self-fertilized eggs metamorphose, and the growth of the colonies derived from their metamorphosis is significantly lower. These findings suggest that self-fertilization gives rise to inbreeding depression associated with developmental deficits that are likely caused by expression of deleterious recessive mutations.

Other examples of protogynous organisms include:

- In the following fish families: Serranidae (groupers), Sparidae (porgies), Synbranchidae (swamp eels), Labridae (wrasses), Scaridae (parrotfishes), Pomacanthidae (angelfishes), Gobiidae (gobies), Lethrinidae (emperors), and possibly others.
- The intertidal isopod Gnorimosphaeroma oregonense.
- Protogyny sometimes occurs in the frog Rana temporaria, where older females will sometimes switch to being males.

=== Ultimate causes ===
The ultimate cause of a biological event determines how the event makes organisms better adapted to their environment, and thus why evolution by natural selection has produced that event. While a large number of ultimate causes of hermaphroditism have been proposed, the two causes most relevant to sequential hermaphroditism are the size-advantage model and protection against inbreeding.

==== Size-advantage model ====
The size-advantage model states that individuals of a given sex reproduce more effectively if they are a certain size or age. To create selection for sequential hermaphroditism, small individuals must have higher reproductive fitness as one sex and larger individuals must have higher reproductive fitness as the opposite sex. For example, eggs are larger than sperm, thus larger individuals are able to make more eggs, so individuals could maximize their reproductive potential by beginning life as male and then turning female upon achieving a certain size.

In most ectotherms, body size and female fecundity are positively correlated. This supports the size-advantage model. Kazancioglu and Alonzo (2010) performed the first comparative analysis of sex change in Labridae. Their analysis supports the size-advantage model and suggest that sequential hermaphroditism is correlated to the size-advantage. They determined that dioecy was less likely to occur when the size advantage is stronger than other advantages. Warner suggests that selection for protandry may occur in populations where female fecundity is augmented with age and individuals mate randomly. Selection for protogyny may occur where there are traits in the population that depress male fecundity at early ages (territoriality, mate selection or inexperience) and when female fecundity is decreased with age, the latter seems to be rare in the field. An example of territoriality favoring protogyny occurs when there is a need to protect their habitat and being a large male is advantageous for this purpose. In the mating aspect, a large male has a higher chance of mating, while this has no effect on the female mating fitness. Thus, he suggests that female fecundity has more impact on sequential hermaphroditism than the age structures of the population.

The size-advantage model predicts that sex change would only be absent if the relationship between size/age with reproductive potential is identical in both sexes. With this prediction one would assume that hermaphroditism is very common, but this is not the case. Sequential hermaphroditism is very rare and according to scientists this is due to some cost that decreases fitness in sex changers as opposed to those who do not change sex. Some of the hypotheses proposed for the dearth of hermaphrodites are the energetic cost of sex change, genetic and/or physiological barriers to sex change, and sex-specific mortality rates.

In 2009, Kazanciglu and Alonzo found that dioecy was only favored when the cost of changing sex was very large. This indicates that the cost of sex change does not explain the rarity of sequential hermaphroditism by itself.

The size-advantage model also explains under which mating systems protogyny or protandry would be more adaptive. In a haremic mating system, with one large male controlling access to numerous females for mating, this large male achieves greater reproductive success than a small female as he can fertilize numerous batches of eggs. So in this kind of haremic mating system (such as many wrasses), protogyny is the most adaptive strategy ("breed as a female when small, and then change to male when you're large and able to control a harem"). In a paired mating system (one male mates with one female, such as in clownfish or moray eels) the male can only fertilize one batch of eggs, whereas the female needs only a small male to fertilize her batch of eggs. so the larger she is, the more eggs she'll be able to produce and have fertilized. Therefore, in this kind of paired mating system, protandry is the most adaptive strategy ("breed as a male when small, and then change to female when you're larger").

==== Protection against inbreeding ====
Sequential hermaphroditism can also protect against inbreeding in populations of organisms that have low enough motility and/or are sparsely distributed enough that there is a considerable risk of siblings encountering each other after reaching sexual maturity, and interbreeding. If siblings are all the same or similar ages, and if they all begin life as one sex and then transition to the other sex at about the same age, then siblings are highly likely to be the same sex at any given time. This should dramatically reduce the likelihood of inbreeding. Both protandry and protogyny are known to help prevent inbreeding in plants, and many examples of sequential hermaphroditism attributable to inbreeding prevention have been identified in a wide variety of animals.

=== Proximate causes ===
The proximate cause of a biological event concerns the molecular and physiological mechanisms that produce the event. Many studies have focused on the proximate causes of sequential hermaphroditism, which may be caused by various hormonal and enzyme changes in organisms.

The role of aromatase has been widely studied in this area. Aromatase is an enzyme that controls the androgen/estrogen ratio in animals by catalyzing the conversion of testosterone into oestradiol, which is irreversible. It has been discovered that the aromatase pathway mediates sex change in both directions in organisms. Many studies also involve understanding the effect of aromatase inhibitors on sex change. One such study was performed by Kobayashi et al. In their study they tested the role of estrogens in male three-spot wrasses (Halichoeres trimaculatus). They discovered that fish treated with aromatase inhibitors showed decreased gonadal weight, plasma estrogen level and spermatogonial proliferation in the testis as well as increased androgen levels. Their results suggest that estrogens are important in the regulation of spermatogenesis in this protogynous hermaphrodite.

Previous studies have also investigated sex reversal mechanisms in teleost fish. During sex reversal, their whole gonads including the germinal epithelium undergoes significant changes, remodeling, and reformation. One study on the teleost Synbranchus marmoratus found that metalloproteinases (MMPs) were involved in gonadal remodeling. In this process, the ovaries degenerated and were slowly replaced by the germinal male tissue. In particular, the action of MMPs induced significant changes in the interstitial gonadal tissue, allowing for reorganization of germinal epithelial tissue. The study also found that sex steroids help in the sex reversal process by being synthesized as Leydig cells replicate and differentiate. Thus, the synthesis of sex steroids coincides with gonadal remodeling, which is triggered by MMPs produced by germinal epithelial tissue. These results suggests that MMPs and changes in steroid levels play a large role in sequential hermaphroditism in teleosts.

=== Genetic consequences ===
Sequential hermaphrodites almost always have a sex ratio biased towards the birth sex, and consequently experience significantly more reproductive success after switching sexes. According to the population genetics theory, this should decrease genetic diversity and effective population size (Ne). However, a study of two ecologically similar santer sea bream (gonochoric) and slinger sea bream (protogynous) in South African waters found that genetic diversities were similar in the two species, and while Ne was lower in the instant for the sex-changer, they were similar over a relatively short time horizon. The ability of these organisms to change biological sex has allowed for better reproductive success based on the ability for certain genes to pass down more easily from generation to generation. The change in sex also allows for organisms to reproduce if no individuals of the opposite sex are already present.

== Botany ==
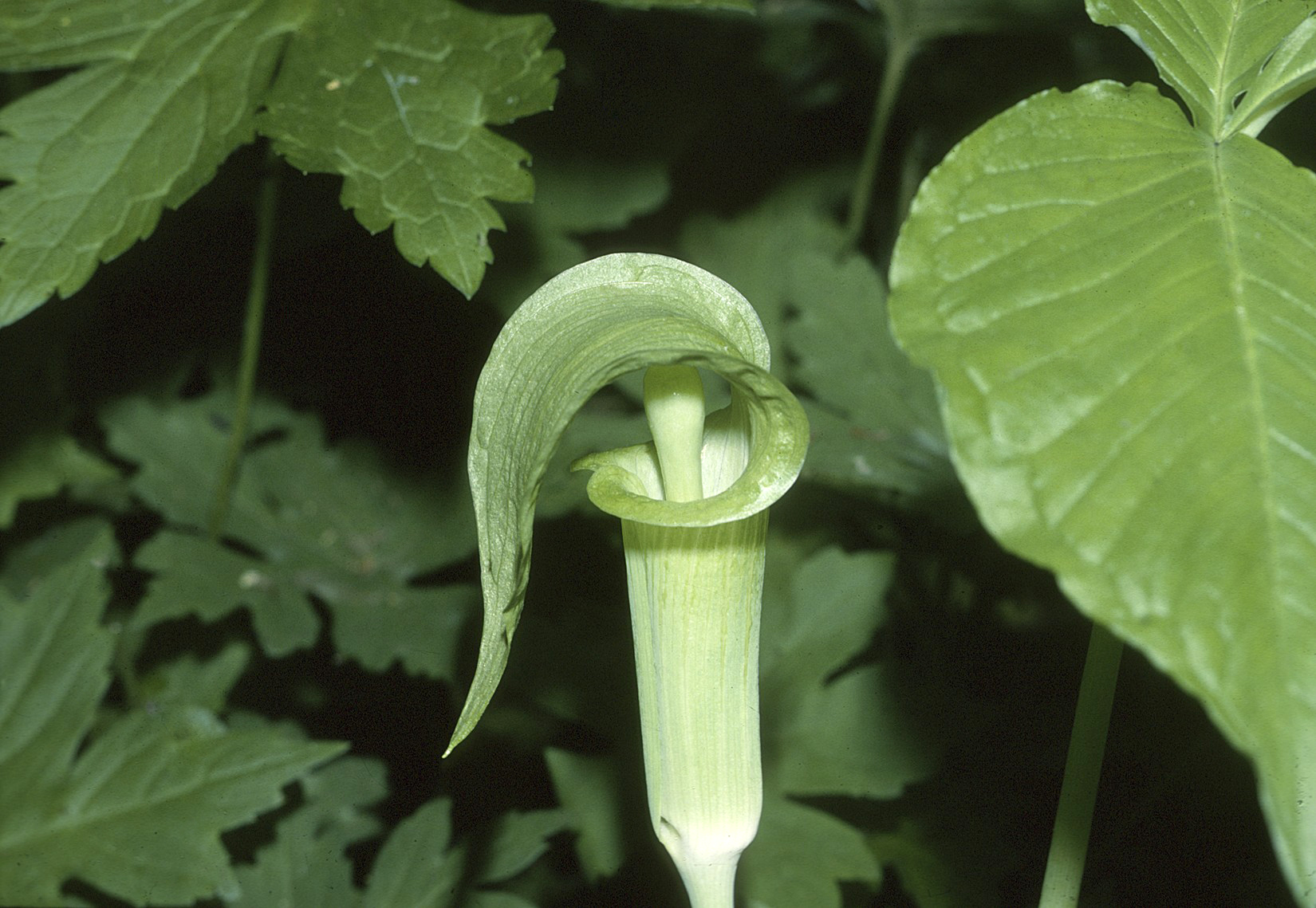
Small male Arisaema triphyllum plant

Sequential hermaphroditism in plants is the process in which a plant changes its sex during its lifetime. Sequential hermaphroditism in plants is very rare. There are less than 0.1% of recorded cases in which plant species entirely change their sex. The Patchy Environment Model and Size Dependent Sex Allocation are the two environmental factors which drive sequential hermaphroditism in plants. The Patchy Environment Model states that plants maximize the use of their resources by changing their sex. For example, if a plant benefits more from the resources of a given environment in a certain sex, it will change to that sex. Furthermore, Size Dependent Sex Allocation outlines that in sequential hermaphroditic plants, it is preferable to change sexes in a way that maximizes their overall fitness compared to their size over time. Similar to maximizing the use of resources, if the combination of size and fitness for a certain sex is more beneficial, the plant will change to that sex. Evolutionarily, sequential hermaphrodites emerged as certain species obtained a reproductive advantage by changing their sex.

=== Arisaema ===
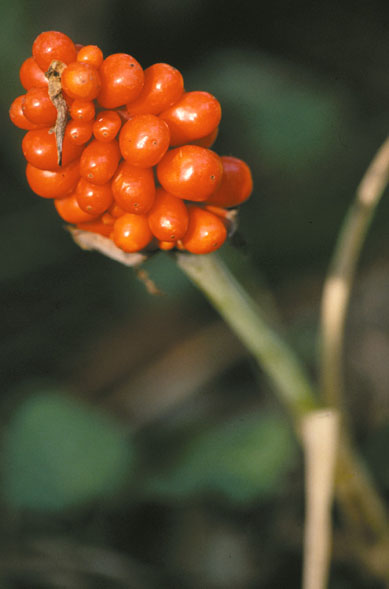
Female Arisaema triphyllum plant

Arisaema triphyllum (Jack in the pulpit) is a plant species which is commonly cited as exercising sequential hermaphroditism. As A. triphyllum grows, it develops from a nonsexual juvenile plant, to a young all-male plant, to a male-and-female plant, to an all-female plant. This means that A. triphyllum is changing its sex from male to female over the course of its lifetime as its size increases, showcasing Size Dependent Sex Allocation. Another example is Arisaema dracontium or the green dragon, which can change its sex on a yearly basis. The sex of A. dracontium is also dependent on size: the smaller flowers are male while the larger flowers are both male and female. Typically in Arisaema species, small flowers only contain stamens, meaning they are males. Larger flowers can contain both stamen and pistils or only pistils, meaning they can be either hermaphrodites or strictly female.

=== Striped maple (Acer pensylvanicum) ===
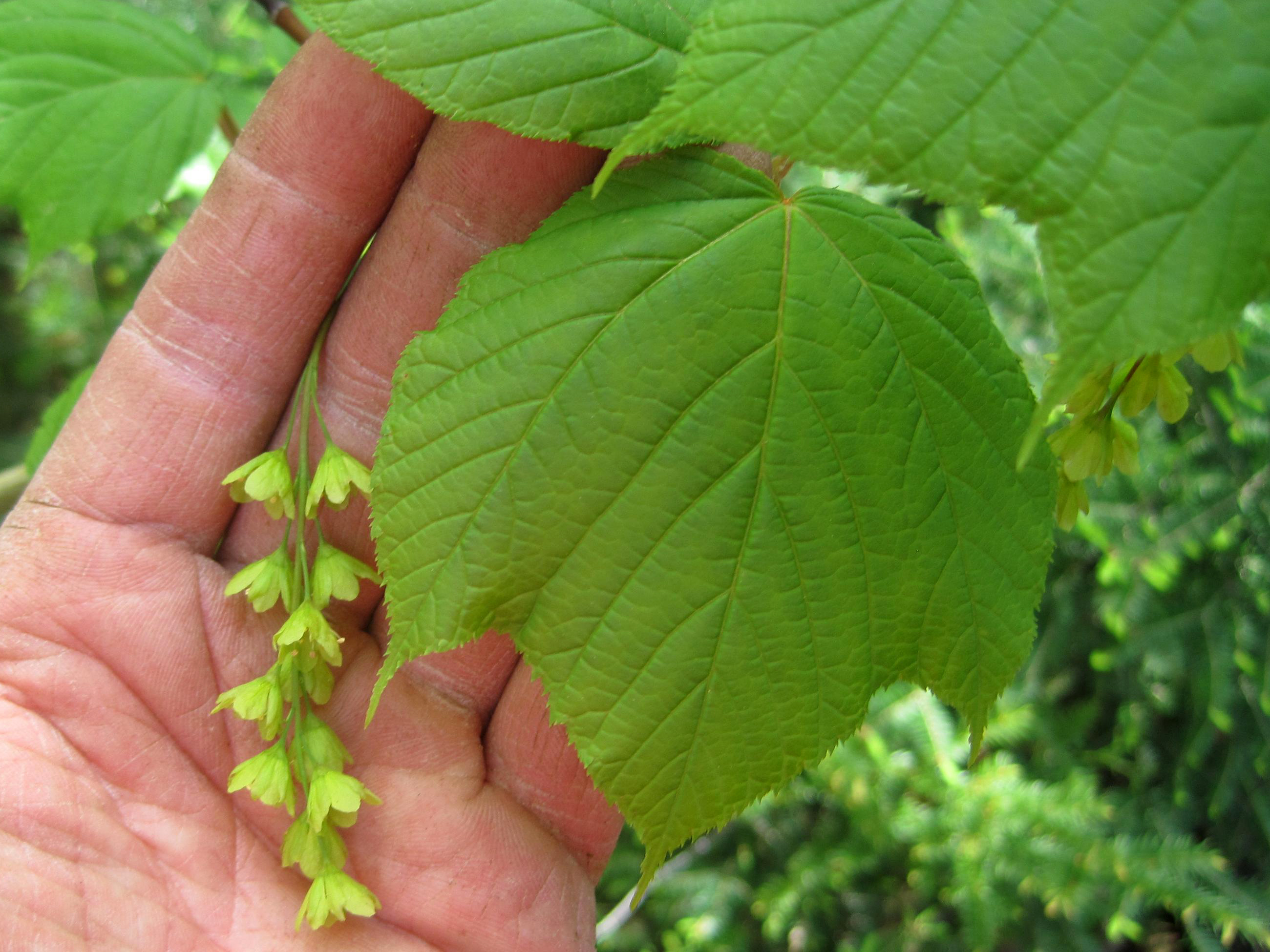
Striped maple or Acer pensylvanicum

Striped maple trees (Acer pensylvanicum) have been shown to change sex over a period of several years, and are sequential hermaphrodites. When branches were removed from striped maple trees they changed to female or to female and male as a response to the damage. Sickness will also trigger a sex change to either female or female and male.

=== Dichogamy in flowering plants ===
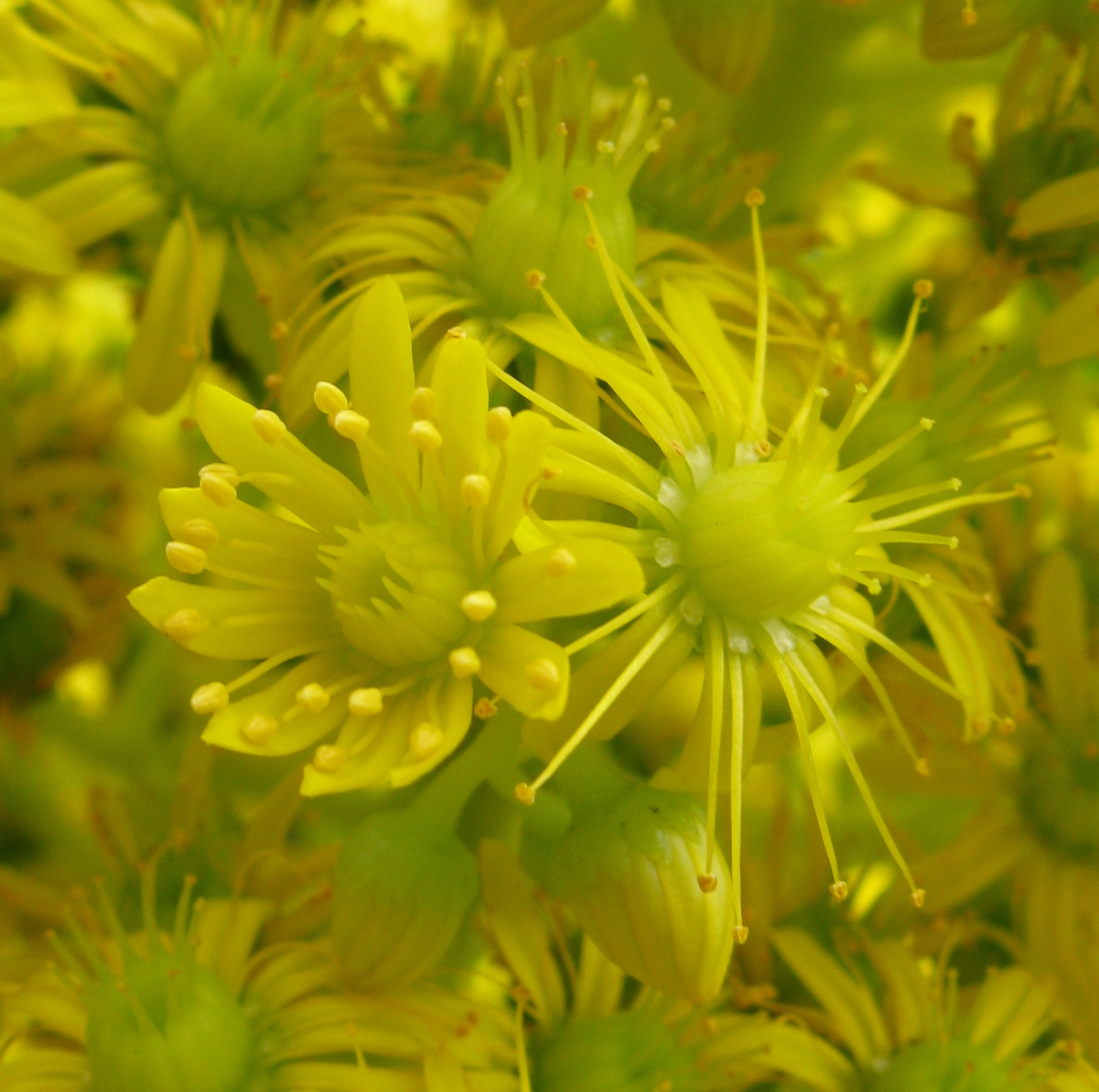
Protandrous flowers of Aeonium undulatum

In the context of the sexuality of flowering plants (angiosperms), there are two forms of dichogamy: protogyny—female function precedes male function—and protandry—male function precedes female function. Examples include in Asteraceae, bisexual tubular (disks) florets are usually protandrous. Whereas in Acacia and Banksia flowers are protogynous, with the style of the female flower elongating, then later in the male phase the anthers shedding pollen. Asimina triloba exhibits synchronized protogyny across all individuals in a clonal stand. In cultivation, growers often plant different cultivars together to stagger flower transition times to increase fertilization rates for greater fruit yields.

==== Evolution ====
Historically, dichogamy has been regarded as a mechanism for reducing inbreeding. However, a survey of the angiosperms found that self-incompatible (SI) plants, which are incapable of inbreeding, were as likely to be dichogamous as were self-compatible (SC) plants. This finding led to a reinterpretation of dichogamy as a more general mechanism for reducing the impact of pollen-pistil interference on pollen import and export. Unlike the inbreeding avoidance hypothesis, which focused on female function, this interference-avoidance hypothesis considers both reproductive functions.

==== Mechanism ====
In many hermaphroditic plant species, the close physical proximity of anthers and stigma makes interference unavoidable, either within a flower or between flowers on an inflorescence. Within-flower interference, which occurs when either the pistil interrupts pollen removal or the anthers prevent pollen deposition, can result in autonomous or facilitated self-pollination. Between-flower interference results from similar mechanisms, except that the interfering structures occur on different flowers within the same inflorescence and it requires pollinator activity. This results in geitonogamous pollination, the transfer of pollen between flowers of the same individual. In contrast to within-flower interference, geitonogamy necessarily involves the same processes as outcrossing: pollinator attraction, reward provisioning, and pollen removal. Therefore, between-flower interference not only carries the cost of self-fertilization (inbreeding depression), but also reduces the amount of pollen available for export (so-called "pollen discounting"). Because pollen discounting diminishes outcross siring success, interference avoidance may be an important evolutionary force in floral biology. Dichogamy may reduce between-flower interference by reducing or eliminating the temporal overlap between stigma and anthers within an inflorescence. Large inflorescences attract more pollinators, potentially enhancing reproductive success by increasing pollen import and export. However, large inflorescences also increase the opportunities for both geitonogamy and pollen discounting, so that the opportunity for between-flower interference increases with inflorescence size. Consequently, the evolution of floral display size may represent a compromise between maximizing pollinator visitation and minimizing geitonogamy and pollen discounting (Barrett et al., 1994).

==== Protandry ====
Protandry may be particularly relevant to this compromise, because it often results in an inflorescence structure with female phase flowers positioned below male phase flowers. Given the tendency of many insect pollinators to forage upwards through inflorescences, protandry may enhance pollen export by reducing between-flower interference. Furthermore, this enhanced pollen export should increase as floral display size increases, because between-flower interference should increase with floral display size. These effects of protandry on between-flower interference may decouple the benefits of large inflorescences from the consequences of geitonogamy and pollen discounting. Such a decoupling would provide a significant reproductive advantage through increased pollinator visitation and siring success.

==== Advantages ====
It has been demonstrated experimentally that dichogamy both reduced rates of self-fertilization and enhanced outcross siring success through reductions in geitonogamy and pollen discounting, respectively. The influence of inflorescence size on this siring advantage shows bimodal distribution, with increased siring success with both small and large display sizes.

The duration of stigmatic receptivity plays a key role in regulating the isolation of the male and female stages in dichogamous plants, and stigmatic receptivity can be influenced by both temperature and humidity. In the moth pollinated orchid, Satyrium longicauda, protandry tends to promote male mating success.

== See also ==
- Plant sexuality
- Sequential hermaphrodite section in Hermaphrodite
