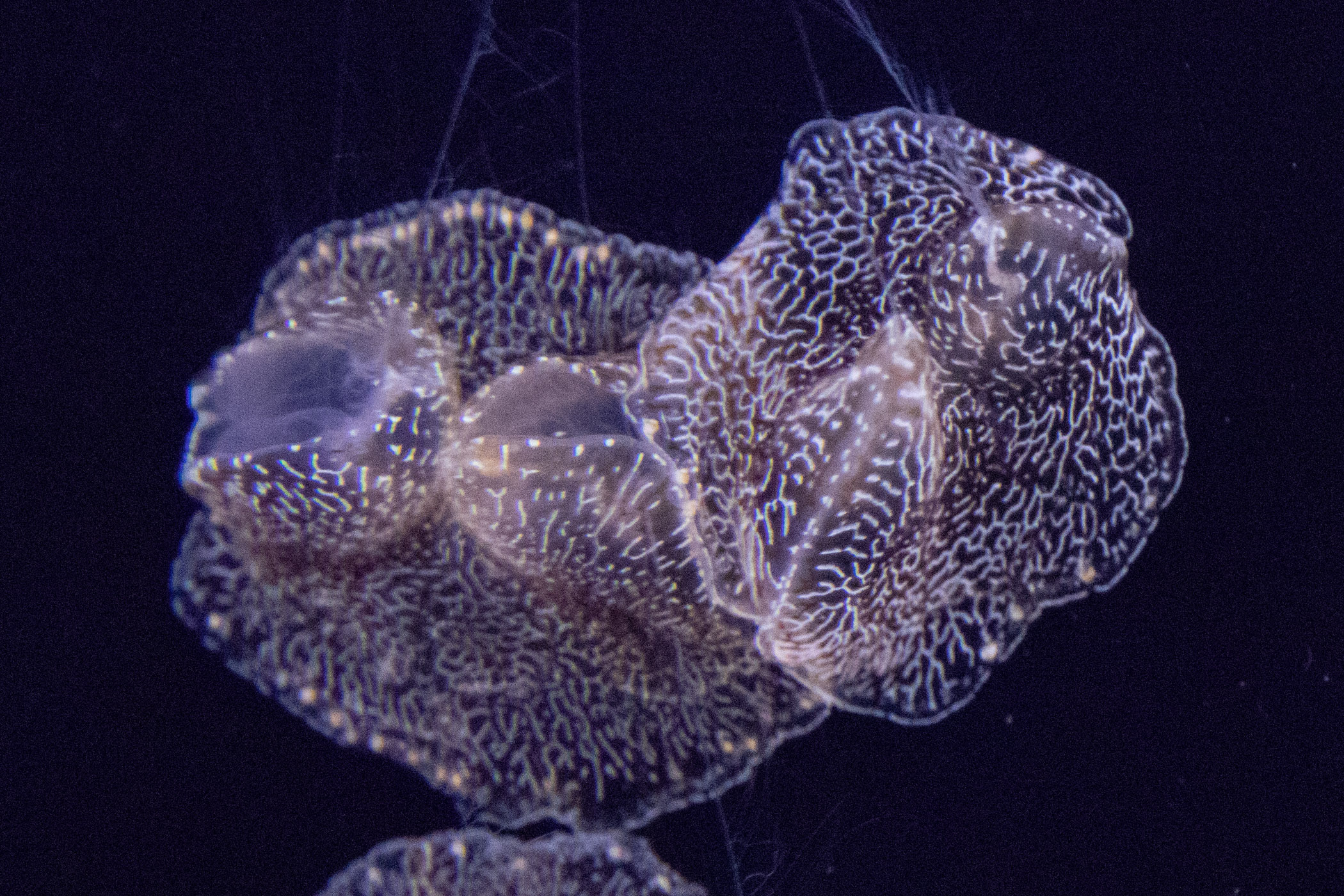
- Two B. meteoris, with tentacles streaming
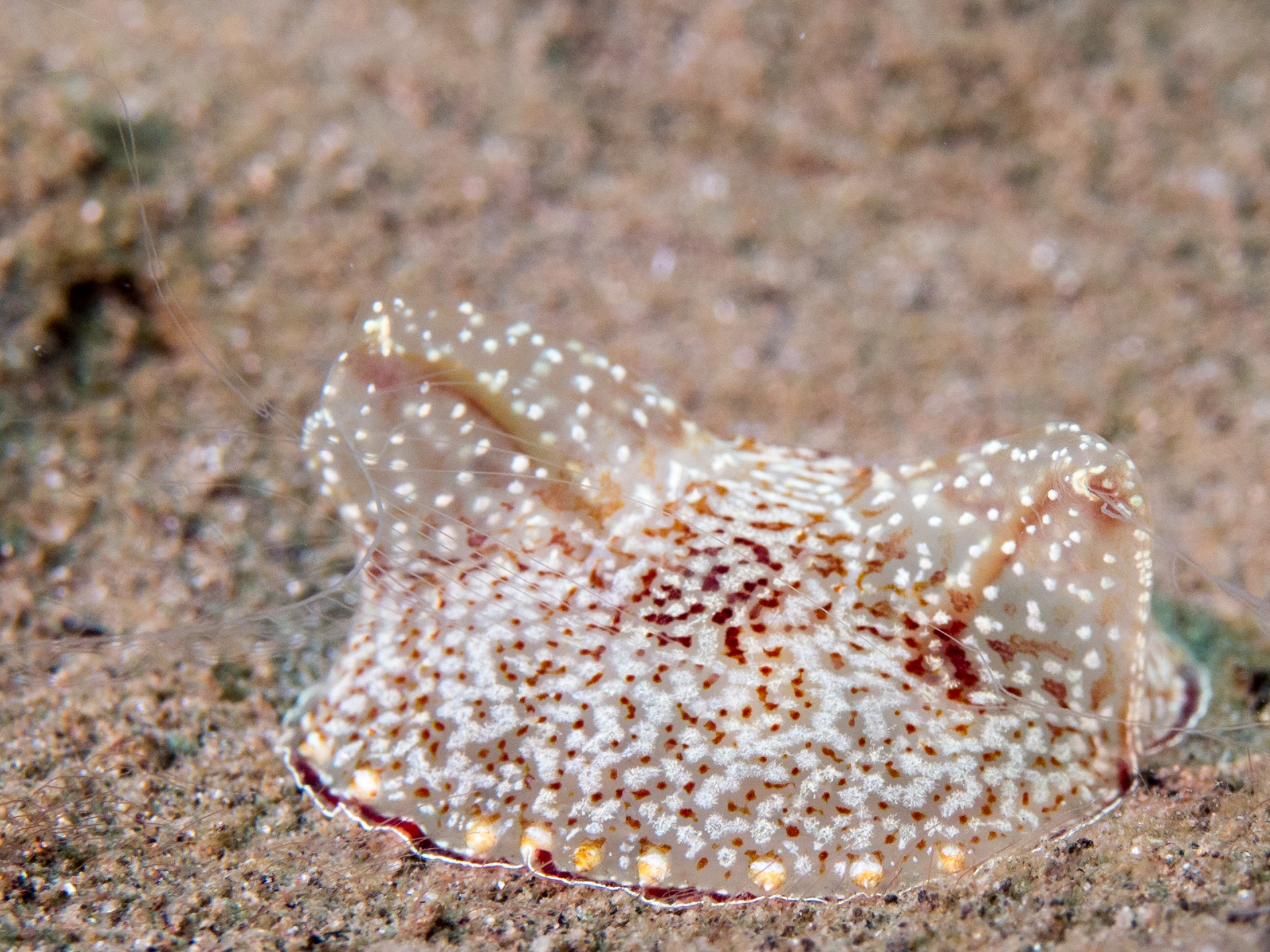
- Benthoplana meteoris on sediment

Scientific classification
- Kingdom: Animalia
- Phylum: Ctenophora
- Class: Tentaculata
- Order: Platyctenida
- Family: Benthoplanidae
- Genus: Benthoplana; Fricke & Plante, 1971
- Species: B. meteoris

Binomial name
- Benthoplana meteoris (Thiel, 1968)

= Benthoplana =

Genus of comb jelly

Benthoplana is a genus of platyctenid containing a single species, Benthoplana meteoris (previously classified as Coeloplana meteoris). B. meteoris is native to the Indo-Pacific region but has also been found in the Arabian-Persian gulf. They grow up to a few centimeters in diameter.

== Description ==
Like other platyctenids, B. meteoris has a flattened underside and two tentacles that extend from tentacle sheathes on its aboral side. These sheathes are more prominent in Benthoplana meteoris than in other species of platyctenids, giving it its recognizable shape. This three-dimensional aspect of its body is unusual among platyctenids.

== Ecology ==
This comb jelly lives freely on soft sediment, unlike other benthic ctenophora which are typically parasitic. They are hermaphroditic like most platyctenids, and are also capable of asexual reproduction via body fission and regeneration.

== Taxonomy ==
Based on recent morphological and genetic analysis, it has been suggested that the species Ctenoplana neritica is a juvenile form of B. meteoris. The same analysis reclassified B. meteoris as a member of a sister genus to Vallicula under the new family Benthoplanidae rather than as a member of Coeloplana.
