= Laevapex =

Scientific classification
- Kingdom: Animalia
- Phylum: Mollusca
- Class: Gastropoda
- Superorder: Hygrophila
- Family: Planorbidae
- Tribe: Ancylini
- Genus: Laevapex; Walker 1903

Type species
- Ancylus fuscus C. B. Adams, 1841

Species
- See text

Genus of gastropods

Laevapex is a genus of small, freshwater, air-breathing limpets, aquatic pulmonate gastropod molluscs in the family Planorbidae, the ram's horn snails and their allies.

== Geographic distribution ==
The genus has a New World distribution. It is widespread throughout the eastern United States, occurring in lakes and slow-flowing rivers.

== Anatomy ==
These animals have a pallial lung, as do all pulmonate snails, but they also have a false gill or "pseudobranch" which can serve perfectly well as a gill when they are unable to reach the surface for air.

Members of this genus are characterised by their smooth apex.

== Species ==
Species within the genus Laevapex include:

- Laevapex diaphanus Haldeman, 1841
- Laevapex fuscus C. B. Adams, 1841
- Laevapex peninsulae Pilsbry, 1903
- Laevapex vazi Santos, 1989

Walther (2008) considers North American Laevapex monotypic, collectively synonymising L. diaphanus, L. peninsulae and unidentified Laevapex sp. with L. fuscus, the type species.
