= Laevapex fuscus =

Conservation status
- Least Concern (IUCN 3.1)

- Secure (NatureServe)

Scientific classification
- Kingdom: Animalia
- Phylum: Mollusca
- Class: Gastropoda
- Superorder: Hygrophila
- Family: Planorbidae
- Genus: Laevapex
- Species: L. fuscus

Binomial name
- Laevapex fuscus (C.B. Adams, 1841)

Species of gastropod

Laevapex fuscus, the dusky ancylid, is a species of small, freshwater, air-breathing limpet, an aquatic pulmonate gastropod mollusc or micromollusc in the family Planorbidae, the ram's horn snails and their allies.

== Geographic distribution ==
L. fuscus is found throughout North America east of the Great Plains, except for mountainous areas. It has been recorded in Canada, the United States, Jamaica and Puerto Rico.

== Description ==
L. fuscus was originally described as Ancylus fuscus in 1841 by Charles Baker Adams:

"Shell thin, transparent without the epidermis, not much elevated, elliptical, moderately curved at the sides; epidermis brown, visible through the shell, giving it the appearance of having the same color, thick, rough, slightly extending beyond the margin of the shell; apex obtuse, moderately prominent, scarcely behind the middle, inclining to the right, so as to have only two fifths of the width on that side.

Length, .31 inches (7.9 mm), width, .22 in (5.6 mm); height, .05 in (1.3 mm)."

== Habitat and ecology ==
L. fuscus generally occurs in lacustrine habitats, preferring calmer waters than other ancylid genera.

Simple annual (univoltine) and two-generation per year (bivoltine) life cycles have been reported in New York populations of L. fuscus. The bioenergetic data collected for the species suggest that its reproductive effort is in line with expectation from adult weight, and hence that its life history strategy is undifferentiated. The species is functionally protandric, despite being one of the more specialised of higher limnic pulmonate snails.

L. fuscus has been observed attached to the wings or hemelytra of the water bug species Belostoma flumineum (Hemiptera: Belostomatidae). This observation suggests that belostomatids might serve as a mode of transport and a passive dispersal agent for L. fuscus and other ancylid species.

== See also ==
- List of non-marine molluscs of the United States
- List of non-marine molluscs of Jamaica
- List of non-marine molluscs of Puerto Rico
