= Laevapex vazi =

Scientific classification
- Domain: Eukaryota
- Kingdom: Animalia
- Phylum: Mollusca
- Class: Gastropoda
- Superorder: Hygrophila
- Family: Planorbidae
- Genus: Laevapex
- Species: L. vazi

Binomial name
- Laevapex vazi Santos, 1989

Species of gastropod

Laevapex vazi is a species of small, freshwater, air-breathing limpet, an aquatic pulmonate gastropod mollusc or micromollusc in the family Planorbidae, the ram's horn snails and their allies.

== Etymology ==
The species name honours Dr. Jorge Faria Vaz of the Superintendency of Control of Endemic Diseases (SUCEN) of the state of São Paulo.

== Taxonomic note ==
At the time of the original species description its characteristic features of a smooth shell apex and an ejaculatory complex without a flagellum fitted better in the description for the genus Laevapex; however, the species is in need of taxonomic revision for the establishment of its true identity, since its shell and musculature do not fit in the characteristics of the genus.

== Geographic distribution ==
L. vazi is only known from its type locality, Ourinhos, São Paulo, Brazil.

== Description ==
L. vazi has a thin, diaphanous shell, with an oval or elliptical aperture. The apex is rounded, slightly projected and bent to the right, reaching the edge of the shell or extending beyond it. The protoconch shows a shallow apical depression and appears smooth under optical microscopy. The teleoconch shows fine growth lines and rare, almost imperceptible radial lines. The mantle pigmentation is concentrated on the left side. The right anterior muscular impression is larger than the left one and has an elliptical, almond-like form, while the anterior left and posterior ones are rounded. The pseudobranch is two-lobed and folded, the dorsal lobe being smaller than the ventral one. The rachidian tooth of the radula is quadricuspid, with the middle left cusp longer than the right one. In the lateral teeth, the mesocone is slightly more elongated than the others. The ovotestis has about 20 follicles. The seminal vesicle is located in the initial third of the ovisperm duct. The prostate is pear-shaped and has no follicles. The ejaculatory complex is small, without a flagellum but with a well developed ultra-penis and penis.

== See also ==
- List of non-marine molluscs of Brazil
