= Tjalfiella =

Scientific classification
- Kingdom: Animalia
- Phylum: Ctenophora
- Class: Tentaculata
- Order: Platyctenida
- Family: Tjalfiellidae; Komai, 1922
- Genus: Tjalfiella; Mortensen, 1910
- Species: T. tristoma

Binomial name
- Tjalfiella tristoma Mortensen, 1910

Family of comb jellies

Tjalfiellidae is a family of ctenophores belonging to the order Platyctenida. Its only species is Tjalfiella tristoma.

Tjalfiella is recorded by Mortensen (1912) from deep water off Greenland. Its whole length is about 14 cm; the width is 12 cm — smaller than Lyrocteis imperatoris.
