= Coeloplana yulianicorum =

Scientific classification
- Domain: Eukaryota
- Kingdom: Animalia
- Phylum: Ctenophora
- Class: Tentaculata
- Order: Platyctenida
- Family: Coeloplanidae
- Genus: Coeloplana
- Species: C. yulianicorum

Binomial name
- Coeloplana yulianicorum Alamaru, Brokovich & Loya, 2015

Species of comb jelly

Coeloplana yulianicorum is a species of benthic comb jelly. It is known from the Red Sea and lives as an episymbiont on the soft coral Sarcophyton yulianicorum. It can be differentiated from congeneric species by their host, colour, and colour pattern.
