= Coeloplana loyai =

Scientific classification
- Domain: Eukaryota
- Kingdom: Animalia
- Phylum: Ctenophora
- Class: Tentaculata
- Order: Platyctenida
- Family: Coeloplanidae
- Genus: Coeloplana
- Species: C. loyai

Binomial name
- Coeloplana loyai Alamaru & Brokovich, 2015

Species of comb jelly

Coeloplana loyai is a species of benthic comb jelly. It is known from the Red Sea and lives as an episymbiont on the mushroom corals Herpolitha limax and Ctenactis echinata. It can be differentiated from congeneric species by their host, colour, and colour pattern.
