= Coeloplana huchonae =

Scientific classification
- Kingdom: Animalia
- Phylum: Ctenophora
- Class: Tentaculata
- Order: Platyctenida
- Family: Coeloplanidae
- Genus: Coeloplana
- Species: C. huchonae

Binomial name
- Coeloplana huchonae Alamaru, Brokovich & Loya, 2015

Species of comb jelly

Coeloplana huchonae is a species of benthic comb jelly. It is known from the Red Sea and lives as an episymbiont on the stems of the soft coral Dendronephthya hemprichi. It can be differentiated from its congeneric species by their host, colour, and colour pattern.
