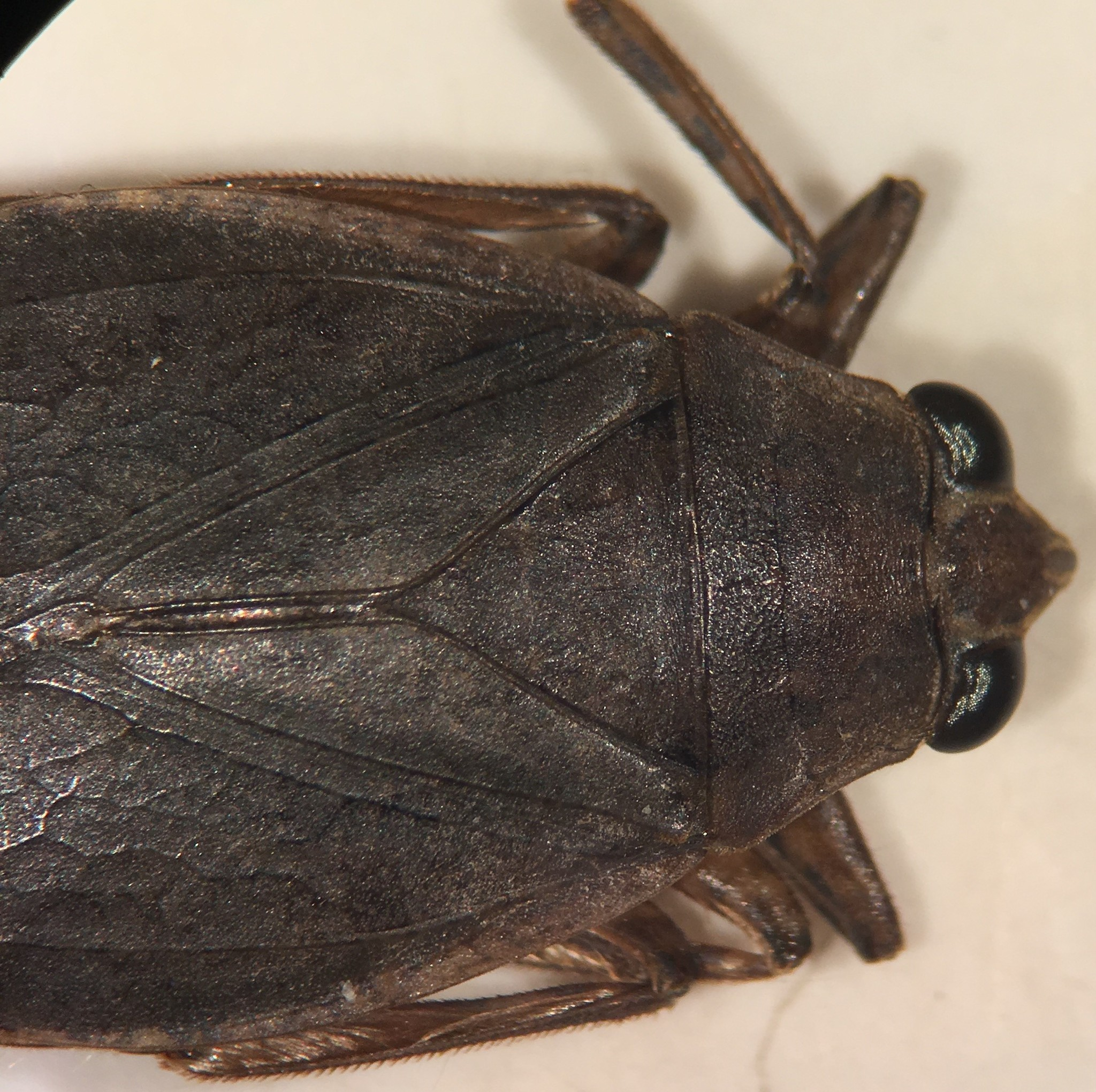

Scientific classification
- Kingdom: Animalia
- Phylum: Arthropoda
- Clade: Pancrustacea
- Class: Insecta
- Order: Hemiptera
- Suborder: Heteroptera
- Family: Belostomatidae
- Genus: Belostoma
- Species: B. testaceum

Binomial name
- Belostoma testaceum (Leidy, 1847)

= Belostoma testaceum =

Species of true bug

Belostoma testaceum is a species of giant water bug in the family Belostomatidae. It is found in the eastern United States from New York south to southern Florida and west to Texas and Michigan.
