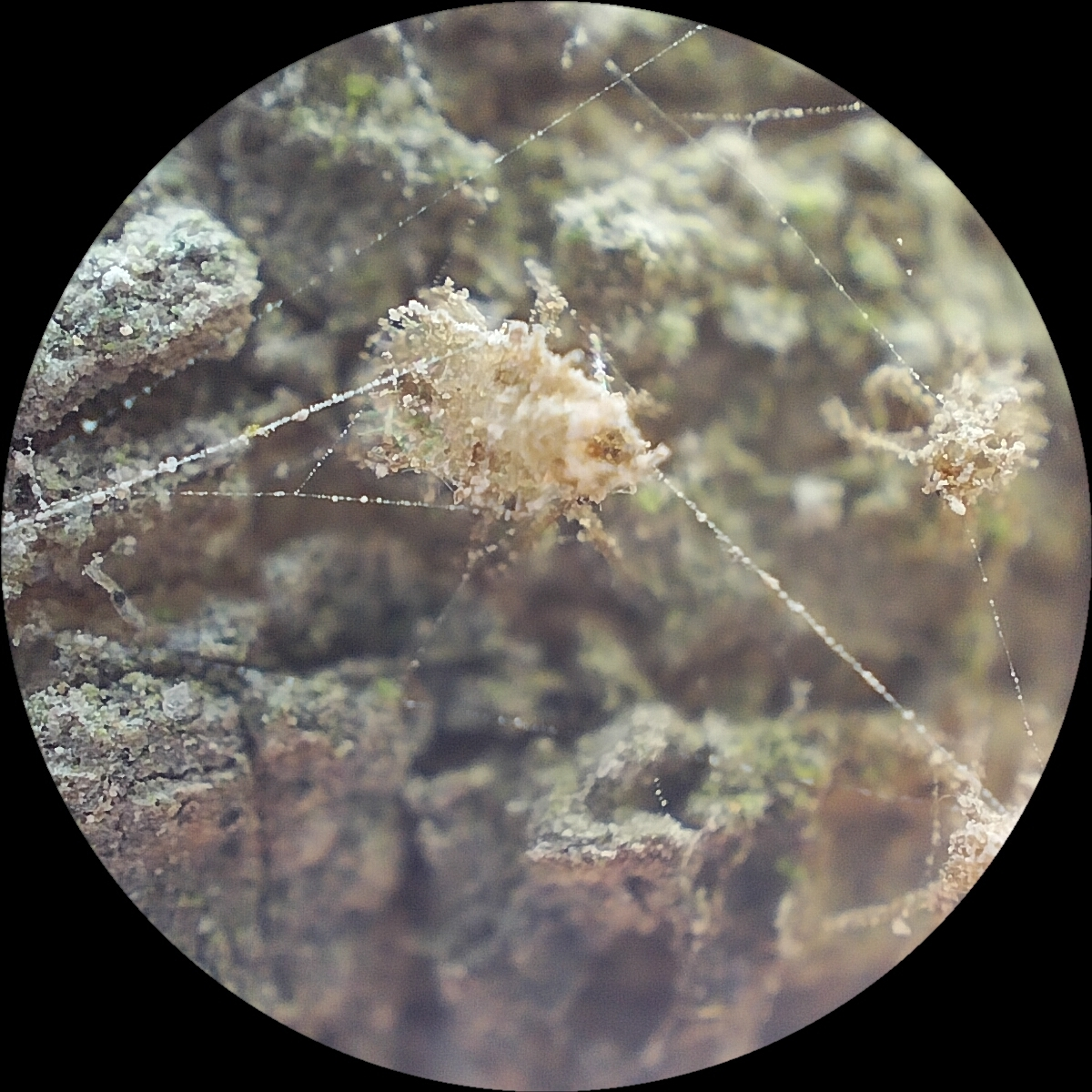

Scientific classification
- Kingdom: Animalia
- Phylum: Ctenophora
- Class: Tentaculata
- Order: Platyctenida
- Family: Benthoplanidae
- Genus: Vallicula; Rankin, 1956
- Species: V. multiformis

Binomial name
- Vallicula multiformis Rankin, 1956

= Vallicula =

Genus of comb jellies

Vallicula is a genus of ctenophora in the family Benthoplanidae, containing a single species, Vallicula multiformis.
