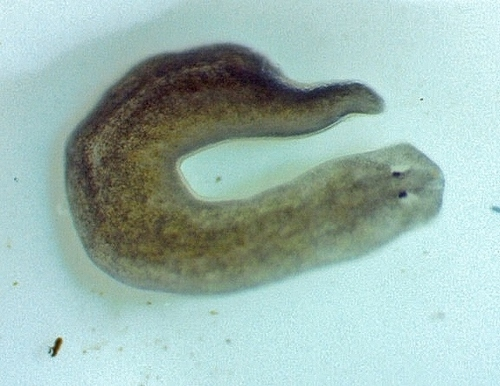
- Hymanella retenuova

Scientific classification
- Kingdom: Animalia
- Phylum: Platyhelminthes
- Order: Tricladida
- Family: Planariidae
- Genus: Hymanella; Castle, 1941

Species
- Hymanella retenuova Castle, 1941; Hymanella vernalis (Kenk, 1944); Hymanella baicalensis Timoshkin & Porfirieva, 1989?

= Hymanella =

Genus of flatworms

Hymanella is a genus of triclad belonging to the family Planariidae. Species have been found in North America.

== Etymology ==
The generic name was given in honor of Libbie Hyman, for her contributions to knowledge of American triclads. Hyman additionally had given the suggestion that a new genus be designated for the type species, Hymanella reteunova.
