= Hymanella vernalis =

Scientific classification
- Kingdom: Animalia
- Phylum: Platyhelminthes
- Order: Tricladida
- Family: Planariidae
- Genus: Hymanella
- Species: H. vernalis

Binomial name
- Hymanella vernalis (Kenk, 1944)

Species of flatworm

Hymanella vernalis is a species of flatworm, a terrestrial soft-bodied invertebrate in the family Planariidae. This species is reported in freshwater environments in North America.
