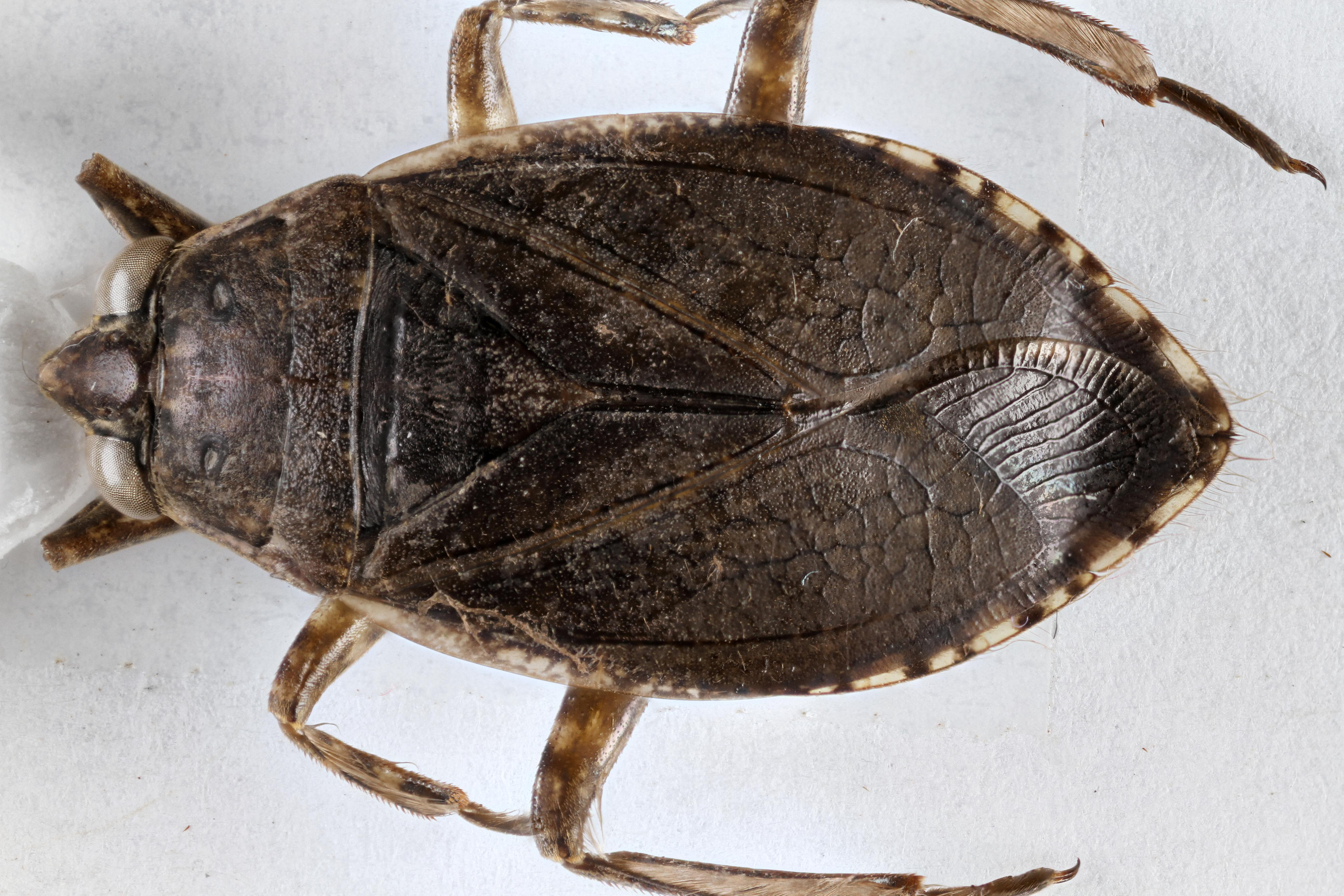

Scientific classification
- Domain: Eukaryota
- Kingdom: Animalia
- Phylum: Arthropoda
- Class: Insecta
- Order: Hemiptera
- Suborder: Heteroptera
- Family: Belostomatidae
- Genus: Belostoma
- Species: B. minor

Binomial name
- Belostoma minor (Palisot de Beauvois, 1805)

= Belostoma minor =

Species of true bug

Belostoma minor is a species of giant water bug in the family Belostomatidae. It is found in the northern Caribbean bioregion, with records in Cuba, the Dominican Republic, Jamaica, Puerto Rico, U.S. Virgin Islands, and southern Florida in the continental United States.
