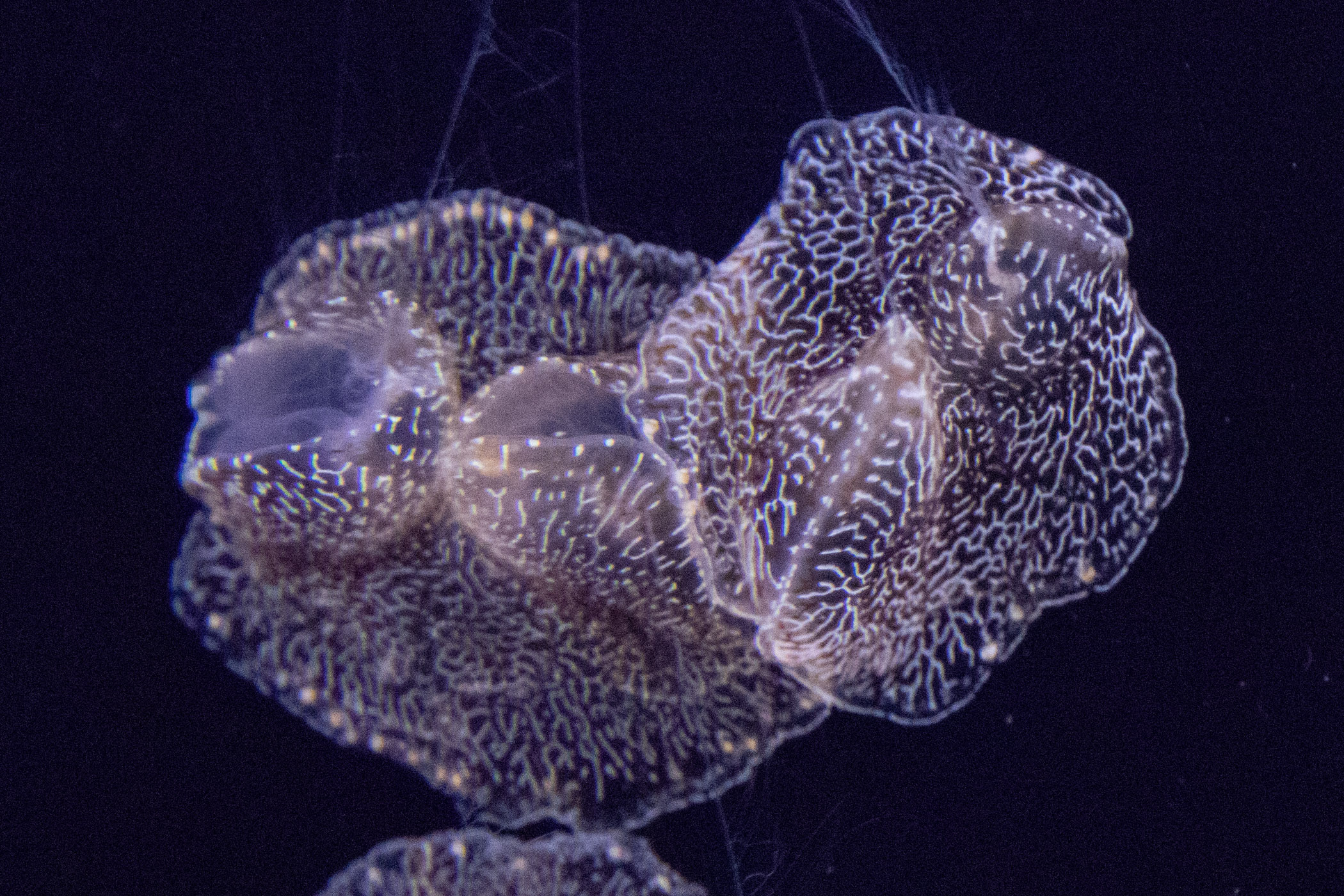
- Benthoplana meteoris
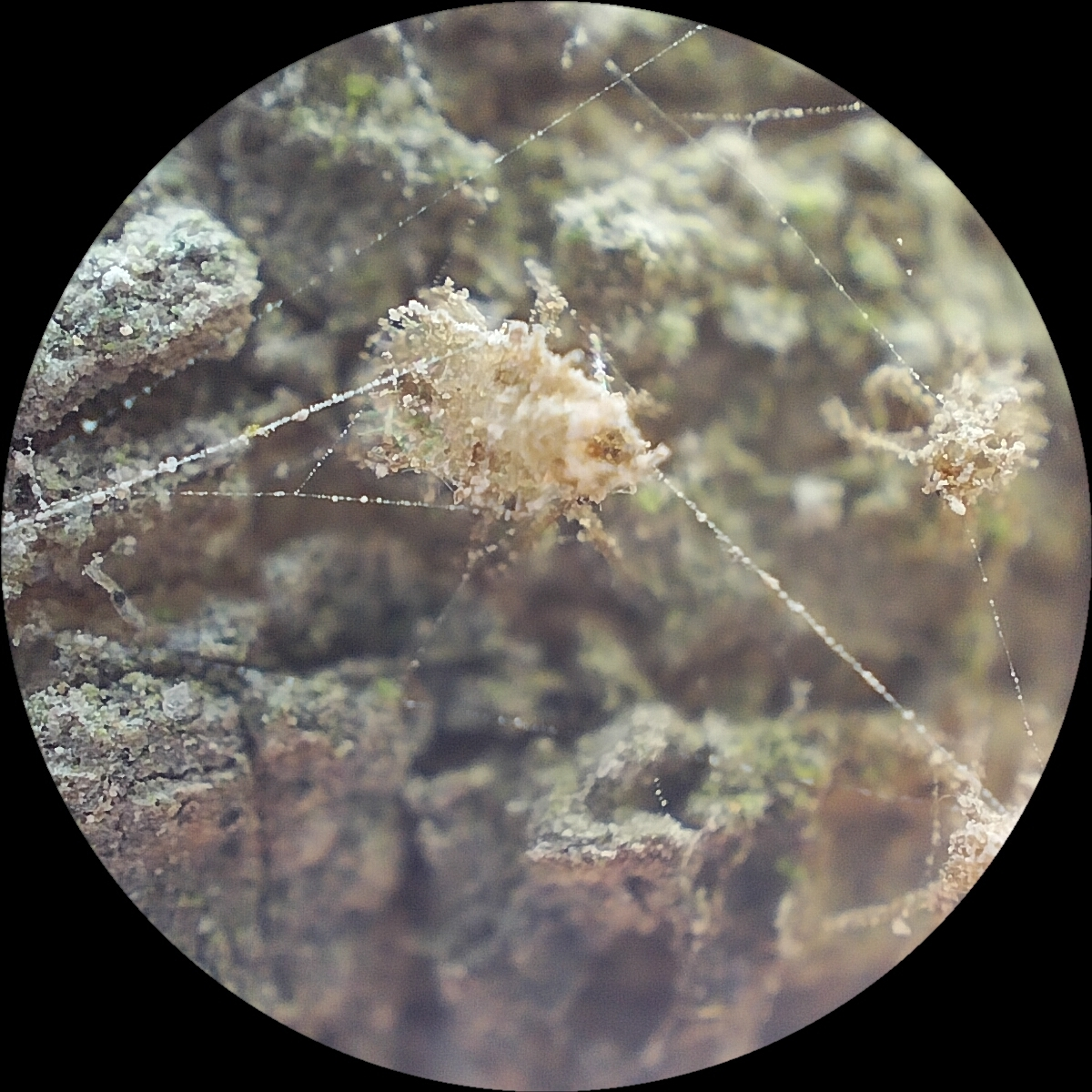
- Vallicula multiformis

Scientific classification
- Kingdom: Animalia
- Phylum: Ctenophora
- Class: Tentaculata
- Order: Platyctenida
- Family: Benthoplanidae; Bezio, Paulay & Collins, 2025

Genera
- Benthoplana Bezio, Paulay & Collins, 2025; Vallicula Rankin, 1956

= Benthoplanidae =

Family of comb jellies

Benthoplanidae is a family of benthic comb jellies. It contains two genera.
