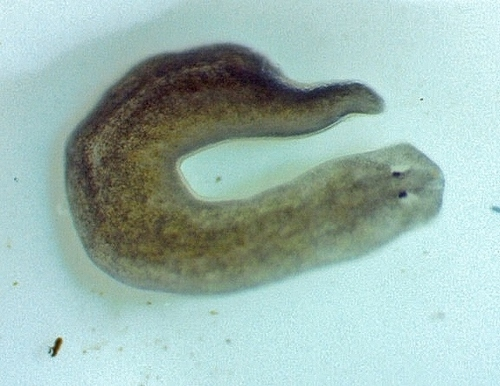

Scientific classification
- Kingdom: Animalia
- Phylum: Platyhelminthes
- Order: Tricladida
- Family: Planariidae
- Genus: Hymanella
- Species: H. retenuova

Binomial name
- Hymanella retenuova Castle, 1941

= Hymanella retenuova =

Species of flatworm

Hymanella retenuova is a species of flatworm, a terrestrial soft-bodied invertebrate in the family Planariidae.

== Description ==
Mature specimens attain the average size of 7-14 mm in length and 1.3-2.5 mm in width. Immature specimens attain the average size of 6-10 mm. Newborn specimens attain the average size of 1.5-3 mm. When gliding, the head truncates with bulging frontal margin with times appearing low triangular. The lateral corners of the head are round without a distinct neck constriction behind them. The two eyes of the species are farther removed from the front end than the lateral margins. The color of its body is grayish or brown. In life, it's indistinguishable from pigmented species of Phagocata and Planaria.

=== Reproduction morphology ===
The testicles are not well analyzed and are possibly dorsolateral and prepharyngeal but also could be ventral and longitudinally fused. The vasa deferentia behind the spermiductal vesicles ascend to the penis and unite. The penis is small and lacks a bulb consists of a papilla that's traversed by the ejaculatory duct that's formed by the uniform of sperm ducts. The genital atrium is large only represented by the male atrium which at the posterior end receives the opening of the common oviduct from the dorsal side. The copulatory bursa that varies in size's duct is narrow, running above the atrium and posteriorly arching down to the gonopore. No separate vagina is ever differentiated. The shape of the cocoon is ellipsoidal and unstalked and carried in the atrium for four weeks before being deposited.

== Morphology ==
During the observation of H. retenuova, the formation of egg capsules has been observed many times during the seasons the worms cultured in the laboratory the worms were studied in. The larger specimens contained mostly fully formed eggs when they were collected or during their sojourn. The species is only comparable to some species in genera Curtisia and Phagocata.

=== Egg morphology ===
During the formation of egg capsules, a large yolk is present with the worm in the atrium. Within one to several days, the yellowish eggshell forms around the yolk which within the next day or so, turns reddish-brown. The color of the eggshell deepened in the following period, but otherwise there was no further change. Egg capsules that were extruded had a mahogany pigment.

==== Egg hatching ====
Eggs remain dormant between summer and early autumn when ponds dry out. Dormant eggs have been called "winter" or "resting" egg capsules by other authors. A considerable period of dormancy can precede the hatching of egg capsules and it's possible that some kind of environmental stimulus is essential to induce the hatching of egg capsules. Drying egg capsules may collapse the egg capsules and freezing egg capsules don't induce the hatching of young worms.

=== Death ===
In the laboratory, the worms fixed late in the spring preceding the average time when they are expected to die, the worms experienced a breakdown in their internal structures; often, the worms decreased their body length when breaking down. The body tissues may eventually become yolk and that the death usually follows sexual reproduction can be the consequence of body reserve depletion. Death was often preceded with a period of local histolysis usually in the body regions posterior to the pharynx and atrium. Capsules hatch in an average of 6-8 weeks.

== Distribution ==
Species is found in vernal pools and seepage springs, ranging from the east of North America such as Massachusetts, North Carolina, Louisiana and west to Ontario.

== Biology ==
Species lives for 2-4 months and is protandrous. Life history similar to P. velata.
