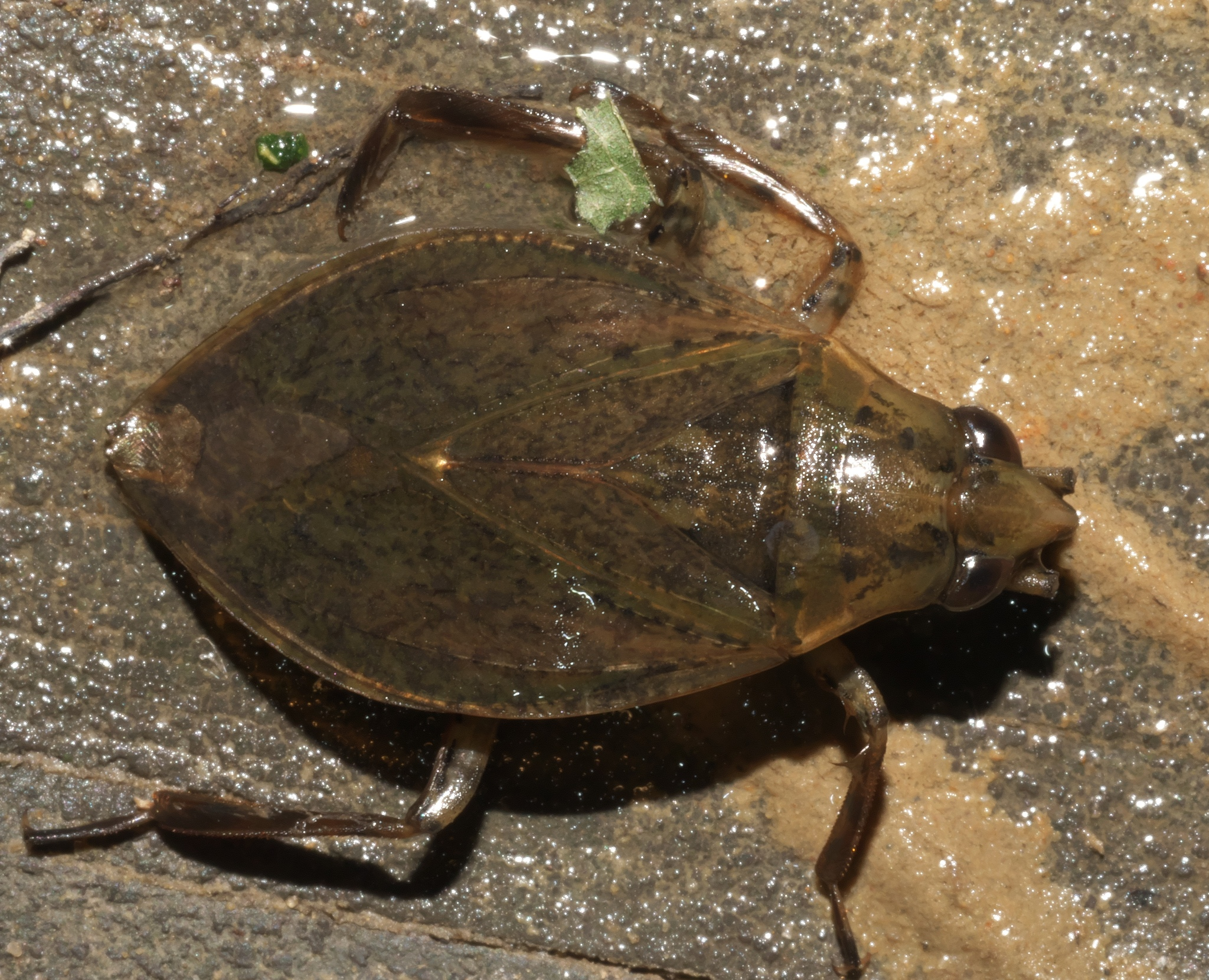
- Belostoma lutarium, Oklahoma

Scientific classification
- Domain: Eukaryota
- Kingdom: Animalia
- Phylum: Arthropoda
- Class: Insecta
- Order: Hemiptera
- Suborder: Heteroptera
- Family: Belostomatidae
- Genus: Belostoma
- Species: B. lutarium

Binomial name
- Belostoma lutarium (Stål, 1855)

= Belostoma lutarium =

Species of true bug

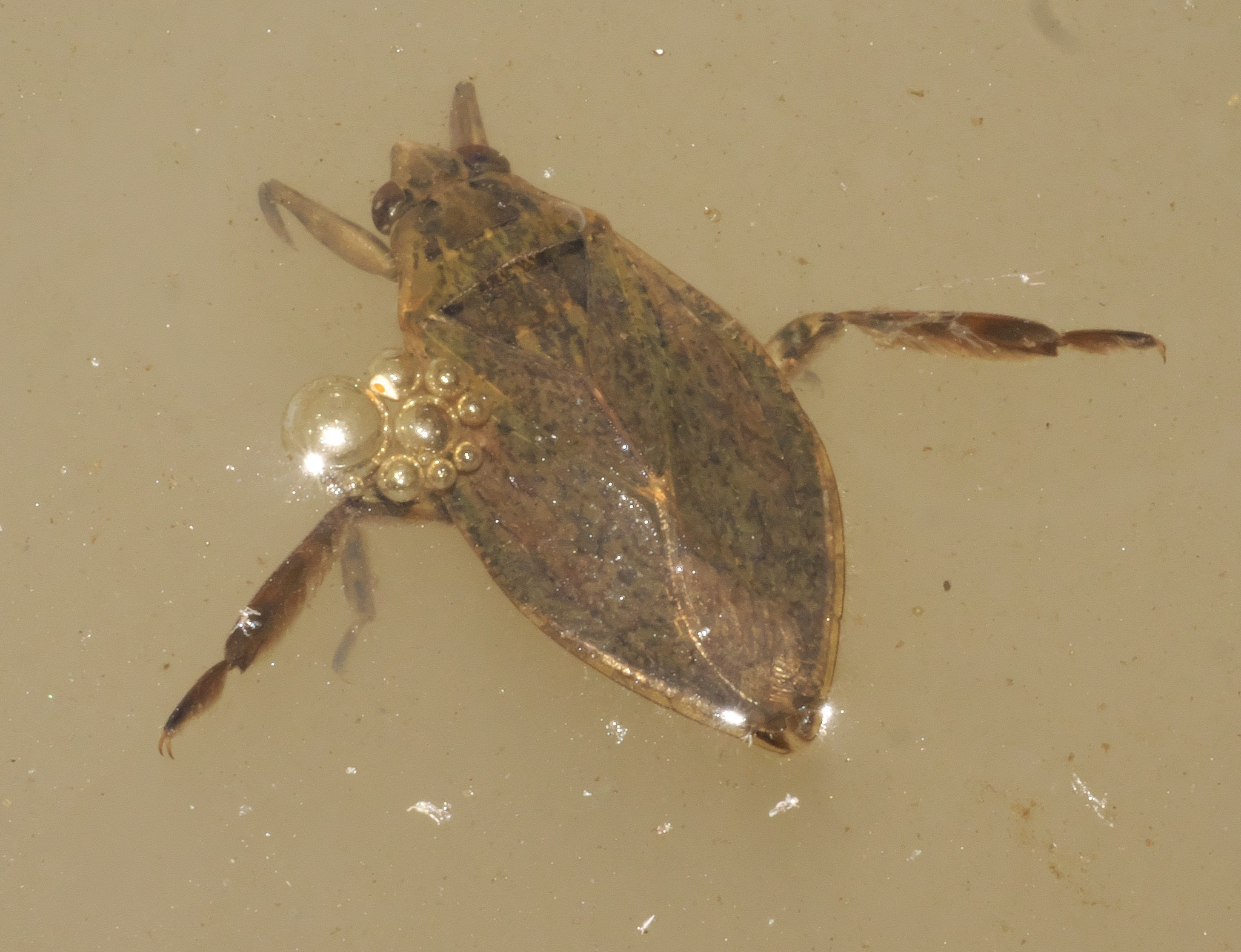
Belostoma lutarium, Oklahoma

Belostoma lutarium is a species of giant water bug in the family Belostomatidae. It is found in North America.
