= Belostoma bakeri =

Scientific classification
- Domain: Eukaryota
- Kingdom: Animalia
- Phylum: Arthropoda
- Class: Insecta
- Order: Hemiptera
- Suborder: Heteroptera
- Family: Belostomatidae
- Genus: Belostoma
- Species: B. bakeri

Binomial name
- Belostoma bakeri Montandon, 1913

Species of true bug

Belostoma bakeri is a species of giant water bug in the family Belostomatidae. It is found in Central America and North America.
