= Savangia =

Scientific classification
- Kingdom: Animalia
- Phylum: Ctenophora
- Class: Tentaculata
- Order: Platyctenida
- Family: Savangiidae; Harbison & Madin, 1982
- Genus: Savangia; Dawydoff, 1950
- Species: S. atentaculata

Binomial name
- Savangia atentaculata Dawydoff, 1950

Family of comb jellies

Savangiidae is a family of ctenophores belonging to the order Platyctenida.

Genera:

- Savangia Dawydoff, 1950
