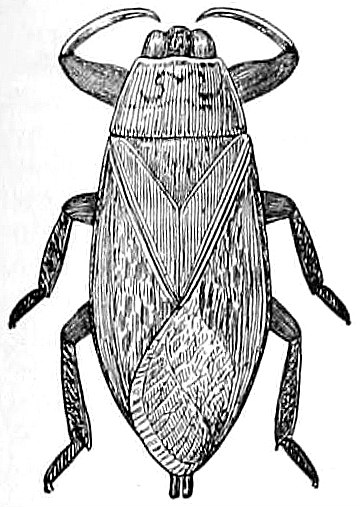

Scientific classification
- Kingdom: Animalia
- Phylum: Arthropoda
- Clade: Pancrustacea
- Class: Insecta
- Order: Hemiptera
- Suborder: Heteroptera
- Family: Belostomatidae
- Subfamily: Belostomatinae
- Tribe: Belostomatini
- Genus: Belostoma; Latreille, 1807

Synonyms
- Belostomum Burmeister, 1835; Perthostoma Leidy, 1847; Zaitha Amyot & Serville, 1843

= Belostoma =

Genus of true bugs

Belostoma is a genus of insects in the hemipteran family Belostomatidae, known colloquially as giant water bugs. Members of this genus are native to freshwater habitats in the Americas, with the greatest species richness in tropical South America. Most species in the family Belostomatidae have historically been included in Belostoma, but several of these have been moved to other genera (although Belostoma remains a genus with many members). 9 species are claimed to be found in Northern America, but the genus Belostoma is actually divided into 16 subgroups containing about 70 species.

== Habits ==
The morphology and the behavior of giant water bugs of the genus Belostoma is very similar to those of the genus Lethocerus and Abedus, which all belong to the family of the Belostomatidae. They also show breeding habits similar to those of the family of the Belostomatidae. They show paternal care. The males are carrying the eggs cemented on theirs backs, that are placed there by the females. The males carry them until the nymphs hatch.

Bugs of the genus Belostoma prefer lentic habitats with submerged or emergent vegetation and for overwintering the adults fly to ponds and slow-moving waters. During the springtime and the early summer they often fly to electric light-sources, thus they are also called "electric-light-bugs". The life circle contains one generation a year. The length of the bodies is between 15 and 41,5mm.

Nymphs and adults are predators eating fish, amphians, snails, and invertebrates. Sometimes small turtles and snakes also may be their prey. They stalk their prey by hanging head downwards under the water surface, striking using the rostrum and injecting digestive saliva. The sting of these bugs may be very painful but it is harmless, but because of that fact these bugs are also called "toe-biters". Encountered by larger animals they often play dead. Giant water bugs sometimes are eaten by crocodilia such as young alligators.

== Species ==
The following species belong to the genus Belostoma:^{i c g b}

- Belostoma amazonum Estévez & J. Polhemus, 2001
- Belostoma angustum Lauck, 1964
- Belostoma anurum (Herrich-Schaeffer, 1848)
- Belostoma asiaticum (Mayr, 1863)
- Belostoma aurivillianum (Montandon, 1899)
- Belostoma aztecum Lauck, 1959
- Belostoma bachmanni De Carlo, 1957
- Belostoma bakeri Montandon, 1913
- Belostoma bergi (Montandon, 1899)
- Belostoma bicavum Lauck, 1964
- Belostoma bifoveolatum Spinola, 1852
- Belostoma bordoni De Carlo, 1966
- Belostoma boscii Lepeletier de Saint Fargeau & Audinet-Serville, 1825
- Belostoma bosqi De Carlo, 1932
- Belostoma cachoeirinhensis Lanzer-de-Souza, 1996
- Belostoma candidulum Montandon, 1903
- Belostoma carajaensis Ribeiro and Estévez, 2009
- Belostoma columbiae Lauck, 1962
- Belostoma confusum Lauck, 1959
- Belostoma costalimai De Carlo, 1938
- Belostoma cummingsi De Carlo, 1935
- Belostoma dallasi De Carlo, 1930
- Belostoma dentatum Mayr, 1863
- Belostoma denticolle Montandon, 1903
- Belostoma dilatatum Dufour, 1863
- Belostoma discretum Montandon, 1903
- Belostoma doesburgi De Carlo, 1966
- Belostoma elegans Mayr, 1871
- Belostoma ellipticum Latreille, 1817
- Belostoma elegans Mayr, 1871
- Belostoma elongatum Montandon, 1908
- Belostoma estevezae Ribeiro and Alecrim, 2008
- Belostoma fakir Gistl, 1848
- Belostoma fittkaui De Carlo, 1966
- Belostoma flumineum Say, 1832
- Belostoma foveolatum Mayr, 1863
- Belostoma fusciventre Dufour, 1863
- Belostoma grande Amyot & Audinet-Serville, 1843
- Belostoma gestroi Montandon, 1900
- Belostoma guianae Lauck, 1962
- Belostoma harrisi Lauck, 1962
- Belostoma hirsutum Roback and Nieser, 1974
- Belostoma horvathi Montandon, 1903
- Belostoma husseyi De Carlo, 1960
- Belostoma lariversi De Carlo, 1960
- Belostoma lutarium Stål, 1855
- Belostoma machrisi De Carlo, 1962
- Belostoma malkini Lauck, 1962
- Belostoma martinezi De Carlo, 1957
- Belostoma martini Montandon, 1899
- Belostoma menkei De Carlo, 1960
- Belostoma micantulum Stål, 1860
- Belostoma minor Palisot de Beauvois, 1820
- Belostoma minusculum Uhler, 1884
- Belostoma nessimiani Ribeiro and Alecrim, 2008
- Belostoma nicaeum Estévez and J. Polhemus, 2007
- Belostoma noualhieri Montandon, 1903
- Belostoma orbiculatum Estévez and J. Polhemus, 2001
- Belostoma oxyurum Dufour, 1863
- Belostoma parvoculum Lauck, 1964
- Belostoma parvum Estévez and J. Polhemus, 2007
- Belostoma plebejum Stål, 1860
- Belostoma porteri De Carlo, 1942
- Belostoma pseudoguianae Roback and Nieser, 1974
- Belostoma pygmeum Dufour, 1863
- Belostoma retusum Estévez and J. Polhemus, 2001
- Belostoma ribeiroi De Carlo, 1933
- Belostoma sanctulum Montandon, 1903
- Belostoma saratogae Menke, 1958
- Belostoma sattleri De Carlo, 1966
- Belostoma sayagoi De Carlo, 1966
- Belostoma stollii Amyot & Audinet-Serville, 1843
- Belostoma subspinosum Palisot, 1820
- Belostoma testaceopallidum Latreille, 1807
- Belostoma testaceum Leidy, 1847
- Belostoma thomasi Lauck, 1959
- Belostoma triangulum Lauck, 1964
- Belostoma uhleri Montandon, 1897
- Belostoma venezuelae Lauck, 1962

Data sources: i = ITIS, c = Catalogue of Life, g = GBIF, b = Bugguide.net
