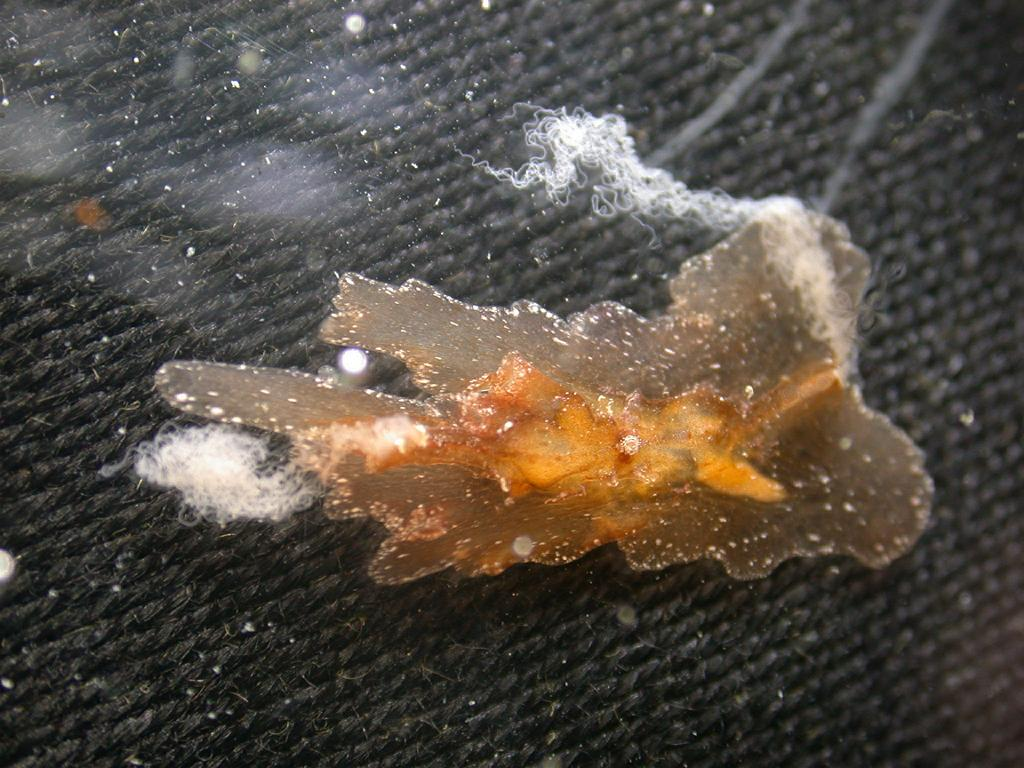
- Coeloplana willeyi

Scientific classification
- Kingdom: Animalia
- Phylum: Ctenophora
- Class: Tentaculata
- Order: Platyctenida
- Family: Coeloplanidae; Willey, 1896
- Genus: Coeloplana; Kowalevsky, 1880

Species
- See text

= Coeloplana =

Genus of comb jellies

Coeloplana is a genus of ctenophores (comb jellies), and are marine invertebrates. It is the only genus in the monotypic family Coeloplanidae. Species include:

- Coeloplana agniae Dawydoff, 1930
- Coeloplana anthostella Song & Hwang, 2010
- Coeloplana astericola Mortensen, 1927
- Coeloplana bannwarthii Krumbach, 1933
- Coeloplana bocki Komai, 1920
- Coeloplana duboscqui Dawydoff, 1930
- Coeloplana echinicola Tanaka, 1932
- Coeloplana fishelsoni Alamaru, Brokovich & Loya, 2015
- Coeloplana gonoctena Krempf, 1920
- Coeloplana huchonae Alamaru, Brokovich & Loya, 2015
- Coeloplana indica Devanesen and Varadarajan, 1942
- Coeloplana komaii Utinomi, 1963
- Coeloplana krusadiensis Devanesen and Varadarajan, 1942
- Coeloplana lineolata Fricke, 1970
- Coeloplana loyai Alamaru & Brokovich, 2015
- Coeloplana mellosa Gershwin, Zeidler & Davie, 2010
- Coeloplana mesnili Dawydoff, 1938
- Coeloplana metschnikowii Kowalevsky, 1880
- Coeloplana mitsukurii Abbott, 1902
- Coeloplana perrieri Dawydoff, 1930
- Coeloplana punctata Fricke, 1970
- Coeloplana reichelti Gershwin, Zeidler & Davie, 2010
- Coeloplana scaberiae Matsumoto and Gowlett-Holmes, 1996
- Coeloplana sophiae Dawydoff, 1938
- Coeloplana tattersalli Devanesen and Varadarajan, 1942
- Coeloplana thomsoni Matsumoto, 1999
- Coeloplana waltoni Glynn, 2014
- Coeloplana weilli Dawydoff, 1938
- Coeloplana willeyi Abbott, 1902, an epizoite of sea cucumbers
- Coeloplana wuennenbergi Fricke, 1970
- Coeloplana yulianicorum Alamaru, Brokovich & Loya, 2015
