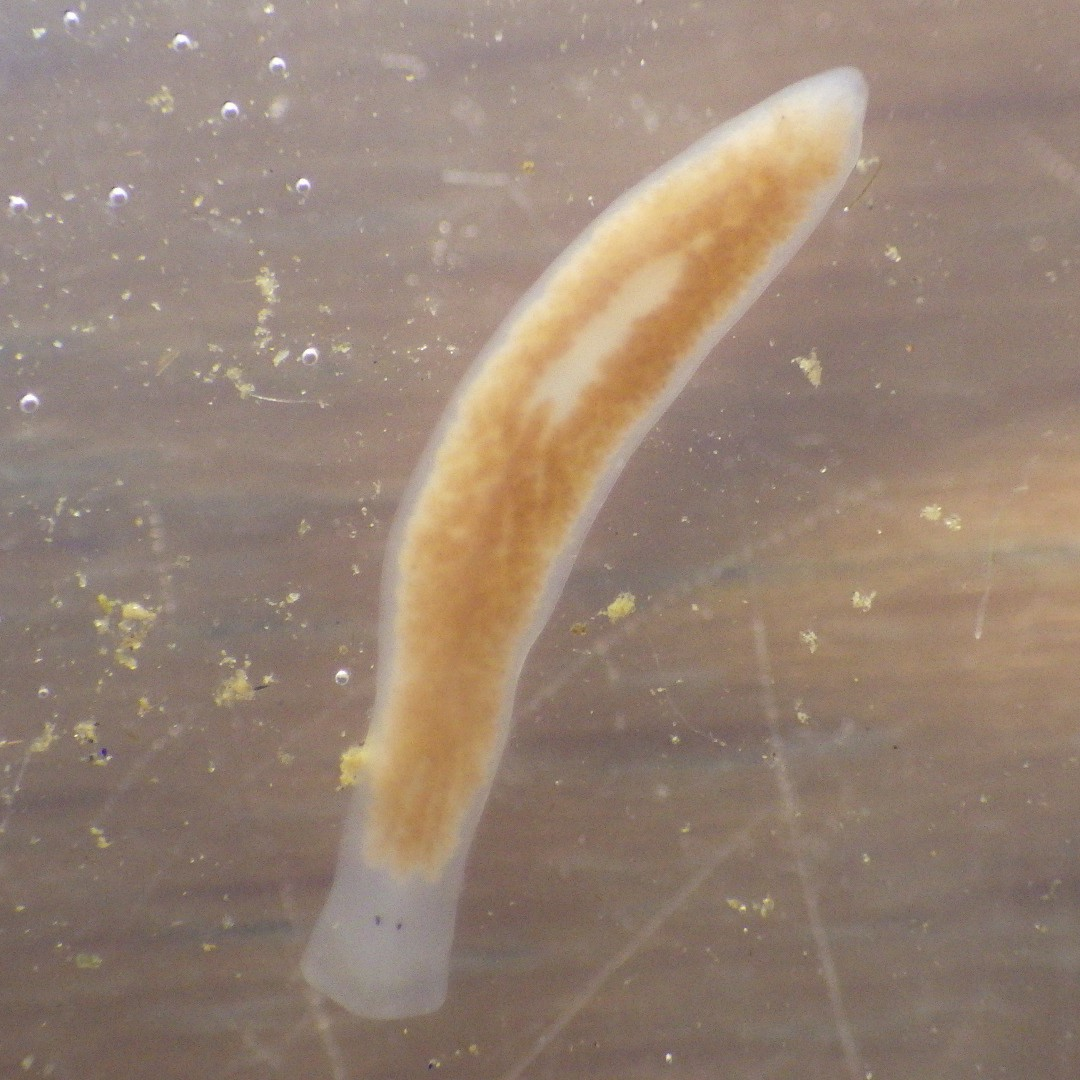
- Phagocata morgani

Scientific classification
- Kingdom: Animalia
- Phylum: Platyhelminthes
- Order: Tricladida
- Family: Planariidae
- Genus: Phagocata; Leidy, 1847

Species
- See text

Synonyms
- Albiplanaria Komarek, 1926; Albioplanaria Kawakatsu, 1966 [literature misspelling]; Fonticola Komarek, 1926; Fondicola Buchanan, 1936 [literature misspelling]; Penecurva Livanov & Zabusova, 1940

= Phagocata =

Genus of flatworms

Phagocata is a genus of planariid triclad.

== Description ==
Members of the genus are oblong and plano-convex in shape, contractile, and mucous, with auricles on its front. It has two ventral pores: one for the mouth and one for the genitalia. The genus is defined by its abundance of proboscises, with the type species having been described as having "not less than twenty-three".

== Species ==
The following species are recognised in the genus Phagocata:

- Phagocata albata Ichikawa & Kawakatsu, 1962
- Phagocata albissima (Vejdovsky, 1883)
- Phagocata altaica (Livanov & Zabusova, 1940)
- Phagocata angusta Kenk, 1977
- Phagocata arethusa (Dalyell, 1814)
- Phagocata armeniaca (Komarek, 1916)
- Phagocata asymmetrica Vila-Farré & Sluys, 2011
- Phagocata bosniaca (Stankovic, 1926)
- Phagocata bulbosa Kenk, 1970
- Phagocata bursaperforata Darlington, 1959
- Phagocata carolinensis Kenk, 1979
- Phagocata cavernicola Hyman, 1954
- Phagocata coarctica (Arndt, 1920)
- Phagocata cornuta Chichoff, 1903
- Phagocata coronata Girard, 1891
- Phagocata crenophila Carpenter, 1969
- Phagocata dalmatica (Stankovic & Komarek, 1927)
- Phagocata delamarei (Gourbault, 1969)
- Phagocata fawcetti Ball & Gourbault, 1975
- Phagocata flamenca Vila-Farré & Sluys, 2011
- Phagocata fontinalis (Sabussow, 1903)
- Phagocata gallaeciae Vila-Farré & Sluys, 2011
- Phagocata gracilis (Haldeman, 1840)
- Phagocata graeca Vila-Farré & Sluys, 2011
- Phagocata hamptonae Kenk, 1982
- Phagocata hellenica Vila-Farré & Sluys, 2011
- Phagocata holleri Kenk, 1979
- Phagocata illyrica (Komarek, 1919)
- Phagocata iwamai Ichikawa & Kawakatsu, 1962
- Phagocata kawakatsui Okugawa, 1956
- Phagocata leptophallus (Reisinger, 1963)
- Phagocata macedonica (Stankovic, 1926)
- Phagocata maculata (Stankovic, 1938)
- Phagocata mesorchis (Livanov & Zabusova, 1940)
- Phagocata monopharyngea Hyman, 1945
- Phagocata morgani (Stevens & Boring, 1906)
- Phagocata nivea Kenk, 1953
- Phagocata nordeni Kenk, 1977
- Phagocata notadena (de Beauchamp, 1937)
- Phagocata notorchis Kenk, 1987
- Phagocata ochridana (Stankovic & Komarek, 1927)
- Phagocata olivacea (Schmidt, 1861)
- Phagocata opisthogona (Kenk, 1936)
- Phagocata papillifera (Ijima & Kaburaki, 1916)
- Phagocata paravitta (Reisinger, 1923)
- Phagocata paravittoides (Livanov & Zabusova, 1940)
- Phagocata pellucida (Ijima & Kaburaki, 1916)
- Phagocata procera Kenk, 1984
- Phagocata prosorchis (Kenk, 1937)
- Phagocata pygmaea Kenk, 1987
- Phagocata pyrenaica Vila-Farré & Sluys, 2011
- Phagocata racovitzai (de Beauchamp, 1928)
- Phagocata sibirica (Sabussow, 1903)
- Phagocata spuria Kenk, 1987
- Phagocata stankovici (Reisinger, 1960)
- Phagocata subterranea Hyman, 1937
- Phagocata suginoi Kawakatsu, 1974
- Phagocata tahoena Kawakatsu, 1968
- Phagocata teletzkiana (Livanov & Zabusova, 1940)
- Phagocata tenella Ichikawa & Kawakatsu, 1963
- Phagocata teshirogi Ichikawa & Kawakatsu, 1962
- Phagocata tigrina (Girard, 1850)
- Phagocata tshukotica Porfirieva, 1980
- Phagocata ullala Sluys, Ribas & Baguna, 1995
- Phagocata undulata (Stankovic, 1960)
- Phagocata velata (Stringer, 1909)
- Phagocata vernalis Kenk, 1944
- Phagocata virilis Kenk, 1977
- Phagocata vitta (Duges, 1830)
- Phagocata vivida (Ijima & Kaburaki, 1916)
- Phagocata woodworthi Hyman, 1937
