= Ctenoplana =

Scientific classification
- Kingdom: Animalia
- Phylum: Ctenophora
- Class: Tentaculata
- Order: Platyctenida
- Family: Ctenoplanidae; Willey, 1896
- Genus: Ctenoplana; Korotneff, 1886

Species
- See text.

Genus of comb jellies

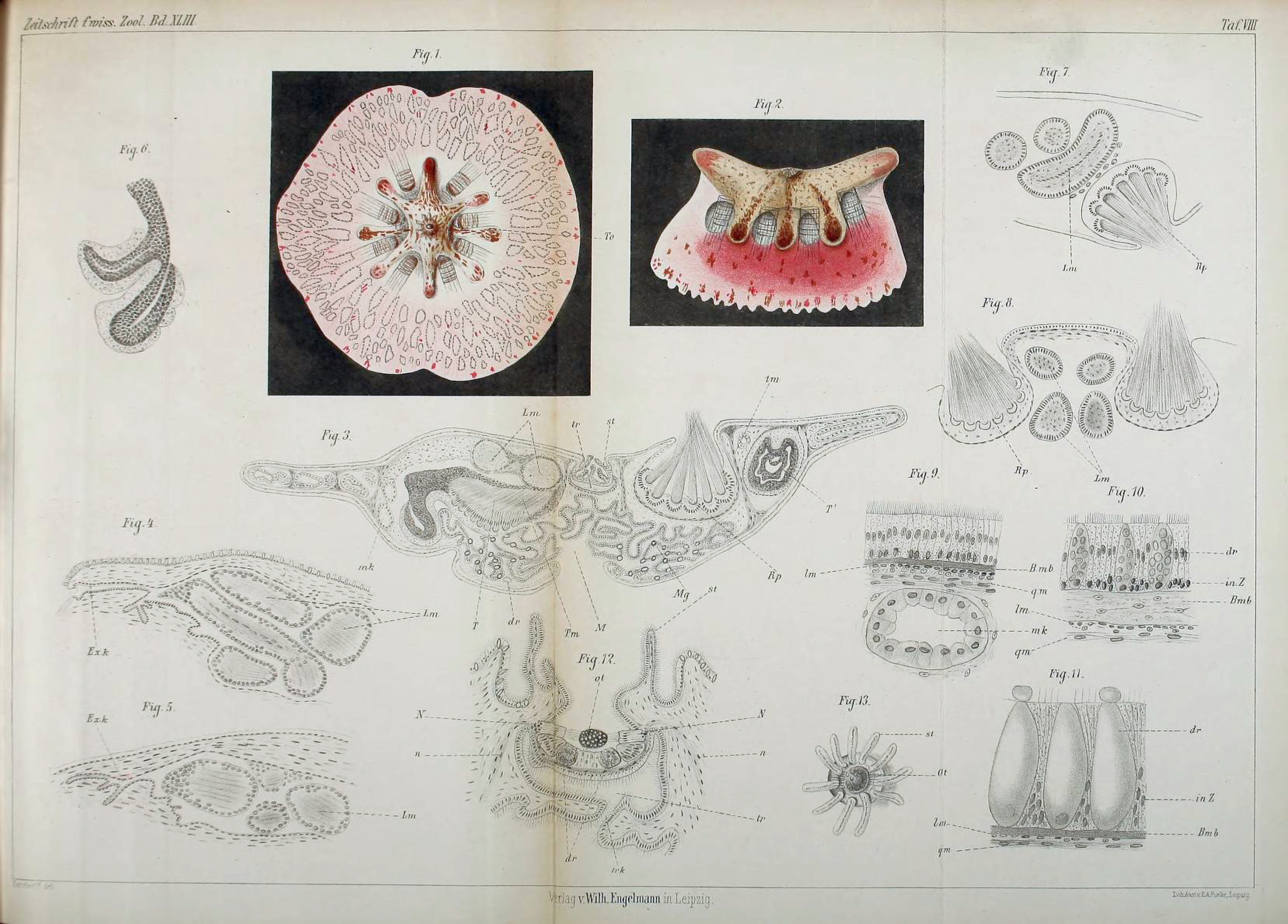
Diagrams of Ctenoplana kowalevskii

Ctenoplana is a genus of comb jellies, and the only genus in the family Ctenoplanidae. It comprises the following species:

- Ctenoplana agnae (Dawydoff, 1929)
- Ctenoplana bengalensis Gnanamuthu and Nair, 1948
- Ctenoplana caulleryi Dawydoff, 1936
- Ctenoplana duboscqui Dawydoff, 1929
- Ctenoplana korotneffi Willey, 1896
- Ctenoplana kowalevskii Korotneff, 1886
- Ctenoplana maculomarginata (Yoshi, 1933)
- Ctenoplana muculosa (Yoshi, 1933)
- Ctenoplana neritica Fricke & Plante, 1971
- Ctenoplana perrieri (Dawydoff, 1930)
- Ctenoplana rosacea Willey, 1896
- Ctenoplana yurii (Dawydoff, 1929)
