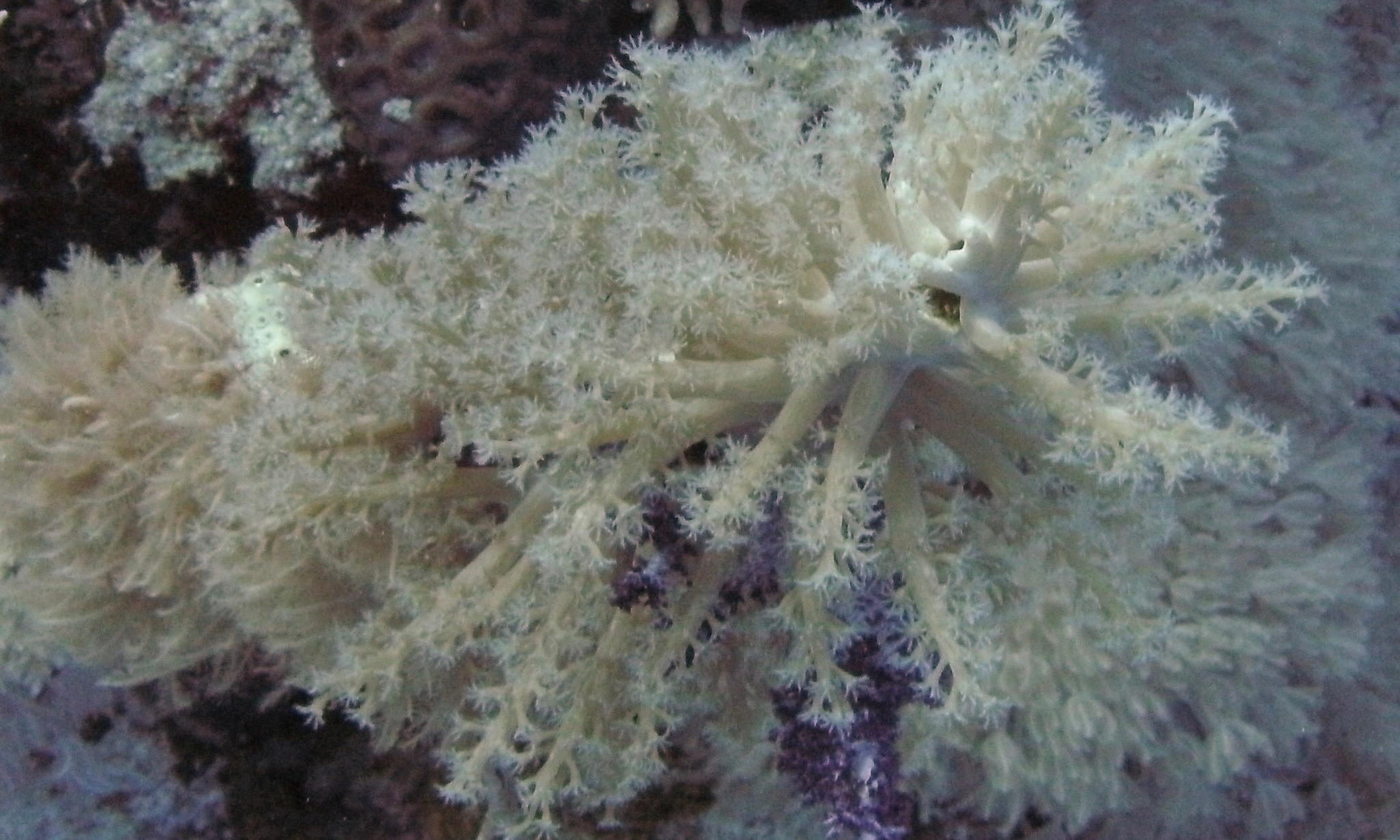

Scientific classification
- Kingdom: Animalia
- Phylum: Cnidaria
- Subphylum: Anthozoa
- Class: Octocorallia
- Order: Malacalcyonacea
- Family: Lemnaliidae
- Genus: Paralemnalia; Kükenthal, 1913

= Paralemnalia =

Genus of corals

Paralemnalia is a genus of corals belonging to the family Lemnaliidae.

The species of this genus are found in Africa, Malesia and Australia.

Species:

- Paralemnalia clavata Verseveldt, 1969
- Paralemnalia digitiformis Macfadyen, 1936
- Paralemnalia eburnea Kükenthal, 1913
- Paralemnalia flabella (Quoy & Gaimard, 1833)
- Paralemnalia pichoni Tixier-Durivault, 1972
- Paralemnalia thyrsoides (Ehrenberg, 1834)
