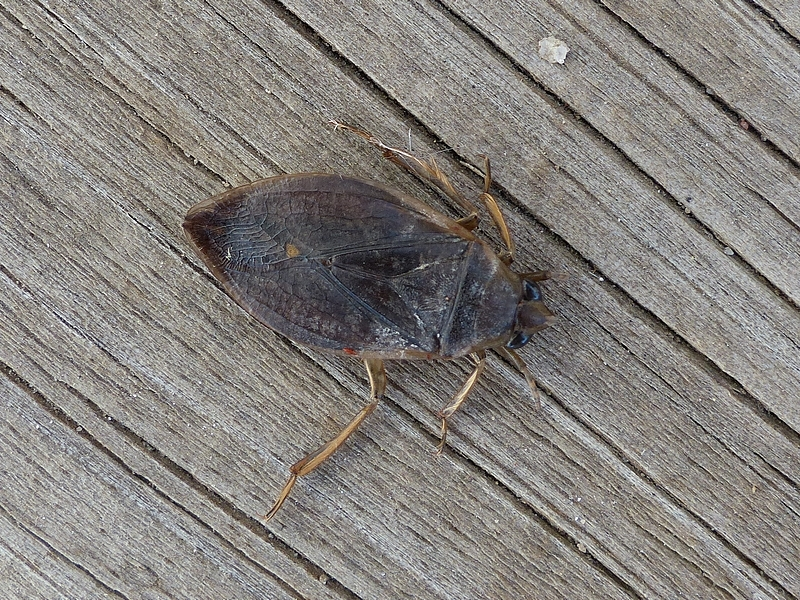

Scientific classification
- Domain: Eukaryota
- Kingdom: Animalia
- Phylum: Arthropoda
- Class: Insecta
- Order: Hemiptera
- Suborder: Heteroptera
- Family: Belostomatidae
- Genus: Belostoma
- Species: B. flumineum

Binomial name
- Belostoma flumineum Say, 1832

= Belostoma flumineum =

Species of true bug

Belostoma flumineum is a North American species of giant water bug (family Belostomatidae). They are a common predator in ponds and wetlands. They are relatively large, reaching 2–2.5 cm (0.79–0.98 in) in length. As with other species of the Belostomatidae family, the fathers take care of the offspring. Exclusive paternal care has been the focus of many studies done on this species. Other studies have been done on food webs and predation pressure using this species because they are an apex predator (among invertebrates) in their preferred habitats.

== Morphology ==
Ovoid-elongate in body shape that is dorsoventrally flattened and brown in coloration. They can range 2–2.5 cm (0.79–0.98 in) in length. B.flumineum are insects so naturally have six legs although the front two are strong raptorial legs for catching and holding prey in a vice grip. The other four legs are slightly flattened and used for swimming. The mouth parts consist of a stout syringe-like rostrum or beak and long piercing stylets that were once mandibles and maxillae. They also have retractable strap-like appendages that allow for snorkeling while under water which are located on the posterior end of the abdomen. They have large eyes, but lack oceli, which are small light-detecting sensory organs.

== Habitat and ecology ==
Belostoma flumineum are commonly found in wetlands, marshes and ponds throughout North America. They live among weeds and like ponds with muddy bottoms which are good for over wintering in. Common species that B. flumineum prey upon are backswimmers, water boatmen, dragonfly nymphs, and snails. While they do not regularly participate in cannibalism they will attack smaller individuals of the same species. Reproduction in this species has 2 phases, a fall cycle and a spring cycle, where in the fall they are young breeders and in spring they are over wintered adults.

== Paternal care ==
Belostoma flumineum females lay their eggs on the backs of their mates and from this point onward it is the males' job to care for them until they hatch in 7–14 days. Males can carry up to 100 eggs on their backs at once. Males care for their eggs by making sure the eggs get enough oxygen and protection from predators. Since the eggs are so large, they cannot stay submerged underwater and use diffusion to absorb oxygen available in the water. The males must remain at the air-water interface so that the eggs are provided with enough oxygen, this behavior is called air brooding. Brood pumping and brood stroking are another behavior males do to increase the water flow over the eggs for better oxygen access. Even though males care for the eggs, they will still discard them depending on the egg pad size, age of the male, and the presence of females. It has also been found that males with small egg pads have a temperature-dependent discard rate because cooler temperatures mark the end of breeding season; at cool temperatures, they are less likely to discard a small egg pad compared to warmer temperatures.

== Research ==
There have been a number of studies done using this species of water bug. Food web and habitat studies have used B. flumineum as the predation pressure for tadpoles and observed the difference between vegetated areas and non vegetated areas when looking at the survival rate of tadpoles. They found that the tadpoles survived better in highly vegetated area even though those areas tended to have more predators in them. Other studies used B. flumineum as a predation pressure on snails to see if they would change their susceptibility though ontogeny, and as a stress inducer on amphibians to see if that would make them more susceptible to disease. The other main area of research done using this species was on factors that influence paternal care. Crowl and Alexander studied the potential costs of males brooding, specifically if brooding affected their ability to forage for food. They did get results that suggested that brooding males could not catch faster prey, such as small fish, as well as females or non-brooding males could and thus it does have a foraging effect. Gilg and Kruse wanted to test if reproduction decreased life span and they chose B. flumineum because both the female and male have relatively high costs of reproduction. The females require a lot of energy to make such large eggs and then the males spend energy brooding eggs and are more exposed to predators. They did find statistically significant differences between the life spans of virgin and breeding in both males and females.
