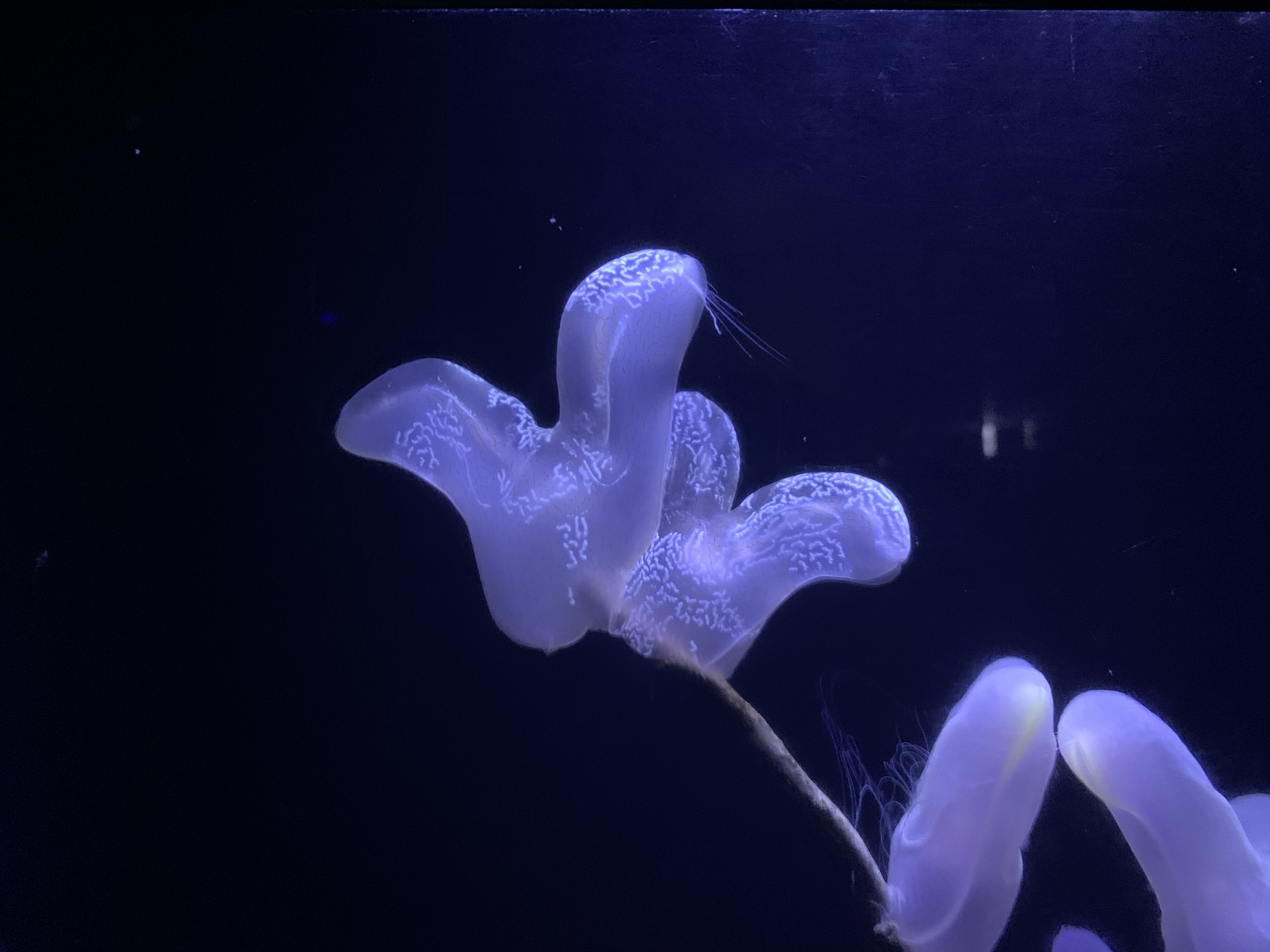
- Lyrocteis imperatoris

Scientific classification
- Kingdom: Animalia
- Phylum: Ctenophora
- Class: Tentaculata
- Order: Platyctenida
- Family: Lyroctenidae; Komai, 1942
- Genus: Lyrocteis; Komai, 1941

Type species
- Lyrocteis imperatoris Komai, 1941

Species
- See text.

= Lyrocteis =

Genus of comb jellies

Lyrocteis is a genus of benthic comb jellies. It is the only genus in the monotypic family Lyroctenidae.

== Morphology ==
The individuals are rather large benthic ctenophores (up to 15 cm) in the shape of a lyre. They have a basal body and two curved outgrowths, from which the fishing filaments emanate, which they use to capture their planktonic food.

== Species ==
The genus comprises the following species:

- Lyrocteis flavopallidus Robilliard and Dayton, 1972
- Lyrocteis imperatoris Komai, 1941
