= Pseudobranch =

Part of the gills of a fish

The pseudobranch, also pseudobranchia, is the reduced first gill arch of a fish (on the inner surface of the opercle, near the junction of the preopercle) as well as a reduced "false" gill in some gastropods.

In teleost fish, the pseudobranchs are mostly without respiratory function, and in elasmobranchs they are the gill arch of the spiracle. The function of the pseudobranch is unknown, but it is believed that it supplies highly oxygenated blood to the optic choroid and retina and may have baroreceptor (pressure) and thermoregulation functions. It may also be a site of oxygen chemoreception.
