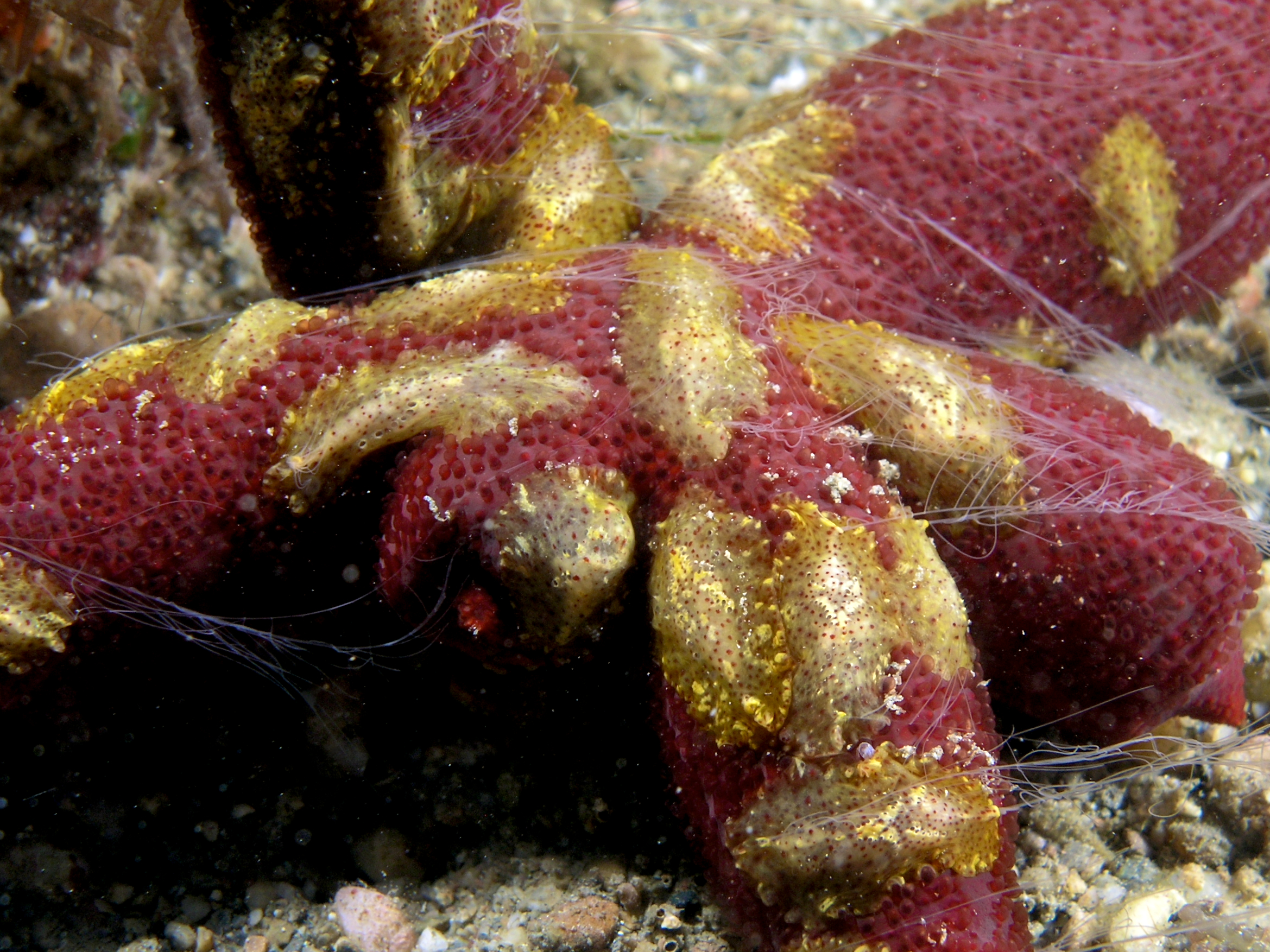
- Coeloplana astericola on the surface of a seastar

Scientific classification
- Kingdom: Animalia
- Phylum: Ctenophora
- Class: Tentaculata
- Order: Platyctenida; Bourne, 1900

Families
- Benthoplanidae Bezio, Paulay & Collins, 2025; Coeloplanidae Willey, 1896; Ctenoplanidae Willey, 1896; Lyroctenidae Komai, 1942; Savangiidae Harbison & Madin, 1982; Tjalfiellidae Komai, 1922

= Platyctenida =

Order of benthic ctenophores

Platyctenida, also known as benthic comb jellies, is an order of comb jellies in the class Tentaculata. Platyctenids display a generally benthic lifestyle in contrast to most ctenophores being largely pelagic. Platyctenids display widely differing morphological characteristics from their pelagic counterparts, being highly flattened on their oral-aboral axis and having lost many key traits associated with the phylum.

== Taxonomy ==
Platyctenida is the only benthic group of organisms in the phylum Ctenophora. Platyctenida are considered to be a phylogenetically young group along with the orders Lobata and Beroida and are believed to have stemmed from an ancestral version of the order Cydippida, after some kind of bottleneck effect in the phylum. This has been supported by strong morphological and developmental data, specifically the sharing of what has been termed a "Cydippida-like" larva form in all 4 orders. Platyctenida is thought to be a polyphyletic group.

Research has shown that Ctenoplana neritica is just the early life stage of Benthoplana meteoris, and that the remaining members of Ctenoplanidae could also represent the early life history stages of Coeloplanidae and possibly other platyctenes.

== Description ==
Ranging in size 15 cm and below, they have dorso-ventrally flattened, oval and secondarily bilaterally symmetrical bodies. Platyctenids look very much like nudibranchs or flatworms and are often confused for them. All but one species of platyctenids lack the iconic ctene rows (the ciliated comb-rows) that distinguishes the ctenophores but they still possess the pair of tentilla-bearing tentacles and adhesive collocytes that also characterize the phylum in pores along the dorsal surface. They cling to and creep on surfaces by everting the pharynx and using it as a muscular "foot".

They are usually cryptically colored, live on the seabed and rocks, and as epibionts on other benthic organisms like algae, soft coral, and other invertebrates; primarily certain species of cnidarians and echinoderms (primarily the genus Coeloplana sp.). They are often revealed by their long tentacles with many side branches, seen streaming off the back of the animal into the current. They tend to be ectosymbiotic with the organisms they live on.

Whereas most ctenophores are hermaphroditic, certain platyctenids have been found to be asexual, and furthermore, where other ctenophores have been found to reproduce using external fertilization, certain species of platyctenids have been found to use brood pouches.
