= Motherhood (disambiguation) =

Motherhood is the state of being a mother.

Motherhood may also refer to:

- Motherhood (1917 film), an American lost silent drama film
- Motherhood: Life's Greatest Miracle, 1925 American film
- Motherhood (1935 film), a French drama film
- Motherhood (1945 film), a Swedish drama film
- Motherhood (2009 film), an American independent comedy-drama film
- Motherhood (2022 Japanese film), a Japanese psychological thriller drama film directed by Ryuichi Hiroki
- Motherhood (2022 Spanish film), a Spanish teen drama film directed by Pilar Palomero
- "Motherhood" (Xena episode), an episode of the television series Xena: Warrior Princess
- Motherhood, an apparel brand name of Motherhood Maternity Inc.
- "Motherhood" (ER), an episode of the television series ER

== See also ==
- Maternity (disambiguation)
- Fatherhood (disambiguation)
- Parenthood (disambiguation)
