= Fatherhood (disambiguation) =

Fatherhood may mean:

- being a father, a male parent of a child
- Fatherhood (album), a 1995 album by the British musician Stephen Jones
- Fatherhood (book), a 1986 bestselling book by Bill Cosby
- Fatherhood (TV series), a United States animated television series
- Father Hood, a 1993 comedy film starring Patrick Swayze
- Fatherhood (film), a 2021 American drama film
- Snoop Dogg's Father Hood, a 2007 reality show starring rapper Snoop Dogg
