= Maternal care =

Maternal care may refer to:

in humans:

- Obstetrics, medical specialty concerning pregnancy and childbirth
- Midwifery, healthcare provided during and following pregnancy
- Postpartum care, healthcare provided to a mother following birth
- Maternal sensitivity, a woman's attention to her infant

in other animals:

- Parental care of offspring provided by female organisms
- Maternal investment, female strategies in evolutionary biology

== See also ==
- Paternal care, care provided by male parents
- Parenting
- Maternity hospital
- Maternity (disambiguation)
