= Metapsychology =

Psychological aspect

Metapsychology (from meta- 'beyond, transcending' and psychology) is that aspect of a psychoanalytic theory that discusses the terms that are essential to it, but leaves aside or transcends the phenomena that the theory deals with. Psychology refers to the concrete conditions of the human psyche, metapsychology to psychology itself (cf. the comparison of metaphysics and physics).

== Overview ==
The term is used mostly in discourse about psychoanalysis, the psychology developed by Sigmund Freud. In general, his metapsychology represents a technical elaboration of his structural model of the psyche, which divides the organism into three instances: the id is considered the germ from which the ego and the superego emerge. Driven by an energy that Freud called libido in direct reference to Plato's Eros, the instances complement each other through their specific functions in a similar way to the parts of a microscope or organelles of a cell. More precisely defined, metapsychology describes ‘a way of observation in which every psychic process is analysed according to the three coordinates of dynamics, topics and economy’. Topology refers to the arrangement of these processes in space, dynamics to their movements (variability, also in time) and economy to the energetic reservoir (libido) that drives all life processes, is used up during this and therefore needs to be replenished through nutrition.

These precise concepts led Freud to say that their unified presentation would make it possible to achieve the highest goal of psychology, namely, the development of a comprehensively founded model of health. Such an idea is crucial for the diagnostic process because illnesses – the treatment and prevention of which is the focus of all medical activity – can only be recognised in contrast to or as deviations from a state of health.

Freud left this central part of his work to future analysts in the unfinished state of a torso, since – as he stated – the fields of knowledge required to complete metapsychology were barely developed or did not exist in the first half of the 20th century. This refers above all to ethological primate research and its extension to the field of anthropology. Freud considers findings from these areas of knowledge to be indispensable because without them it is not possible to examine and, where necessary, correct his hypothesis of natural social coexistence in the primordial horde postulated by Darwin (see presented for discussion in Totem and Taboo). The same applies to the hypothetical abolition of horde life through the introduction of monogamy by a corresponding agreement among the sons who killed the primal father of the horde. For the same reasons, Freud's claim also extends to the assumed origin of moral codes of behavior (totemism), the differentiation of sexual from social and intellectual needs (instinctively formed communities versus consciously conceived political superstructures; foundations of belief and knowledge systems), and much more. In Moses and Monotheism, the author refers one last time to the lack of primate research at the time.

The empirical foundations of Freudian metapsychology are neurological processes and close relationships to Darwin's theory of evolution. The libidinal energy, which according to this metapsychology drives all biological and mental processes through its inherent desire, represents in a certain sense a teleological thesis.

More recently, it is regarded as a hermeneutics of understanding with relations to Freud's literary sources, especially Sophocles, and, to a lesser extent, Goethe and Shakespeare. Interest on the possible scientific status of psychoanalysis has been renewed in the emerging discipline of neuropsychoanalysis, whose major exemplar is Mark Solms. The hermeneutic vision of psychoanalysis is the focus of influential works by Donna Orange.

== Freud and the als ob problem ==
Psychoanalytic metapsychology is concerned with the fundamental structure and concepts of Freudian theory. Sigmund Freud first used the term on 13 February 1896 in a letter to Wilhelm Fliess, to refer to his addition of unconscious processes to the conscious ones of traditional psychology. On March 10, 1898, he wrote to Fliess: "It seems to me that (German: als ob) the theory of wish fulfillment has brought only the psychological solution and not the biological – or, rather, metapsychical – one. (I am going to ask you seriously, by the way, whether I may use the name metapsychology for my psychology that leads behind consciousness)."

Three years after completing his unpublished Project for a Scientific Psychology, Freud's optimism had completely vanished. In a letter dated September 22 of that year, he told Fliess: "I am not at all in disagreement with you, not at all inclined to leave psychology hanging in the air without an organic basis. But apart from this conviction, I do not know how to go on, neither theoretically nor therapeutically, and therefore must behave as if [als läge] only the psychological were under consideration. Why I cannot fit it together [the organic and the psychological] I have not even begun to fathom". "When, in his 'Autobiographical Study' of 1925, Freud called his metapsychology a 'speculative superstructure'...the elements of which could be abandoned or changed once proven inadequate, he was, in the terminology of Kant's Critique of Judgment, proposing a psychology als ob or as if – a heuristic model of mental functioning that did not necessarily correspond with external reality."

A salient example of Freud's own metapsychology is his characterization of psychoanalysis as a "simultaneously closed system, fundamentally unrelated and impervious to the external world and as an open system inherently connected and responsive to environmental influence.

In the 1910s, Freud wrote a series of twelve essays, to be collected as Preliminaries to a Metapsychology. Five of these were published independently under the titles: "Instincts and Their Vicissitudes," "Repression," "The Unconscious," "A Metapsychological Supplement to the Theory of Dreams," and "Mourning and Melancholia." The remaining seven remained unpublished, an expression of Freud's ambivalence about his own attempts to articulate the whole of his vision of psychoanalysis. In 1919 he wrote to Lou Andreas-Salome, "Where is my Metapsychology? In the first place it remains unwritten". In 1920 he published Beyond the Pleasure Principle, a text with metaphysical ambitions.

Midcentury psychoanalyst David Rapaport defined the term thus: "Books on psychoanalysis usually deal with its clinical theory... there exists, however, a fragmentary—yet consistent—general theory of psychoanalysis, which comprises the premises of the special (clinical) theory, the concepts built on it, and the generalizations derived from it... named metapsychology."

== Freud's metapsychology ==
1. The topographical point of view: the psyche operates at different levels of consciousness – unconscious, preconscious, and conscious
2. The dynamic point of view: the notion that there are psychological forces which may conflict with one another at work in the psyche
3. The economic point of view: the psyche contains charges of energy which are transferred from one element of the psyche to another
4. The structural point of view: the psyche consists of configurations of psychological processes which operate in different ways and reveal different rates of change – the ego, the id, and the superego
5. The genetic point of view: the origins – or "genesis" – of psychological processes can be found in developmentally previous psychological processes

Ego psychologist Heinz Hartmann also added 'the adaptive" point of view' to Freud's metapsychology, although Lacan who interpreted metapsychology as the symbolic, the Real, and the imaginary, said "the dimension discovered by analysis is the opposite of anything which progresses through adaptation."

== Criticism ==
Freud's metapsychology has faced criticism, mainly from ego psychology. Object relations theorists, such as Melanie Klein, shifted the focus away from intrapsychic conflicts and towards the dynamics of interpersonal relationships, leading to a unifocal theory of development that focused on the mother-child relationship. Most ego psychologists saw the structural point of view, Freud's latest metapsychology, as the most important. Some proposed that only the structural point of view be kept in metapsychology, because the topographical point of view made an unnecessary distinction between the unconscious and the preconscious (Arlow & Brenner) and because the economic point of view was viewed as redundant (Gill).

== See also ==
- Philosophy of mind
