= Douglas Watt (psychologist) =

American psychologist (born 1950)

Douglas F. Watt is an American clinical neuropsychologist whose work has focused on bridging clinical neuroscience, affective neuroscience, and psychoanalysis. His work focuses on outlining relationships between brain function and neural systems and the psychological domains of emotion, cognition, and behavior. His research and scholarly writing have focused on the neural and neurobiological substrates of consciousness, emotion, empathy, depression, neurodegenerative disorders, and the potential integration and dialogue between psychoanalytic and neuroscientific approaches to mental and emotional processes.

== Early life and education ==
Watt was a National Merit Finalist at Kent School, in Kent, Connecticut. He received a Bachelor of Arts, with an independent study in psychology and religion, completing a general studies major from Harvard College in 1972, graduating cum laude. He later received a Master of Education degree in Community Mental Health Counseling Psychology from Northeastern University in 1976. His master's thesis examined interdisciplinary perspectives on depression, his first foray into bridging biological and psychological perspectives on depression – an area that was to become a principal focus in later work.

In 1985, Watt received a Ph.D. in counseling psychology from Boston College. His doctoral dissertation, A Critical Analysis of Rorschach Investigations of Borderline and Narcissistic Disorders: A Comparison of Two Groups, examined the use of an empirical scoring system for the Rorschach test in arbitrating issues in psychiatric nosology, specifically around borderline and narcissistic disorders.

He completed a postdoctoral internship in clinical psychology at the Human Resource Institute in Brookline, Massachusetts, specializing in cognitive assessment and furthering his pursuit of psychiatric differential diagnosis, under the supervision of Mel Barton. Watt became a licensed clinical psychologist and healthcare provider in Massachusetts in 1986 and was subsequently qualified as a section 12 psychologist by the Massachusetts Department of Mental Health.

== Career ==
Watt began his clinical training and career in the Boston area, including work at Mystic Valley Mental Health Center and the Human Resource Institute. He held clinical and staff positions at Human Resource Institute facilities in Franklin and Brookline, Massachusetts. He subsequently held medical-staff and allied-health appointments from 1986-2016 at several hospitals in the Boston area, including Malden Hospital, Quincy Medical Center, and Lawrence Memorial Hospital.

Watt served as Clinical Director of Psychology and Neuropsychology at the Malden Hospital Psychiatric Institute and the Quincy Medical Center In-Patient Geropsychiatry Service, both teaching services affiliated with Boston University School of Medicine. At Quincy Medical Center, he was an Instructor in Neuropsychology and Psychiatry at Boston University School of Medicine from 1988 to 2010. He also lectured in psychoanalysis and neuroscience at the Psychoanalytic Institute of New England from 1992 to 1993 and was a member of the core faculty at the Boston Graduate School of Psychoanalysis from 2000 to 2005.

From 2007 to 2014, Watt held a community faculty appointment in psychiatry at Harvard Medical School through Cambridge Health Alliance. He conducted seminars for residents, medical students and clinical staff on the clinical science of depression and neurodegenerative disorders. In 2017–2018, he was an adjunct professor at Lesley University's Graduate School of Psychology, where he taught behavioral neuroscience to doctoral and graduate students.

Watt also participated in peer review for several academic journals, including Frontiers in Aging Neuroscience, Frontiers in Psychiatry and Frontiers in Psychology, reviewing submissions on depression and neurodegenerative disorders. In 2025, he served as chief editor of a special issue of Frontiers in Psychology examining depression through social stress, inflammation, neuromodulation and neural network perspectives.

== Research and scholarly work ==
Watt's work bridges several content areas in neuroscience and psychology, emphasizing interdisciplinary and utilizing systems-neurobiology perspectives. His work has been influenced by the work of Jaak Panksepp on the neural substrates of affect and emotion, the mammalian conservation of primary emotional systems, and the foundational role for organismic value and emotion in grounding the neurology and neurodynamics of consciousness.

=== Psychoanalysis and neuroscience ===
Watt's first two publications in 1986 and 1990 focused on bridging concepts from psychoanalysis and neuroscience, arguing that these domains had been artificially and arbitrarily siloed, ever since the failure of Freud’s Project for a Scientific Psychology. Watt noted that cognitive and behavioral neuroscience work defining both ventral-dorsal brain organization, as well as lateral hemispheric connectivities, had underappreciated alignment with foundational concepts in psychoanalysis. In 1986, he outlined evidence that right hemisphere nonverbal cognition using analogical modes of processing, and distinct from left hemisphere semantic encoding, were the neural substrates for what psychoanalysis had called ‘transference’ – the uncanny ability to view present social situations and persons through the potentially distorting lens of past experiences and trauma. In 1990, he outlined correspondence between connectivities in limbic and cortical areas and psychoanalytic concepts about the ego as an executive process mediating drives and affects. These two publications were among the first efforts to create a hybrid discipline, and reduce the artificial division between psychological and neurobiological viewpoints, scientific efforts now referred to as Neuropsychoanalysis.

=== Empathy and social behavior ===
Watt's work on empathy has examined its evolutionary and neurobiological foundations – that human empathy reflects cognitive extensions of a highly conserved mammalian behavioral phenotype of maternal care. In 2016 Watt and Panksepp also argued that empathy is heavily modulated by other evolutionarily conserved social processes, including being inhibited by the opponent process of dominance and promoted by the agonist processes of attachment and group membership, particularly the in-group out-group boundary. This framework potentially illuminates tribalism, and how these group processes can power common authoritarian movements.

=== Neurodegeneration and aging ===
Watt has also written on the relationship between neurodegenerative disorders and the biology of aging. In 2013, he challenged popular assumptions that attribute neurodegenerative disorders solely or even primarily to the aggregation of specific pathological proteins. He has argued instead that neurodegeneration should be understood as emerging from positive feedback between many age-related biological phenotypes that are heavily interactive, not simply declining proteostasis. These cellular phenotypes of aging include impaired proteostasis/autophagy, but also dysregulated innate immunity, mitochondrial dysfunction, DNA damage, cellular senescence, and disinhibition of the mTOR signaling pathway. This view presaged later work by Lopez-Otin et al (2013) on the Hallmarks of Aging. Watt also emphasized that the failure of most animal models based on transgenic proteinopathy derived directly from this mechanistic oversimplification. These models reliably validate therapeutics narrowly successful only in these animal models, but then consistently fail to be disease-modifying in clinical patients, because the biology of aging has been mechanistically ‘removed’ from the preclinical model. He has argued that this alternative model of neurodegeneration, as based in positive feedback between age-related phenotypes, could better inform neuroprotective strategies. This approach would suggest having multiple biological targets rather than interventions traditionally directed at a single pathological mechanism, approaches still uncritically accepted as standard of care. His work has also emphasized the critical roles of sleep, diet, physical activity, social support, all of which impact the core signaling networks mTOR - AMPK, slow multiple phenotypes or hallmarks of aging, and thus maintain health more effectively.

=== Affective neuroscience and consciousness ===
Watt's work in affective neuroscience has addressed the neglected and mechanistically intimate relationships between emotion, motivation, and consciousness. Drawing on affective neuroscience from the work of Panksepp, he has argued that affective and arousal systems are closely integrated with neural systems involved in conscious processing. In this view, emotional and motivational processes are not secondary features of consciousness but provide core mechanisms on the executive side underlying action, and on the sensory side, underpinning attentional function and salience. These jointly form the foundations for behavioral agency, which is completely collapsed in lesion studies involving components of the ventral brainstem and medial forebrain systems, as seen in akinetic mutism. Watt argues that these are strong evidence for an embodied foundation for consciousness, and support Bjorn Merker’s seminal proposals for a mesodiencepathic foundation for consciousness.

== Selected publications ==
- Watt, Douglas F. (1990). "Higher cortical functions and the ego: Explorations of the boundary between behavioral neurology, neuropsychology, and psychoanalysis". Psychoanalytic Psychology. 7 (4): 487–527. doi:10.1037/0736-9735.7.4.487. ISSN 0736-9735.
- Watt, Douglas F (2002). "Commentary on Professor Hobson's first-person account of a lateral medullary stroke (CVA): Affirmative action for the brainstem in consciousness studies?". Consciousness and Cognition. 11 (3): 391–395. doi:10.1016/s1053-8100(02)00012-0. ISSN 1053-8100. PMID 12435374.
- Watt, Douglas F. (2003). "Consciousness, emotional self-regulation and the brain". Journal of Consciousness Studies. Archived from the original on May 28, 2015.
- Watt, Douglas F. (2005). "Panksepp's common sense view of affective neuroscience is not the commonsense view in large areas of neuroscience". Consciousness and Cognition. 14 (1): 81–88. doi:10.1016/j.concog.2005.01.003. ISSN 1053-8100. PMID 15766891.
- Watt, Douglas F. (2005). "Attachment Mechanisms and the Bridging of Science and Religion: The Challenges of Anthropomorphism and Sect-ism". The Psychoanalytic Review. 92 (2): 191–221. doi:10.1521/prev.92.2.191.62357. ISSN 0033-2836. PMID 15843310.
- Zellner, Margaret R.; Watt, Douglas F.; Solms, Mark; Panksepp, Jaak (2011). "Affective neuroscientific and neuropsychoanalytic approaches to two intractable psychiatric problems: Why depression feels so bad and what addicts really want". Neuroscience & Biobehavioral Reviews. 35 (9): 2000–2008. doi:10.1016/j.neubiorev.2011.01.003. ISSN 0149-7634. PMID 21241736.
- Panksepp, Jaak; Watt, Douglas (2011). "Why Does Depression Hurt? Ancestral Primary-Process Separation-Distress (PANIC/GRIEF) and Diminished Brain Reward (SEEKING) Processes in the Genesis of Depressive Affect". Psychiatry: Interpersonal and Biological Processes. 74 (1): 5–13. doi:10.1521/psyc.2011.74.1.5. ISSN 0033-2747. PMID 21463165.
- Watt, Douglas F. (July 3, 2023). "The separation distress hypothesis of depression – an update and systematic review". Neuropsychoanalysis. 25 (2): 103–159. doi:10.1080/15294145.2023.2240340. ISSN 1529-4145.
- Watt, Douglas F.; Flores Mosri, Daniela; Boag, Simon (April 29, 2025). "Editorial: Depression: social stress, inflammation, neuromodulatory, and neural network perspectives". Frontiers in Psychology. 16 1605688. doi:10.3389/fpsyg.2025.1605688. ISSN 1664-1078. PMC 12070490. PMID 40365626.
