= Douglas Watt =

Douglas Watt may refer to:

- Douglas Watt (critic) (1914–2009), critic for the New York Daily News
- Douglas Watt (politician) (1914–1985), politician in Manitoba, Canada
- Douglas Watt (psychologist) (born 1950), American neuropsychologist

== See also ==
- Robert Watt (officer of arms) (born 1945), also known as Robert Douglas Watt, Canadian museum curator
- Willie Watt (footballer, born 1946), also known as William Douglas Watt, Scottish footballer
