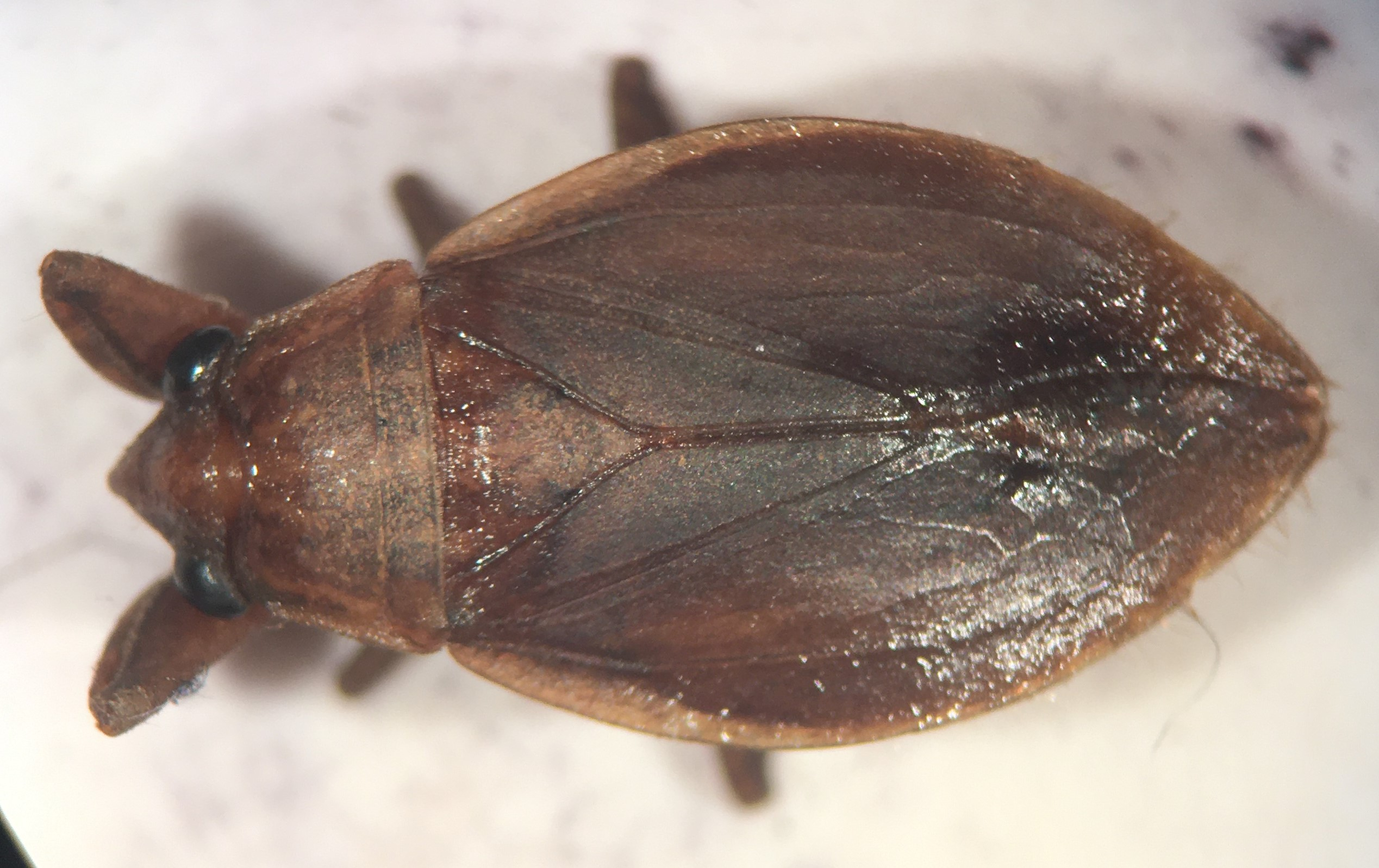

Scientific classification
- Kingdom: Animalia
- Phylum: Arthropoda
- Class: Insecta
- Order: Hemiptera
- Suborder: Heteroptera
- Family: Belostomatidae
- Genus: Abedus
- Species: A. immaculatus

Binomial name
- Abedus immaculatus (Say, 1832)

Synonyms
- Abedus cantralli Hussey and Herring, 1950; Belostoma fluminea immaculata Say, 1832

= Abedus immaculatus =

Species of true bug

Abedus immaculatus is a species of water bug in the family Belostomatidae. It is the only Abedus species found in the eastern United States, occurring throughout Florida north into Georgia and west along the Gulf Coast to Mississippi.

Adults reach lengths of 13–14 mm, making them the smallest species in the genus Abedus, the smallest belostomatid in the United States, and the only species in the subgenus Microabedus. It is locally common in parts of the Everglades, where it is associated with shorter hydroperiod sites.

Abedus immaculatus was originally described by Thomas Say in 1832 as Belostoma fluminea var. immaculata, redescribed as A. cantralli in 1950, with the two names synonymized to A. immaculatus in 1950.
