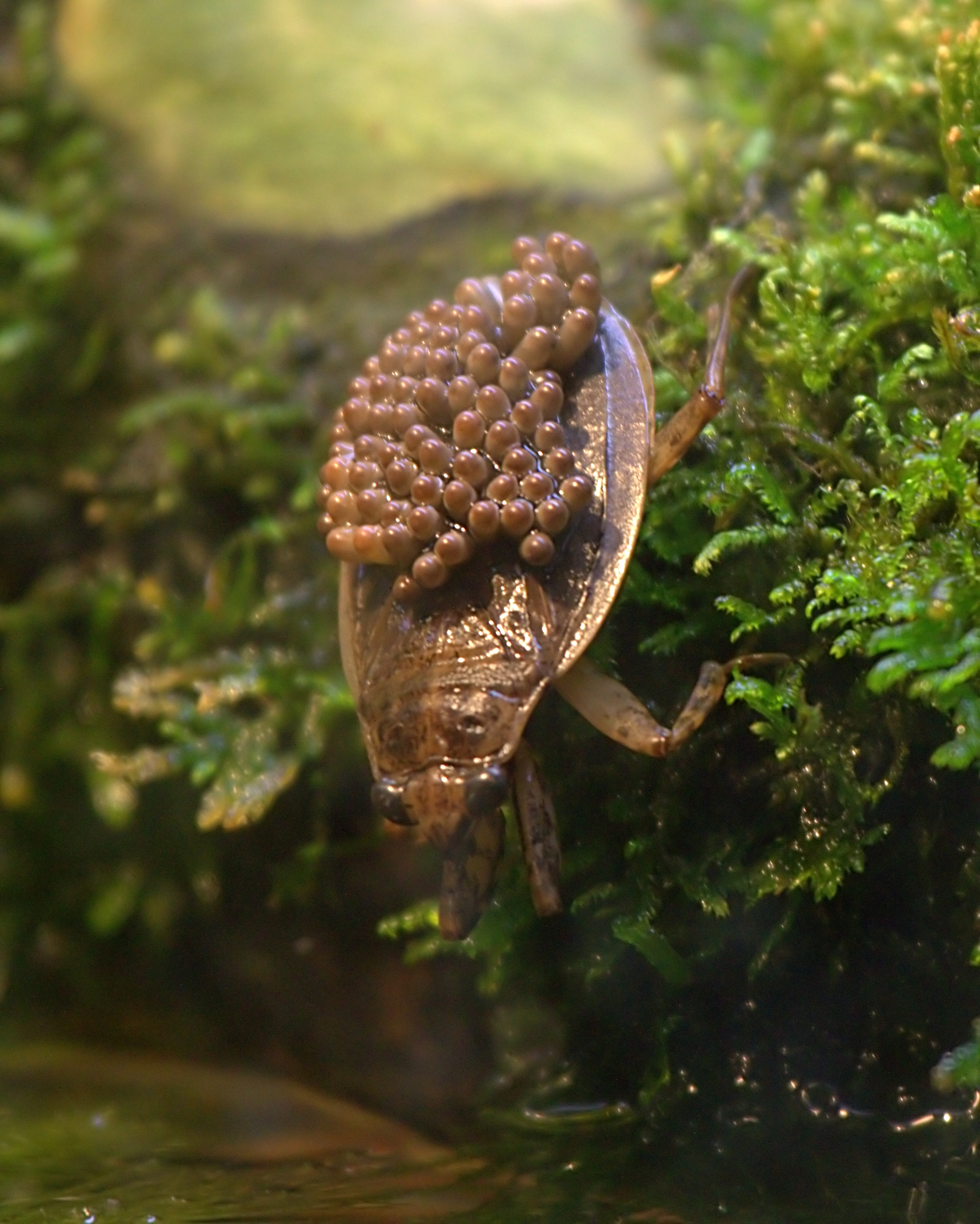
- Male with eggs on his back at the Cincinnati Zoo

Scientific classification
- Domain: Eukaryota
- Kingdom: Animalia
- Phylum: Arthropoda
- Class: Insecta
- Order: Hemiptera
- Suborder: Heteroptera
- Family: Belostomatidae
- Genus: Abedus
- Species: A. herberti

Binomial name
- Abedus herberti Hidalgo, 1935

= Abedus herberti =

Species of true bug

Abedus herberti, the toe biter (a name also used for several other giant water bugs) or ferocious water bug, is a species of giant water bug in the family Belostomatidae. It is native to streams, especially in highlands, in Arizona, New Mexico and Utah in the United States and in northwestern Mexico. Adults are typically 2 to 4 cm (0.8–1.6 in) long. The species is flightless, but may move overland between water sources. It will bite in self-defense, which is painful but not dangerous.

A. herberti is often displayed in zoos, sometimes together with the sunburst diving beetle. These two species also occur together in the wild.

== Behavior ==
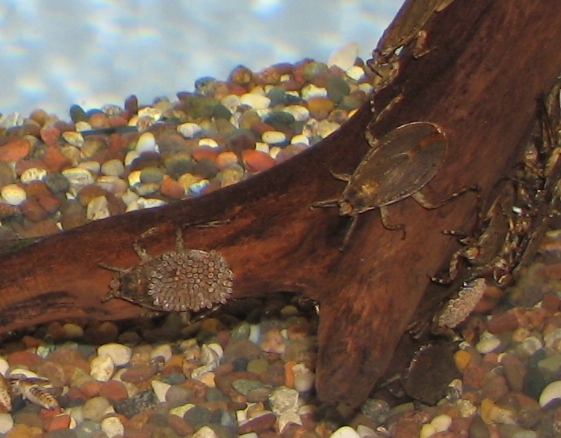
Several A. herberti, including both males with eggs on their back and individuals without eggs

As in its relatives, A. herberti has an unusual breeding behavior where the female attaches the eggs to the male's back and he takes care of them until they hatch into nymphs. Each egg can measure as much as 6 mm × 2 mm (0.24 in × 0.08 in) when fully developed, making them some of the largest insect eggs. After hatching from the eggs, the nymphs go through five instar stages before adulthood.

A. herberti is a sit-and-wait predator that catches small animals, especially invertebrates such as other aquatic insects and snails, but also small vertebrates such as young fish and tadpoles. Small and medium-sized prey items are caught with their strong front legs and stabbed with the proboscis, which injects a saliva that both incapacitates the prey and dissolves it. The largest food category (animals 1.2 cm [0.5 in] or more in length) are mostly scavenged. The only prey they regularly catch alive (not just scavenge) in the largest category is nymphs of their own species. Adults are generally highly cannibalistic towards their nymphs and older nymphs often eat younger; adults however only rarely cannibalize other adults.

== Subspecies ==
These two subspecies belong to the species Abedus herberti:

- Abedus herberti herberti Hidalgo, 1935
- Abedus herberti utahensis Menke, 1960
