= Parental care =

Behavior in animals of taking care of offspring

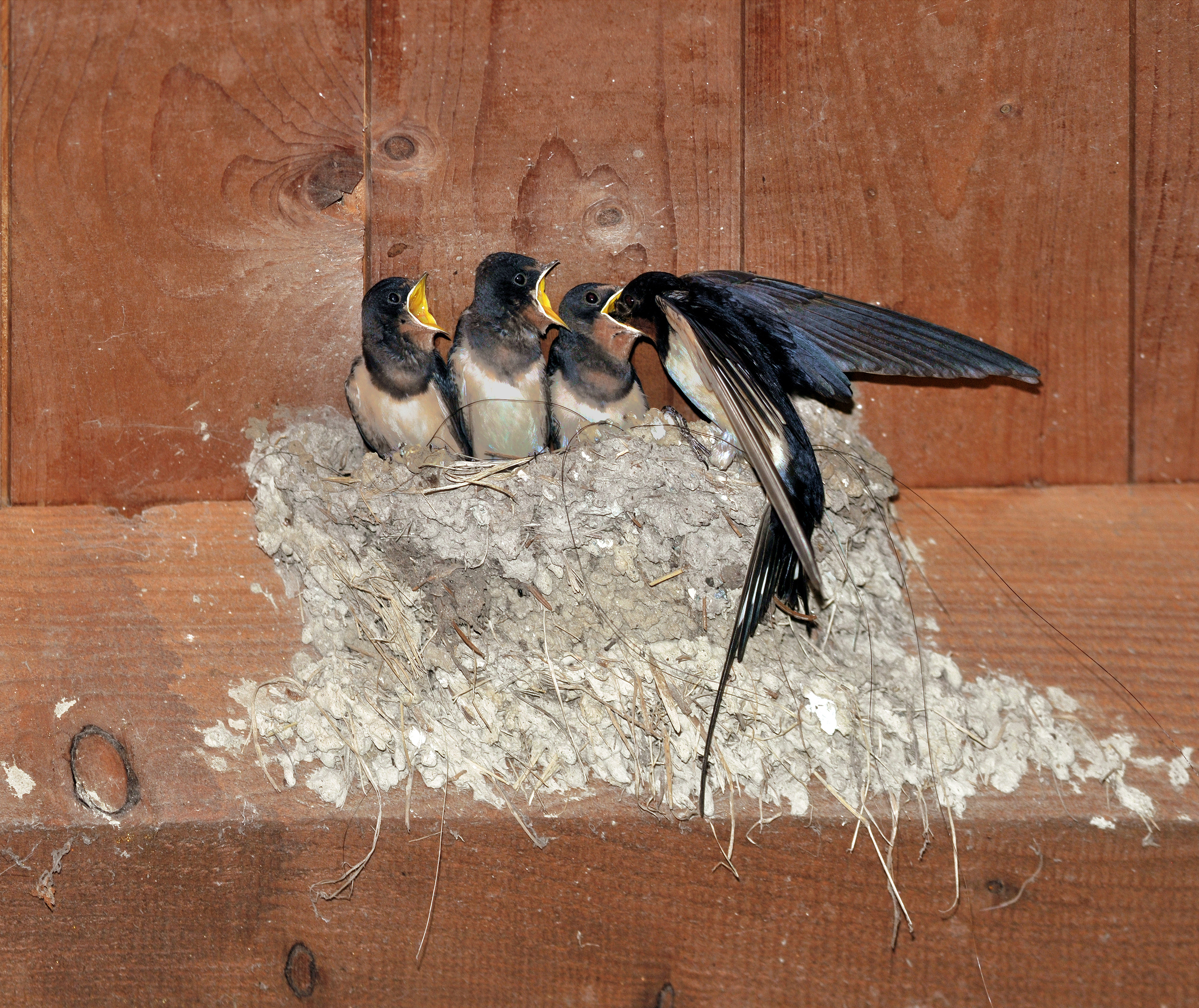
Swallow adult feeding begging young in the nest

Parental care is a behavioural and evolutionary strategy adopted by some animals, involving a parental investment being made to the evolutionary fitness of offspring. Patterns of parental care are widespread and highly diverse across the animal kingdom. There is great variation in different animal groups in terms of how parents care for offspring, and the amount of resources invested by parents. For example, there may be considerable variation in the amount of care invested by each sex, where females may invest more in some species, males invest more in others, or investment may be shared equally. Numerous hypotheses have been proposed to describe this variation and patterns in parental care that exist between the sexes, as well as among species.

Parental care is any behaviour that contributes to offspring survival, such as building a nest, provisioning offspring with food, or defending offspring from predators. Reptiles may produce self-sufficient young needing no parental care, while some hatchling birds may be helpless at birth, relying on their parents for survival. Parental care is beneficial if it increases the parent's inclusive fitness, such as by improving offspring survival, quality, or reproductive success. Since parental care is costly and often affects the parent's own future survival and reproductive success, parents ensure that any investment is well-spent. Parental care thus only evolves where it is adaptive.

Types of parental care include maternal or paternal care, biparental care and alloparental care. Sexual conflict is known to occur over mating, and further familial conflicts may continue after mating when there is parental care of the eggs or young. For example, conflict may arise between male and female parents over how much care each should provide, conflict may arise between siblings over how much care each should demand, and conflicts may arise between parents and offspring over the supply and demand of care.

Although parental care increases the evolutionary fitness of the offspring receiving the care, it produces a cost for the parent organism as energy is expended on caring for the offspring, and mating opportunities may be lost. As this is costly, it only evolves from a when the costs are outweighed by the benefits.

Parental care is seen in many insects, notably the social insects such as ants, bees and wasps; in certain fishes, such as the mouthbrooders; widely in birds; in amphibians; rarely in reptiles and especially widely in mammals, which share two major adaptations for care of the young, namely gestation (development of the embryo inside the mother's body) and production of milk.

== Types ==
=== Paternal care ===
Care of offspring by males may evolve when natural selection favouring parental care is stronger than sexual selection against paternal care. In approximately 1% of bird species, males exclusively provide care after eggs are laid. Male-only care is prevalent in a variety of organisms, including fish and amphibians. The occurrence of paternal care is mostly associated with biparental care in socially monogamous mating systems. The rise of paternal care in primates may be explained by the Mating Effort and Maternal Relief hypotheses. The Mating Effort hypothesis suggests that males may provide care for offspring in an attempt to increase their own mating opportunities and thus enhance their future reproductive success. The Maternal Relief hypothesis proposes that males provide care to reduce the burdens associated with reproduction for the female, which ultimately generates shorter inter-birth intervals and produces more successful offspring.

The type of mating system may influence paternity certainty, and therefore the likelihood that a male is caring for his own true offspring. Paternal certainty is relatively high in monogamous pair-bonded species. Males are less likely to be caring for unrelated offspring, therefore a greater prevalence of paternal care tends to exist in association with this mating system. By contrast, paternity certainty is reduced in polygamous species. Males are at greater risk of providing care for unrelated offspring, which therefore compromises their own fitness. In polygynous species, where a single male mates with more than one female, the male's role as a caregiver therefore tends to be reduced. Conversely, males may be exclusively responsible for caring for their offspring in polyandrous species, where a single female mates with more than one male.

The evolution of male parental care is particularly rare in non-monogamous species because predominantly, investing effort into mating is more evolutionarily effective for males than providing parental care. One hypothesis regarding the evolution of male parental care in non-monogamous species suggests that parental behaviour is correlated with increased siring of offspring. For instance, in mountain gorillas (Gorilla beringei), males of the upper tertile, regarding their frequency of interaction with young gorillas, regardless of the young's parentage, fathered five times more offspring than males of the lower-two affiliative tertiles. Further, male burying beetles (Nicrophorus vespilloides) attracted three times more females when given the opportunity to breed and provide parental care, compared to males that were not presented with a breeding opportunity. Species such as Gorilla beringei and Nicrophorus vespilloides indicate that selection may promote male parental care in non-monogamous species.

=== Maternal care ===
In mammalian species, female parents possess adaptations that may predispose them to care more for offspring. These adaptations include gestation and the production of milk. In invertebrates, maternal care is known to be a prerequisite for the evolution of permanent family grouping and eusociality. In spiders, permanent sociality is dependent on extended maternal care following hatching. Females of some species of reptiles may remain with their clutch to provide care, by curling around their eggs for the duration of the incubation period. The most intricate example of maternal care in this group can be seen in crocodilian species, as mothers may stay with their young for multiple months.

The general mammalian tendency for female parents to invest more in offspring was focused on in the development of early hypotheses to describe sex differences in paternal care. It was initially suggested that different levels of investment by each sex in terms of gamete size and number may have led to the evolution of female-only care. This early hypothesis suggested that because females invest more in the production of fewer and larger gametes, compared with males who produce many, smaller gametes, maternal care would be favoured. This is because females have initially invested more, and would thus stand more to lose if they did not continue to invest in the offspring.

=== Biparental care ===
Biparental care tends to be favoured when sexual selection is not intense, and when the adult sex ratio of males to females is not strongly skewed. For two parents to cooperate in caring for young, the mates must be coordinated with each other as well as with the requirements of the developing young, and the demands of the environment. The selection of biparental care as a behavioural strategy is considered to be an important factor driving the evolution of monogamy, if the value of exclusive cooperation in care for mutual offspring by two parents outweighs the potential benefits of polygamy for either sex. Biparental care may increase offspring survival as well as allow parents to gain further mating opportunities with the pair mate. There is conflicting evidence for whether offspring fare equally, better or worse when receiving care by two parents rather a single parent. On one hand, it has been suggested that due to sexual conflict, parents should withhold the amount of care they provide and shift as much of the workload as possible to their partner. In this case, offspring may be worse off. Other experimental evidence contrasts this, and suggests that when both parents care for their mutual offspring, their individual contributions may have synergistic effects on the fitness of their young. In this case, offspring would benefit from biparental care.

Biparental care is particularly prevalent in mammals and birds. 90% of bird species are monogamous, in which biparental care patterns are predominant. In birds, this parental care system is generally attributed to the ability of male birds to engage in most parental behaviours, with the exception of egg-laying. Due to their endothermy and small size at birth, there is a huge pressure for infant birds to grow up quickly to prevent energy loss. Since both sexes are able to forage and provision offspring, it is therefore beneficial for parents to cooperate in care to meet the requirements of infant birds. Offspring survival will ultimately increase the fitness of both parents. In insects, biparental care occurs only rarely. It was documented in several beetle families, e.g. burying beetles. Also is known in cockroaches, e.g. genus cryptocercus. In hymenoptera was documented in Trypoxylon wasps and bee Ceratina nigrolabiata.

=== Alloparental care ===
Alloparental care, caring for non-descendant offspring, is a seemingly altruistic and reproductively costly behaviour; it has both adaptive benefits and evident costs. It has been observed in over 120 mammal and 150 bird species. It is a defining feature of eusociality, which is found in insects, including various ants, bees, and termites.

For mammalian mothers, alloparenting may be beneficial in promoting earlier weaning of infants (as long as earlier weaning does not compromise infant survival). This strategy results in shorter inter-birth intervals and increased reproductive success. Frequent alloparenting may provide mothers more opportunities to feed without their young, which may ultimately increase their net energy gains and permits them to invest more energy in milk synthesis. However, potential costs of alloparenting may include the expenditure of time and resources in caring for non-descendant offspring with no apparent direct benefits to alloparents. The offspring that experience alloparental care may benefit from increased protection from predators and the learning of group dynamics through social interactions.

In the eusocial insects, the evolution of a caste system has driven workers to sacrifice their own personal reproductive fitness to assist in the reproductive success of the colony. Indirect fitness benefits are gained instead through assisting related members of the colony. It may be in the best interest of a worker to forgo her own personal reproduction and participate in alloparenting, or rearing drones, so that there is an enhanced likelihood that males from her colony will ultimately mate with a queen. This would provide a greater chance for her colony's genes to be represented in the future colony. Similarly, worker ants tend to raise their sisters rather than their daughters, due to their greater relatedness. The survival of the colony is believed to be the main reward that drives the altruism of the workers.

== Parental care in animals ==
=== Invertebrates ===
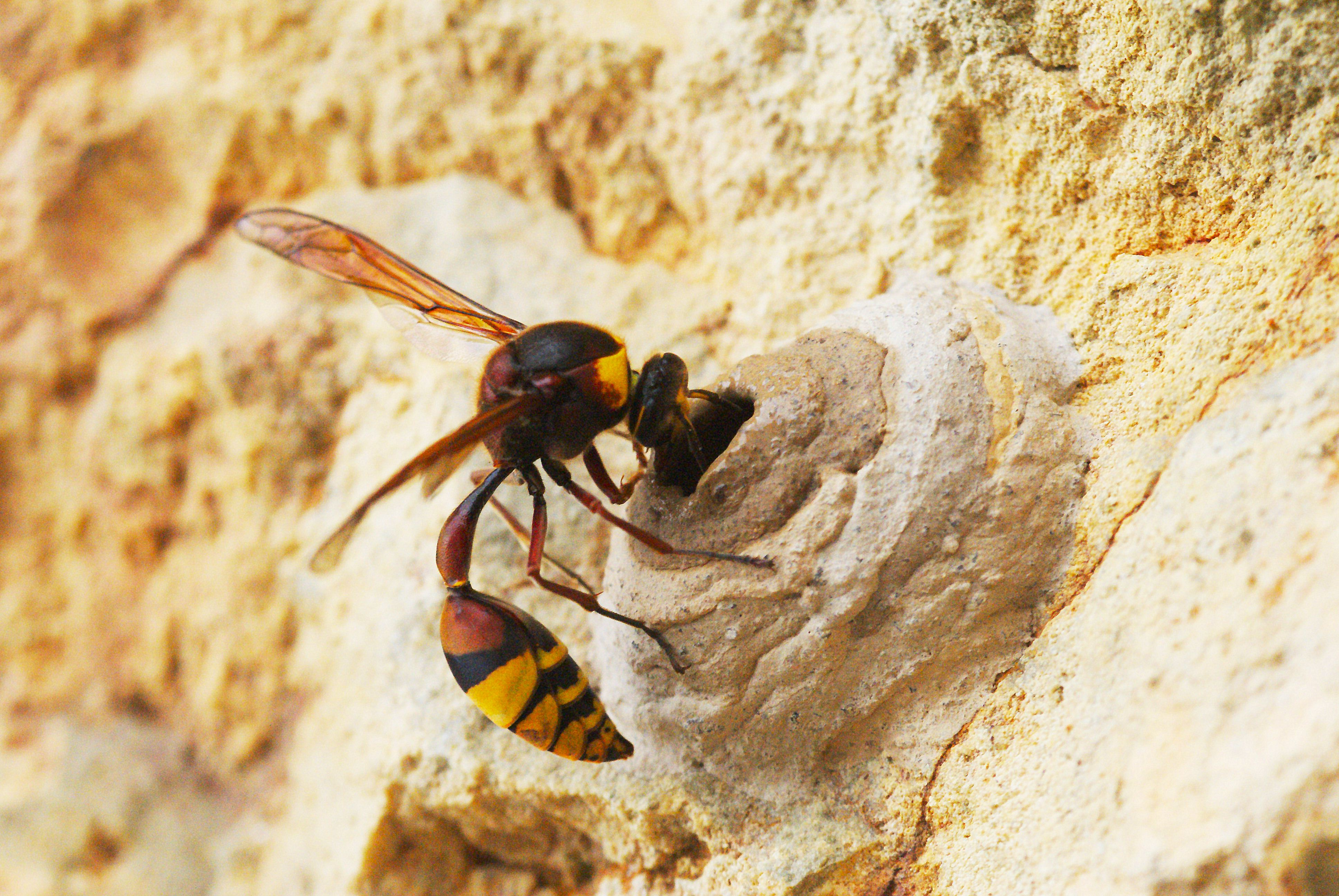
Potter wasp building mud nest for her offspring. Each nest is provisioned with food caught by the mother; one or more eggs are laid inside, and the nest is then sealed.

Parental care is not frequently observed in invertebrate species. In Dipterans, oviposition is instead commonly observed. Adults lay their eggs before leaving them to hatch and develop into larva, then pupa, then adults. For example, Phormia regina adults lay their eggs preferentially on carrion and corpses. Though biparental and male-only care are rarely observed, female-only care does exist in some invertebrates.

Some insects, including the Hymenoptera (ants, bees and wasps), invest substantial effort in caring for their young. The type and amount of care invested varies widely. Solitary wasps such as the potter wasps (Eumeninae) build nests for their young, provisioning them with food, often caterpillars, caught by the mother. The nests are then sealed, and the young live on the food until they leave the nest as adults. In contrast, social wasps and honeybees raise young in substantial colonies, with eggs laid mainly by queens (mothers), and the young cared for mainly by workers (sisters of the young).

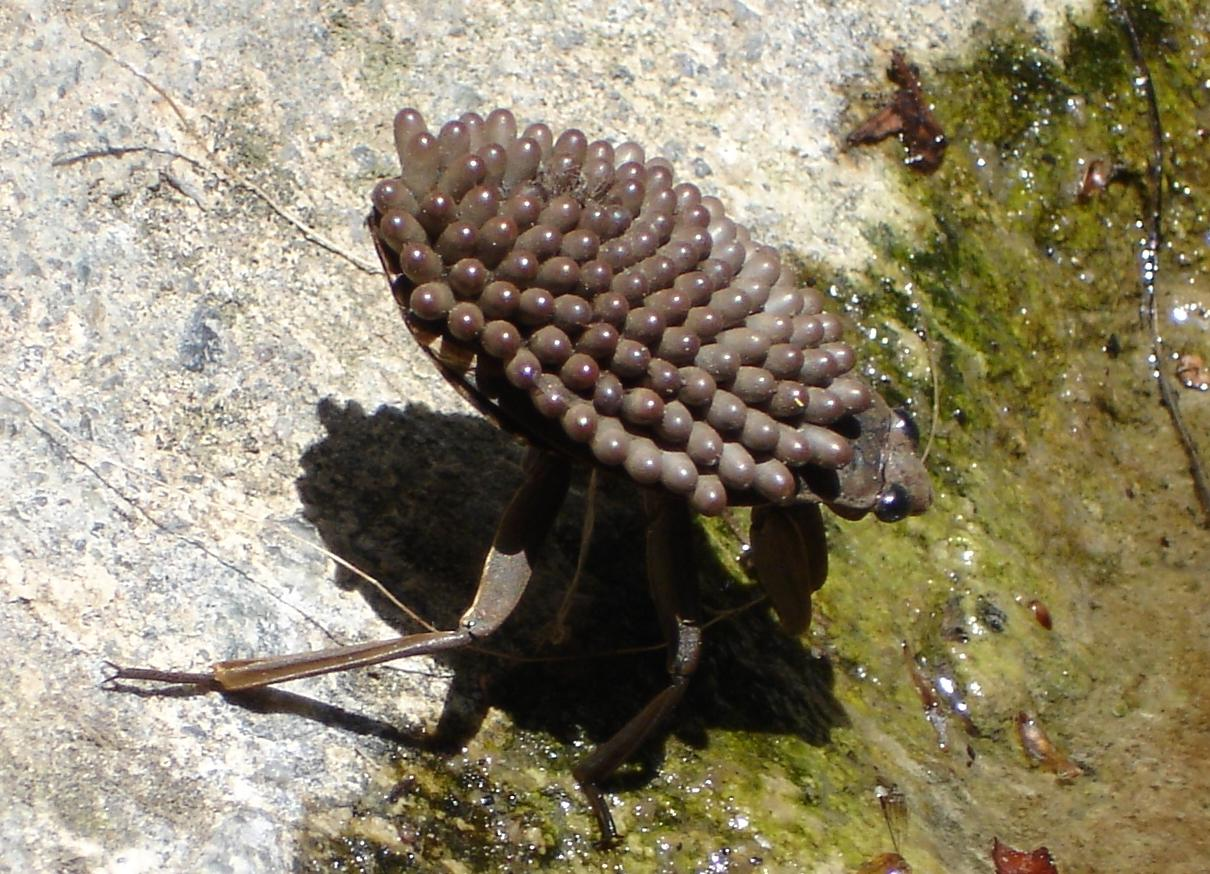
Male giant water bug Abedus indentatus with eggs on his back

Outside the Hymenoptera, parental care is found among the burying beetles and the magnificent salt beetle. Many species of Hemiptera take care of their young, for instance in the Belostomatidae genus Abedus.

Among arachnids, several groups exhibit parental care. Wolf spiders are known for carrying their young on their abdomens for several weeks after they hatch. Nursery web spiders and some jumping spiders guard their young in silk nests after they hatch. The jumping spider species Toxeus magnus is notable for nursing its young through a form of lactation.

Some crustaceans also show parental care. Mothers of the crab species Metopaulias depressus raises their young in water-filled bromeliads, cleaning them of debris, defending them against predators and feeding them with captured prey. In the desert isopod Hemilepistus reaumuri, juveniles share their parents' burrow for the first 10–20 days of their life, and are supplied with food by their parents. Finally, some species of Synalpheus shrimps are eusocial, living in colonies with one or a few breeders of each sex together with non-breeders that defend the colony.

=== Fish ===
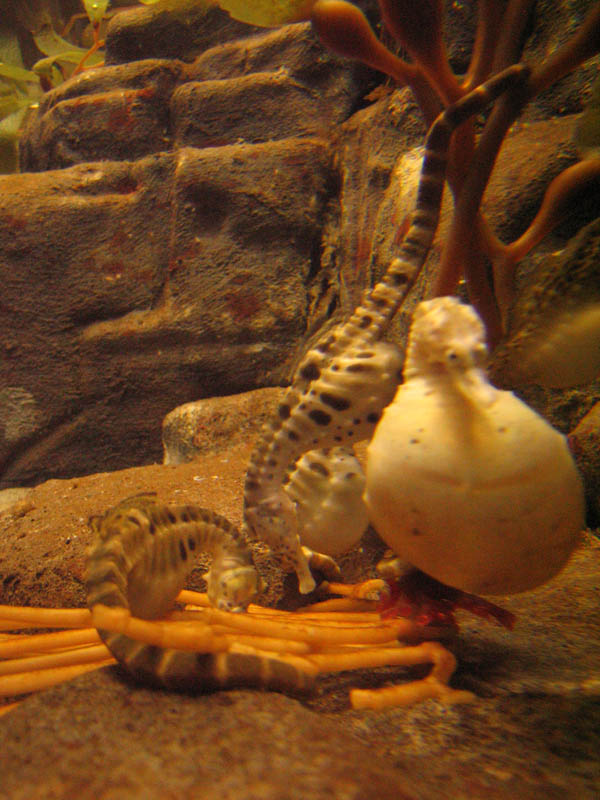
Pregnant male seahorse

Several groups of fish have evolved parental care. The ratio of fish genera that exhibit male-only: biparental: female-only care is 9:3:1. Some fish such as pipefish, sea dragons and seahorses (Syngnathidae) have a form of male pregnancy, where the female takes no part in caring for the young once she has laid her eggs. Males in other species may take a role in guarding the eggs before they hatch.

Mouthbrooding is the care given by some groups of fish (and a few other animals such as Darwin's frog) to their offspring by holding them in their mouth for extended periods of time. Mouthbrooding has evolved independently in several different families of fish including the cardinalfish, sea catfish, bagrid catfish, cichlids, snakeheads, jawfishes, gouramis, and arowanas.

=== Amphibians ===
There is an equal prevalence of female-only and male-only care in amphibians. However, biparental care is uncommon. Provisioning in this animal group tends to be rare, and offspring guarding is more prevalent. For example, in the frog species Bibron's Toadlet, male frogs are left to care for the nest. Parental care after the laying of eggs has been observed in 5% of caecilian species, 18% of salamander species and 6% of frog species, though this number is likely an underestimate due to taxonomic bias in research and the cryptic nature of many species. Six modes of parental care are recognized among the Amphibia, in different species: egg attendance, egg transport, tadpole attendance, tadpole transport, tadpole feeding, and internal gestation in the oviduct (viviparity and ovoviviparity). Many species also care for offspring (either eggs or tadpoles) in specially adapted structures of their body. For example, the male pouched frog of eastern Australia protects tadpoles in pouches on the lateral surface of their skin, the gastric-brooding frog raised tadpoles (and potentially eggs) in their stomach and the common Suriname toad raises eggs embedded in the skin on its back.

=== Reptiles ===
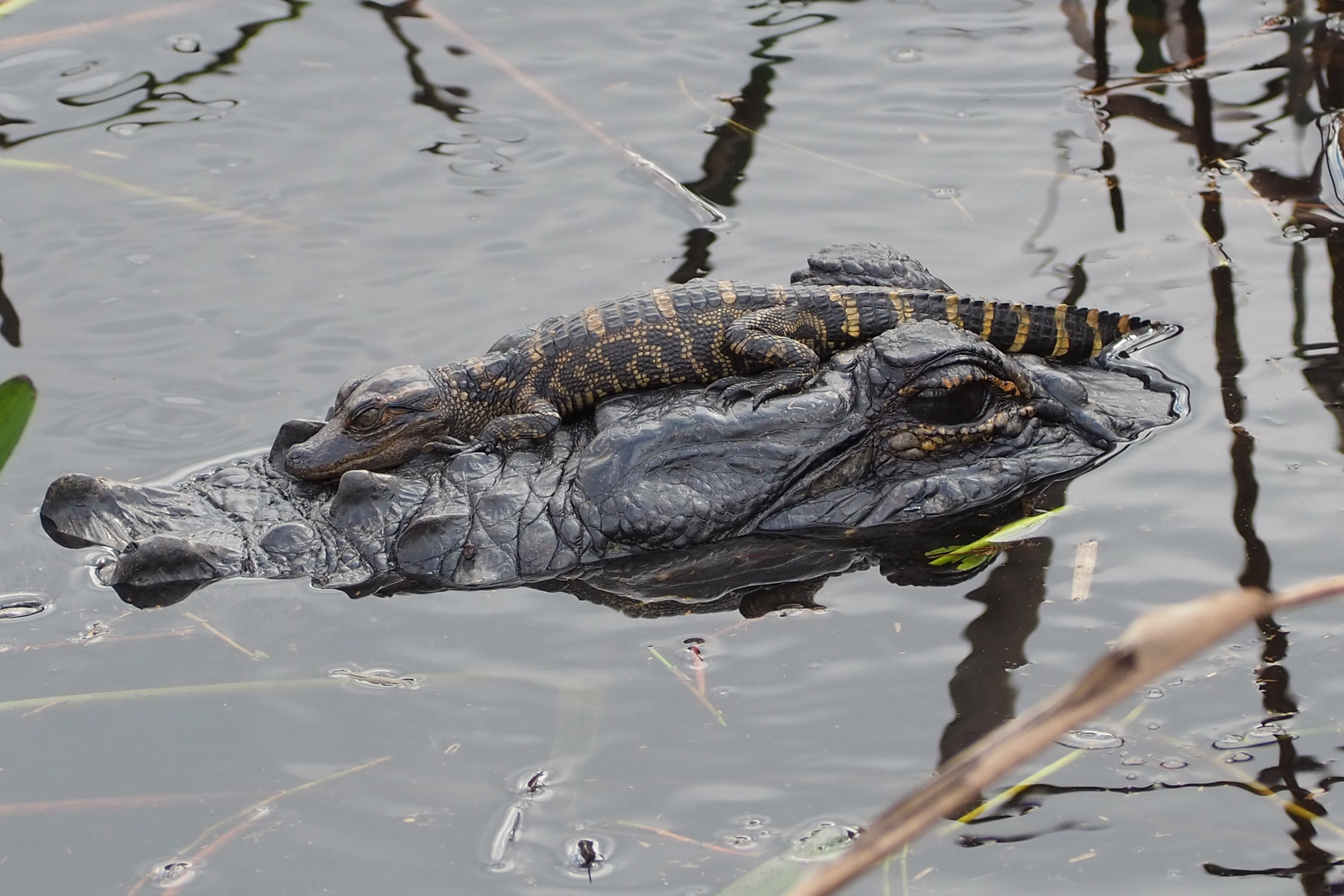
Unlike most reptiles, crocodilians care for their young even after they have hatched.

Reptiles provide less parental care than other tetrapods. When it does occur, it is usually female-only or biparental care. Many species within this group produce offspring that are self-sufficient, and are able to regulate their body temperatures and forage for themselves immediately after birth, thereby eliminating the need for parental care. Maternal care exists in crocodilians, where the mother assists hatchlings by transporting them in her mouth from the nest to the water. She may stay with the young for up to several months. Parental behavior have also been observed in Cunningham's skink, a viviparous lizard that protects its offspring against predators.

=== Birds ===
Birds are distinctive in the way they care for their young. 90% of bird species display biparental care, including 9% of species with alloparental care, or helpers at the nest. Biparental care may have originated in the stem reptiles (archosaurs) that gave rise to the birds, before they developed flight. In the remainder of bird species, female-only care is prevalent, and male-only care is rare. Most birds, including passerines (perching birds), have their young born blind, naked and helpless (altricial), totally dependent for their survival on parental care. The young are typically raised in a nest; the parents catch food and regurgitate it for the young. Some birds such as pigeons create a "crop milk" which they similarly regurgitate. David Lack developed a hypothesis that clutch size has evolved in response to the costs of parental care known as Lack's principle. It has since seen modifications but is still used as a general model.

=== Mammals ===
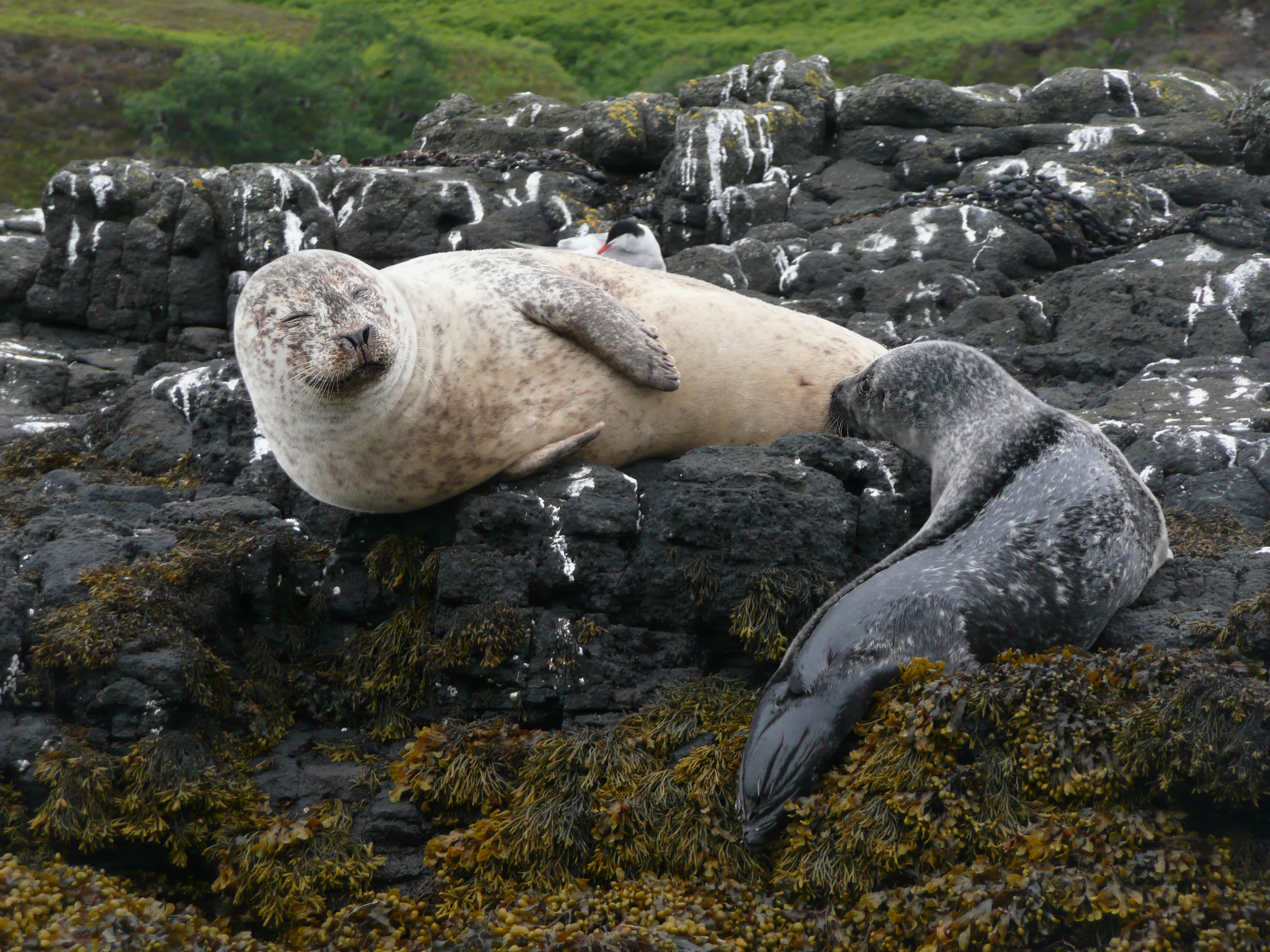
Harbour seal mother suckling its young

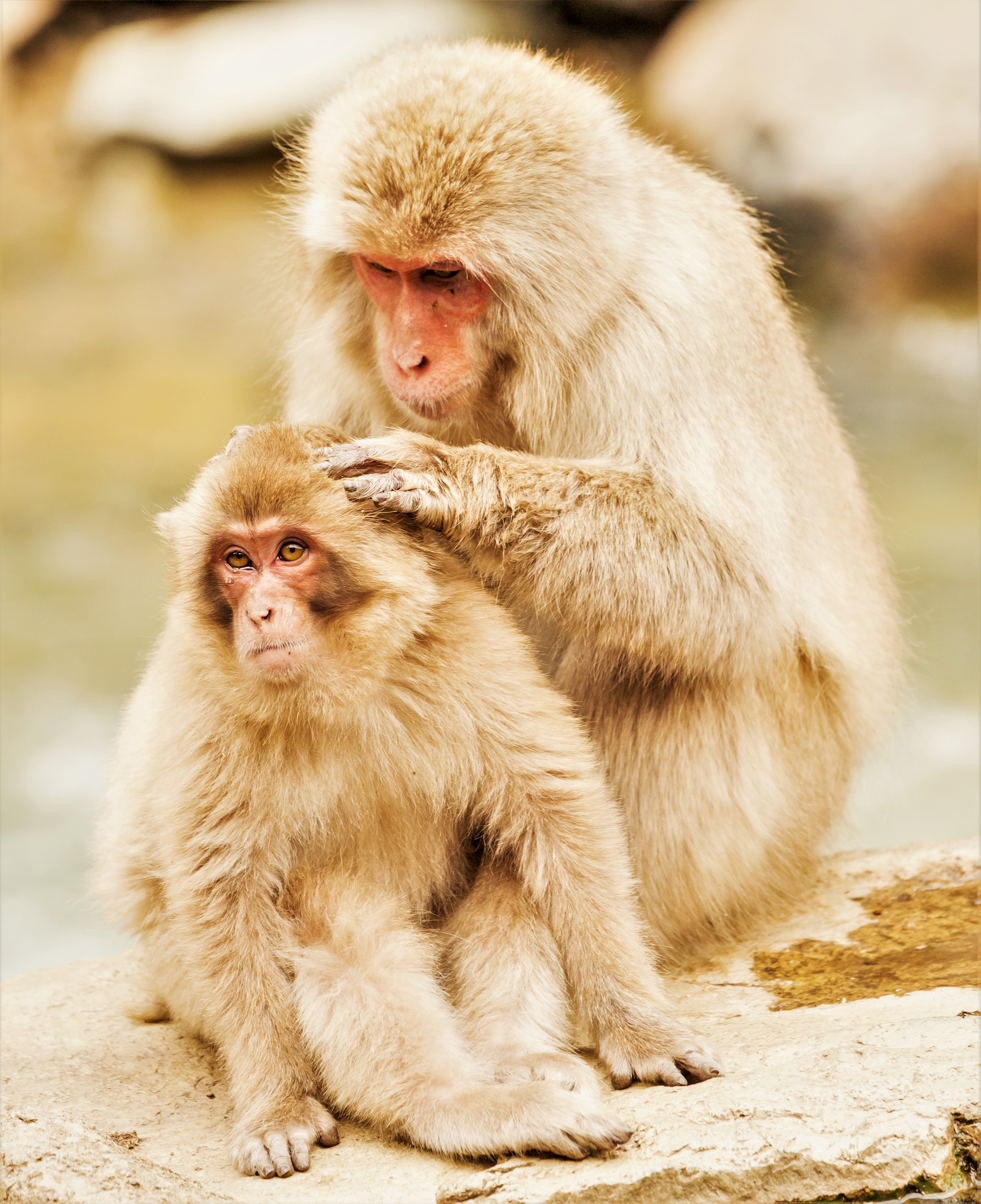
Japanese snow monkey mother grooming her young.

There is maternal care in all species of mammals, and while 95% of species exhibit female-only care, in only 5% biparental care is present. Thus, there are no known cases of male-only care in mammals. The major adaptation shared by all live-bearing mammals for care of their young after birth is lactation (the feeding of milk from the mammary glands). Further, many mammals exhibit other parental care behaviors to increase the fitness of their offspring, for example, building a den, feeding, guarding, carrying, huddling, grooming and teaching their young. Others, consider also as a type of care when males provision the pregnant females.

==== Humans ====
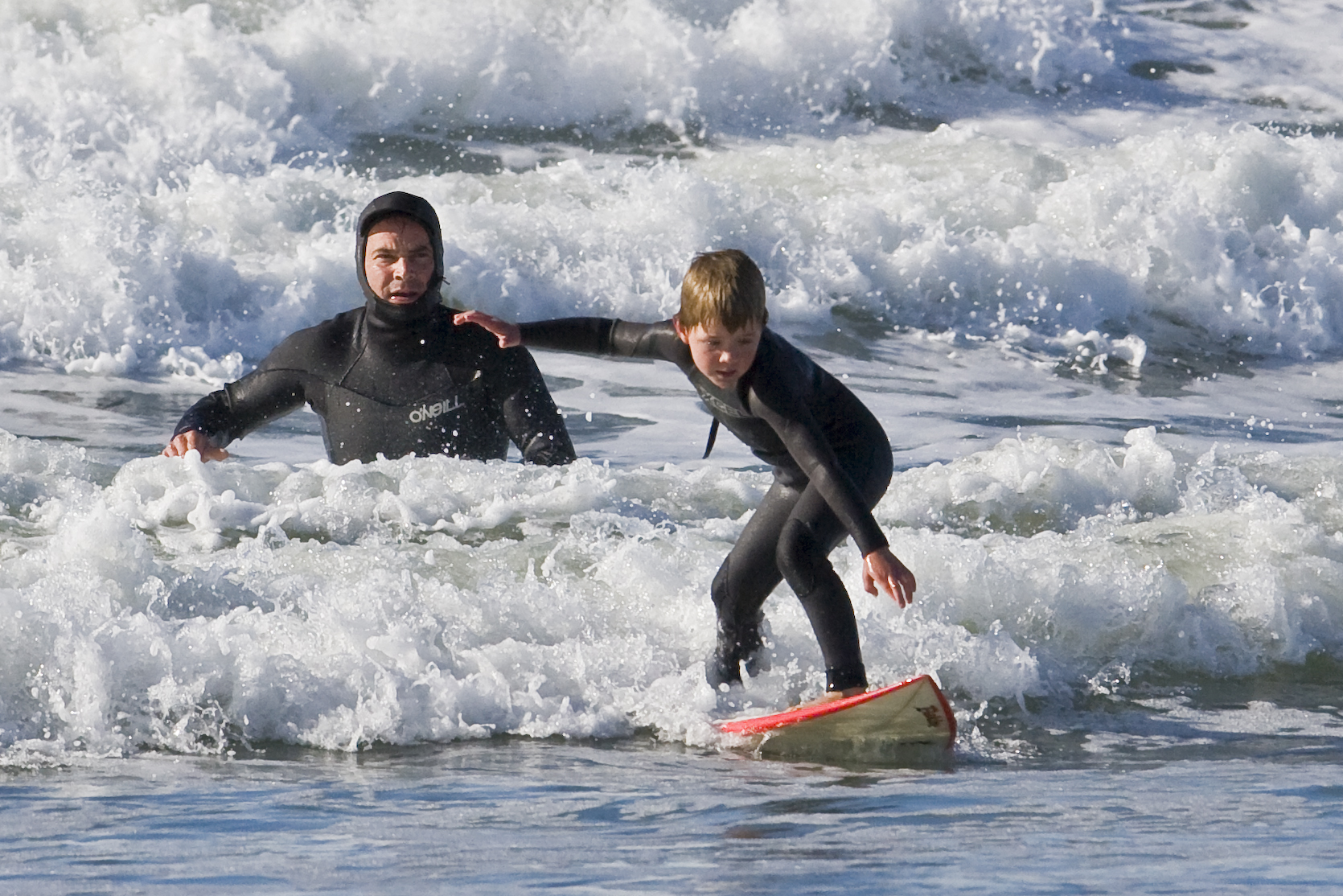
Human parental care extends far beyond providing food and protection. Here a father teaches his son how to surf.

Parenting or child rearing in humans is the process of promoting and supporting the physical, emotional, social, financial, and intellectual development of a child from infancy to adulthood. This goes far beyond anything found in other animals, including not only the provision of food, shelter, and protection from threats such as predators, but a prolonged period of support during which the child learns whatever is needed to live successfully in human society.

== Parental care in plants ==
Recently, parental care in plants has been discovered by Dr. Vineet Soni along with post doctoral fellow Dr. Upma Bhatt and Ph.D. candidate Yashwant Sompura. They provide experimental evidences of maternal care in plants. Their research established the existence of maternal care in the plant kingdom by demonstrating that mother plants provide prolonged physiological and resource support to their offspring during establishment and under environmental stress until they become fully independent.

== In evolutionary biology ==
In evolutionary biology, parental investment is the expenditure of time and effort towards rearing offspring that benefits the offspring's evolutionary fitness at a cost to parents' ability to invest in other components of the species' fitness. Parental care requires resources from one or both parents that increases the fitness of their offspring and of themselves. These resources thus cannot be invested in the parents own survival, growth or future reproduction. Therefore, parental care will only evolve in a species that requires care. Some animal groups produce self-sufficient young and thus no parental care is required.

For species that do require care, trade-offs exist in regards to where parental investment should be directed and how much care should be provided, since resources and time are limited. For example, if the strategy of parental care involves parents choosing to give each of a relatively small number of offspring an increased chance of surviving to reproduce themselves, they may accordingly have evolved to produce a small number of zygotes at a time, possibly only one. The ideal amount of parental investment would guarantee the survival and quality of both broods. Parents need to trade off investment into current and future reproductive events, since parental care increases offspring survival at the expense of the parent's ability to invest in future broods. Nonetheless, there is some evidence suggesting that in mammals provinding male care actually leads to more fecund females, and thus caring for the offspring can lead to having more number of litters.

Predation on offspring and species habitat-type are two potential proximate causes for the evolution of parental care. Generally, parental care is expected to evolve from a previous state of no care when the costs of providing care are outweighed by the benefits to a caring parent. For example, if the benefit of increased offspring survival or quality exceed the decreased chance of survival and future reproductive success of the parent, then parental care may evolve. Therefore, parental care is favoured when it is required by offspring, and the benefits of care are high.

Types of parental care and the amount of resources invested by parents vary considerably across the animal kingdom. The evolution of male-only, female-only, biparental or alloparental care in different groups of animals may be driven by multiple factors. Firstly, different groups may have diverse physiological or evolutionary constraints that may predispose one sex to care more than the other. For example, mammary glands may make female mammals preadapted to exclusively provide nutritional care to young. Secondly, the costs and benefits of care by each sex may be influenced by ecological conditions and mating opportunities. Thirdly, operational and adult sex ratios may influence which sex has more mating opportunities, and thus predisposes one sex to care more. Furthermore, parenting decisions may be influenced by the confidence of either sex in being the genetic parent of the offspring, or paternity certainty.

=== Which sex provides care ===
The type of mating system may influence which sex provides care. In monogamous species that establish long-term pair-bonds, parents are likely to cooperate in caring for their offspring. In polyandrous mating systems, paternal or male-only care tends to evolve. Conversely, polygynous mating systems are associated with little or no male contribution. Males rarely provide care for offspring in promiscuous mating systems, since there is high paternity uncertainty.

Male care is most prevalent in species with external fertilisation, while female care is more common with internal fertilisation. Explanations include the suggestion by Trivers (1972) that this depends on paternity certainty, which may be less with internal fertilisation unless the male undertakes "mate guarding" until the female lays eggs or gives birth.

A second explanation is Richard Dawkins and T. R. Carlisle's (1976) theory that the order of gamete release, and therefore the opportunity for each parent to desert, may influence which sex provides care. Internal fertilisation may provide the male parent with an opportunity to desert first, as is seen in some bird and mammal species; the roles may be reversed with external fertilisation. In fish, males often wait until a female lays her eggs before he can fertilise them, to prevent his small gametes from floating away. This allows the female to desert first, and leave male parents to care for the eggs.

Thirdly, George C. Williams's (1975) hypothesis indicates that an association with the embryos may predispose one sex to care for the offspring. With internal fertilisation occurring in the mother, the female parent is most closely associated with the embryo, and may be preadapted to care for the young. With external fertilisation, eggs are often laid by the female in a male's territory. Male territoriality is particularly common with external fertilisation. Therefore, the male is most closely associated with the embryos. Males may defend their territories and thereby incidentally defend their eggs and young. This may preadapt males to provide care. Male care consequently involves less opportunity costs in this case, since males can still attract mates while simultaneously guarding territory and eggs. Females may even be more attracted to, and preferentially select to mate with, males that already have eggs in their nest.

Male territoriality with internal fertilisation exists in some bird species. Nest size and nest building behaviour are two sexually selected traits that may attract a female to a male's territory for mating. Since the female lays her eggs in the nest within the male's territory, paternal care may evolve, even though fertilisation is internal.

=== Amount of care ===
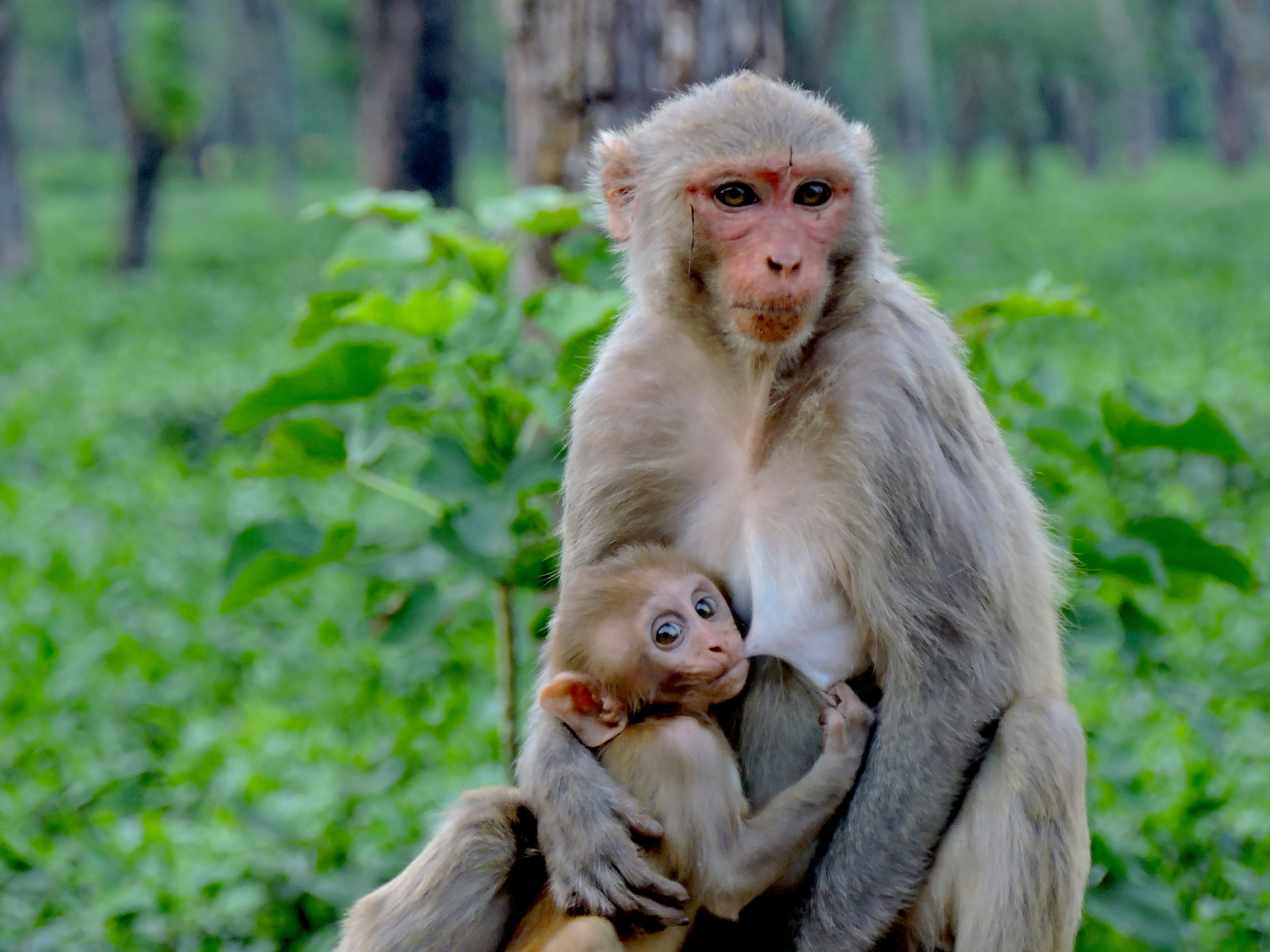
Mother and child in the woods

Increasing parental investment in any one young benefits that particular offspring, but decreases resources for other offspring, possibly decreasing parental fitness. Hence, a trade-off exists between offspring quantity and quality within a brood. If a parent disperses its limited resources thinly among too many offspring, then few will survive. Alternatively, if the parent uses its resources too generously among one small brood, this reduces the ability of the parent to invest in future broods. Therefore, there is a theoretical optimal brood size that maximises productivity for each brood.

In groups with biparental care, there is sexual conflict over how much care should be provided. If either parent is temporarily removed, the other parent may increase its work rate. This demonstrates that both parents have the capacity to work harder and provide greater levels of care. One parent may be tempted to cheat, relying on the other parent. In biparental care, the key theoretical prediction is that parents should respond to reduced partner effort with incomplete compensation. A parent who does not put in their fair share of work then suffers reduced fitness, because their offspring receive less resources from both parents. This has been experimentally demonstrated with birds.

== Flexibility of parental care ==
=== Parental care may vary in relation to costs and benefits ===
When one parent is not sufficient, both parents may need to care for offspring. Each parent would like to minimise the level of care they must invest at the expense of the other parent. If one parent were to die or cease providing care, then the remaining partner may be obliged to desert the eggs or young.

The extent of parental care provided to a current brood may also be influenced by prospects of future reproduction. Field experiments on a passerine bird species indicated that in areas where broods were fed with extra carotenoids, their mouths became redder. This consequently enhanced their begging displays and led parents to increase their provisioning. This was likely because the redder mouths indicated that offspring were healthier, and thus worth investing in. In other territories, the adults were also provided carotenoid-rich sugar diets, which increased the likelihood of them having a second brood in that season. Since parents that had second broods did not respond to the increased begging signals of their current brood, this indicates that parents strategically vary their sensitivity to their current broods demands in relation to their future prospects of reproducing in that season.

The act of eating one's own offspring, or filial cannibalism, may be an adaptive behaviour for a parent to use as an extra source of food. Parents may eat part of a brood to enhance the parental care of the current brood. Alternatively, parents may eat the whole brood to cut their losses and improve their future reproductive success.

=== Parental care may vary in relation to mate attractiveness ===
In theory, a parent should invest more when paired with a mate of a high phenotypic or genetic quality. This is explained by the differential allocation hypothesis. This was shown through experimentation on zebra finches. Males were made more attractive to females by experimentally giving them red leg bands. Females increased their provisioning and raised more young when paired with these attractive males compared to when they were paired with less attractive males that had blue or green leg bands. Further experimentation on mallard ducks has displayed that females lay larger eggs and increase their provisioning when paired with more attractive males. Female peacocks have also been shown to lay more eggs after mating with males that possess more elaborate tails. Furthermore, female birds are generally more likely to care for the offspring of males that spend more time nest building, and build more elaborate nests. As a consequence, the reproductive success of males tends to increase with nest size and building behaviour.

Therefore, differential allocation is expected because the offspring of these pairings would likely inherit the quality of the attractive parent, if attractiveness signifies genetic quality. Differential allocation may also work the other way around, where parents may invest less in their offspring if paired with unattractive mates. By reducing the amount of care invested in these offspring, individuals may save resources for future reproductive attempts with a more attractive mate.

Differential allocation is mostly expected from females, since in many animal groups females are more choosy when assessing potential mates. However, in many bird species, males are known to be involved in caring for young, which may lead to differential allocation by males as well as females.

== See also ==
- Maternal bond
- Parental love
- Paternal bond
