= Ralph Schoenstein =

Ralph Schoenstein (May 29,1933 – August 24, 2006) was an American writer and humorist. He was a frequent commentator to NPR's All Things Considered.

== Early life and education ==
Ralph Samuel Schoenstein was born in Manhattan and graduated from Columbia University in 1953. He was the son of Paul Schoenstein, Pulitzer Prize-winning city editor of the New York Journal-American.

== Career ==
He began writing after a brief stint in the Army, and became the author of over 18 novels and non-fiction works. His 1960 memoir, The Block, tells of his growing up on New York's Upper West Side. 1978's Citizen Paul is a remembrance of his father. Schoenstein was also the ghostwriter of a number of books for celebrities like Joan Rivers, Ed McMahon, and Bill Cosby (Fatherhood and Time Flies).

He was a frequent contributor to The New Yorker, The New York Times, New York Daily News, Newsday, and Playboy. In addition to All Things Considered, Schoenstein also provided humorous commentaries for the ABC Evening News and the Today Show. He also wrote several articles for the early issues of the National Lampoon. Schoenstein became friends with the Lampoon editorial staff, who named the Animal House character Donald "Boon" Schoenstein after him.

He also ghost wrote Bill Cosby's 1987 best seller, "Fatherhood."

== Personal life and death ==
Schoenstein, who resided in Princeton, New Jersey, died on August 24, 2006, in Philadelphia, Pennsylvania, from complications following heart surgery.

== Selected bibliography ==
- The Block (1960)
- With T-Shirts and Beer Mugs For All (1968)
- Citizen Paul: The Story of Father and Son (republished as Superman and Son) (1978)
