= Mark Solms =

South African psychoanalyst and neuropsychologist

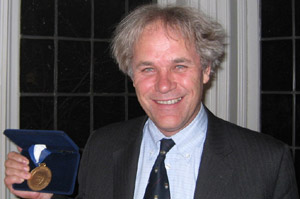
- Mark Solms has received the Arnold Pfeffer Prize
- Born: 17 July 1961 (age 65); Lüderitz, South West Africa (present-day Namibia)
- Education: Pretoria Boys’ High School
- Alma mater: University of the Witwatersrand
- Scientific career
- Fields: Psychoanalysis; Neuropsychology
- Workplaces: University of Cape Town
- Thesis: Anoneira And The Neuropsychology Of Dreams. (1991)
- Website: humanities.uct.ac.za/department-psychology/contacts/mark-solms

Mark Solms (born 17 July 1961) is a South African psychoanalyst and neuropsychologist, who is known for his discovery of the brain mechanisms of dreaming and his use of psychoanalytic methods in contemporary neuroscience. He holds the chair of neuropsychology at the University of Cape Town and Groote Schuur Hospital (Departments of Psychology and Neurology) and is the president of the South African Psychoanalytical Association. He is also research chair of the International Psychoanalytical Association (since 2013).

Solms founded the International Neuropsychoanalysis Society in 2000 and he was a founding editor (with Ed Nersessian) of the journal Neuropsychoanalysis. He is director of the Arnold Pfeffer Center for Neuropsychoanalysis at the New York Psychoanalytic Institute. He is also director of the Neuropsychoanalysis Foundation in New York, a trustee of the Neuropsychoanalysis Fund in London, and director of the Neuropsychoanalysis Trust in Cape Town. He is a trustee of the Loudoun Trust.

== Background and education ==
Mark Leonard de Gier Solms was born on 17 July 1961 in Lüderitz in present-day Namibia. His ancestor Johann Adam Solms (1792–1854) was born in the winegrowing town of Nackenheim in the Electorate of Mainz, and moved to the Cape Colony from the then-Grand Duchy of Hesse in 1838.

Mark Solms was educated at Pretoria Boys High School in South Africa. He then attended the University of the Witwatersrand, where he graduated with a bachelor's degree in Psychology (1984), an Honours degree in Applied Psychology (1985), a master's degree in Research Psychology (1987) and a PhD in Neuropsychology (1992). He emigrated to London in 1988, where he worked academically at University College London (Psychology Department) and clinically at the Royal London Hospital (Neurosurgery Department), while he trained at the Institute of Psychoanalysis (1989-1994). During this period, he established the first neuropsychoanalytic clinical service at the Anna Freud Centre.

== Contribution to neuropsychoanalysis ==
Mark Solms is best known for his discovery of the forebrain mechanisms of dreaming, and for his integration of psychoanalytic theories and methods with those of modern neuroscience. Solms demonstrated that dreaming can occur without REM sleep.

He is reportedly the first person to have used the term neuropsychoanalysis.

Solms' work tries to connect the theories and findings of psychoanalysis, a science of the mind (subjective thoughts, feelings, memories, etc.), with modern neuroscientific knowledge of the objective anatomical structure and functions of the brain. The renowned case of Phineas Gage, who had traumatic brain injury caused by a tamping iron, is traditionally used to illustrate these connections. Gage was physically recovered but his mind was radically changed and his friends and acquaintances said that he was 'no longer Gage'. According to Solms, these clinical observations demonstrate that the brain and the personality are inextricable. They make it clear that the object of study in psychoanalysis is somehow intrinsically connected with the object of study of neuroscience. Solms is convinced that the only way to fully understand the brain is by bringing back together psychoanalysis and neuroscience.

The pivotal aim of Solms' work is to provide an empirical method by which psychoanalysis can rejoin neuroscience in a way that is compatible with Freud's basic assumptions. In order to accomplish that, Solms relies on one of the major developments within neuroscience since Freud's death: the work of Alexander Romanovich Luria. Luria's method identifies the neurological organization of any mental function without contradicting the fundamental assumptions of psychoanalysis. Hence, a viable bridge is established between the concepts of psychology, those of anatomy, physiology and all the other branches of neurological science. Solms elaborates and formulates a new approach to investigate the deeper strata of the mind by implementing neuropsychoanalysis thinking: "I am recommending that we chart the neurological organization of the deepest strata of the mind, using a psychoanalytic version of syndrome analysis, by studying the deep structure of the mental changes that can be discerned in neurological patients within a psychoanalytic relationship."

Though Solms' work draws heavily upon the work of Sigmund Freud, he also has criticisms of some of Freud's theories. For example, he disagrees with Freud's theory of the death drive and has described his views on sex as "seriously muddled."

He has also contributed substantially to the science of consciousness.

In addition to research, Solms uses psychoanalysis to treat patients with psychatric and neurological disorders.

== Recognition ==
Mark Solms has received numerous awards, notably Honorary Membership of the New York Psychoanalytic Society in 1998, the American College of Psychoanalysts in 2004 and the American College of Psychiatrists in 2015. Other awards include:

- Harry Oppenheimer Fellowship Award by the Oppenheimer Memorial Trust (2017)
- Sigmund Freud Award by the American Society of Psychoanalytic Physicians (2013)
- Eli W. Lane Memorial Award by the Southwest Psychoanalytic Society, University of Arizona [awarded twice] (2012 & 2013)
- Sigourney Award by the Mary Sigourney Trust (2011)
- Oscar Sternbach Award for Outstanding Dedication and Contributions to Psychoanalysis (2009)
- Arnold Pfeffer Prize by the New York Psychoanalytic Institute (2008)
- Hans W. Loewald Memorial Award by the International Forum for Psychoanalytic Education (2007)
- Gradiva Award for Best Book (Science Category): 'Clinical Studies in Psychoanalysis' [with K. Kaplan-Solms] by the National Association for the Advancement of Psychoanalysis (2001)
- International Psychiatrist Lecture by the American Psychiatric Association (2001)
- George Sarton Medal by the Rijksuniversiteit Gent, Belgium (1996).

== Publications ==
Solms has published widely in both neuroscientific and psychoanalytic journals, including Cortex (journal), Neuropsychologia, Trends in Cognitive Sciences and Behavioral and Brain Sciences. He is also frequently published in general-interest journals, such as Scientific American. He has published more than 250 articles and book chapters, and 6 books. His second book, The Neuropsychology of Dreams (1997), was a landmark contribution to the field. His 2002 book (with Oliver Turnbull), The Brain and the Inner World was a best-seller and has been translated into 13 languages. His 2021 book, on the hard problem of consciousness, is entitled The Hidden Spring: A Journey to the Source of Consciousness (2021). He is the authorised editor and translator of the Revised Standard Edition of the Complete Psychological Works of Sigmund Freud (24 vols), published in 2024, and of the forthcoming Complete Neuroscientific Works of Sigmund Freud (4 vols). His latest book, The Only Cure: Freud and the Neuroscience of Mental Healing (2026), aims to rehabilitate the images of psychoanalysis and Freud for a popular audience.

He is the lead educator of an online course entitled "What is a Mind?".

== Winemaking ==
Outside academia, Solms is involved in winemaking. Solms-Delta is a farm located in the Franschhoek Valley, with a rich history and prize-winning wines. Solms took over custodianship of the farm in 2001. Its 325-year history was deeply rooted in slavery, but Solms decided to transform the farm into a cooperative. Now, all 180 inhabitants of the land and previously workers for the farm, along with Solms and British philanthropist Richard Astor, are co-owners. Solms affirms that worker subjectivity is important for the quality of the final product: "Wine is made by hand, and the attitude of the labourers affects what is in the bottle, from the way they tend the vines and select the grapes. If someone is preparing it with resentment and hatred, what will he make?"

== Personal life ==
When Solms was a young child, his older brother was injured and suffered brain damage. Afterwards, Solms experienced severe death anxiety. To treat it, he underwent psychoanalysis by Clifford Yorke.

In 1985, Solms married Karen Kaplan-Solms, who is also a psychoanalyst and neuropsychologist. Together they wrote the book Clinical Studies in Neuropsychoanalysis in 2001, which received the Gradiva Award for Best Book (Science Category) by the National Association for the Advancement of Psychoanalysis, USA. They have a son (Leonard, born in 1996) and a daughter (Ella, born in 2000). His current partner is Eliza Kentridge, the artist and poet, who lives in Wivenhoe, England.
