= Maternity (disambiguation) =

Maternity is being a mother.

Maternity also may refer to:

- Maternity (film), a 1917 American silent film
- "Maternity" (House), a television episode
- Maternity (play), a 1915 English-language production of a 1904 play by Eugène Brieux

== See also ==
- Motherhood (disambiguation)
- "Manternity" (Black-ish), a television episode
- Parental leave, an employee benefit
