= Fatherhood (TV series) =

- Created by: Bill Cosby; Charles Kipps
- Based on: Fatherhood by Bill Cosby
- Directed by: Jamie Mitchell; Michael Lembeck
- Voices of: Blair Underwood; Sabrina Le Beauf; Giovonnie Samuels; Marc John Jefferies; Jamai Fisher
- Country of origin: United States
- Original language: English
- No. of seasons: 2
- No. of episodes: 26

Production
- Producers: Bill Cosby; Charles Kipps; Marc Seal; Jeff Kahn; Bob Sand
- Running time: approx. 30 minutes (per episode)
- Production companies: Smiley, Inc.; Nickelodeon Animation Studio (uncredited)

Original release
- Network: Nick at Nite
- Release: June 20, 2004 – November 27, 2005

Fatherhood is an American animated sitcom about the Bindlebeep family, inspired by the book of the same name by Bill Cosby, which aired from 2004 to 2005. This was Nick at Nite's first original animated series. It has aired on Nick at Nite and Nickelodeon. It also aired on YTV in Canada. This is Cosby's final show he created before his sexual assault cases in 2014.

An overpowering, educated African-American scientist Dr. Arthur Bindlebeep is the head of the family and a high school teacher. He and his wife, Norma, try to be model parents while learning a few things from their three children: Angie, Roy and Katherine and their dog Guinness. At the same time, Arthur's own parents, Lester and Louise, still have some lessons for him.

== Production ==
Blair Underwood, who played Dr. Bindlebeep, said that he had meetings with Cosby to help find the voice of the character: "When you're a father, you have to constantly be straddling that line between being a disciplinarian and loving your kid. Sometimes we err on the side of being too friendly with our kids, and sometimes we can be too stern. And what [Cosby] was saying as a through line was, 'Make sure that whatever you're doing, whatever you're saying is coming from a place of love and that will inform the tone of the voice.'"

== Voice cast ==
- Blair Underwood as Dr. Arthur Bindlebeep
- Sabrina Le Beauf as Norma Bindlebeep
- Giovonnie Samuels as Angie Bindlebeep
- Marc John Jefferies as Roy Bindlebeep
- Jamai Fisher as Katherine Bindlebeep

== Episodes ==
=== Series overview ===
Season	Episodes	Originally released	
Season	Episodes	First released	Last released
1	13	June 20, 2004	February 6, 2005
2	13	May 17, 2005	November 27, 2005

=== Season 1 (2004–05) ===
No.	Title	Original release date	Prod. code
1	"It's a Dad, Dad World"	June 20, 2004	101
Dr. Bindlebeep's parents, Lester and Louise, receive a visit from Arthur, Norma, and the kids. He exercises regularly to stay like this. They play touch football, and Lester is injured. Arthur was acting like the son, but roles have switched when his father begins taking over the role of son from his injury. Series Premiere
2	"Take My Daughter...Please"	June 22, 2004	102
Dr. Bindlebeep and Norma are awakened in the middle of the night by a bear in their garage. As animal control officers set about removing the bear, they realize their car is gone.
3	"Privacy?"	June 29, 2004	103
Dr. Bindlebeep looks forward to a Saturday alone and some golden "privacy." However, all plans are disrupted when the Wrangler comes by to catch a pesky rodent.
4	"The Lyin' King"	July 6, 2004	104
Dr. Bindlebeep prepares to give a speech about truth in the media that evening and uses his family at the breakfast table. Of course, driven by his desire to see a PG-13 movie, Roy tells a series of lies that sink him deeper and deeper into deception.
5	"Won't You Be My Neighbor?"	July 13, 2004	105
Dr. Bindlebeep gives great fatherly advice about not judging others and giving them a chance. However, when a new neighbor moves next door, he just can't seem to hear his own guidance. Dr. Bindlebeep spies on the prospective neighbors and offers general information about the neighborhood.
6	"It's Your Birthday"	July 20, 2004	106
It's Dr. Bindlebeep's birthday and just to make sure he gets something nice, he slips each of the kids a little extra money for his gift. James, the most popular guy in high school, strolls into the store and says he'll take Angie to a concert that night if she buys the tickets.
7	"Alarming Situation"	September 21, 2004	107
Arthur Bindlebeep has a new alarm system for his home security, but it keeps going off. The phone, alarm company, and an electrician can't find anything wrong with it.
8	"Balancing the Books"	September 28, 2004	108
Norma's boss is selling the book store where she works, so she decides that she wants to buy the book store herself. She has 12 hours to raise enough money to buy the book store. Her entire family donates their money to help pay for the book store.
9	"Dog Day Afternoon"	October 5, 2004	109
When Norma has an all day meeting, she asks Dr. Bindlebeep to take over her responsibilities. These responsibilities include feeding the kids breakfast and taking Guinness, the family dog, for a lunchtime walk. Unfortunately for Dr. Bindlebeep, Guinness takes off and disappears.
10	"Am I Still Grounded?"	October 12, 2004	110
Angie isn't doing well in school, so Dr. Bindlebeep hires a tutor. When Angie doesn't go to the tutor, Angie is grounded. Later, Angie gives Dr. Bindlebeep a perfectly reasonable excuse for not being at the tutor. Arthur feels bad about not trusting Angie and removes the punishment.
11	"Family Table"	November 23, 2004	111
Arthur's father reminds him about the family dinners they would have that never really turned out as a family dinner. The father decides that they should have a family dinner again. Arthur and his father have a bet to see if he can bring the family together for a family dinner.
12	"Love Me Due"	December 15, 2004	112
Valentine's Day is celebrated by the Bindlebeeps, including Arthur, who shops for a special gift to knock Norma off her feet.
13	"It's a Roy's Life"	February 6, 2005	113
Roy has a crush on a girl at his school named Gina Antonelle. Arthur and Norma want to know more about Roy and his crush, so they ask Angie to find out more info about it. While he is getting closer to Gina, he neglects his other friend. Eventually Roy discovers Gina has a boyfriend, which causes him to feel a little sad.

=== Season 2 (2005) ===
No.	Title	Original release date	Prod. code
14	"Behind Open Doors"	May 17, 2005	201
Arthur starts jumping to conclusions when he finds a boy in Angie's room.
15	"Truth or Scare"	May 24, 2005	202
Roy and Arthur can't seem to admit things to each other such as Roy getting a 'D' on his report card and Arthur taking Roy's bike, which ends up being run over by someone's car.
16	"The Second Family"	May 31, 2005	203
Angie and John Kurtz are paired up in a mock marriage for social studies class. Not only does he annoy Angie, but also Arthur and his friends.
17	"The New Kid in Town"	June 7, 2005	204
After a boy sets Angie up, Arthur tries to make match-makers, only to make things worse by Angie thinking none of the guys are attracted to her.
18	"A Star Is Flunked"	June 14, 2005	205
Due to Arthur flunking a star football player, he may cause him to miss the big game against arch rival Jefferson.
19	"The Other Brother"	June 21, 2005	206
Norma's lazy brother arrives for a short visit, but he steals Arthur's thunder at every turn.
20	"One Flu over the Bindlebeep Nest"	October 23, 2005	207
Everyone (except Arthur) in the Bindlebeep family gets the flu.
21	"Cabin Fever"	October 30, 2005	208
Norma gets a big inheritance from a relative, but discovers that the money was supposed to go to a charity.
22	"Home Not So Alone"	November 6, 2005	209
Dr. Bindlebeep leaves with Norma and lets Angie watch Roy and Katherine.
23	"The Natural"	November 6, 2005	210
Katherine performs in a school play and is discovered by a talent agent.
24	"Pump Down the Volume"	November 13, 2005	211
Roy is practicing a rap song while he is supposed to be at track practice and Dr. Bindlebeep finds out. Roy reveals that he is making this song for a contest, the winner of which wins concert tickets.
25	"Round the Bend"	November 20, 2005	212
Dr. Bindlebeep's track team comes back in town to organize a rematch with the team they lost to when they were in high school.
26	"Birds, Bees, and Bindlebeep"	November 27, 2005	213
Dr. Bindlebeep wants to invite a speaker to talk to his students about sex, but is refused. Norma announces that she's pregnant. Series Finale

== Home media ==
Season 1 has been released on DVD, and all episodes were available via Amazon Video until November 2014, when they were removed in response to the allegations involved in the Bill Cosby sexual assault cases. The series has since been added back.
