= Neuropsychoanalysis =

Synthesis of psychoanalysis and modern neuroscience

Neuropsychoanalysis represents a synthesis of psychoanalysis and modern neuroscience. It is based on Sigmund Freud's insight that phenomena such as innate needs, perceptual consciousness, and imprinting (id, ego and superego) take place within a psychic apparatus to which "spatial extension and composition of several pieces" can be attributed and whose "locus ... is the brain (nervous system)".

Neuropsychoanalysis emerged as an interdisciplinary field of research after technological advances made it possible to observe the bioelectrical activities of neurons in the living brain. This allowed to differentiate where, for example, the need for food begins to show neuronally, in which area of the brain the highest performance of conscious thinking of the ego is focussed (s. frontal lobe), and that the department of the limbic system can permanently store (imprint, 'learn') the experiences partly initiated by the ego itself. The fact that experiences are stored in the brain structure in a retrievable way was already suspected by Freud in 1895 when he described this imprinting process as "a permanent alteration following an event". This assumption basically formulates the old philosophical thesis that the memory of living beings at birth is similar to a blank slate (on which 'experiences' are soon engraved more or less deeply) and characterises the main function of the superego.

The results of neuropsychoanalysis confirm Freud's three instances model of the soul (s. its technical elaboration in Metapsychology) Despite this advantage for psychoanalysis resulting from the technical possibilities of today's neurology, many analysts express reservations: knowledge about the anatomical structure of the brain cannot replace interpersonal dialogue and free association in psychoanalytic therapy; the organically precise localisation of the three instances in the brain contributes nothing to the understanding of dreams. Neither does it shed light on the instinctive behavior of the various innate needs of the id nor on the natural social interaction of the original Homo sapiens, as Freud noted when he lamented the lack of primate research. Without findings about the social structure of our genetically closest relatives, his hypothesis of Darwin's primordial horde (as presented for discussion in Totem and Taboo) cannot be tested and, where possible, replaced by a well-founded model. Because of this deficiency in contemporary science, Freud felt compelled to leave his metapsychology in the unfinished state of a Torso and to call once again for the future development of primate research in The Man Moses.

Apart from this, other critics of the neuropsychoanalytic approach point to the subjective colouring of the emotionally expressed needs or individually experienced traumas that are examined in the sessions of clinical psychoanalysis and claim that this cannot be fully reconciled with the objective nature of the findings of a scan of bioelectrical brain activity.

Proponents of neuropsychoanalysis counter this criticism by pointing out that Sigmund Freud himself was once neuroanatomist before he developed psychoanalysis, and further argue that research in this field has finally proven that the psychodynamic activity of the mind is inextricably linked to the neuronal activity of the brain. Indeed, advances in the imaging capabilities of modern technology have made it possible to study the brain's neuronal activity during a dream experienced during sleep, for example, the message of which is then deciphered using the tools of psychoanalysis. Proponents, therefore, point to the ability of current research to capture both the subjective content of psychic phenomena and the objectively given structure of the neuronal network in order to enable a better overall understanding and holistic healing methods through findings from both areas. Neuropsychoanalysis therefore aims to bring psychoanalysis, a field that is often seen as more humanistic than scientific, under a common umbrella that contributes to the wealth of knowledge it has gained.

== Theoretical base ==
=== Dual-aspect monism ===
Neuropsychoanalysis is best described as a marriage between neuroscience and psychoanalysis. Furtherhin neuropsychoanalysis seeks to remedy classical neurology's exclusion of the subjective mind.

The subjective of our perception consists of consciousness itself: its sensations, thoughts and feelings, and can be described as antithesis of the cellular matter that characterises the objectively given neurobiological structure of our brain. In contrast to this dual situation, Freud is often regarded as the pioneering founder of the modern science of the mind, aka psyche, whose research nevertheless remained rooted in the ground of such distinctly physical phenomena as Darwin's Origin of Species or the neuronal network of human's brain. Thus it can't be a question of that psychoanalysis aiming to split mind and matter. Also not Freud first, but Descartes came to the conclusion that both were two different types of "stuff": the thinking substance res cogitans on the one hand, and the extended substance on the other. Accordingly, he invented the dualism of the mind, the "mind-body dichotomy". Body is one kind of thing, and mind (or psyche) another. But since this second kind of 'stuff' does not lend itself to scientific inquiry, many of today's psychologists and neuroscientists have seemingly rejected Cartesian dualism.

Freud himself wasn't ignorant in this regard, on the contrary: he delved deeply into the duality of our conscious thought. Thus he wrote that essentially two things are known about the living soul: the brain with the nervous system and the acts of consciousness. Consciousness is given directly, it cannot be explored more through any description. In Freud's opinion, the fact that the findings of a biological phenomenon such as our living brain can be integrated between "both endpoints of our knowledge" only contributes to the "localization of the acts of consciousness", not to their understanding. (This radical view coincides with the current theory of Roger Penrose, according to which "proto-consciousness" emerge in the microtubules of cells, but can't represent anything that is somehow 'calculable'. Consciousness in its focal point is 'understanding'; it creates algorithms, for example, but doesn't itself represent an algorithm; it isn't a computer. Penrose's theory attempts to unite a proto mind with quantum physics and to anchor both in that energetic singularity from which cosmic and biological matter evolves up to homo sapiens, for example..) Thus, the soul (or id) for Freud is the "function" of the psychic apparatus, which is composed of two more complementary working instances, similar to how a cell is made up of its organelles or a microscope from its lenses. Anchored in the reservoir of Libido in direct reference to the universal desire that Plato assigned to Eros, Freud saw the monistic moment of his psychology in this drive energy, which branches out from the id into two main areas: the bodily urge to act and the mental urge to know. In this way, he takes account of the body-mind dualism, illustrating it further with his parable of a rider and his horse: man must restrain and direct the superior energy of his animal and enable it to satisfy its drives if he wants to keep it alive and the species healthy. The ego therefore has "the habit of putting the will of the id into practice as if it were its own".

Neuropsychoanalysis respond to this viewpoint by adopting dual-aspect monism, sometimes referred to as perspectivism. That is, our souls are monistic from their libidinal energy. We as living beings consist of matter - Cells, their superstructuring into organs, 'individual' living beings, instinctively social groups - and a spirit active in it. That's why we perceive the phenomena from two seemingly opposite perspectives.

=== Psychoanalysis as a foundation ===
Perhaps because Freud himself began his career as a neurologist, psychoanalysis has given the field of neuroscience the platform upon which many of its scientific hypotheses were founded. With the field of psychoanalysis suffering from what many see as a decline in innovation and popularity, a call for new approaches and a more scientific methodology is long overdue. The history of neuropsychoanalysis therefore, goes some way in explaining why some consider it the logical conclusion, and representative of an evolution that psychoanalysis was in need of. Since the mind itself is viewed as purely ontological, our appreciation of reality is dependent on neurobiological functions of the brain, which we can use to observe "subjectively," from inside, how we feel and what we think. Freud refined this kind of observation into free association. He claimed that this is the best technique that we have for perceiving complex mental functions that simple introspection will not reveal. Through psychoanalysis, we can discover mind's unconscious functioning.

=== Neuroscience as a foundation ===
Due to the very nature of neuropsychoanalysis, those working in this burgeoning field have been able to draw insights from a number of neuroscientists. Notable scientists foundational to the development of neuropsychoanalysis include:

- Antonio Damasio
- Eric Kandel
- Joseph LeDoux
- Helen Mayberg
- Jaak Panksepp
- VS Ramachandran
- Oliver Sacks
- Mark Solms

Neuroscientists, often studying the same cognitive functions of the brain as psychoanalysts, do so in quantitative methods such as dissection post mortem, small lesions administered to create certain curative effects, or with the visual and objective aid of brain imaging, all of which enable researchers to trace neurochemical pathways and build a more accurate understanding of the physical functioning of the brain. Another branch of neuroscience also observes the "mind" from outside, that is, by means of neurological examination. This is often done in the form of physical tests, such as questionnaires, the Boston Naming test or Wisconsin Sorting, creating bisecting lines, acting out how one performs daily tasks such as a screwdriver, just to name a few. Neurologists can compare the changes in psychological function that the neurological examination shows with the associated changes in the brain, either post mortem or by means of modern imaging technology. Much of neuroscience aims to break down and tease out the cognitive and biological functions behind both conscious and unconscious actions within the brain. In this way it is no different than psychoanalysis, which has had similar goals since its inception. Therefore, to ignore the additional insight neuroscience can offer psychoanalysis would be to limit a huge source of knowledge that can only enhance psychoanalysis as a whole.

== Models of pathologies ==
=== Depression ===
Heinz Böker and Rainer Krähenman proposed a model of depression as dysregulation of the relationship between the self and the other. This psychodynamic model, is related to the neurobiological model of the default mode network, DMN, and the executive network, EN, of the brain, noting experimentally the DMN seemed to be more active in depressed patients. The psychological construct of rumination is conceptualized which is experimentally more common in depressed patients, is viewed as equivalent to the cognitive processing of the self, and therefore the activation of the DMN. Similarly, experimentally measurable constructs of attribution bias are viewed as being related to this "cognitive processing of self". It has been shown that forms of psychodynamic therapy for depression have effects on the activation of several areas of the brain.

== History ==
Neuropsychoanalysis as a discipline can be traced as far back as Sigmund Freud's manuscript, "Project for a Scientific Psychology". Written in 1895, but only published posthumously, Freud developed his theories of the neurobiological function of the storage of memory in this work. His statement, based on his theory that memory is biologically stored in the brain by, "a permanent alteration following an event", had a prophetic insight into the empirical discoveries that would corroborate these theories close to 100 years later. Freud speculated that psychodynamics and neurobiology would eventually reunite as one field of study. While time would eventually prove him correct to some degree, the latter half of the 20th century only saw a very gradual movement in this direction with only a few individuals championing this line of thought.

Significant advances in neuroscience throughout the 20th century created a clearer understanding of the functionality of the brain, which have vastly enhanced the way we view the mind. This began in the 1930s with the invention of electroencephalography, which enabled imaging of the brain as never seen before. A decade later the use of dynamic localization, or the lesion method, further shed light onto the interaction of systems in the brain. Computerized tomography lead to even greater understanding of the interaction within the brain, and finally the invention of multiple scan technologies in the 1990s, the fMRI, PET, and the SPECT gave researchers empirical evidence of neurobiological processes.

It was in 1999, just before the turn of the century, that the term "neuropsychoanalysis" was used in a new journal entitled with the same name. This term once was hyphenated to indicate that the conjoining of the two fields of study did not suggest that they had been fully integrated, but rather that this new line of scientific inquiry was interdisciplinary. With repeated use, the hyphen was lost, and the name appears as we see it today.

== Research directions ==
Neuropsychoanalytic relate unconscious (and sometimes conscious) functioning discovered through the techniques of psychoanalysis or experimental psychology to underlying brain processes. Among the ideas explored in recent research are the following:

- "Consciousness" is limited (5-9 bits of information) compared to emotional and unconscious thinking based in the limbic system. Note: Solm's book showed as reference in the footnote does not provide such an information. It may be confused with the capacity of short-term memory.
- Secondary-process, reality-oriented thinking can be understood as frontal lobe executive control systems.
- Dreams, confabulations, and other expressions of primary-process thinking are meaningful, wish-fulfilling manifestations of the loss of frontal executive control of mesocortical and mesolimbic "seeking" systems.
- Freud's "libido" corresponds to a dopaminergic seeking system
- Drives can be understood as a series of basic emotions (prompts to action) anchored in pontine regions, specifically the periaqueductal gray, and projecting to cortex: play; seeking; caring; fear; anger; sadness. Seeking is constantly active; the others seek appropriate consummations (corresponding to Freud's "dynamic" unconscious).
- Seemingly rational and conscious decisions are driven from the limbic system by emotions which are unconscious.
- Infantile amnesia (the absence of memory for the first years of life) occurs because the verbal left hemisphere becomes activated later, in the second or third year of life, after the non-verbal right hemisphere. But infants can and do have procedural and emotional memories.
- Infants' first-year experiences of attachment and second-year (approximately) experiences of disapproval lay down pathways that regulate emotions and profoundly affect adult personality.
- Oedipal behaviors (observable in primates) can be understood as the effort to integrate lust systems (testosterone-driven), romantic love (dopamine-driven), and attachment (oxytocin-driven) in relation to key persons in the environment.
- Differences between the sexes are more biologically-based and less environmentally-driven than Freud believed.

== See also ==
- Clinical neuroscience
- List of psychology disciplines
- Psychoanalysis § Criticism
