= Fatherhood (book) =

Book by Ralph Schoenstein

- Author: Ralph Schoenstein
- Language: English
- Subject: Parenting
- Publisher: Doubleday & Company
- Publication date: 1986
- Publication place: United States
- Media type: Print
- Pages: 178
- ISBN: 0-385-23410-4
- OCLC: 13123074
- Dewey Decimal: 306.8/742 19
- LC Class: HQ756.C67 1986

Fatherhood is a 1986 book attributed to Bill Cosby and published by Doubleday & Company. The book was ghostwritten by humorist Ralph Schoenstein. The introduction and afterword were written by American psychiatrist Alvin F. Poussaint. The Canadian National Institute for the Blind published an audio cassette edition of Fatherhood with narration by Bob Askey.

Another audiobook edition, published in 2008, was read by actor Malcolm-Jamal Warner, who appeared alongside Cosby in the sitcom The Cosby Show from 1984 to 1992.

== In other media ==
In the episode of The Simpsons, “Saturdays of Thunder”, which first aired in November 1991, Homer Simpson tries to apply advice from Fatherhood to win the respect of his son Bart. In the episode “Dog of Death”, which first aired in March 1992, the book can be seen burning in the Simpsons’ fireplace.

Cosby's follow-up book, Childhood, published in November 1992, emulated the style with which Schoenstein wrote Fatherhood. Comedian Paul Reiser’s books Babyhood (1996) and Couplehood (1998) too are pastiches of Fatherhood.

In 2003, Bill Cosby, Charles Kipps, and the production company Smiley, Inc. adapted the book into an animated series. The series, which is also called Fatherhood, is about an African-American couple trying to be model parents to their three children. It premiered in June 2004 on Nick at Nite and aired for two seasons before being cancelled in 2005.
