= Parenthood =

Parenthood may refer to:

- Parenting, the process of being a parent
- Parenthood (film) (1989)
  - Parenthood (1990 TV series)
  - Parenthood (2010 TV series)
    - Parenthood (television soundtrack)
- Parenthood (2025 TV series), a British nature documentary television series
- Parenthood (Shameless), an episode of the American TV series Shameless
- "Parent Hood", an episode of Robin Hood
- The Parent 'Hood, a 1990s American TV sitcom
- The Sims 4: Parenthood, a 2017 game pack for The Sims 4
- "Parenthood", a song by Reks from the 2012 album Straight, No Chaser
