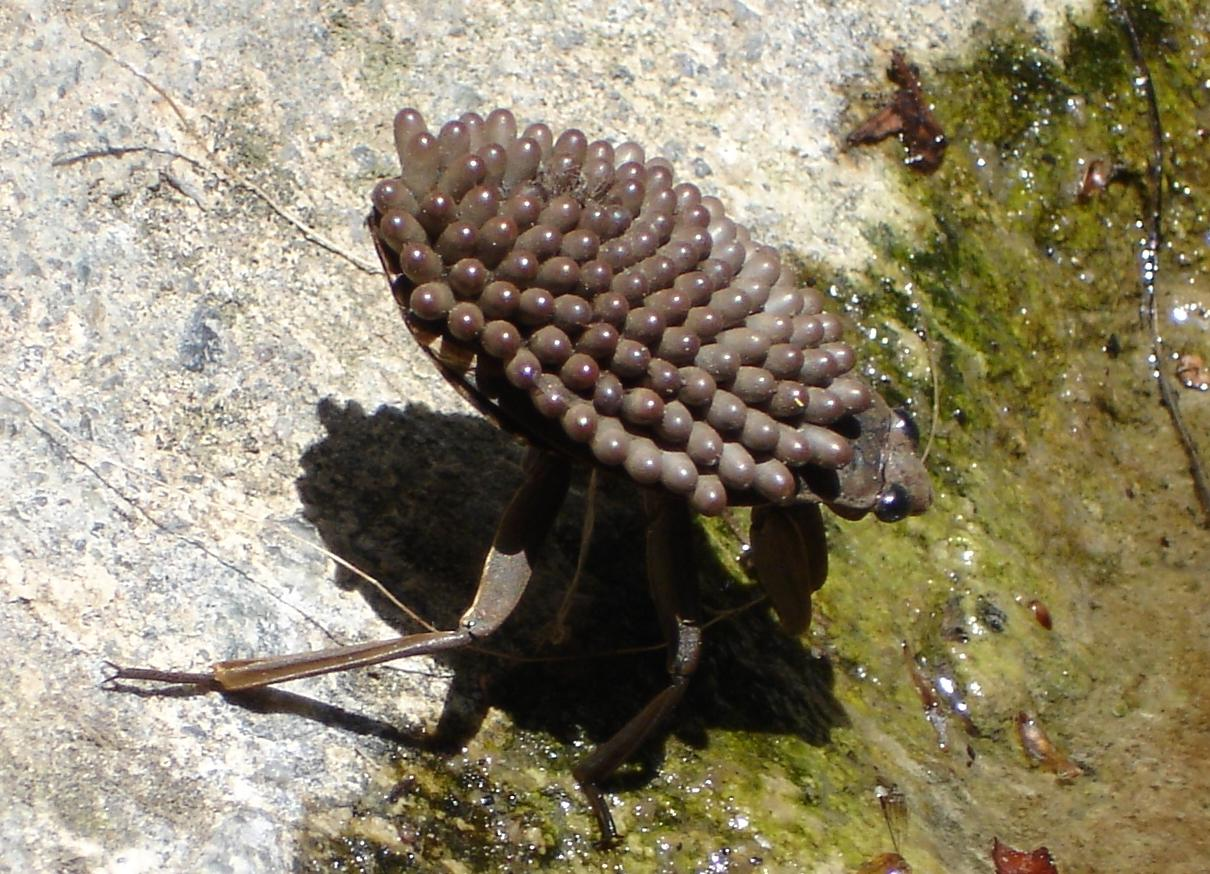
- Male with eggs on back

Scientific classification
- Domain: Eukaryota
- Kingdom: Animalia
- Phylum: Arthropoda
- Class: Insecta
- Order: Hemiptera
- Suborder: Heteroptera
- Family: Belostomatidae
- Genus: Abedus
- Species: A. indentatus

Binomial name
- Abedus indentatus (Haldeman, 1854)

= Abedus indentatus =

Species of true bug

Abedus indentatus is a species of giant water bug in the family Belostomatidae. It is found in Central America and North America.
