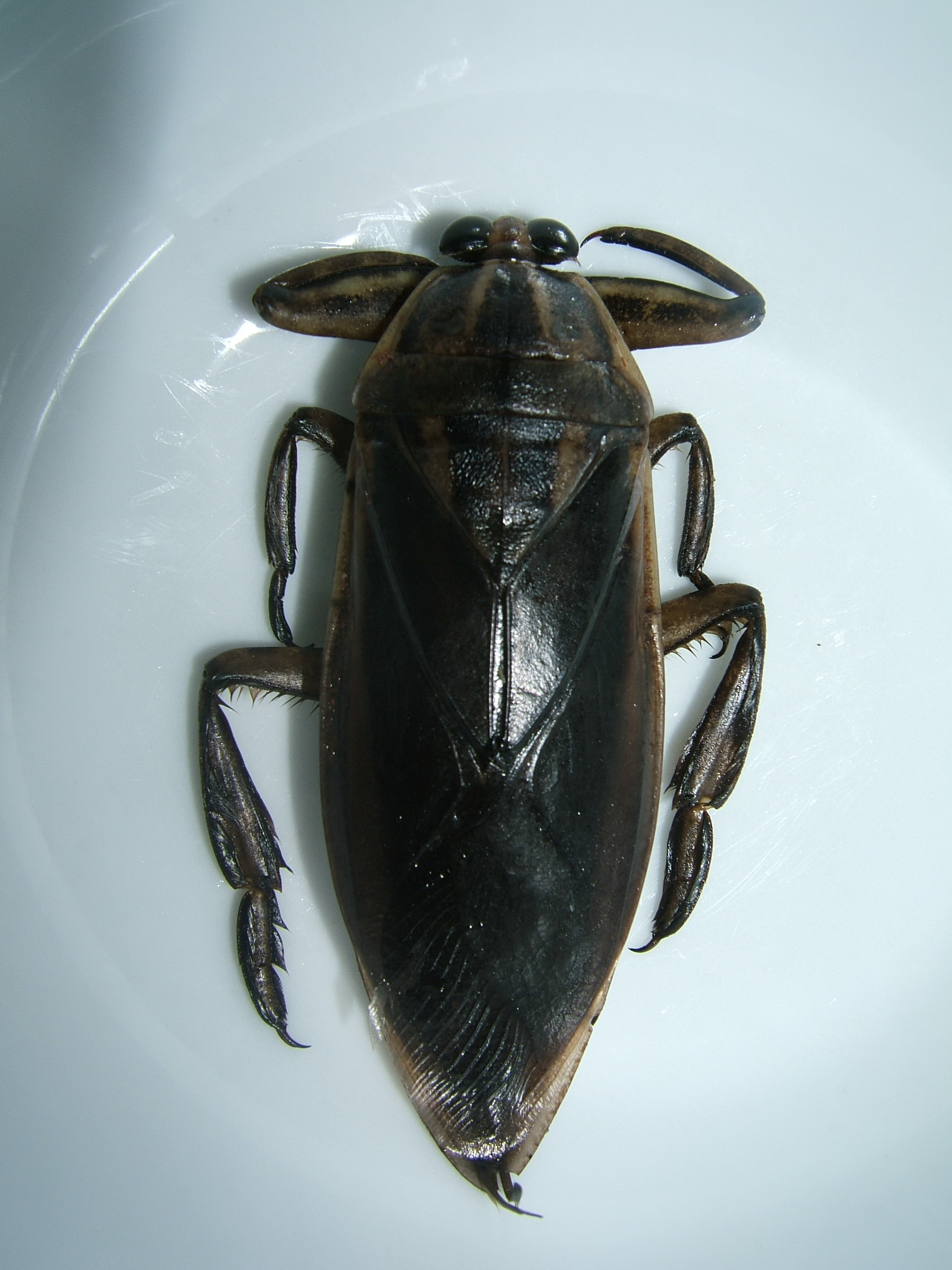
- Lethocerus indicus

Scientific classification
- Kingdom: Animalia
- Phylum: Arthropoda
- Clade: Pancrustacea
- Class: Insecta
- Order: Hemiptera
- Suborder: Heteroptera
- Family: Belostomatidae
- Genus: Lethocerus
- Species: L. indicus

Binomial name
- Lethocerus indicus (Lepeletier & Serville, 1825)

Synonyms
- Belostoma indicum

= Lethocerus indicus =

Species of true bug

Lethocerus indicus is a giant water bug in the family Belostomatidae, native to South and Southeast Asia, as well as southeast China, the Ryukyu Islands, and New Guinea. It was originally described as Belostoma indicum but is no longer placed in that genus.

This insect is well known as an edible species in a number of different Southeast Asian cuisines. The taste of the flight muscles is often compared to sweet scallops or shrimp.

== Description ==
The Asian region has several species of Belostomatidae including L. patruelis, L. insulanus, L. indicus, and Kirkaldyia deyrolli. L. indicus typically has a length between 6.5 and 8 cm (2.6 and 3.1 in). Lethocerus insulanus is found along the islands of Southeast Asia to northern Australia and has a medial dark stripe between the light stripes of the pronotum while patruelis (found from southern Europe to Myanmar) has narrower light stripes and the first tarsomere on the foreleg is longer than the claw (almost equal in L. indicus). Kirkaldyia deyrolli is paler and lacks pronotal stripes. The genus Kirkaldyia can be distinguished from Lethocerus by more widely separated eyes, and the presence of two asymmetrical furrows on the inner setal pad of the fore femur.

The species is distributed widely in peninsular India, Sri Lanka, Bangladesh, into Southeast Asia, extending east to Taiwan and south along Sumatra, Java, Indonesia, Philippines and parts of western Papua New Guinea.

Glands in the abdomen produce odorous chemicals that include (E)-2-hexenyl acetate, (E)-2-hexenyl butanoate, 1-undecen-3-one, 3-mercaptohexyl acetate, and 3-mercapto-1-hexanol which may have a role as an attractant particularly in males. The first two are said to impart a sweet banana-like smell.

== Research ==
The large size of this insect and its flight muscles and the ease of dissection makes it a model organism for muscle structure with special features pertinent to the cardiac muscle. The high degree of structural order makes is possible to obtain X-ray diffraction patterns richer and more detailed than those from vertebrate striated muscle.

== As food ==
=== Vietnam ===
The Vietnamese call this insect cà cuống. It is a highly prized food and often boiled and fried whole. The insect's essence (a pheromone produced by the male that attracts females) is harvested by collecting its liquid-producing sacs. That liquid is then placed in small glass containers. The insect is claimed to be scarce, and demand for the extract is high. Most of the cà cuống essence on the market is therefore imitation, with the actual essence fetching a high price. Cà cuống is typically used sparingly and eaten with bánh cuốn (rice noodle rolls) by adding a drop to the nước chấm (dipping sauce).

It is also eaten in a soup dish called 'bún thang' adding a unique essence to the broth. The dish traditionally includes rice noodles, thinly sliced egg crepe, pork cold cuts, and other various additions in a chicken/dry squid broth. A tiny drop of the extract on the tip of a toothpick would suffice to flavor the whole bowl of soup. This dish originated in Northern Vietnam.

=== Thailand ===
In the northeast region of Thailand, eating insects is common. In other parts of Thailand, including the Central and Southern regions, the aromatic essence from this species of insect, known as maeng da (Thai: แมงดา) or maeng da na (แมงดานา), is also popular. The water bug can be eaten whole and fried, and as an extract. Maeng da is used to make nam phrik maeng da, a type of chili sauce used as a condiment.

=== Philippines ===
In the Ilocos region in the northern part (Luzon) of the Philippines some insects such as crickets, locusts, and beetles are traditionally eaten. The water bug or water beetle is known as alukap in Ilokano language. It is sauteed or fried in oil, garlic, onions and tomatoes, or roasted, after the wings and legs have been removed, and eaten as a viand for steamed rice or as a finger food with liquor. The same is done in the Visayas region where it is called obus in the Visayan language.

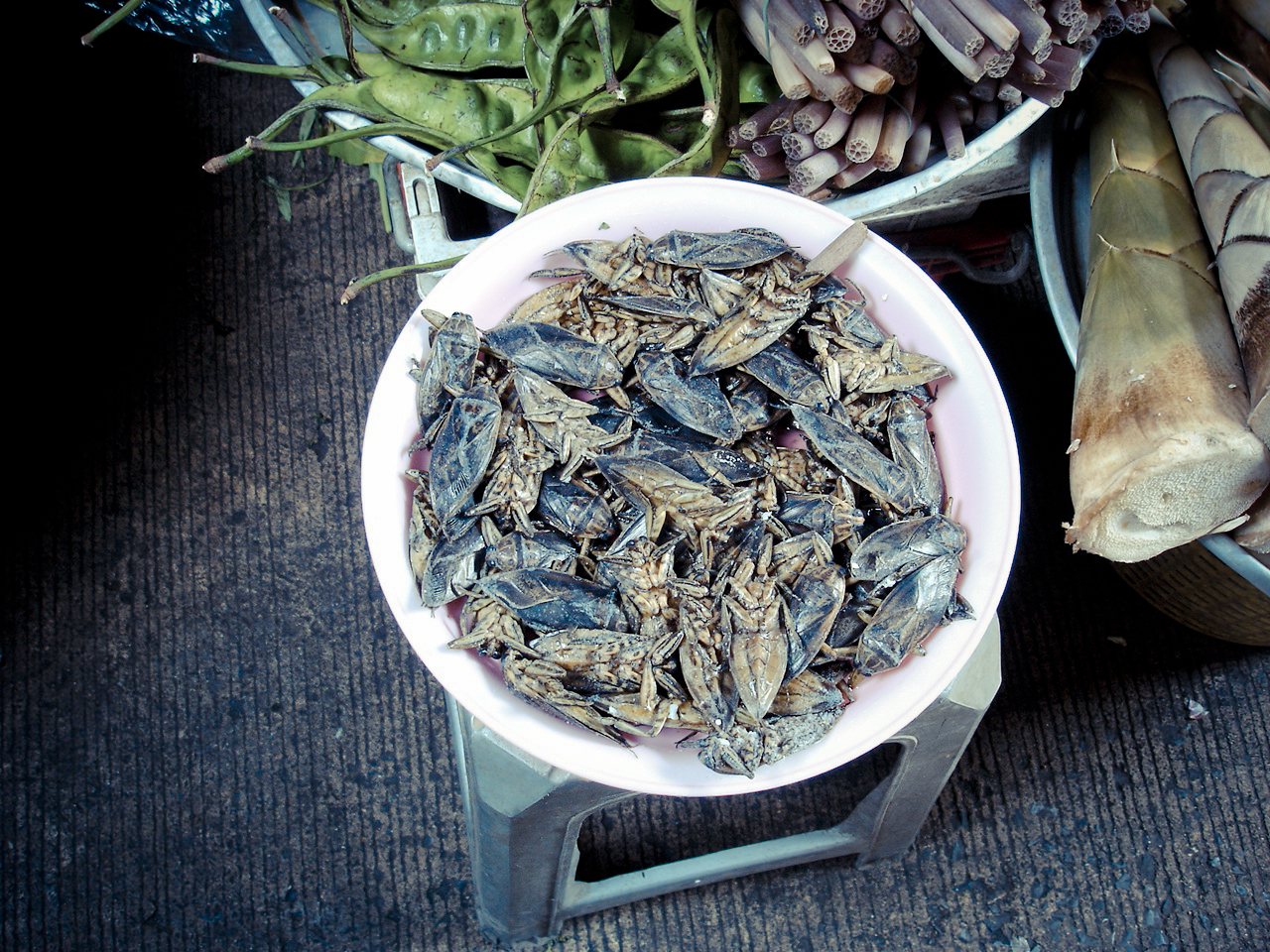
Giant water bugs in the market. Lopburi, Thailand.

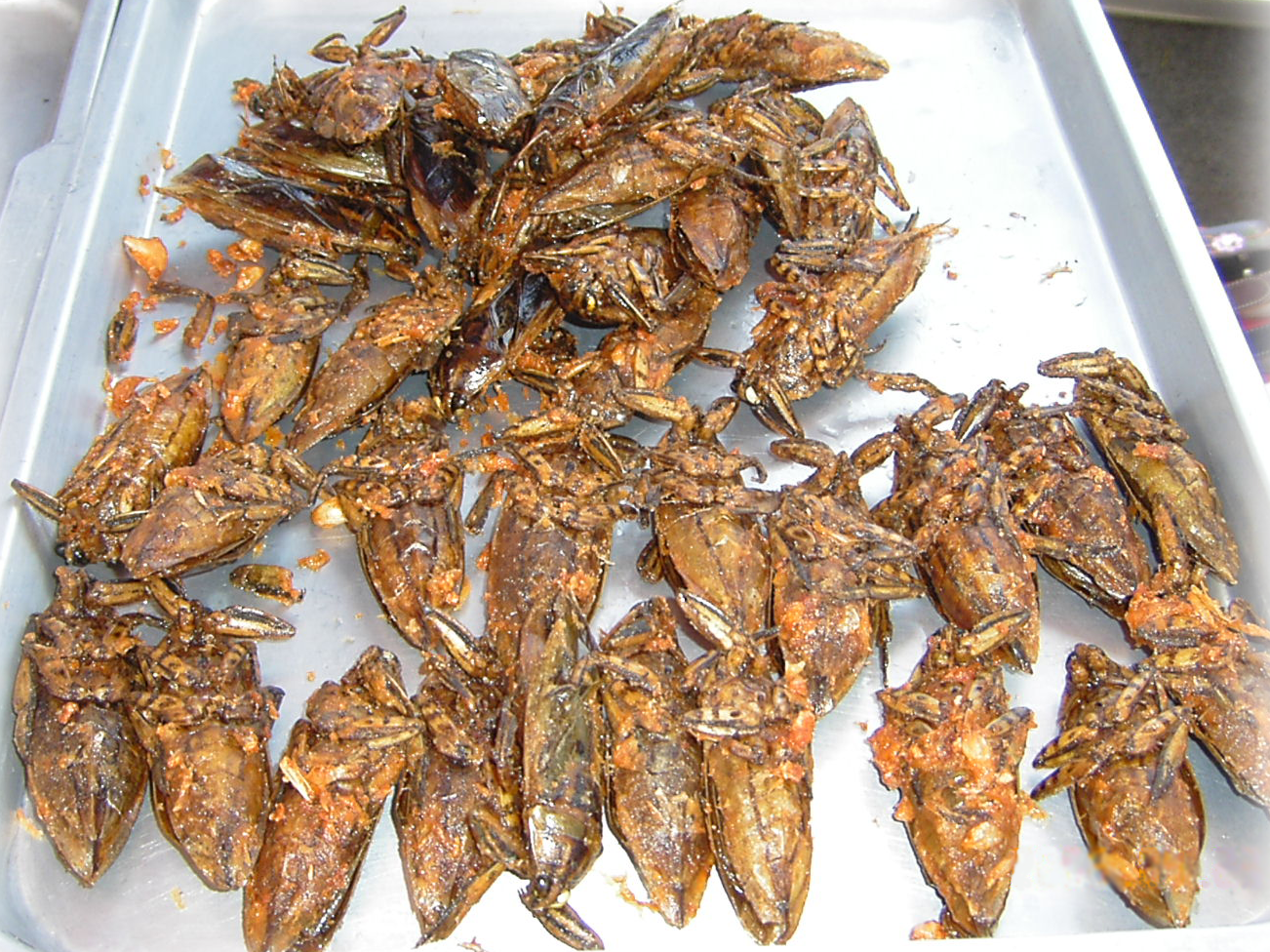
Fried giant water bugs.

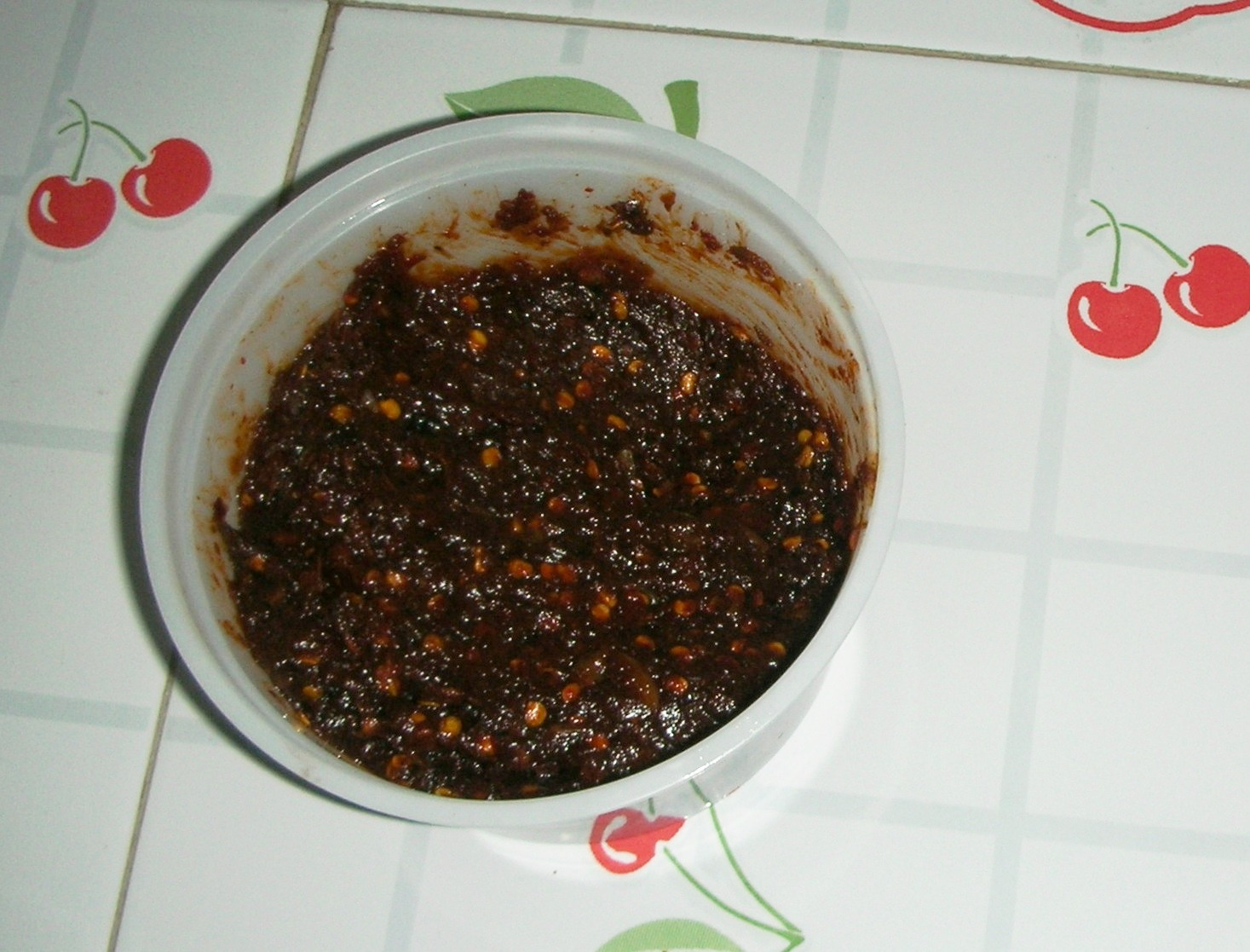
Nam phrik malaeng da made with crushed Lethocerus indicus.

=== North-East India ===
- Lethocerus indicus*, also known as the giant water bug, is consumed as an edible insect in parts of Northeast India, notably in Assam and Manipur. Among various ethnic groups, including the Mising, Karbi, Rengma Naga, and Bodo communities in Assam, as well as different tribes in Manipur, the insect is traditionally prepared by frying or making it into a paste, often served as chutney.

Consumption of *Lethocerus indicus* is valued for its nutritional benefits, including high protein content, and forms part of a broader cultural practice of entomophagy in the region. The insect is called *Gangjema* locally in some communities, and its preparation methods vary, but it is often fried or made into a savory dish.

In addition to Assam and Manipur, tribes in Nagaland and Mizoram also consume edible insects, often prepared based on traditional culinary practices.

== See also ==
- List of Thai ingredients

== Bibliography ==
- Gene DeFoliart of food-insects.com
- Bekyarova, T. I., Baumann, B. A .J., Reedy, M. C., Tregear, R. T., Ward, A., Krzic, U., Prince, K. M., Reconditi, M., Gore, D., Irving, T. C., and Reedy, M. K. "Crossbridges as Passive Brakes: Reverse Actin Sliding Triggers Strong Myosin Binding That Moves Tropomyosin"PNAS 105:10372-10377 (2008).
