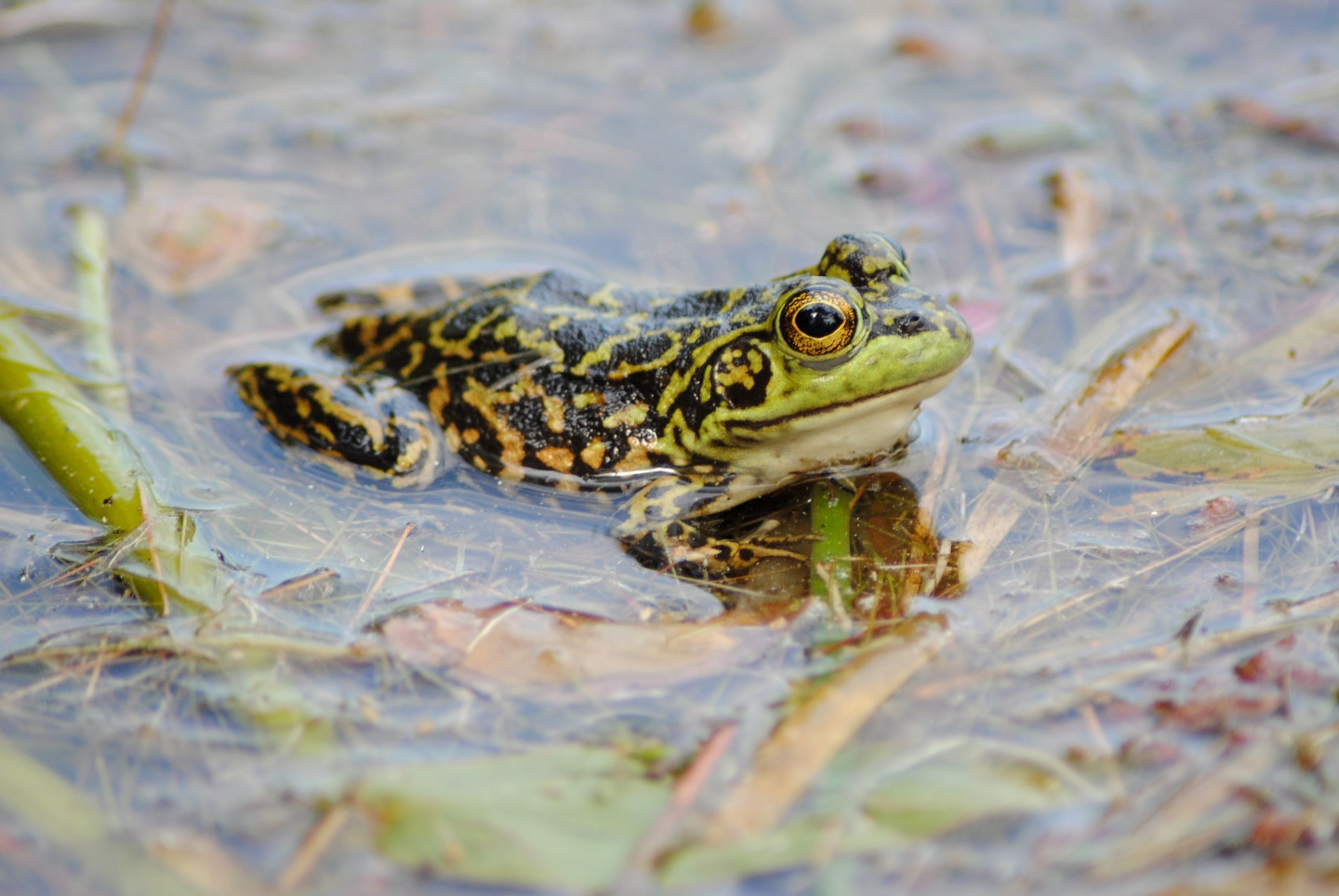

Conservation status
- Least Concern (IUCN 3.1)

- Secure (NatureServe)

Scientific classification
- Kingdom: Animalia
- Phylum: Chordata
- Class: Amphibia
- Order: Anura
- Family: Ranidae
- Genus: Lithobates
- Species: L. septentrionalis

Binomial name
- Lithobates septentrionalis (Baird, 1854)
- Range of L. septentrionalis

Synonyms
- Rana septentrionalis Baird, 1854; Rana sinuata Baird, 1854; Aquarana septentrionalis (Baird, 1854)

= Mink frog =

Species of amphibian

The mink frog (Lithobates septentrionalis) is a small species of frog native to the United States and Canada. They are so named for their scent, which reportedly smells like a mink. The scent is more akin to that of rotting onions to those unfamiliar with mink. It is also sometimes referred to as the north frog.

== Description ==
The mink frog is a small frog, growing up to 4.8 to 7.6 cm (1.9 to 3.0 in). The dorsum is generally green in color, with darker green and brown blotching and the belly is a cream, yellow, or white. They are sexually dimorphic in that males typically have a bright yellow colored throat, while females have a white colored throat, and the tympanum of the male is larger than the eye, while the female's is smaller than or the same size as the eye. The frogs have a pale-colored underside and bright green lips.

== Ecology and behavior ==
The mink frog is predominantly aquatic, living among the vegetation (especially among lily pads) in ponds, swamps, and streams around wooded areas. They feed on a wide variety of things, including spiders, snails, beetles, and other invertebrates. As tadpoles they consume primarily algae and decaying plant matter.

=== Reproduction ===
Mating generally takes place in late spring and early summer. These frogs prefer cold, well-oxygenated wetland breeding sites where during the late night hours, but occasionally during the day, males call to attract females while floating on the water's surface or partially resting on floating vegetation. Between 500 and 4000 eggs can be laid by the female at any one time, generally in deep water. Egg masses are usually found close to floating vegetation and hatch within days of being deposited. Tadpoles remain in the larval stage for approximately one year before metamorphosing into froglets. Maturity is reached in a year for males, and two years for females.

=== Predation ===
Eggs and embryos are eaten by eastern newts. Tadpoles are eaten by eastern tiger salamander larvae, five-spined sticklebacks, giant water bugs, and North American leeches. Adults are eaten by American bullfrogs (which are major predators of mink frogs). Other predators include green frogs, eastern garter snakes, great blue herons, wood ducks, spruce grouse, and raccoons.

== Geographic range ==
Mink frogs are found in the United States in the states of Minnesota, New Hampshire, Wisconsin, Michigan, Maine, Vermont, and New York. They are also found in Canada in the provinces of Nova Scotia, New Brunswick, Newfoundland and Labrador, Quebec, Ontario, and Manitoba. This largely aquatic frog's southern range limit is at the highest latitude of any North American frog and there is evidence that more southern populations of this frog became extinct within the past century.

== Conservation status ==
In recent years, it seems that the general populations of mink frogs are in decline. In a 1999 study conducted by David Gardiner and David Hoppe it was noted that there was an increase in mink frog deformities. "The spectrum of deformities includes missing limbs, truncated limbs, extra limbs (including extra pelvic girdles), and skin webbings. We also describe a newly recognized malformation of the proximal-distal limb axis, a bony triangle. In this abnormality, the proximal and distal ends of the bone are adjacent to one another forming the base of a triangle. The shaft of the bone is bent double and protrudes laterally, the midpoint of the bone forming the apex of the triangle." The study comes to the conclusion that these deformities are a result of exposure to exogenous retinoids, but more study is needed to make a sure determination.
