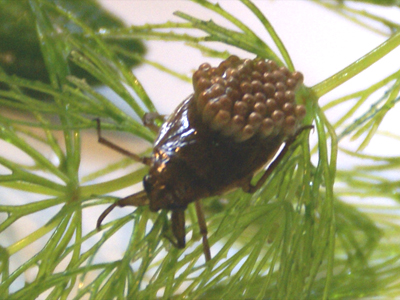
- Male with eggs

Scientific classification
- Domain: Eukaryota
- Kingdom: Animalia
- Phylum: Arthropoda
- Class: Insecta
- Order: Hemiptera
- Suborder: Heteroptera
- Family: Belostomatidae
- Genus: Appasus
- Species: A. japonicus

Binomial name
- Appasus japonicus Vuillefroy, 1864

Synonyms
- Diplonychus japonicus (Vuillefroy, 1864)

= Appasus japonicus =

Species of true bug

Appasus japonicus is a species of giant water bug in the family Belostomatidae. It is found in Japan and Korea, and has been much studied because it provides an example, rare among insects, of paternal care of the young. With the destruction of its typical habitat and its poor dispersal abilities, it has been listed as being an endangered species in Japan.

== Description ==
Appasus japonicus grows to a length of about 16 to 21 mm (0.6 to 0.8 in), rather smaller than the otherwise similar Appasus major. Three clades have been identified genetically, two in Japan, separated by mountain ranges, and one in Korea.

== Distribution and habitat ==
Appasus japonicus occurs in freshwater habitats in much of Japan, but not in the Ryukyu Islands, and it also occurs in Korea. It is found in lakes and ponds, side pools and backwaters of rivers, marshes and bogs. As development has reduced these types of habitat, it has taken to living in rice paddies and agricultural water stores. It tends to inhabit warmer habitats than A. major, and occurs at lower densities.

== Life cycle ==
The male Appasus japonicus initiates courtship in this species by performing a series of up-and-down movements, a "pumping display". Females are attracted to mate with males that are already carrying eggs in preference to non egg-carrying males. After mating, the female lays its eggs on the back of the male, glueing them in place. The eggs form a pad, and other females lay their eggs alongside the first clutch, so that the eggs on a male's back may have several different mothers. A female lays up to fifty eggs, while a male's carrying capacity is up to about 150 eggs. The male carries the eggs and tends them until they hatch; this takes a month or so in the spring but about a week in the warmer waters of summer. When all the eggs have hatched, the male resumes breeding activities, and may carry four batches of eggs during the course of one year, between April and August.

== Ecology ==
The front pair of legs is modified for grabbing and holding prey. The proboscis is used to stab the prey and then inject it with a toxic saliva, after which the bug sucks out the liquefied contents. The diet consists mostly of water snails and aquatic insects.
