= L. americanus =

L. americanus may refer to:

- Lathyrus americanus, a vine species in the genus Lathyrus
- Leptoconops americanus, a midge species in the genus Leptoconops
- Leptodus americanus, a brachiopod species in the genus Leptodus
- Lepus americanus, a hare species
- Lethocerus americanus, a toe-biter species
- Lophius americanus, a fish species
- Lotagnostus americanus, a trilobite species
- Lycopus americanus, a wildflower species
- Lysichiton americanus, a cabbage species

== See also ==
- Americanus (disambiguation)
