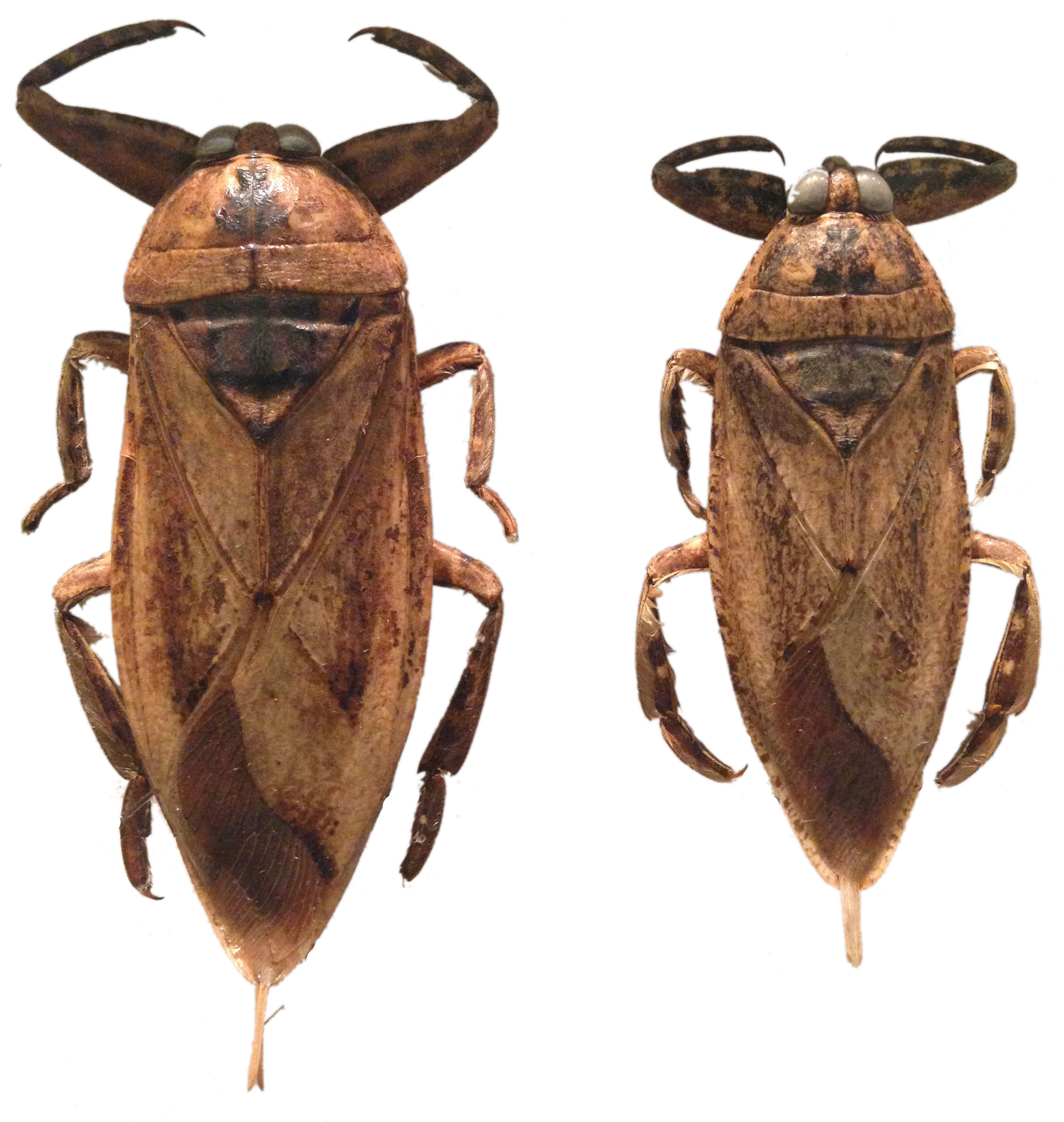

Scientific classification
- Kingdom: Animalia
- Phylum: Arthropoda
- Clade: Pancrustacea
- Class: Insecta
- Order: Hemiptera
- Suborder: Heteroptera
- Family: Belostomatidae
- Genus: Lethocerus
- Species: L. insulanus

Binomial name
- Lethocerus insulanus (Montandon, 1898)

= Lethocerus insulanus =

Species of true bug

Lethocerus insulanus is a species of giant water bug of the family Belostomatidae. Its common name is the Australian giant water bug, but it is also called the electric light bug or giant fishkiller. These names are also used for various other members of the family, including the other Australian species, L. distinctifemur, which is similar to L. insulanus.

== Distribution ==
Lethocerus insulanus is found in Australia, Papua New Guinea and New Caledonia. In Australia its distribution corresponds closely with the tropical and humid subtropical climate zones, including coastal and subcoastal Queensland and New South Wales as well as much of the Northern Territory. It is absent from southern areas of the continent including all of Victoria, South Australia, and Tasmania.

It inhabits still, freshwater bodies such as lakes and can also be found in floodwaters.

== Description ==
Lethocerus insulanus is a large insect and among the largest of the belostomatids, with adults typically reaching a length of 50–70 mm (2.0–2.8 in). It is the largest true bug species in Australia. It uses a posterior syphon like a snorkel to breathe underwater while hunting. It is an ambush predator of fish, reptiles, frogs and aquatic invertebrates and spends most of its time motionless in the water column. L. insulanus is winged and readily flies for the purposes of mating or finding new habitat.

=== Relationship with humans ===
The larger belostomatids are colloquially called "toe biters" throughout the parts of the world where they occur. Indeed, L. insulanus is capable of a highly painful "bite" if stood on, handled or disturbed. As hemipteran insects do not possess biting mouthparts, this is not a true bite but involves the water bug piercing the subject's skin with its modified proboscis or rostrum and introducing a combination of salivary enzymes, including proteases and amylase, the usual function of which is to incapacitate and digest its prey. This "venom" causes pain, localised tissue damage and swelling. There are no systemic effects however salivary proteases from insects are allergens known to cause anaphylaxis in some individuals.
