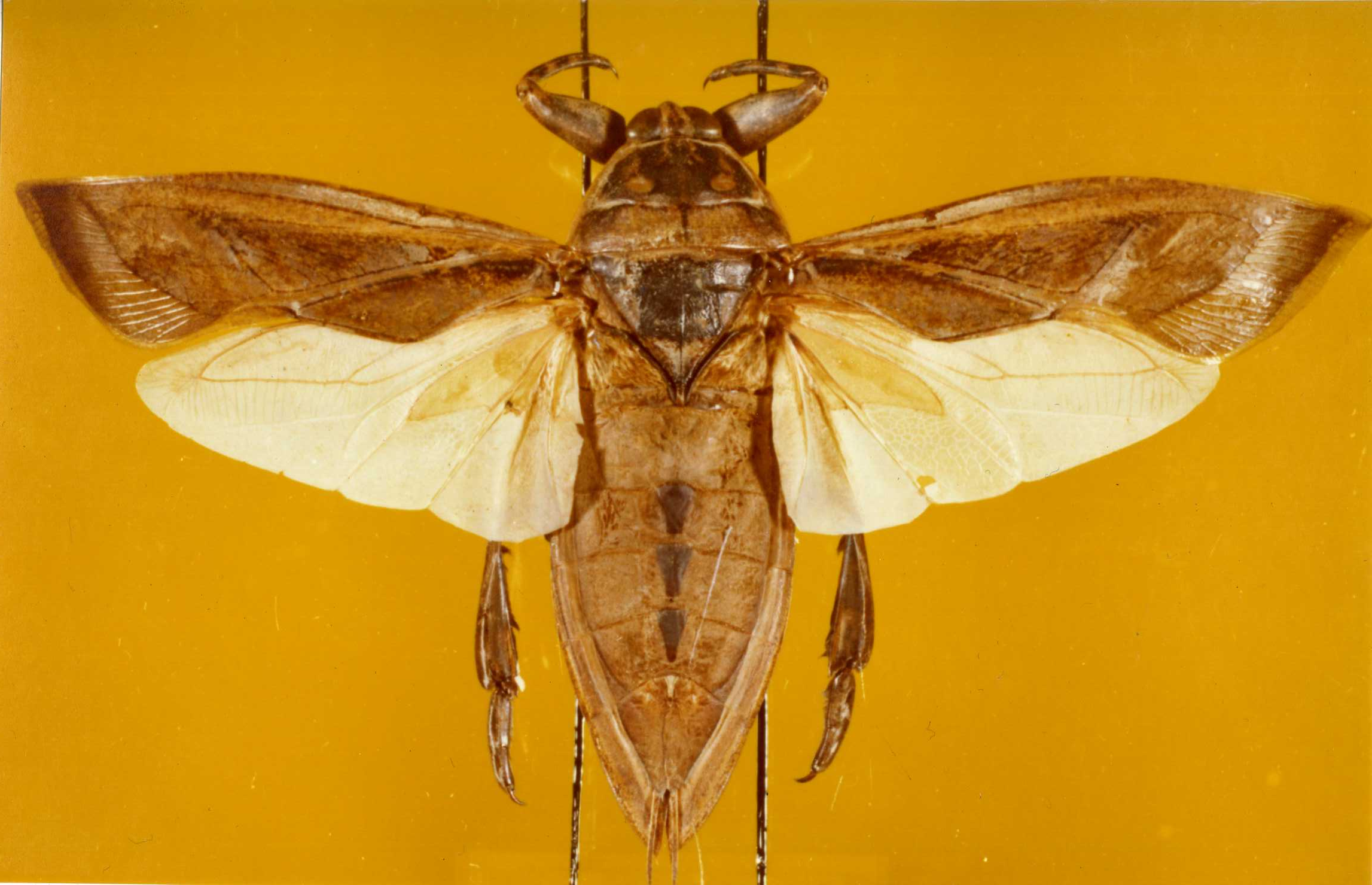

Scientific classification
- Kingdom: Animalia
- Phylum: Arthropoda
- Class: Insecta
- Order: Hemiptera
- Suborder: Heteroptera
- Family: Belostomatidae
- Genus: Lethocerus
- Species: L. maximus

Binomial name
- Lethocerus maximus De Carlo, 1938

Synonyms
- Lethocerus paraensis Lanzer-de-Souza, 1991

= Lethocerus maximus =

Species of true bug

Lethocerus maximus is a species of giant water bug in the genus Lethocerus. It is native to South America, but can also be found in the Caribbean.

It and the related L. grandis are the largest true bugs in the world, with L. maximus reaching lengths of up to 11.5 cm (4.53 in).
