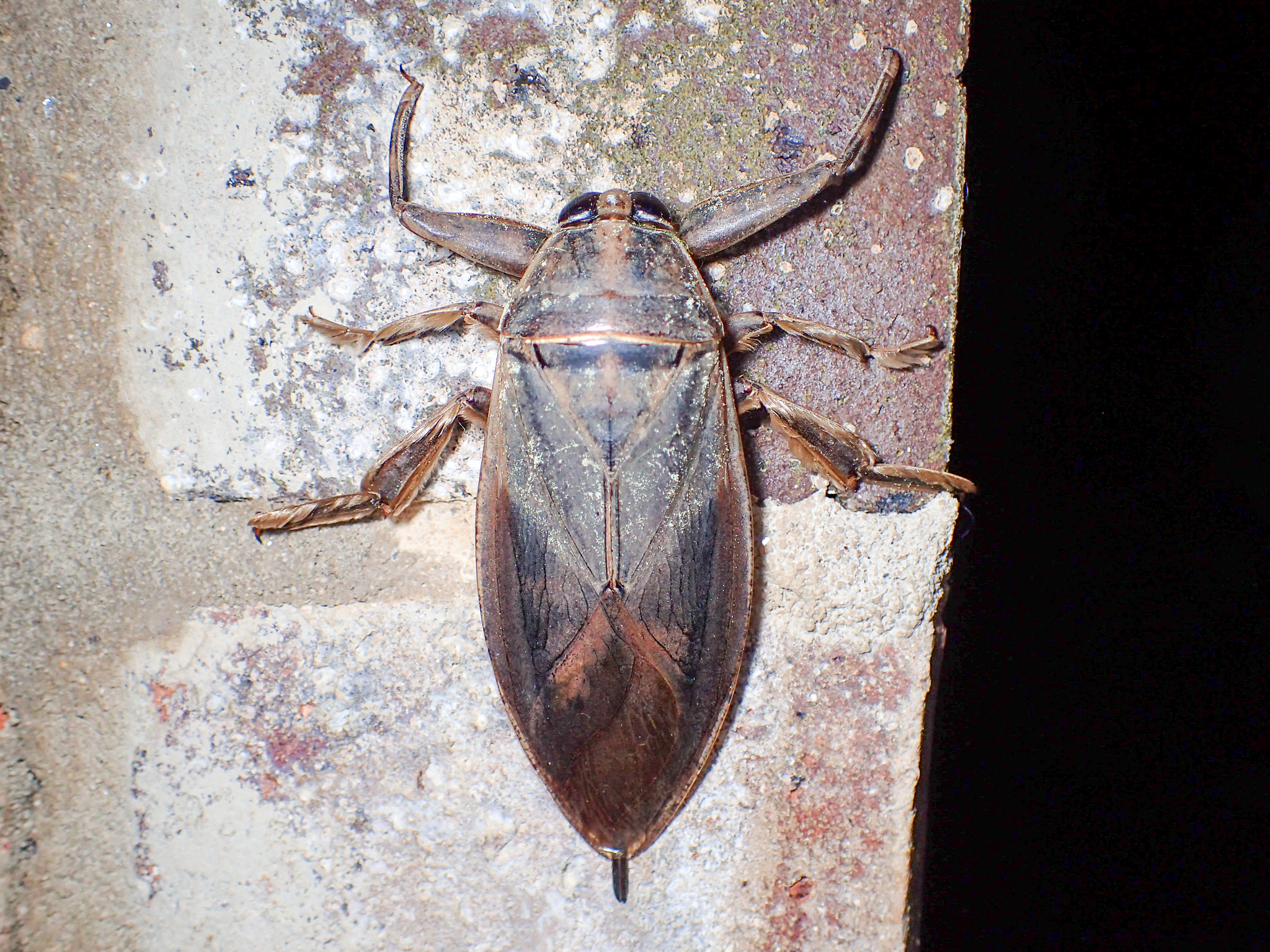
- Benacus griseus

Scientific classification
- Domain: Eukaryota
- Kingdom: Animalia
- Phylum: Arthropoda
- Class: Insecta
- Order: Hemiptera
- Suborder: Heteroptera
- Family: Belostomatidae
- Subfamily: Lethocerinae
- Genus: Benacus; Stål, 1861

Species
- B. griseus

Synonyms
- Lethocerus (Benacus)

= Benacus (bug) =

Genus of true bugs

Benacus is a genus of giant water bug in the hemipteran family Belostomatidae. Benacus is a monotypic genus, containing a single species, B. griseus, which is found in North America. Benacus was formerly considered a subgenus of Lethocerus.
