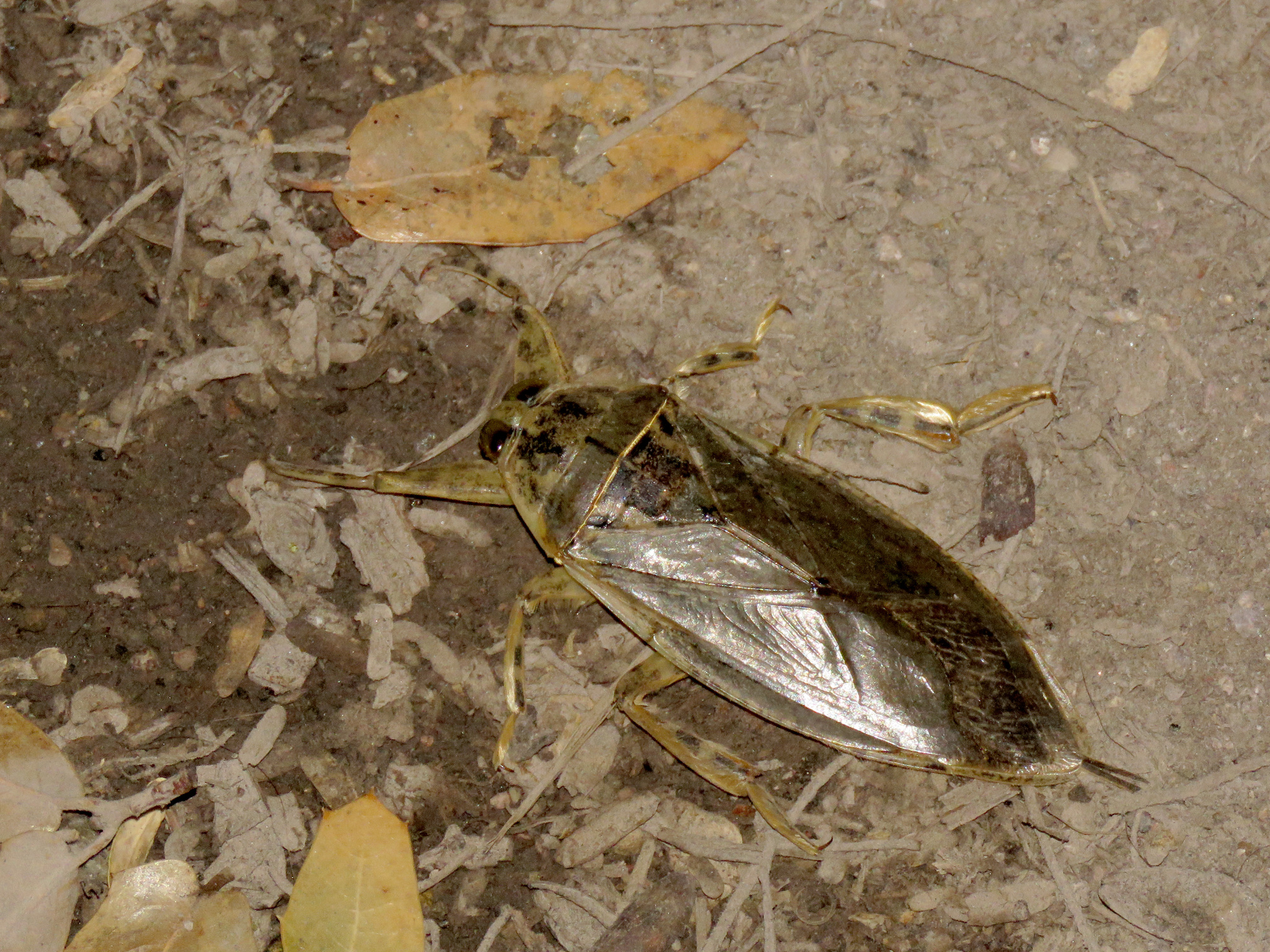

Scientific classification
- Kingdom: Animalia
- Phylum: Arthropoda
- Class: Insecta
- Order: Hemiptera
- Suborder: Heteroptera
- Family: Belostomatidae
- Genus: Lethocerus
- Species: L. medius

Binomial name
- Lethocerus medius (Guérin-Méneville, 1857)

= Lethocerus medius =

Species of true bug

Lethocerus medius is a species of giant water bug in the family Belostomatidae. It is found in Central America from northern Panama north throughout Mexico to southern Arizona, New Mexico, and Texas in the United States, and Cuba, Jamaica, the Cayman Islands, and the Bahamas.

They grow up to 49–58 mm for males and 62–63 mm of females.

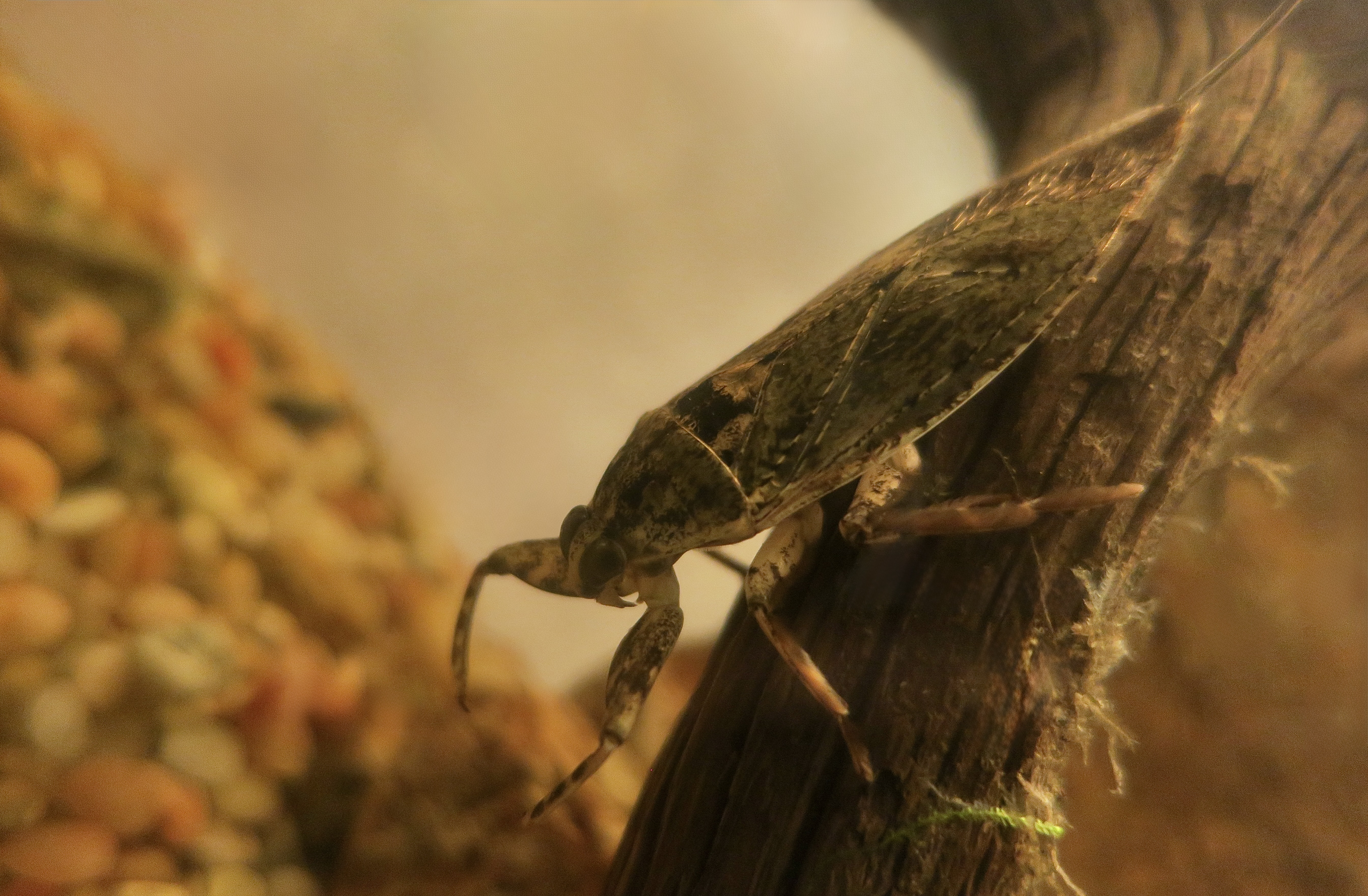
At Arizona-Sonora Desert Museum.

== Behavior ==
While giant water bugs in the subfamily Belostomatinae brood eggs on their back, species in the subfamily Lethocerinae oviposit eggs on objects above the water surface. Male L. medius provide parental care by moistening the eggs, shading them, and protecting them from predators by resting on top of them. This postzygotic parental care is a rare phenomenon which sets them apart from other Lethocerus in the Lethocerinae subfamily.
