= Horvathinia =

Scientific classification
- Kingdom: Animalia
- Phylum: Arthropoda
- Class: Insecta
- Order: Hemiptera
- Suborder: Heteroptera
- Family: Belostomatidae
- Subfamily: Horvathiniinae; Lauck & Menke, 1961
- Genus: Horvathinia; Montandon, 1911

Species
- See text

Genus of true bugs

Horvathinia is a small genus in the family Belostomatidae, and the only genus in its subfamily. Horvathinia are incredibly rare. In 2006, specimens were discovered in a wetland habitat.

== Distribution ==
Though it was originally thought to contain eleven species, upon recent reexamination, the number of species was reduced to two. Fewer than 100 specimens of the genus have been collected to date, and found only in a small part of South America in the border region of Brazil and Argentina.

It remains unknown what their habits are, where they can be found in the water (though there is some evidence that they may lurk in the muck at the bottom of ponds), what their position in the phylogeny of the water bugs is, or whether they brood their eggs as all other giant water bugs do. Some of these questions are currently being addressed by entomologists.
