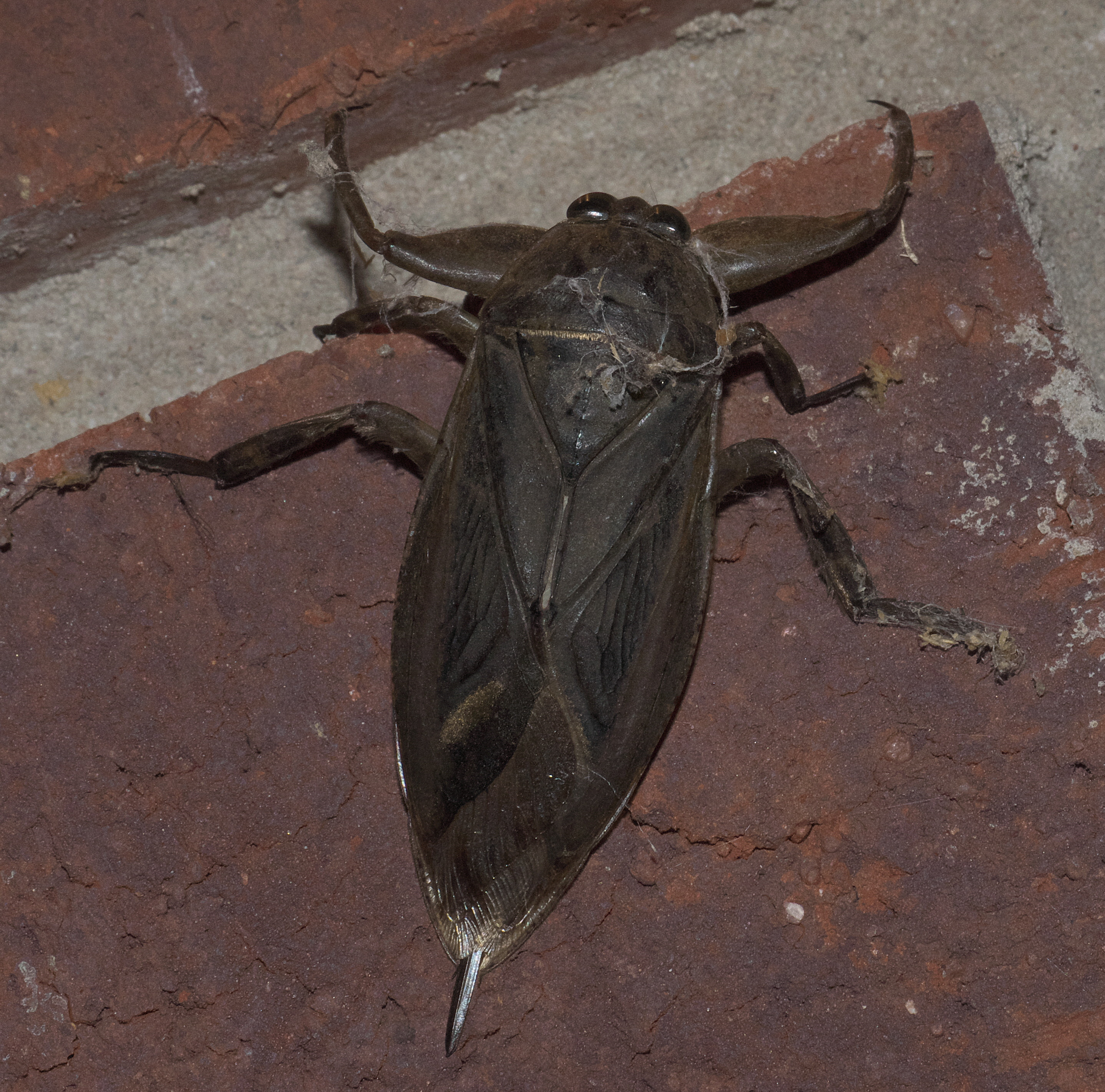

Scientific classification
- Domain: Eukaryota
- Kingdom: Animalia
- Phylum: Arthropoda
- Class: Insecta
- Order: Hemiptera
- Suborder: Heteroptera
- Family: Belostomatidae
- Genus: Lethocerus
- Species: L. uhleri

Binomial name
- Lethocerus uhleri (Montandon, 1896)

= Lethocerus uhleri =

Species of true bug

Lethocerus uhleri, or Uhler's water bug, is a species of giant water bug in the family Belostomatidae. It is found in eastern North America from New York, Michigan, and Wisconsin south to Florida and northern Tamaulipas.
