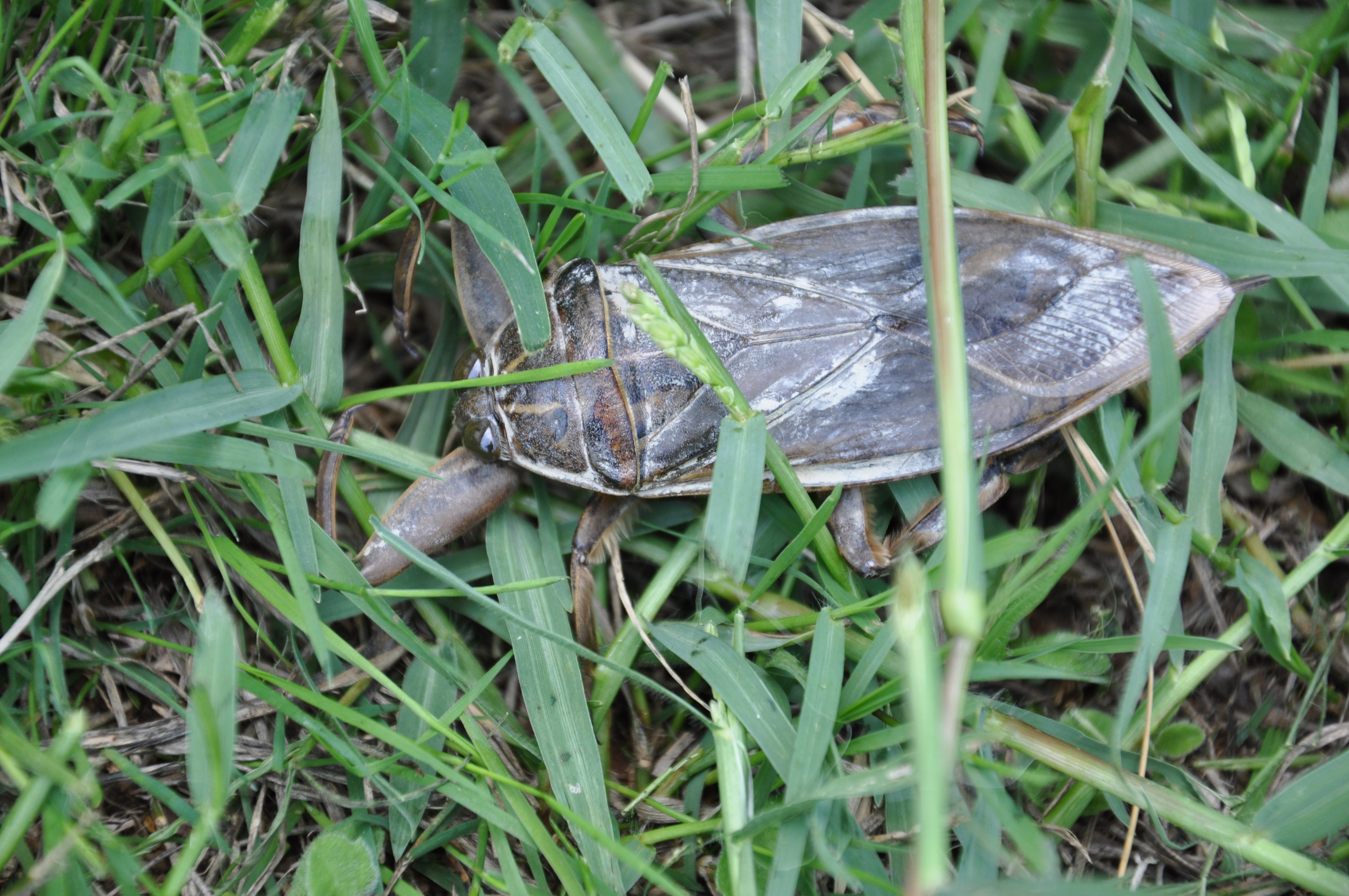
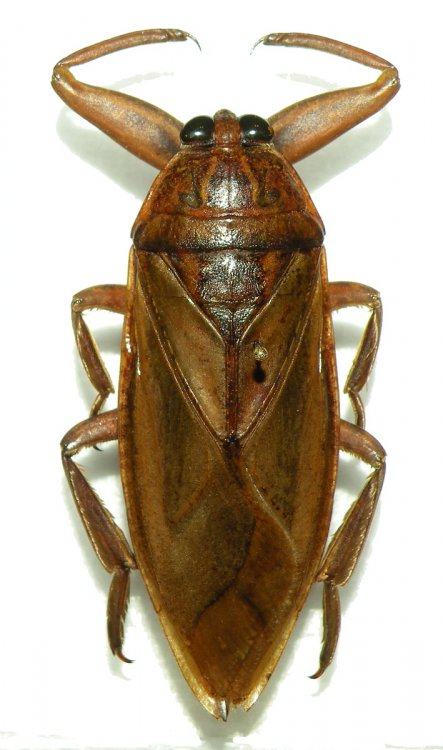
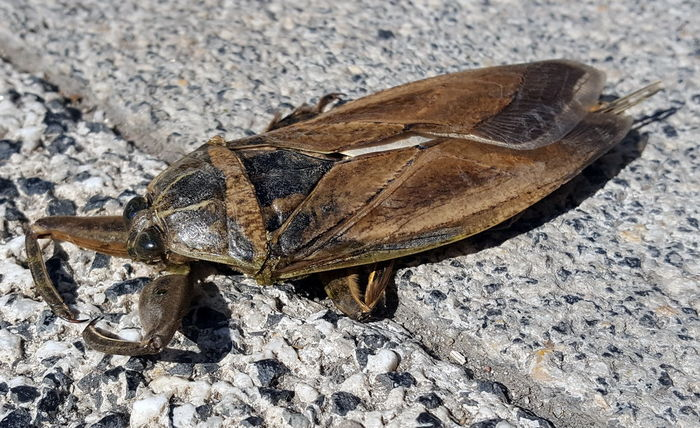
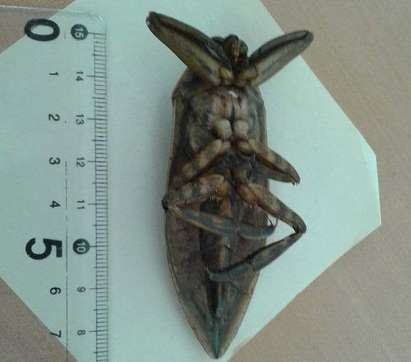

Scientific classification
- Kingdom: Animalia
- Phylum: Arthropoda
- Clade: Pancrustacea
- Class: Insecta
- Order: Hemiptera
- Suborder: Heteroptera
- Family: Belostomatidae
- Genus: Lethocerus
- Species: L. patruelis

Binomial name
- Lethocerus patruelis (Stål, 1854)

Synonyms
- Belostoma patruele

= Lethocerus patruelis =

Species of true bug

Lethocerus patruelis is a giant water bug in the family Belostomatidae. It is native to southeastern Europe, through Southwest Asia, to Pakistan, India and Burma. It is the largest European true bug and aquatic insect. Adult females are typically 7–8 cm (2.8–3.1 in) long, while the adult males are 6–7 cm (2.4–2.8 in).

== Description ==
Giant water bugs are large insects, brown to green in color, which helps the bugs to better camouflage themselves in their environment. The shape of the body is elliptical to oblong, dorso-ventrally flattened. Some specimen reach a length of up to 8 centimeters, although some other species in this genus can reach a length of up to 12 centimeters. Like other representatives of the Cryptocerata suborder, the antennae are short and invisible. The first pair of legs is adapted for catching and holding prey. The hemelytra are large and cover almost the entire abdomen of the animal. Beneath the hemelytra is another pair of wings, which allows these large insects to fly and migrate from one water surface to another if conditions become unsatisfactory. At the end of the abdomen, there are two tubular spiracles that serve to absorb oxygen from the surface, while the animal is immersed with its whole body and is waiting for prey.

== Distribution ==
Lethocerus patruelis inhabits a large territory, from southeastern Europe and the south of the Balkan Peninsula through Asia Minor, Pakistan, India all the way to Myanmar. Due to the recent climate changes, the progress of this species in the direction of the north on the territory of the Balkan Peninsula has been noticed.

== Biology ==
Like all other true bugs, the development cycle of Lethocerus is incomplete, i.e. hemimetabolic. Young nymphs hatch from the eggs morphologically similar to the adults and do not change their shape during growth, growing proportionally only. Both larvae and adults are obligatory predators and feed on other aquatic arthropods, tadpoles and small fish. Lethocerus is an ambush hunter that uses the stems of aquatic plants for support. When it catches prey, the giant water bug injects its saliva rich in digestive enzymes, and then sucks the dissolved tissue into the liquid with its rostrum.
