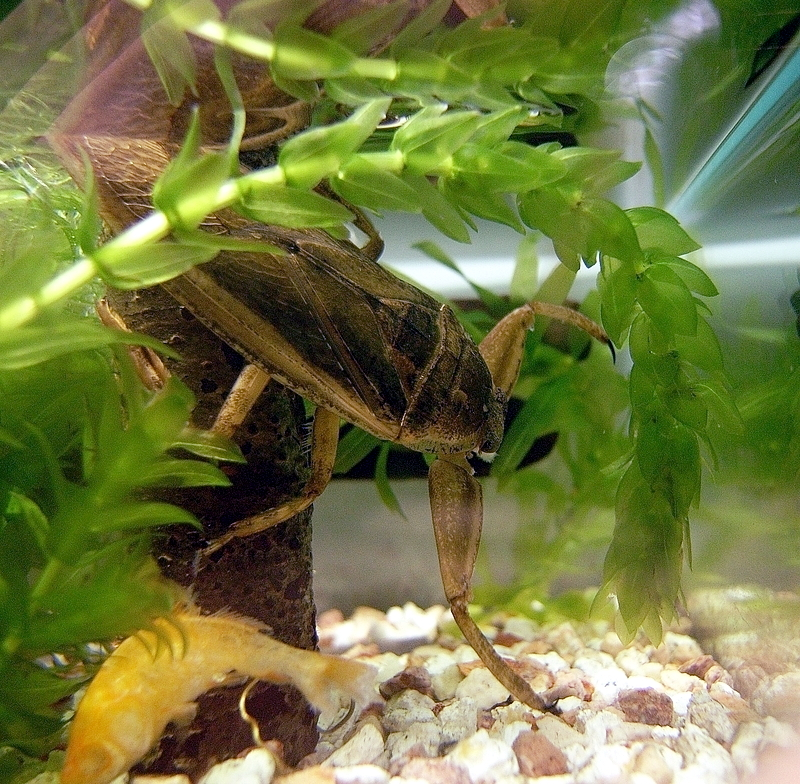

Scientific classification
- Kingdom: Animalia
- Phylum: Arthropoda
- Class: Insecta
- Order: Hemiptera
- Suborder: Heteroptera
- Family: Belostomatidae
- Genus: Lethocerus
- Species: L. deyrollei

Binomial name
- Lethocerus deyrollei Vuillefroy, 1864

Synonyms
- Kirkaldyia deyrollei (Vuillefroy, 1864)

= Lethocerus deyrollei =

Species of true bug

Lethocerus deyrollei is a species of giant water bug (family Belostomatidae) that traditionally is included in the genus Lethocerus, although recent authorities place it in the monotypic Kirkaldyia. They are large (4.8–6.5 cm or 1.9–2.6 in long), predatory and nocturnal insects. They are one of the best known giant water bugs and are found in India, Japan, Korea, east China, east Indochina, and the Amur region of Russia. They are very common in much of their range, but have declined drastically in some regions and are considered threatened in Japan and Korea. They live in still waters with vegetation, hatching in the summer months and then overwintering half a year later as adults. They primarily feed on small fish, amphibians and aquatic insects, but have also been recorded taking water snakes and young turtles.

The eggs of this species are laid out of water, generally on vegetation. Males exhibit parental care by keeping eggs damp. This is achieved by climbing up to the egg mass and having the water drip off their bodies onto the eggs. Eggs that are not kept damp in this way fail to hatch.

== Infanticide behaviour ==
Females of the species are known to destroy eggs guarded by males (ovicide, a form of infanticide), which secures care for their future offspring. It appears that a "counterstrategy" has evolved in males, which spend a much greater time with the eggs than is necessary to keep them wet. Most of the water is deposited on eggs within 90 seconds, but males have been reported to stay with eggs much longer than that. This is because males which stay with the egg mass cannot be detected by females. Brooding males will also attack female intruders, being successful in defending their eggs about one third of the time, though some are seriously injured in doing this. Males will only put up a fight as eggs are first being destroyed, and have been witnessed to abruptly cease defending their eggs and begin copulating with the encroaching female.

Infanticide has also been recorded in another insect, the burying beetle Nicrophorus orbicollis.
