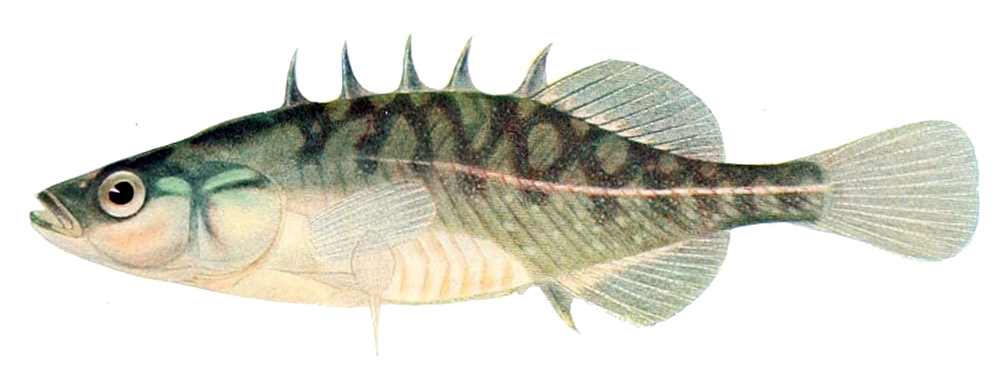

Conservation status
- Least Concern (IUCN 3.1)

Scientific classification
- Kingdom: Animalia
- Phylum: Chordata
- Class: Actinopterygii
- Order: Perciformes
- Family: Gasterosteidae
- Genus: Culaea; Whitley, 1950
- Species: C. inconstans

Binomial name
- Culaea inconstans (J. P. Kirtland, 1840)

Synonyms
- Gasterosteus inconstans Kirtland, 1840; Eucalia inconstans (Kirtland, 1840); Gasterosteus pygmaeus Agassiz, 1850; Eucalia inconstans pygmaea (Agassiz, 1850); Eucalia pygmaea (Agassiz, 1850); Gasterosteus gymnetes Dawson, 1859

= Brook stickleback =

Species of fish

The brook stickleback (Culaea inconstans) is a small freshwater fish that is distributed across the US and Canada. It grows to a length of about 2 inches. It occupies the northern part of the eastern United States, as well as the southern half of Canada. Small populations are scattered throughout the Mississippi-Great Lakes basin extending to Colorado, New Mexico, Kentucky, Tennessee, etc., though some of these areas are not native to the species. This small fish inhabits clear, cool streams and lakes. They eat small Invertebrates, algae, insect larvae, and occasionally their own eggs. They are also preyed upon by smallmouth bass and northern pike. Feeding time is usually dawn and sunset. The brook stickleback does have active competition mostly from minnows, but feeding times are different, along with diet. Spawning occurs in midsummer. Males secure a territory, build a nest, and mate with females. Males provide protection for the eggs, ward off predators, and usually die later in the season. The nests are built out of aquatic grasses. This is considered an annual species. Though the brook stickleback is not considered a threatened species, deforesting and changing waters are altering ecosystems of the species. Harvesting of trees around riparian environments is having a large effect of the stream ecosystem where the brook stickleback resides.

== Taxonomy ==
The brook stickleback was first formally described as Gasterosteus inconstans in 1840 by the American naturalist Jared Potter Kirtland with its type locality given as Trumbull County, Ohio. In 1876 David Starr Jordan proposed the monospecific genus Eucalia for the brook stickleback but Jordan's name was invalid because it was preoccupied in Lepidoptera. Culaea was then proposed as the replacement name in 1950 by Gilbert Percy Whitley. The brook stickleback is the only species in the genus Culaea which is classified within the stickleback family, Gasterosteidae. Culea is a near anagram of Eucalia which is a combination of eu, meaning "well" and calia, meaning "nested", and allusion to the sticklebacks' building of nests. The specific name inconstans means "variable" and is a reference to the variable number of dorsal spines and fin rays in the dorsal and anal fins.

== Description ==
The brook stickleback has a tapered body with a slim caudal peduncle and a fan-shaped tail. It very much resembles the ninespine stickleback (Pungitius pungitius) but only has five, or occasionally six, dorsal spines. It also lacks lateral bony plates. Most of the year the colouring is grayish or olive green with a varying amount of indistinct mottling, but during the spawning season, males are nearly black and females have darker and lighter patches. This species grows to a maximum length of 3 to 5 cm (1.2 to 2.0 in).

== Geographic distribution of species ==
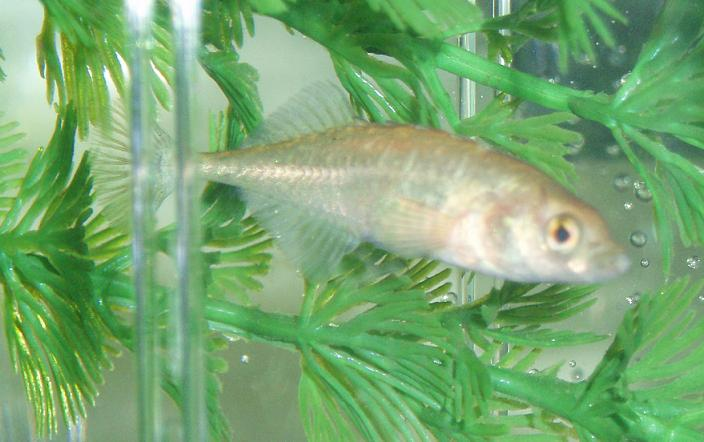
A brook stickleback in an aquarium.

Culaea inconstans occurs throughout the southern half of Canada and the northern part of the eastern United States. It is one of the smallest fishes in the region. Brackish water populations are uncommon but certainly exist. It extends down to the southern reaches of the Mississippi River – Great Lakes drainage basins. Populations also exist in Colorado and Nebraska to the west, and in Alberta, Saskatchewan, Manitoba, and the Northwest Territories to the north. Though these are typically the native ranges of the brook stickleback, the species has been introduced to Alabama, Kentucky, Tennessee, northwestern Colorado, Wyoming, northeastern Utah and California, and even in parts of South Dakota and Washington State. Certain geographical distribution studies have found that certain populations may have been native in New Mexico and still exist today. Nebraska does have brook stickleback populations, but they are generally found in small streams in the northern portion of the state. The fish have been found in Nebraska since the early part of the nineteen hundreds. River drainages that sustain brook stickleback populations are the Loup, Middle Platt, Niobrara, and smaller distributions in the Lower Platte, Missouri River tributaries, North Platte, and South Platte. Though the species appears to have an abundant distribution across North America, the Nature Conservancy has declared the species to be a S3 (vulnerable) level. Reasons for the level of vulnerability could be due to increased dam construction, especially in the eastern United States. This can lead to a destruction of habitat, increase in silted waterways, alteration of stream nutrient transport, and damaged breeding grounds. Alteration of stream dynamics could also lead to a change in predator frequency, thus exposing the brook stickleback to unforeseen predators.

=== Introduction in Europe ===
The brook stickleback was introduced in upper drainage of the River Inn in Bavaria. And in the 1960s was accidentally introduced alongside Micropterus species to Lake Lohjanjarvi in southern Finland, where it has become established.

== Ecology ==
As with a large geographical distribution, this species also lives in a wide range of flowing water habitats. Waterways such as rivers, streams, floodwater streams and drainages, lakes, ponds, potholes, hot springs, sinkholes, and seasonal melt water or spring fed ponds are all viable brook stickleback territories. Though the species can thrive in these habitats, primary spawning, breeding, and rearing grounds are located in shallow (< 1.5m) near shore environments with high vegetation cover and low velocity water. The species has a wide elevation range with specimens identified from sea level to ~ 2,400m.

=== Diet ===
The brook stickleback is an omnivore, with primary feeding tendencies toward aquatic insect larvae, adult terrestrial insects, crustaceans, fish eggs and larvae, snails, oligochaetes, nematodes, rotifers, and mites. However, brook stickleback feed on vascular plant material, as well as algae. Newly hatched stickleback larvae and planktonic crustaceans from both streams and ponds. Juveniles eat small organisms due to mouth size restrictions, and adults eat both large and small organisms.

=== Predators ===
Certain large invertebrates, birds, mammals, and fish all prey on the brook stickleback. With its small size, this species of stickleback has evolved piercing spines and protective plates to hinder predators. With this protection, as well as advanced anti-predator behavior, the brook stickleback is only a minor prey item. In a lab study, adult water bugs (Lethocerus americanus) and dragonfly nymphs (Aeschna spp.) both successfully preyed on the stickleback, but only in a night setting. Fish have been observed to be the most successful predator of the brook stickleback. Examples of these fish predators include yellow perch (Perca flavescens), rock bass (Ambloplites rupestris), creek chub (Semotilus atromaculatus), burbot (Lota lota), central mudminnow (Umbra limi), smallmouth bass (Micropterus dolomieu), largemouth bass (Micropterus salmoides), northern pike (Esox lucius), brook trout (Salvelinus fontinalis), rainbow trout (Oncorhynchus mykiss) and round goby (Neogobius melanostomus). Brook stickleback eggs can be cannibalized, as well as consumed by rainbow trout (O. mykiss). Competition among the ninespine stickleback exists. However, ninespine stickleback habitat exists in the pelagic zone, while the brook stickleback occupies the littoral zone. In the presence of fathead minnows (Pimephales promelas), the brook stickleback has a more diverse diet since the fathead is a more generalist feeder.

== Life history ==
For this particular species, spawning occurs in mid-summer. Brook sticklebacks migrate annually up affluent streams and creeks of rivers and lakes during the spring to spawn in weedy areas. Spawning occurs as males secure a protected territory and construct a nest. These nests are constructed using algae, roots, and aquatic vegetation. There is one entrance with no exit. When the female enters, she deposits her eggs by shaking violently. Each shake allows more eggs to be deposited. Once all the eggs have been placed, the female must push her way through the wall of the nest to exit. During this process, studies have shown that the female makes acoustic noises, which is thought to advertise to sneaker males, as this can increase the proportion of eggs fertilized. After spawning, the male assumes protection of the eggs which hatch in 7–11 days. New hatched stickleback can wander from the nest, but the male gathers them into his mouth to deposit them back in the protective nest. Spawning usually ends around mid-July due to swift temperature changes in the water. The newly fertilized eggs are vulnerable to slight temperature changes. These fish grow rapidly during their first summer and typically reach sexual maturity by spring of the next year. Most adults die within the spawning season or shortly after causing them to be deemed an annual species.

== Conservation ==
Although the Nature Conservancy has listed the brook stickleback as level S3 (vulnerable), the numbers of this species aren't threatened. The species is observed to be migrating westward and is seen as an invasive species in Wyoming. The strength of this species' success in its natural environment is seen in the amount of locations it has successfully colonized after the last ice age with the northern retreat of the glacial caps.

However, there is a potential for the population of the brook stickleback to decrease. The spawning season for this species is relatively short with high sensitivity to temperature changes. Global temperature changes are at an unprecedented rise, which could eventually lead to a global shift in water temperature. This could highly affect the spawning season for the brook stickleback species. Protecting the habitats is key to preserving the integrity of local ecosystems, as well as the integrity of the species. It is found that stable habitats allow brook stickleback to have a longer lifespan. The brook stickleback can be found from the northern parts of the Canadian interior all the way down to southern reaches of the United States.

Protection of this species should be on high priority because this species has led scientist in significant breakthroughs in sympatric and allopathic speciation. Tracking their progress in increasing or declining numbers would help conservationists categorize specific threats for that region.

== See also ==
- Gasterosteoidei
