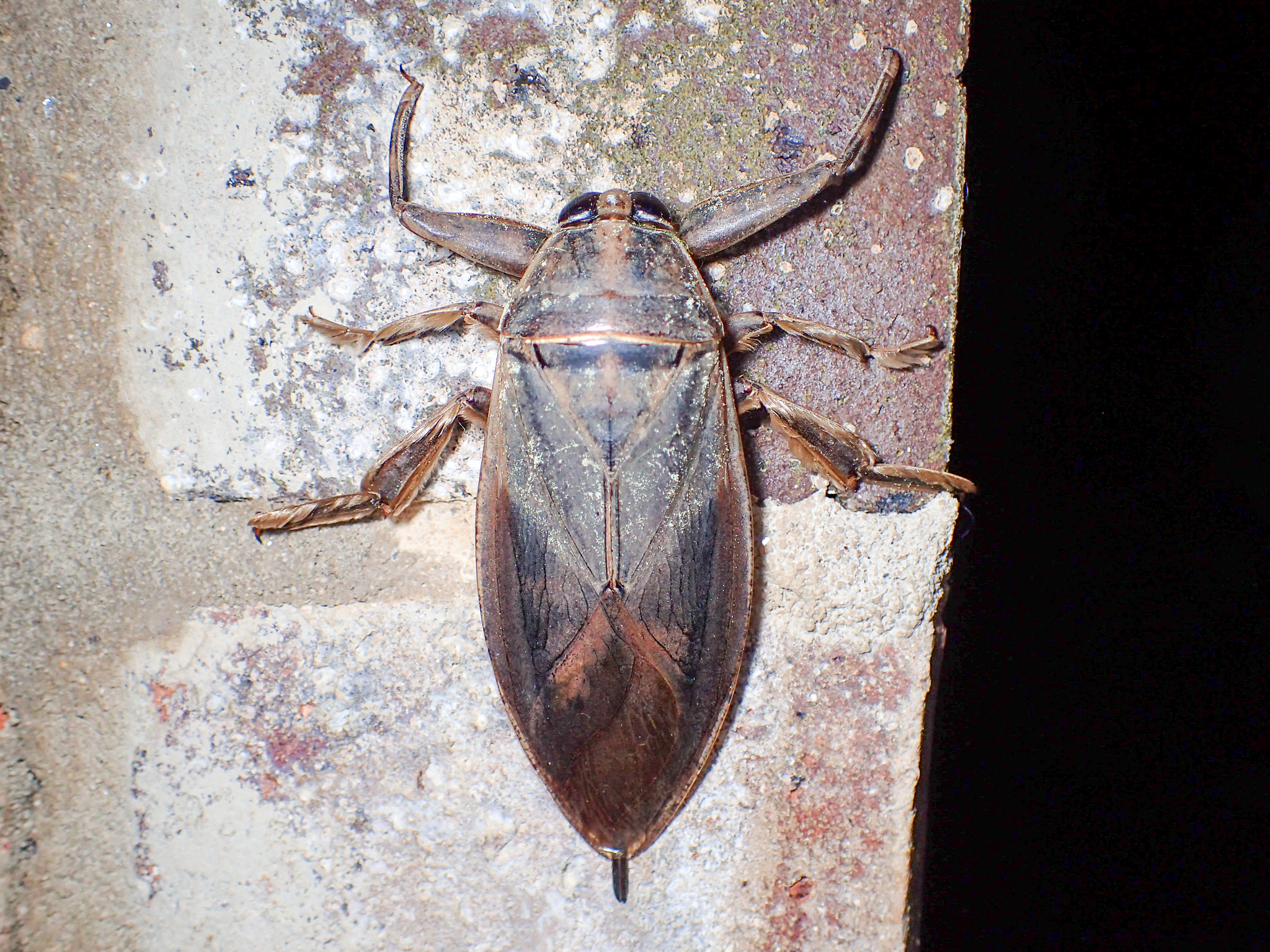

Scientific classification
- Domain: Eukaryota
- Kingdom: Animalia
- Phylum: Arthropoda
- Class: Insecta
- Order: Hemiptera
- Suborder: Heteroptera
- Family: Belostomatidae
- Subfamily: Lethocerinae
- Genus: Benacus
- Species: B. griseus

Binomial name
- Benacus griseus (Say, 1832)

Synonyms
- Lethocerus griseus Say, 1832

= Benacus griseus =

Species of true bug

Benacus griseus is a species of giant water bug in the family Belostomatidae. It is the only species in the genus Benacus, which was formerly considered a subgenus of Lethocerus.

Benacus griseus is found throughout eastern North America, from New England, west through southern Ontario and to Nebraska, south to Florida and Texas, along the Gulf of Mexico coast in Mexico, and into Cuba.

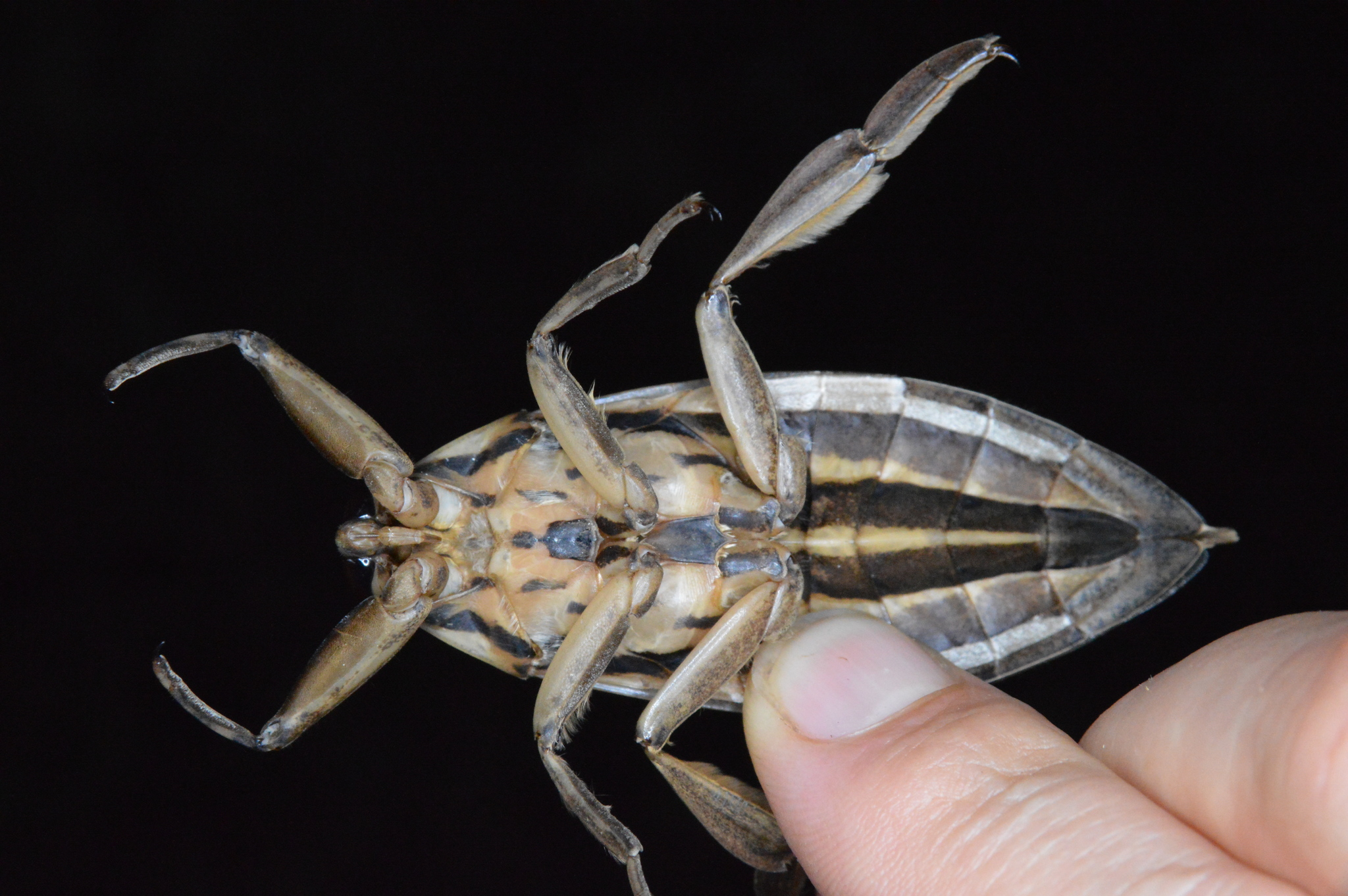
Ventral photo illustrating dark stripes

Adults reach lengths of 47–64 mm, making them one of the largest aquatic insect species found in eastern North America.

It is distinguished from other Lethocerinae species by the lack of a groove on its front femur. It is also characterized by a wide hind tibia and black ventral stripes.
