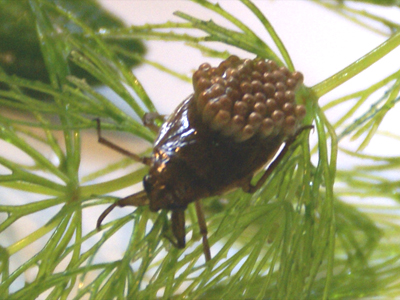
- Male Appasus japonicus with eggs

Scientific classification
- Kingdom: Animalia
- Phylum: Arthropoda
- Clade: Pancrustacea
- Class: Insecta
- Order: Hemiptera
- Suborder: Heteroptera
- Family: Belostomatidae
- Subfamily: Belostomatinae
- Genus: Appasus; Amyot and Serville, 1843

Species
- see text

= Appasus =

Genus of true bugs

Appasus (from Sanskrit: अप्, romanized: ap, lit. 'water' and Sanskrit: पशु, romanized: pashu, lit. 'beast; animal') is a genus of giant water bugs (family Belostomatidae) found in freshwater habitats in Asia and Africa.

Giant water bugs exhibit male parental care. In Appasus and other species in the subfamily Belostomatinae (but not subfamily Lethocerinae), the female glues the eggs onto the male's back, and the male tends them until the eggs hatch.

== Species ==
Partial list of species:

- Appasus ampliatus (Montandon, 1914)
- Appasus capensis Mayr, 1871
- Appasus grassei (Poisson, 1937)
- Appasus japonicus (Vuillefroy, 1864)
- Appasus major (Esaki, 1934)
- Appasus quadrivittatus Bergroth, 1893
- Appasus stappersi (Montandon, 1916)
