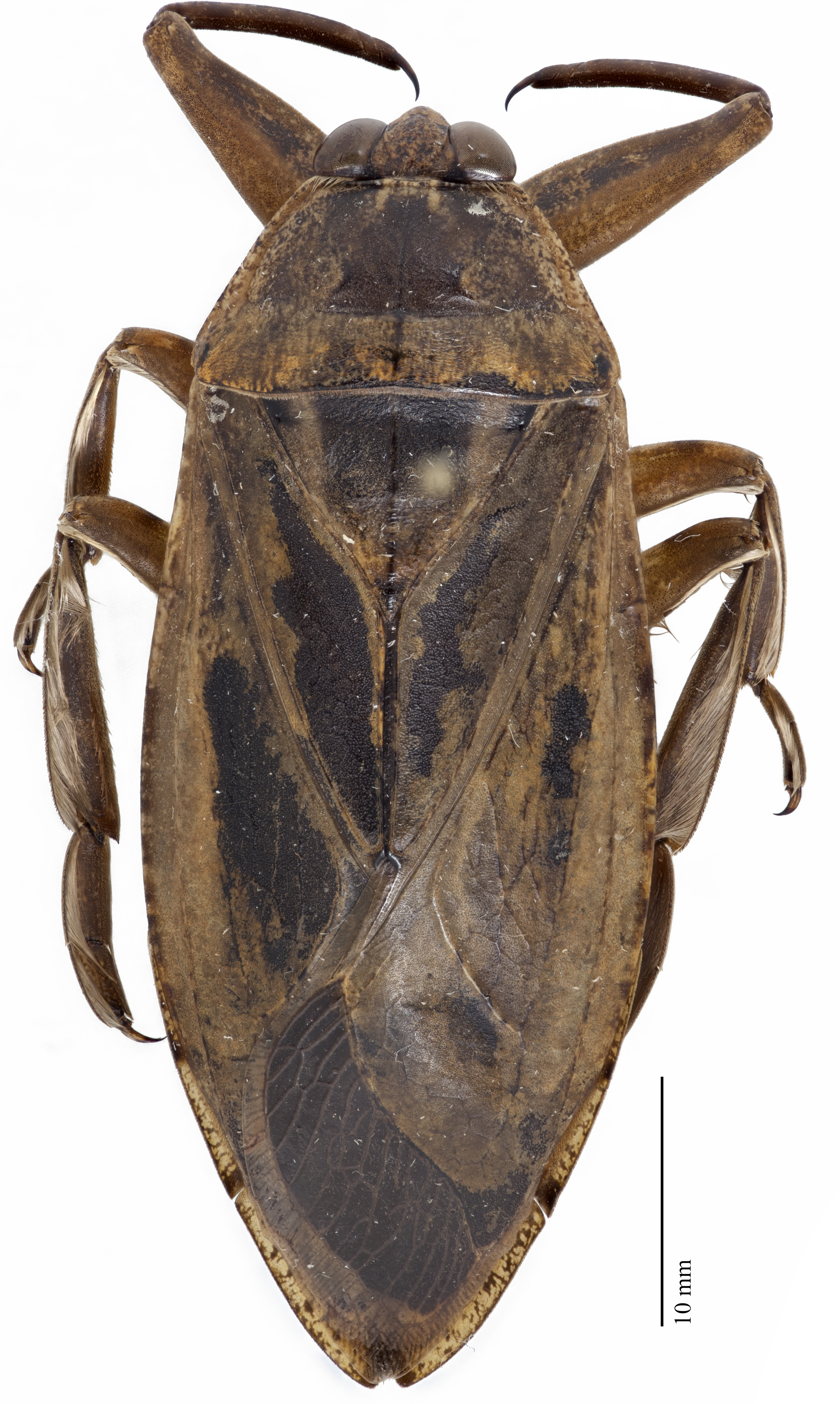
- Lethocerus americanus

Scientific classification
- Domain: Eukaryota
- Kingdom: Animalia
- Phylum: Arthropoda
- Class: Insecta
- Order: Hemiptera
- Suborder: Heteroptera
- Family: Belostomatidae
- Subfamily: Lethocerinae
- Genus: Lethocerus; Mayr, 1853

Species
- See text

= Lethocerus =

Lethocerus Temporal range: Eocene–Present

Genus of true bugs

Lethocerus is a genus of the hemipteran family Belostomatidae, known colloquially as giant water bugs, toe biters and electric light bugs, distributed in tropical, subtropical and temperate areas of the world. The greatest diversity of species occurs in the Americas, with only a single species in Europe, two in Africa, two in Australia and three in Asia. It includes the largest true bugs with species capable of reaching a length of over 12 centimetres (4.7 in). The South American L. grandis and L. maximus are the only species to commonly exceed 9 cm (3.5 in), with more typical lengths for the remaining species being between 4.5 and 9 cm (1.8 and 3.5 in). Lethocerus sp. are distinguished from other genera in the Lethocerinae (Benacus and Kirkaldyia) by two symmetrical furrows in the inner pad of setae on the fore femur, the external borders of parasternites II and III narrowed and nearly straight, and with the setae of the tarsomeres following the line of the tibial setae.

== Habits ==
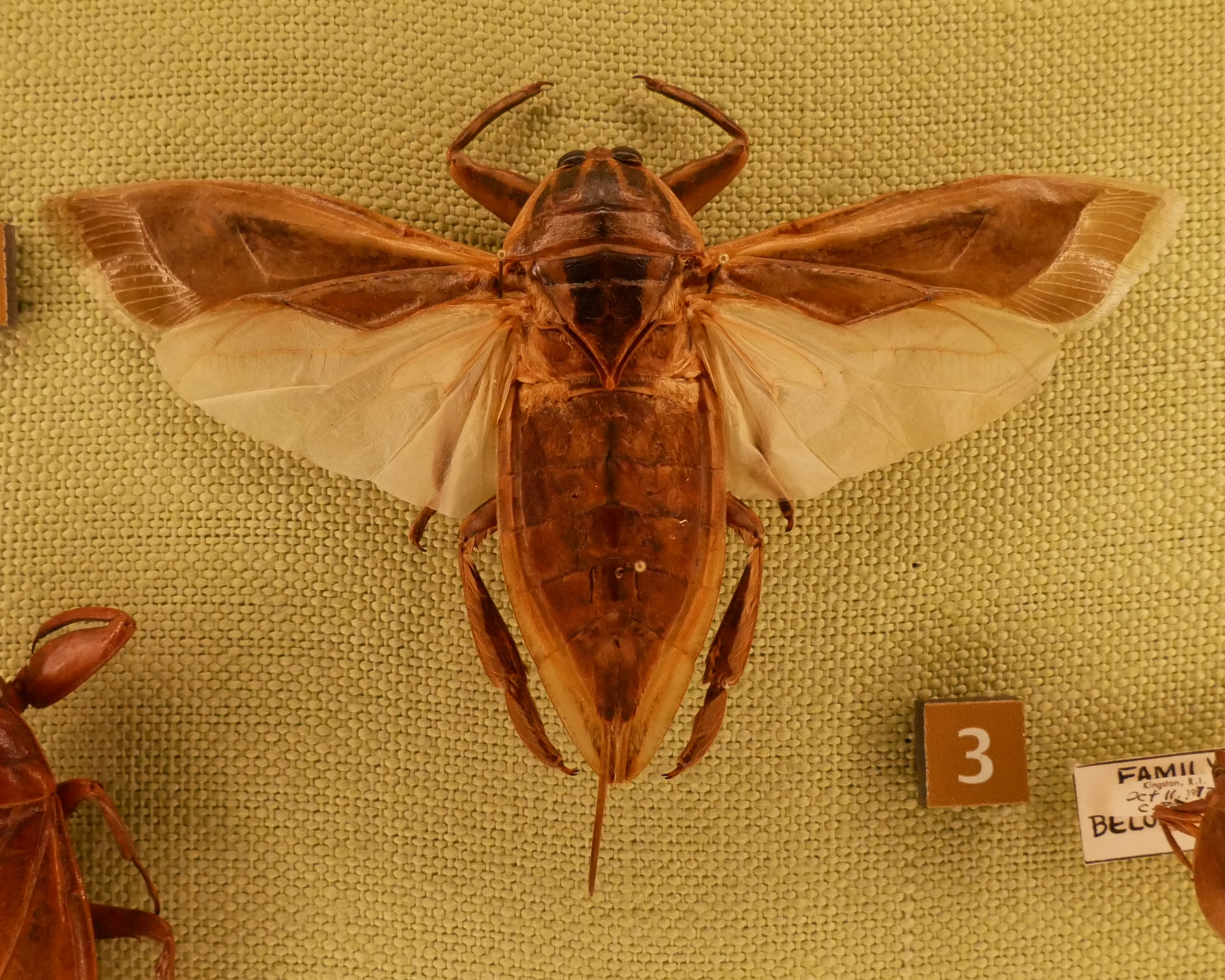
Lethocerus sp. with wings open

Unlike giant water bugs in the subfamily Belostomatinae, females do not lay the eggs on the backs of males. Instead, after copulation (often multiple sessions) the eggs are laid on emergent vegetation (rarely on man-made structures) high enough above the waterline that the eggs will not be permanently submerged. The male then guards the eggs from predators and periodically brings water to the eggs to prevent their desiccation.

Like other members of the giant water bug family, Lethocerus species are predators that overpower prey by stabbing it with the rostrum and injecting a saliva that includes a number of enzymes that break down proteins. As many as 132 components have been found in their saliva or venom, several being similar to those found in assassin bugs. The proboscis is then used to suck the liquified and semi-digested body fluid of the prey. The rostrum can also be used in self-defense, and their sting is very painful to humans, causing swelling and pulsating pain, but usually resolves within about five hours at most.

Lethocerus adults are attracted to lights (hence the name electric light bug) and are attracted in large numbers as they disperse from one water body to another during the rainy season. Some species are eaten, particularly in Southeast Asia and a few are endangered.

== Species ==
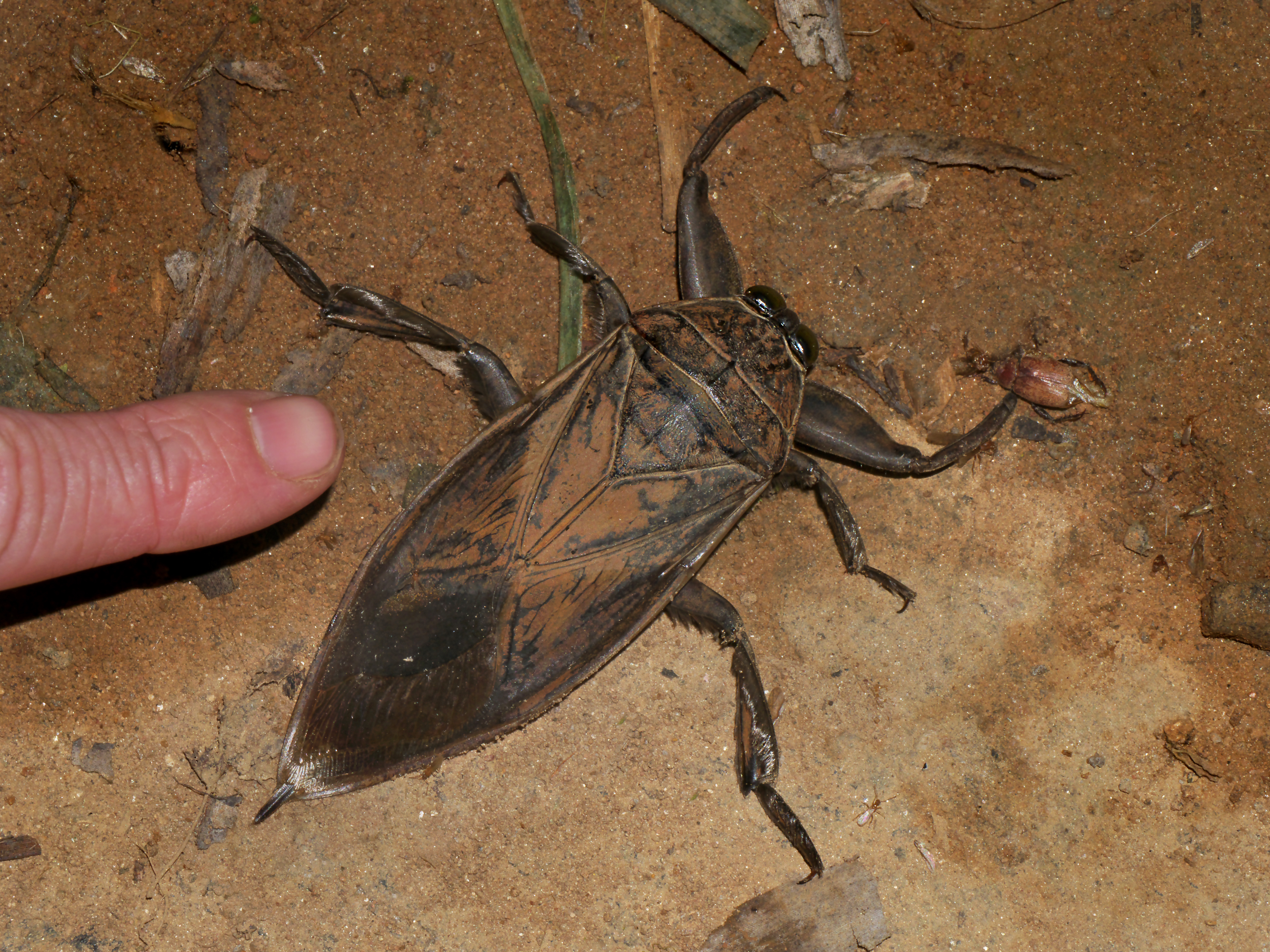
There are two African species, L. oculatus of Madagascar (shown) and L. cordofanus of the mainland

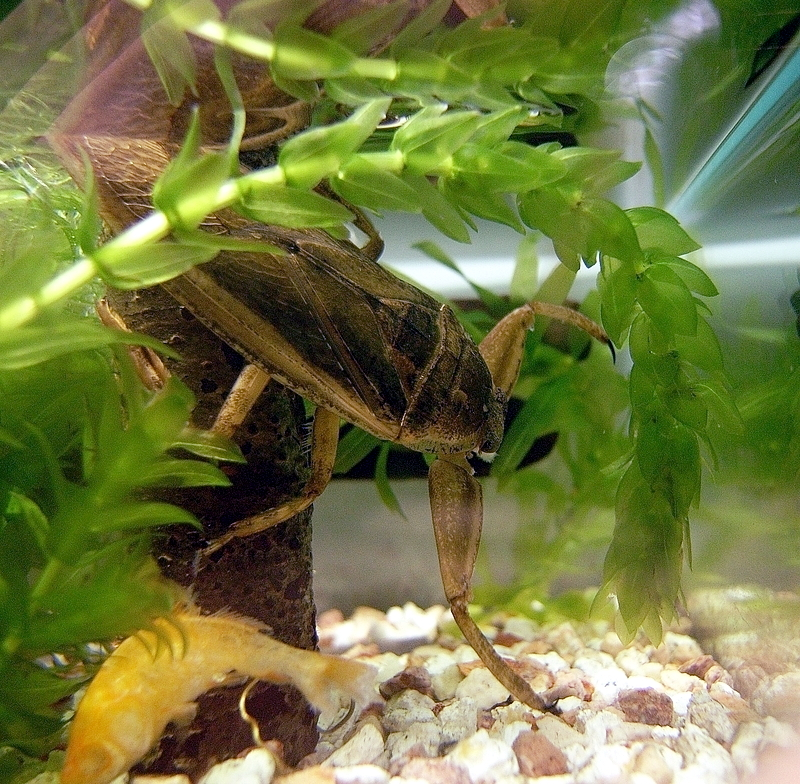
L. deyrollei is now generally placed in its own genus, Kirkaldyia

As of 2006, this is an exhaustive listing of all known species of Lethocerus:

- Lethocerus americanus
- Lethocerus angustipes
- Lethocerus annulipes
- Lethocerus bruchi
- Lethocerus camposi
- Lethocerus collosicus
- Lethocerus cordofanus
- Lethocerus delpontei
- Lethocerus dilatus
- Lethocerus distinctifemur
- Lethocerus grandis
- Lethocerus indicus
- Lethocerus insulanus
- Lethocerus jimenezasuai
- Lethocerus maximus
- Lethocerus mazzai
- Lethocerus medius
- Lethocerus melloleitaoi
- Lethocerus oculatus
- Lethocerus patruelis
- Lethocerus truxali
- Lethocerus uhleri

The oldest known fossil of the genus is an indeterminate species from the Bembridge Marls, Isle of Wight, UK.

In addition to these, Lethocerus deyrollei, which is one of the best known giant water bugs, has traditionally been included in this genus, but in 2006 it was moved to Kirkaldyia.
