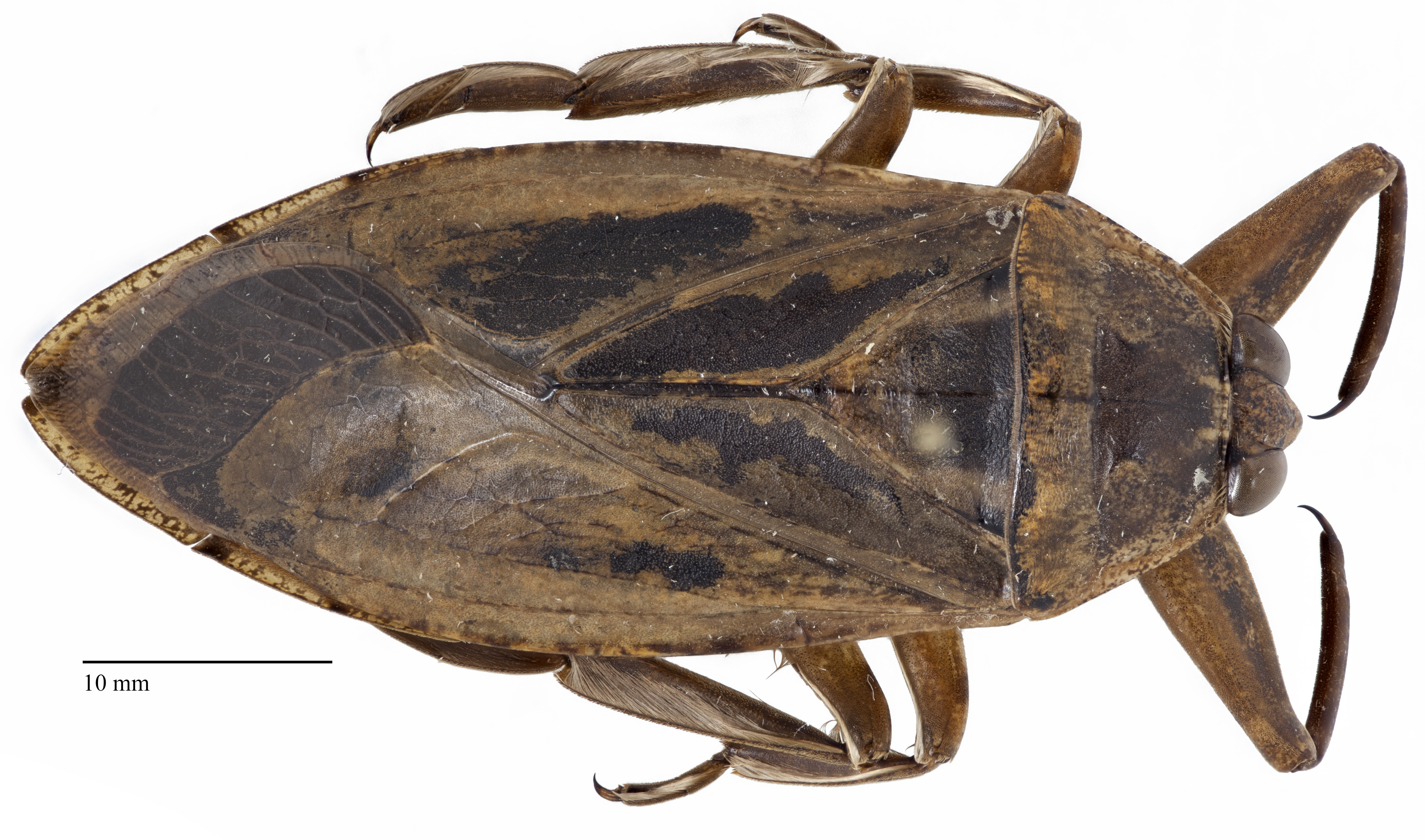

Scientific classification
- Kingdom: Animalia
- Phylum: Arthropoda
- Class: Insecta
- Order: Hemiptera
- Suborder: Heteroptera
- Family: Belostomatidae
- Genus: Lethocerus
- Species: L. americanus

Binomial name
- Lethocerus americanus (Leidy, 1847)

= Lethocerus americanus =

Species of true bug

Lethocerus americanus, sometimes called the electric light bug, toe biter or fish killer, is a giant water bug in the family Belostomatidae, native to southern Canada and the United States (north of 35°N; other Lethocerus species are found southwards). It typically has a length around 5–6 cm (2.0–2.4 in). It was originally classified as a species in the genus Belostoma.

== Habits ==
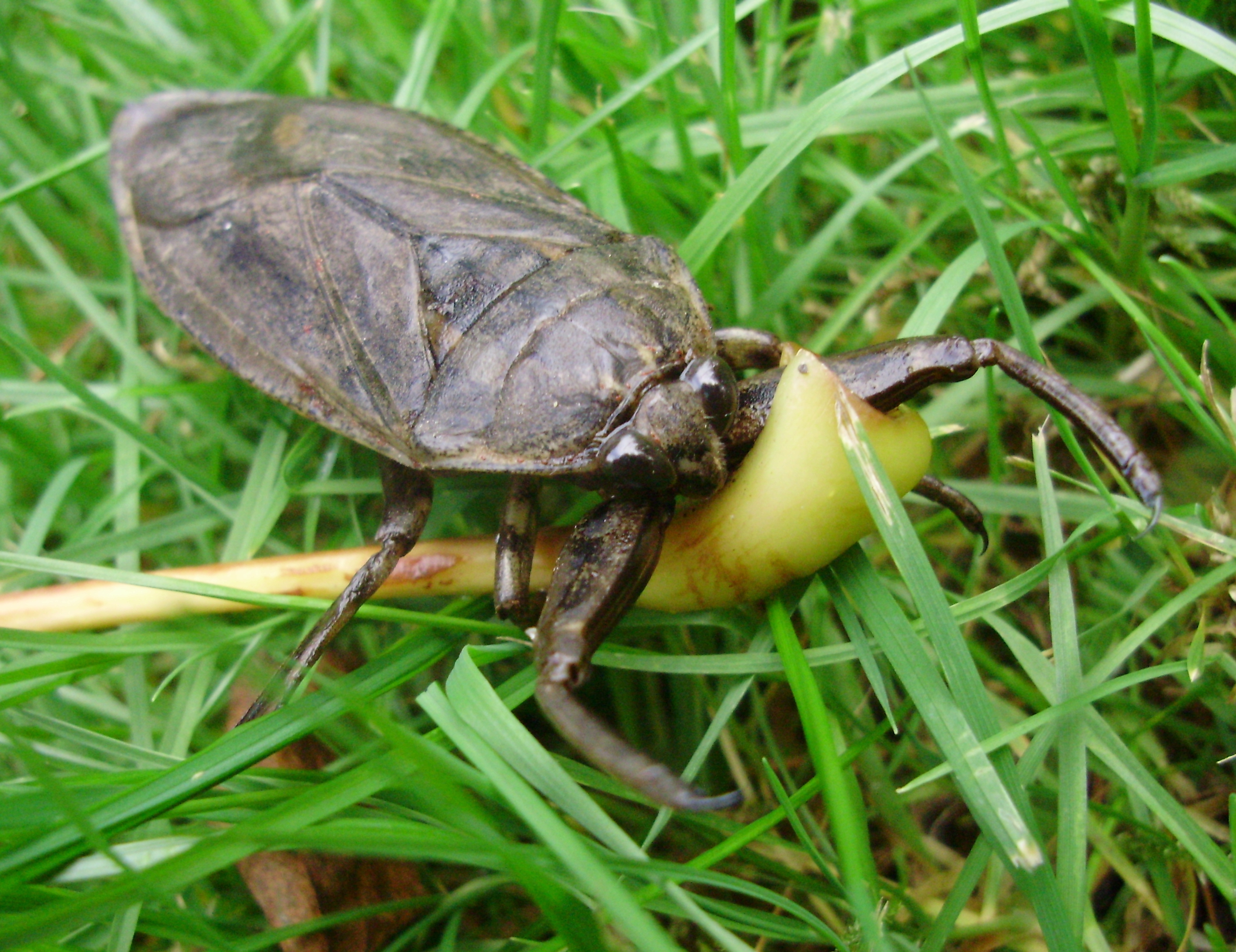
On vegetation

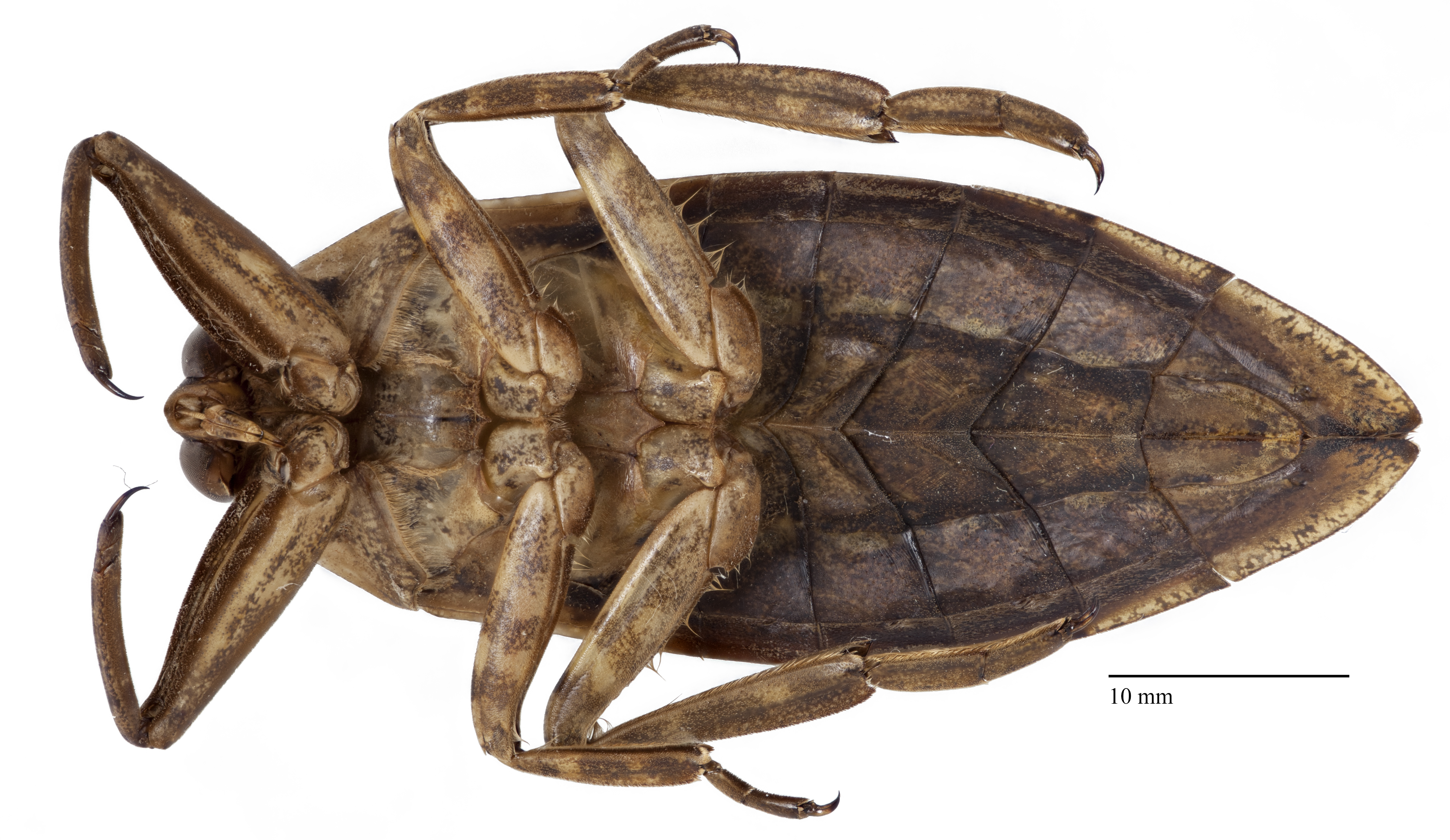
Underside

Commonly found in ponds, marshes, and on the edges of lakes and slow-moving streams and creeks, adults and larvae feed on other insects, small crustaceans (crabs/crayfish), tadpoles/frogs, snails, and small fish. The adult swims with the aid of its hind legs. A pair of front fore limbs is used for capturing and latching onto its intended prey, which it then injects with digestive toxins through a somewhat retractable proboscis much like that of a mosquito. L. americanus tends to let its prey digest for 10–15 minutes before eating. Multiple L. americanus bugs have been seen to hunt and then share the same prey animal. Under water, the adult breathes air that it traps under its wings using two snorkel-like tubes that extend from the rear of its abdomen.

Commonly known as "toe biter", L. americanus may deliver a painful bite if handled or disturbed. However, it prefers to avoid humans rather than engage them whenever possible. If disturbed in the water, the speed of L. americanus allows it to quickly break away while its natural camouflage easily conceals it. Even if agitated on dry land, L. americanus will first attempt to escape or play dead before raising its fore limbs and hind quarters in what resembles a fighting stance. If agitation continues, L. americanus will use its fore limbs to latch onto the source of the agitation and attempt to deliver a painful bite. Also known as the "electric-light bug", it may be attracted by electric lights while flying at night. L. americanus is differentiated from a similar insect, Benacus griseus, by grooves found on its fore femora to accommodate the tibiae when folded tightly; L. americanus is very similar to L. uhleri.

Eggs are laid on vegetation located at the water's edge and may be guarded by an adult. The young nymphs then hatch about two weeks later. Adult females will alternate between feeding and mating, laying about 150 or more eggs in their lifetime. However, few nymphs survive to maturity due to cannibalism and other predators. Adults survive winter by burrowing under mud and leaf matter.
