= Arnold Lucien Montandon =

French entomologist

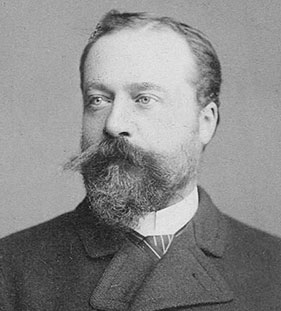
- Born: 26 November 1852; Besançon, France
- Died: 1 March 1922 (aged 69); Cernavodă, Romania
- Scientific career
- Fields: Entomology, Malacology

Arnold Lucien Montandon (1852–1922) was a French entomologist who worked in the Grigore Antipa National Museum of Natural History in Bucharest, Romania. He described over 500 new species or subspecies in more than 100 scientific publications.
