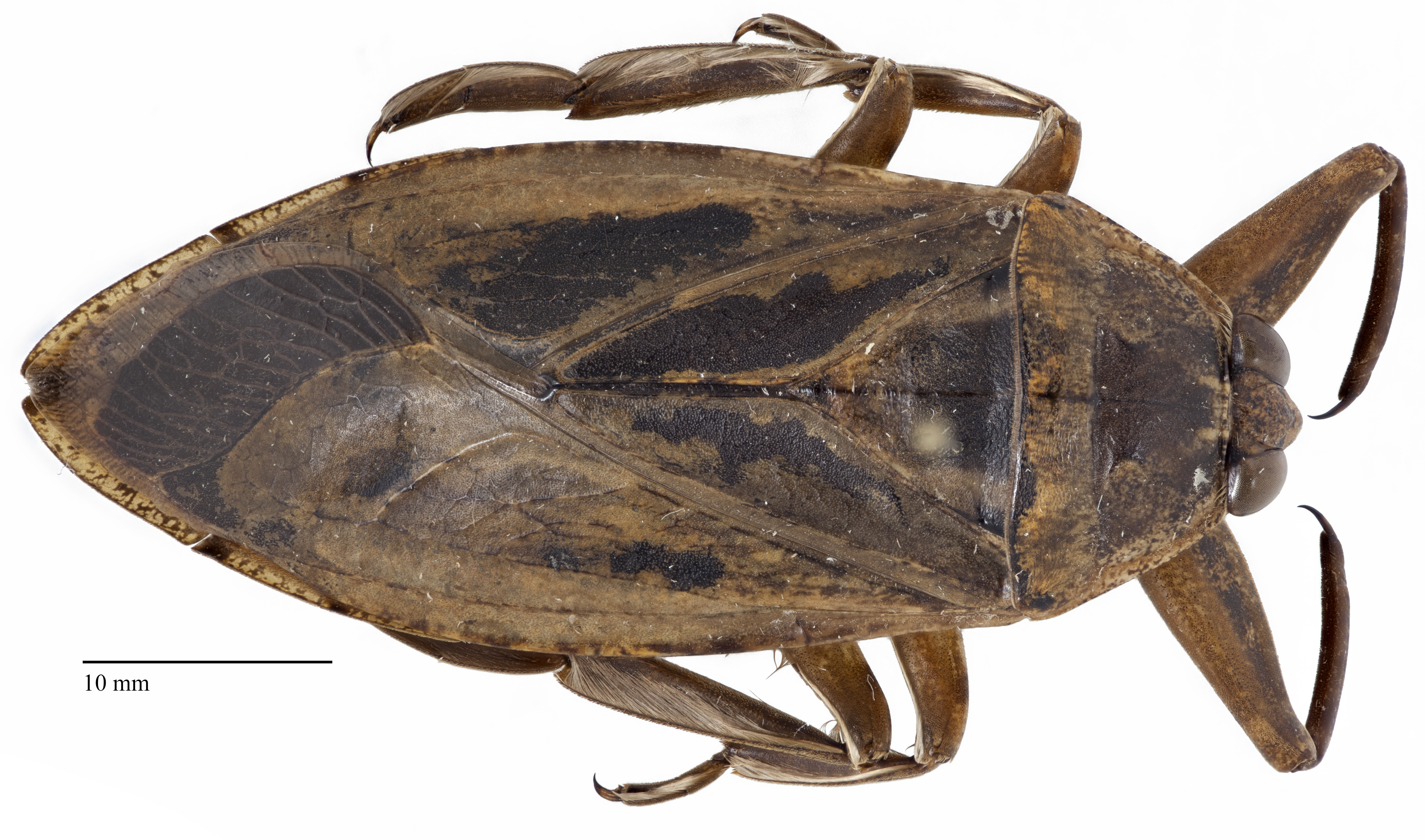
- Lethocerus americanus

Scientific classification
- Kingdom: Animalia
- Phylum: Arthropoda
- Clade: Pancrustacea
- Class: Insecta
- Order: Hemiptera
- Suborder: Heteroptera
- Infraorder: Nepomorpha
- Family: Belostomatidae; Leach, 1815

= Belostomatidae =

Belostomatidae Temporal range: Late Triassic to present

Family of true bugs

Belostomatidae is a family of freshwater hemipteran insects known as giant water bugs or colloquially as toe-biters, Indian toe-biters, electric-light bugs (because they fly to lights in large numbers), alligator ticks, or alligator fleas (in Florida). They are the largest insects in the order Hemiptera. There are about 170 species found in freshwater habitats worldwide, with more than 110 in the Neotropics, more than 20 in Africa, almost as many in the Nearctic, and far fewer elsewhere. These predators are typically encountered in freshwater ponds, marshes and slow-flowing streams. Most species are at least 2 cm (0.8 in) long, although smaller species, down to 0.9 cm (0.35 in), also exist. The largest are members of the genus Lethocerus, which can exceed 12 cm (4.5 in) and nearly reach the length of some of the largest beetles in the world. Giant water bugs are a popular food in parts of Asia.

The oldest fossil member of this family is Triassonepa from the Late Triassic-aged Cow Branch Formation of Virginia and North Carolina, United States.

== Morphology ==
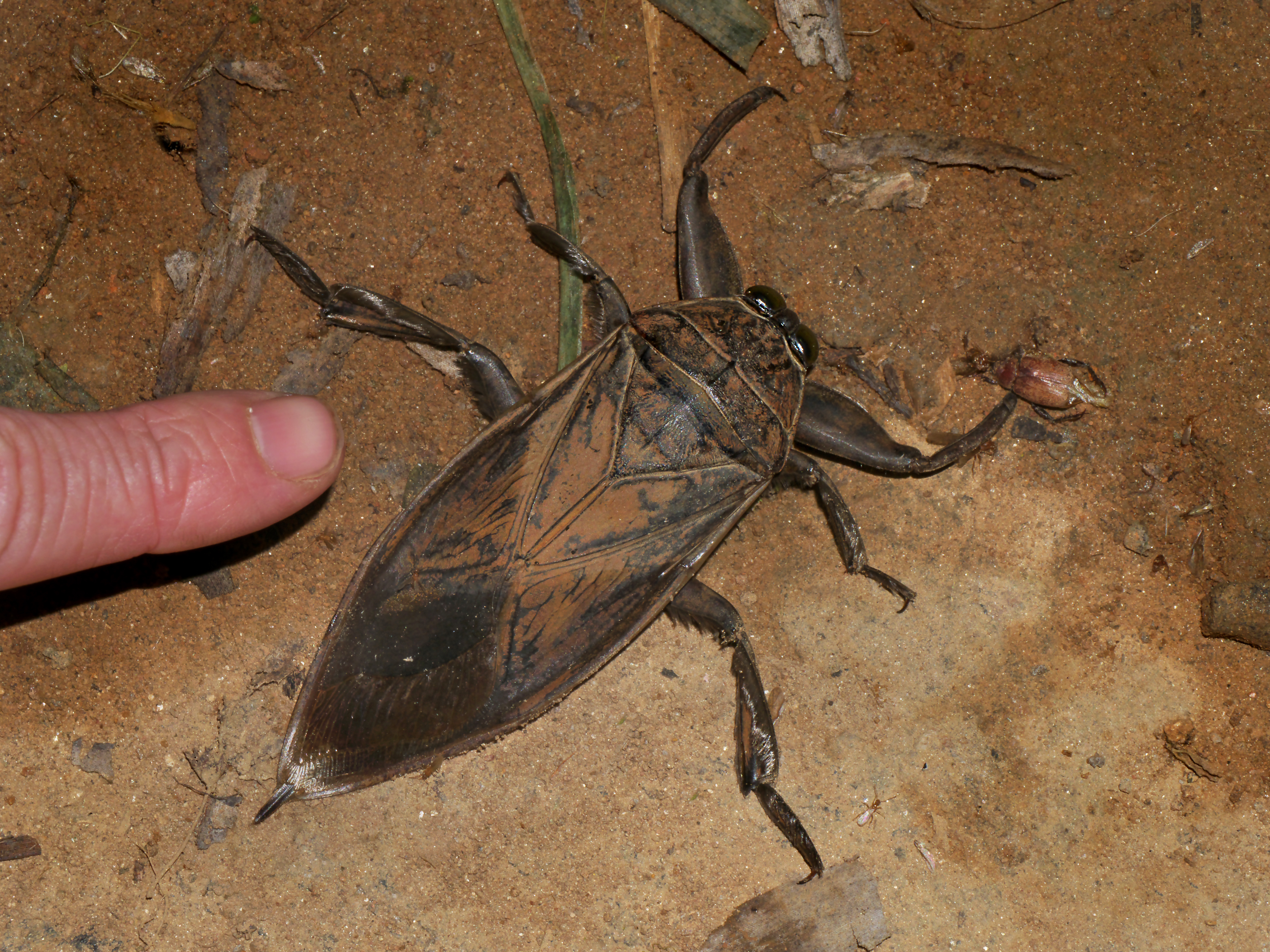
The largest Hemiptera in the world are Lethocerus (L. oculatus shown)

Belostomatids have a flattened, obovoid to ovoid-elongate body, and usually the legs are flattened. The head features two large compound eyes, but lacks ocelli, contrasting with many hemipterans. Short antennae are tucked in grooves behind the eyes. A short breathing tube can be retracted into its abdomen. Adults cannot breathe under water, so must periodically place the breathing tube at the surface for air (similar to a snorkel).

Their hind tarsi have two apical claws. The frontal legs are modified into raptorial appendages that they use to grab their prey, except in the African Limnogeton, which has "normal" forelegs and is a specialized snail-eater. Once caught, the prey are stabbed with their proboscis and a powerful proteolytic saliva is injected, allowing the Belostomatid to suck out the liquefied remains. Wing pads can be seen from the dorsal view. While the members of the subfamily Lethocerinae can disperse by flying, other species, including Abedus herberti, have a greatly reduced flight apparatus and are flightless. Giant Water Bugs exhibit muscle regression as they develop from nymphs to adults, adapting their musculature for a more energy-efficient predatory lifestyle, which may influence their hunting strategies and ecological interactions.

== Subfamilies and genera ==
BioLib lists three extant subfamilies and a number of fossil taxa:

=== Belostomatinae ===
Auth. Leach, 1815

1. Abedus Stål, 1862
2. Appasus Amyot & Serville, 1843
3. Belostoma Latreille, 1807
4. Diplonychus Laporte de Castelnau, 1833 (synonym Sphaerodema Laporte, 1833)
5. Hydrocyrius Spinola, 1850 (synonym Poissonia Brown, 1948)
6. Limnogeton Mayr, 1853
7. Weberiella De Carlo, 1966
- Fossil genera

=== Horvathiniinae ===
Auth. Lauck & Menke, 1961; South America

1. Horvathinia Montandon, 1911

=== Lethocerinae ===
Auth. Lauck & Menke, 1961

1. Benacus Stål, 1861
2. Lethocerus Mayr, 1853 (includes Kirkaldyia Montandon, 1909)

=== Fossil taxa ===
subfamily Stygeonepinae Popov, 1971 †

1. Aenictobelostoma Polhemus, 2000 †
2. Belostomates Schöberlin, 1888 †
3. Lethopterus Popov, 1989 †
4. Manocerus Zhang, 1989 †
5. Scarabaeides Germar, 1839 †
6. Triassonepa Criscione & Grimaldi, 2017 †

== Habits ==
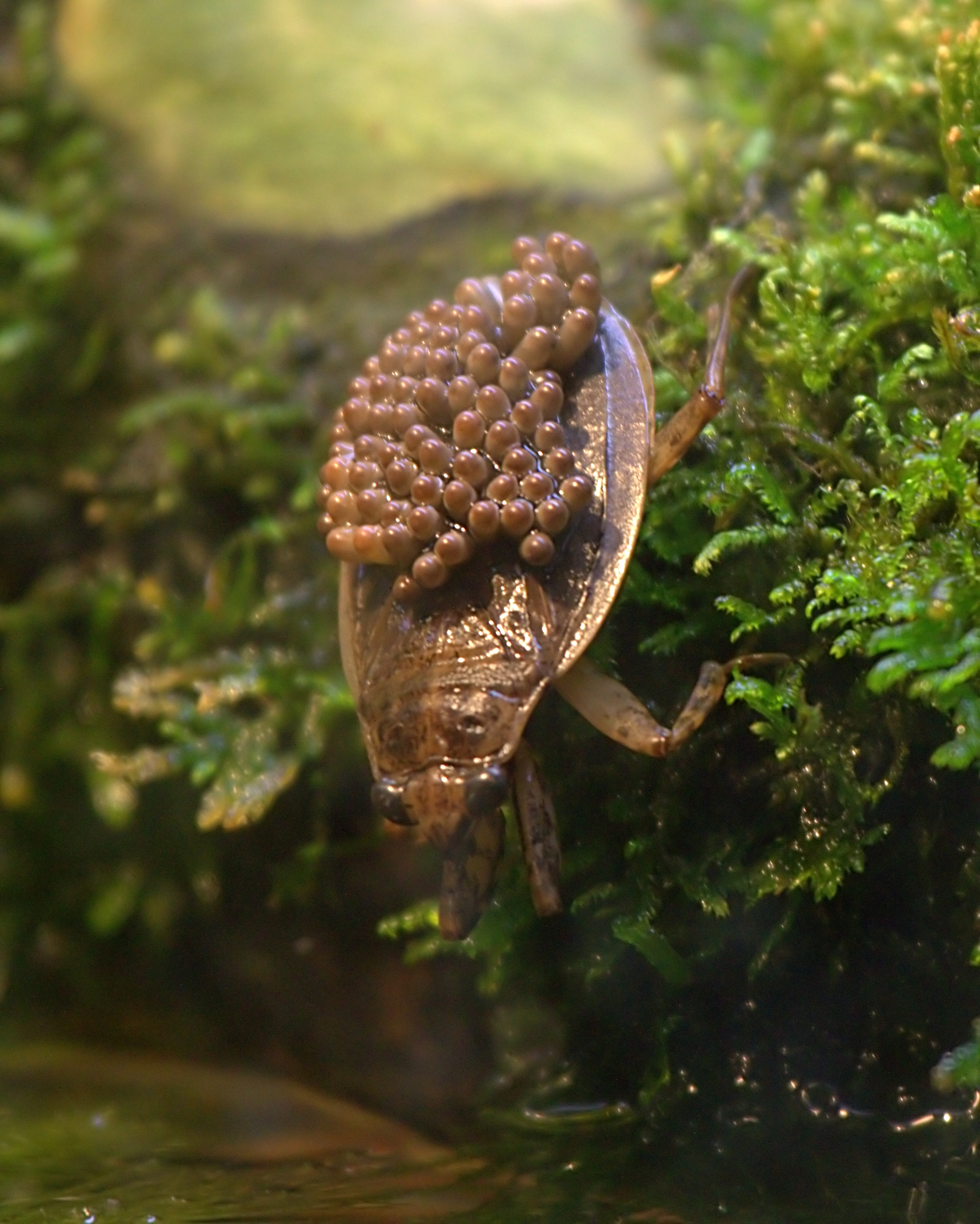
Male Abedus herberti with eggs on his back

=== Feeding and defense ===
Belostomatids are aggressive predators that stalk, capture, and feed on fish, amphibians, as well as aquatic invertebrates such as snails and crustaceans. The largest species have also been found to capture and feed on baby turtles and water snakes. They often lie motionless at the bottom of a body of water, attached to various objects, where they wait for prey to come near. They then strike, injecting a venomous digestive saliva with their rostrum. Although their bite is excruciatingly painful, it is of no medical significance. Occasionally, when encountered by a larger animal or a human, they have been known to "play dead" and most species can emit a fluid from their anus. Due to this, they are assumed dead by humans only to later "come alive" with painful results.

=== Breeding ===
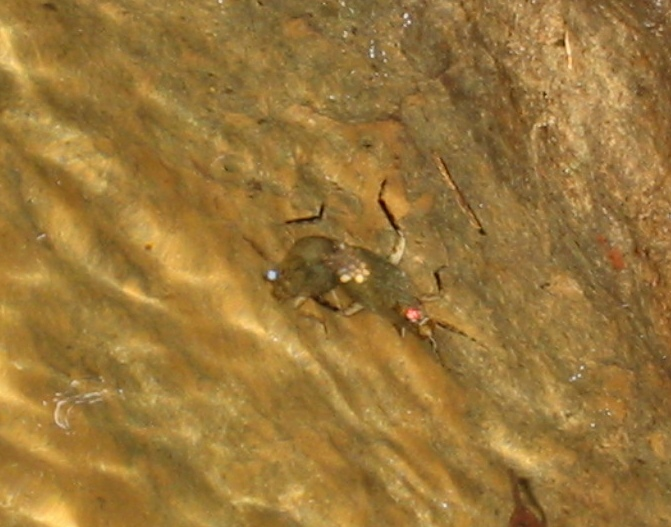
Male (red tag) and female (blue tag) Abedus copulating

Belostomatids show paternal care and these aspects have been studied extensively, among others involving the North American Belostoma flumineum and the East Asian Lethocerus (Kirkaldyia) deyrollei. In species of the subfamily Belostomatinae, the eggs are typically laid on the male's wings and carried until they hatch. The male cannot mate during this period. The males invest considerable time and energy in reproduction and females take the role of actively finding males to mate. This role reversal matches the predictions of R. L. Trivers' parental investment theory. In the subfamily Lethocerinae, the eggs are laid on emergent vegetation and guarded by the male.

== In Asian cuisine ==
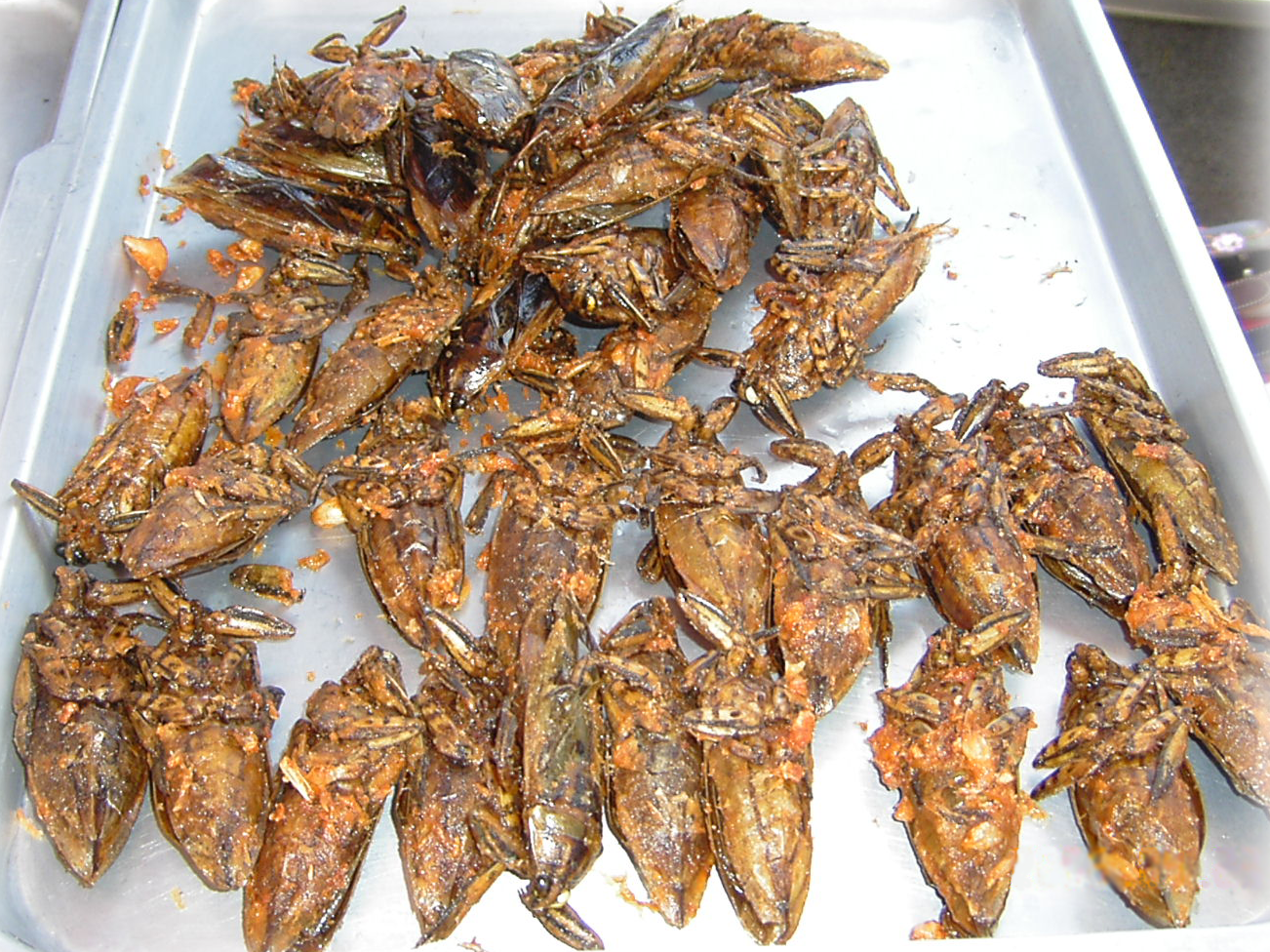
Fried giant water bugs at a market in Thailand

Belostomatids can be found for sale in markets mainly in Southeast Asia involving the species Lethocerus indicus. In Southeast Asia they are often collected for this purpose using large floating traps on ponds, set with black lights to attract the bugs. Adults fly at night, like many aquatic insects, and are attracted to lights during the breeding season.
