= List of Geocoris species =

This is a list of the roughly 150 species in the genus Geocoris, big-eyed bugs.

== Geocoris species ==
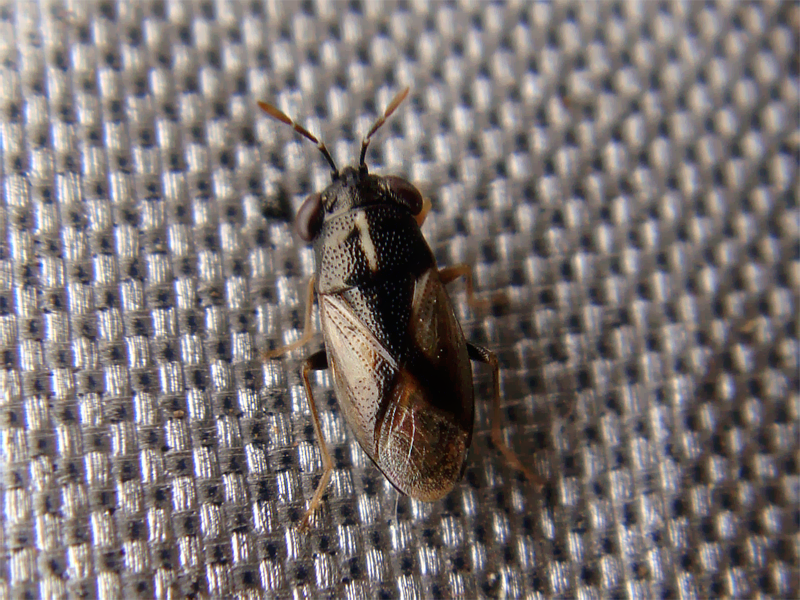
Geocoris albipennis in Pedrógão Grande (Portugal)

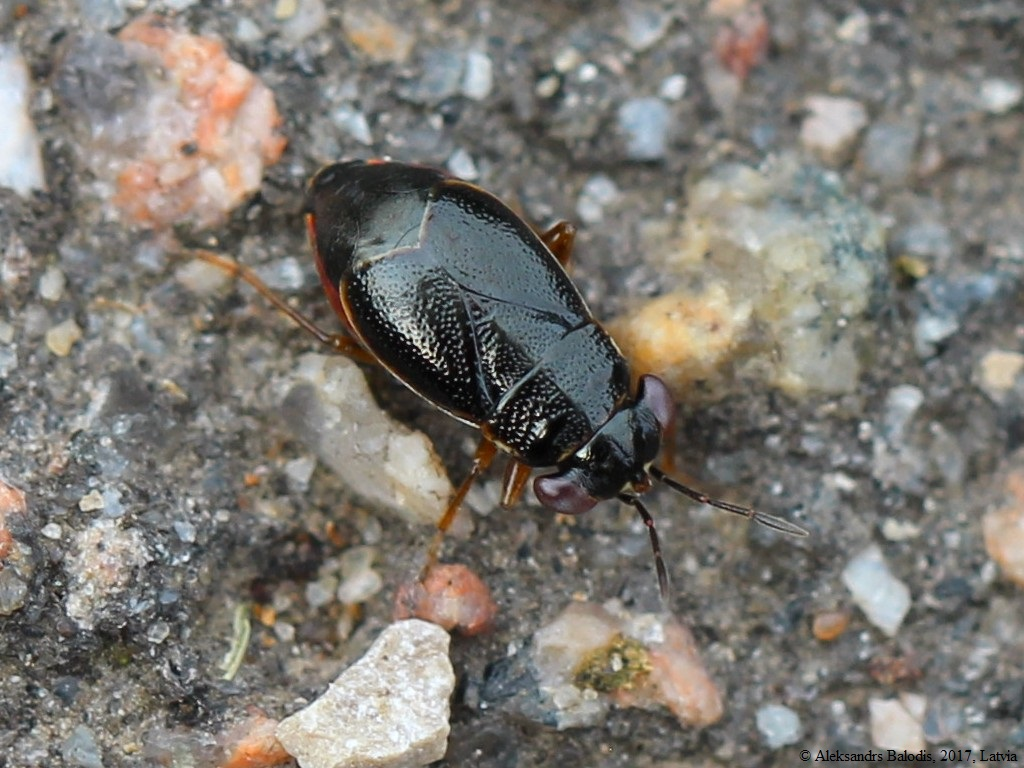
Geocoris dispar in Latvia

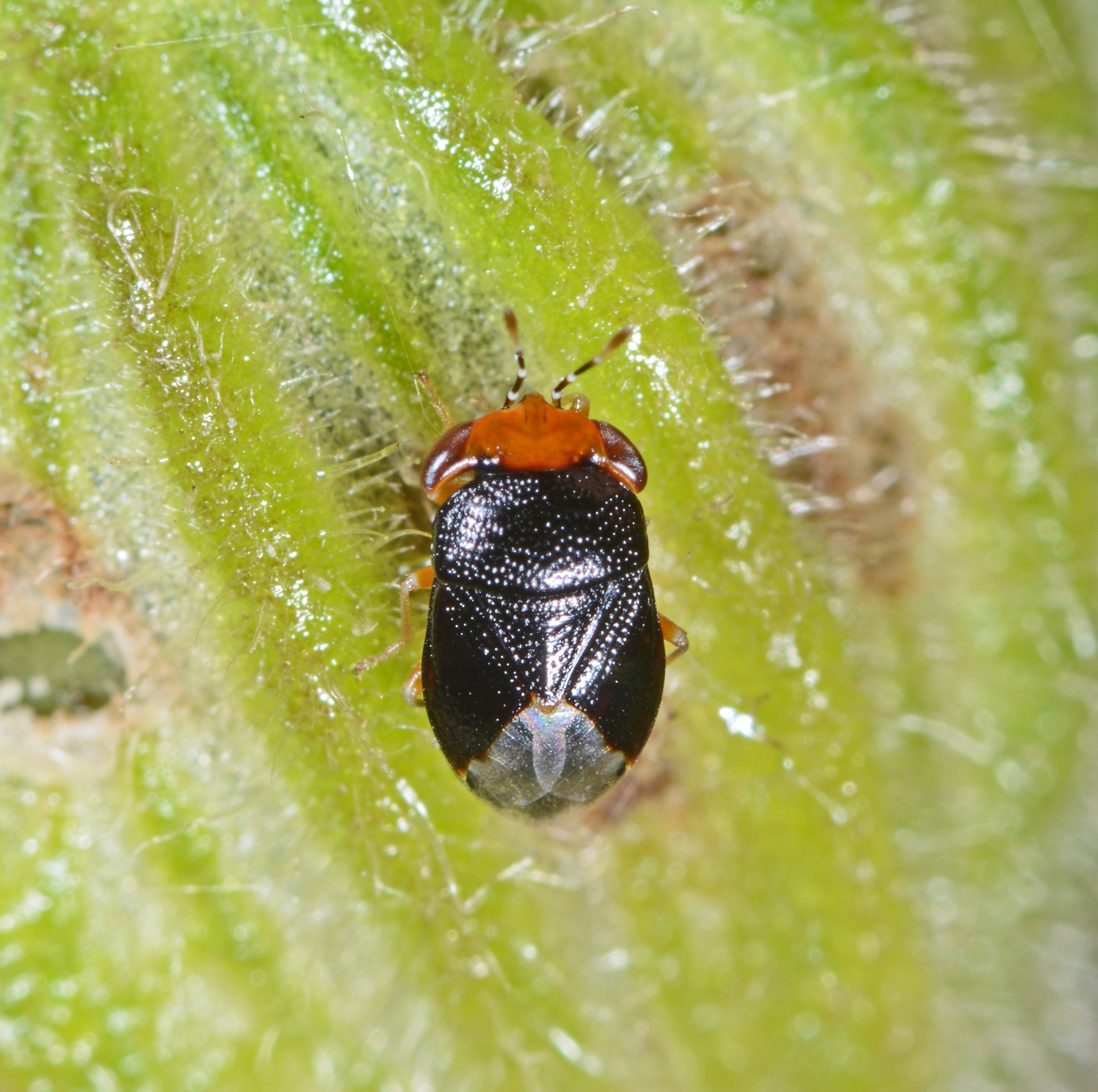
Geocoris erythrocephalus in Fronton (France)

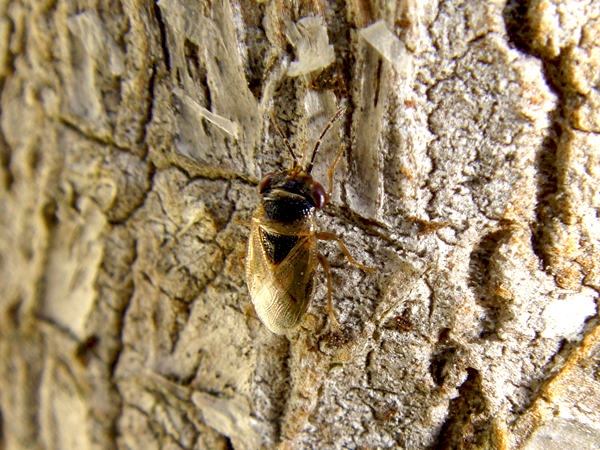
Geocoris megacephalus in Ansião (Portugal)

- Geocoris acuticeps Signoret, 1881^{g}
- Geocoris aethiopicus Montandon, 1913^{g}
- Geocoris aethiops Distant, 1901^{g}
- Geocoris alboclavus Barber, 1949^{i g}
- Geocoris amabilis Stal, 1855^{g}
- Geocoris anticus Pericart, 1994^{g}
- Geocoris apertus Kerzhner, 1979^{g}
- Geocoris arenarius (Jakovlev, 1867)^{g}
- Geocoris asetosus Malipatil, 1994^{g}
- Geocoris aspasia Linnavuori, 1972^{g}
- Geocoris ater (Fabricius, 1787)^{g}
- Geocoris atricolor Montandon, 1908^{i g b}
- Geocoris barberi Readio and Sweet, 1982^{i g}
- Geocoris barrosi Porter, 1917^{g}
- Geocoris beameri Barber, 1935^{i g}
- Geocoris bengalensis Mukhopadhyay & Ghosh, 1982^{g}
- Geocoris borealis Malipatil, 1994^{g}
- Geocoris bullatus (Say, 1832)^{i g b} (large big-eyed bug)
- Geocoris callosulus Berg, 1879^{g}
- Geocoris cardinalis Puton, 1874^{g}
- Geocoris carinatus McAtee, 1914^{i g}
- Geocoris caspiriensis Montandon, 1913^{g}
- Geocoris chinai Kiritshenko, 1931^{g}
- Geocoris chinensis Jakovlev, 1904^{g}
- Geocoris chloroticus Puton, 1888^{g}
- Geocoris collaris Puton, 1878^{g}
- Geocoris confalonierii (de Bergevin, 1932)^{g}
- Geocoris danalicus Linnavuori, 1978^{g}
- Geocoris davisi Barber, 1935^{i g}
- Geocoris decoratus Uhler, 1877^{i g}
- Geocoris deficiens Lethierry, 1881^{g}
- Geocoris desertorum (Jakovlev, 1871)^{g}
- Geocoris discopterus Stal, 1874^{i g b}
- Geocoris dispar (Waga, 1839)^{g}
- Geocoris disparatus Johnson & Fox, 1892^{g}
- Geocoris dubreuili Montandon, 1909^{g}
- Geocoris duzeei Montandon, 1908^{i g}
- Geocoris elegantulus Distant, 1904^{g}
- Geocoris erebus Distant, 1918^{g}
- Geocoris ernstheissi Carapezza, 2006^{g}
- Geocoris erythrocephalus (Lepelitier & Serville, 1825)^{g}
- Geocoris erythrops (Dufour, 1857)^{g}
- Geocoris fedtschenkoi Reuter, 1885^{g}
- Geocoris figuratus (Amyot & Serville, 1843)^{g}
- Geocoris flaviceps (Burmeister, 1834)^{g}
- Geocoris flavilineus Stål, 1874^{i g}
- Geocoris flavipes Stal, 1854^{g}
- Geocoris floridanus Blatchley, 1926^{i g b} (Florida big-eyed bug)
- Geocoris frisoni Barber, 1926^{i g b}
- Geocoris grylloides (Linnaeus, 1761)^{i g}
- Geocoris hirsutus Montandon, 1907^{g}
- Geocoris hirticornis (Jakovlev, 1881)^{g}
- Geocoris hispidulus Puton, 1874^{g}
- Geocoris howardi Montandon, 1908^{i g b}
- Geocoris hui Zheng & Zou, 1987^{g}
- Geocoris hyalinus (Fieber, 1861)^{g}
- Geocoris infernorum Scudder, 1890^{g}
- Geocoris insularis China, 1955^{g}
- Geocoris jucundus (Fieber, 1861)^{g}
- Geocoris junodi Montandon, 1907^{g}
- Geocoris kalighatus Distant, 1910^{g}
- Geocoris lapponicus Zetterstedt, 1838^{g}
- Geocoris leopoldi Schouteden, 1933^{g}
- Geocoris limbatellus Horvath, 1895^{g}
- Geocoris limbatus Stal, 1874^{i g b}
- Geocoris lineola (Rambur, 1839)^{g}
- Geocoris linnavuorii Pericart, 1994^{g}
- Geocoris liolestes Hesse, 1947^{g}
- Geocoris lituratus (Fieber, 1844)^{g}
- Geocoris lividipennis Stål, 1862^{i g}
- Geocoris lubrus Kirkaldy, 1907^{g}
- Geocoris luridus (Fieber, 1844)^{g}
- Geocoris lutulentus Distant, 1918^{g}
- Geocoris lynceus Lindberg, 1924^{g}
- Geocoris maindroni Montandon, 1907^{g}
- Geocoris marduk Linnavuori, 1984^{g}
- Geocoris megacephalus (Rossi, 1790)^{g}
- Geocoris membranaeus (Montrouzier, 1861)^{g}
- Geocoris minusculus Kerzhner & Josifov, 1966^{g}
- Geocoris moderatus Montandon, 1907^{g}
- Geocoris modestus (Fieber, 1861)^{g}
- Geocoris mongolicus Horvath, 1901^{g}
- Geocoris montandoniellus Kiritshenko, 1916^{g}
- Geocoris montanus Zheng & Zou, 1981^{g}
- Geocoris nanus Barber, 1835^{i g}
- Geocoris nebulosus (Montandon, 1907)^{g}
- Geocoris ningal Linnavuori, 1984^{g}
- Geocoris nocturnus Linnavuori, 1978^{g}
- Geocoris ochraceus (Fieber, 1861)^{g}
- Geocoris ochropterus (Fieber, 1844)^{g}
- Geocoris omani Barber, 1935^{i g}
- Geocoris ornatus (Fieber, 1861)^{g}
- Geocoris oschanini (Jakovlev, 1871)^{g}
- Geocoris pallens Stal, 1854^{i b} (western big-eyed bug)
- Geocoris pallidiceps Stal, 1858^{g}
- Geocoris pallidicornis Kerzhner, 1979^{g}
- Geocoris pallidipennis (A. Costa, 1843)^{g}
- Geocoris pallipes Stal, 1859^{g}
- Geocoris pattakumensis Kiritshenko, 1914^{g}
- Geocoris paulus McAtee, 1914^{i g}
- Geocoris pedunculatus (Harris, 1835)^{g}
- Geocoris petofii Kóbor, 2023
- Geocoris phaeopterus (Germar, 1838)
- Geocoris piligerus Linnavuori, 1978^{g}
- Geocoris plagiatus (Fieber, 1844)^{g}
- Geocoris proteus Distant, 1883^{g}
- Geocoris provisus Bergroth, 1895^{g}
- Geocoris pseudolineolus Linnavuori, 1978^{g}
- Geocoris pseudolituratus Mukhopadhyay & Ghosh, 1982^{g}
- Geocoris pubescens (Jakovlev, 1871)^{g}
- Geocoris pulchricornis Linnavuori, 1960^{g}
- Geocoris pulvisculatus Distant, 1904^{g}
- Geocoris punctipes (Say, 1832)^{i g b} (big-eye bug)
- Geocoris puri Distant, 1910^{g}
- Geocoris putonianus (Bergroth, 1892)^{g}
- Geocoris quercicola Linnavuori, 1962^{g}
- Geocoris ruficeps (Germar, 1837)^{g}
- Geocoris rufipennis Distant, 1918^{g}
- Geocoris rutiloides Distant, 1918^{g}
- Geocoris rutilus Distant, 1904^{g}
- Geocoris scitus (Fieber, 1861)^{g}
- Geocoris scudderi Stål, 1874^{i g}
- Geocoris sjostedti Montandon, 1908^{g}
- Geocoris sobrinus (Blanchard, 1852)^{g}
- Geocoris sokotranus Kirkaldy, 1899^{g}
- Geocoris spinolae (Montrouzier, 1865)^{g}
- Geocoris stellatus (Montandon, 1907)^{g}
- Geocoris striolus (Fieber, 1861)^{g}
- Geocoris succineus Royer, 1923^{g}
- Geocoris superbus (Montandon, 1907)^{g}
- Geocoris tenuatus Hesse, 1925^{g}
- Geocoris thoracicus (Fieber, 1861)^{i g}
- Geocoris titan Linnavouri, 1986^{g}
- Geocoris toposa Linnavuori, 1978^{g}
- Geocoris uliginosus (Say, 1832)^{i g b}
- Geocoris unicolor (Eckerlein & Wagner, 1965)^{g}
- Geocoris variabilis Jakovlev, 1890^{g}
- Geocoris varipes Distant, 1918^{g}
- Geocoris varius (Uhler, 1860)^{g}
- Geocoris ventralis (Fieber, 1861)^{g}
- Geocoris vestitulus Schouteden, 1957^{g}
- Geocoris vestitus Distant, 1901^{g}
- Geocoris victoriensis Malipatil, 1994^{g}
- Geocoris walkeri Lethierry & Severin, 1894^{g}
- Geocoris willeyi Kirkaldy, 1905^{g}
- Geocoris woodwardi Malipatil, 1994^{g}

Data sources: i = ITIS, c = Catalogue of Life, g = GBIF, b = Bugguide.net
