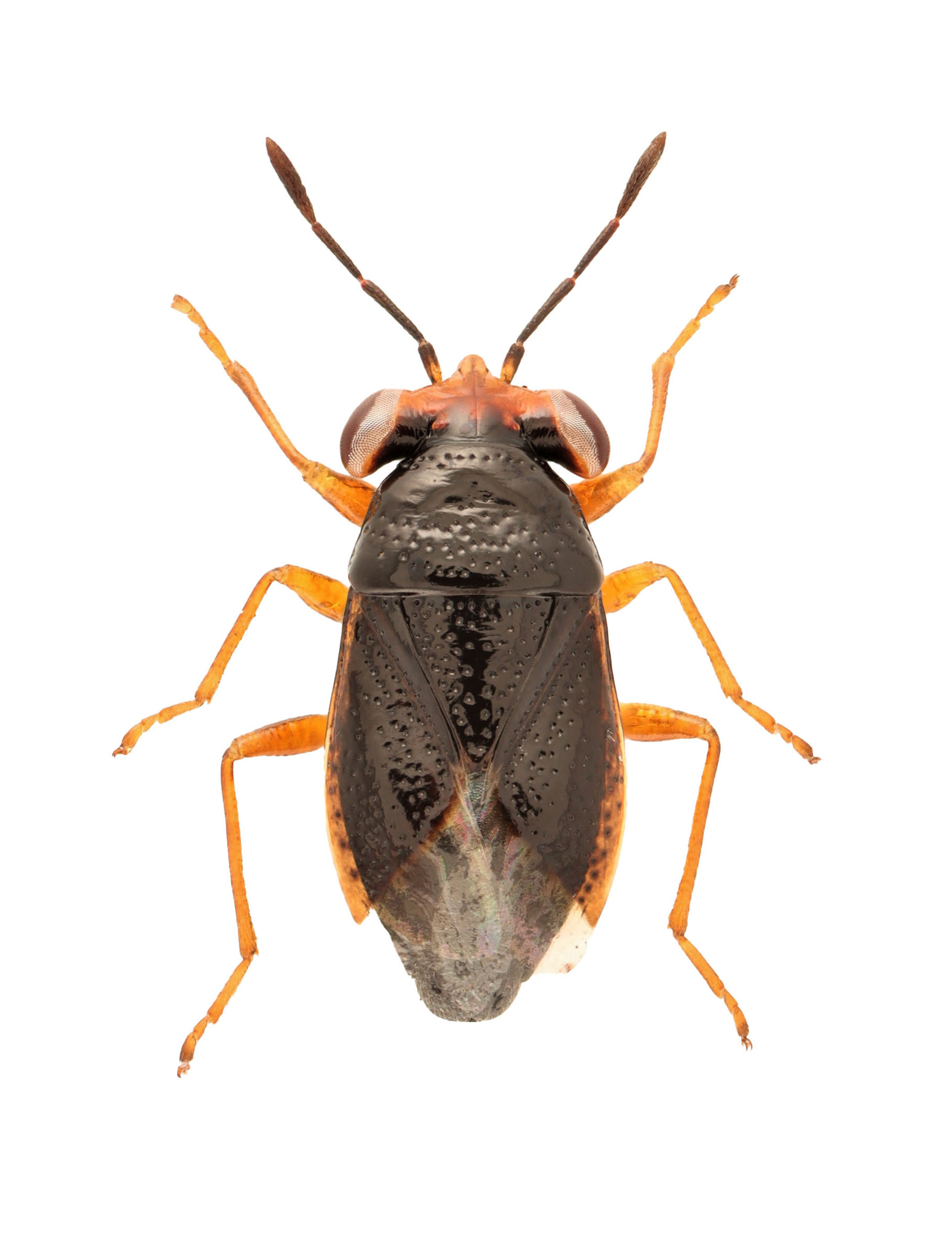

Scientific classification
- Domain: Eukaryota
- Kingdom: Animalia
- Phylum: Arthropoda
- Class: Insecta
- Order: Hemiptera
- Suborder: Heteroptera
- Family: Geocoridae
- Genus: Isthmocoris
- Species: I. piceus

Binomial name
- Isthmocoris piceus (Say, 1832)

Synonyms
- Salda picea Say, 1832

= Isthmocoris piceus =

Species of true bug

Isthmocoris piceus is a species of big-eyed bug in the family Geocoridae. It is found in North America.
