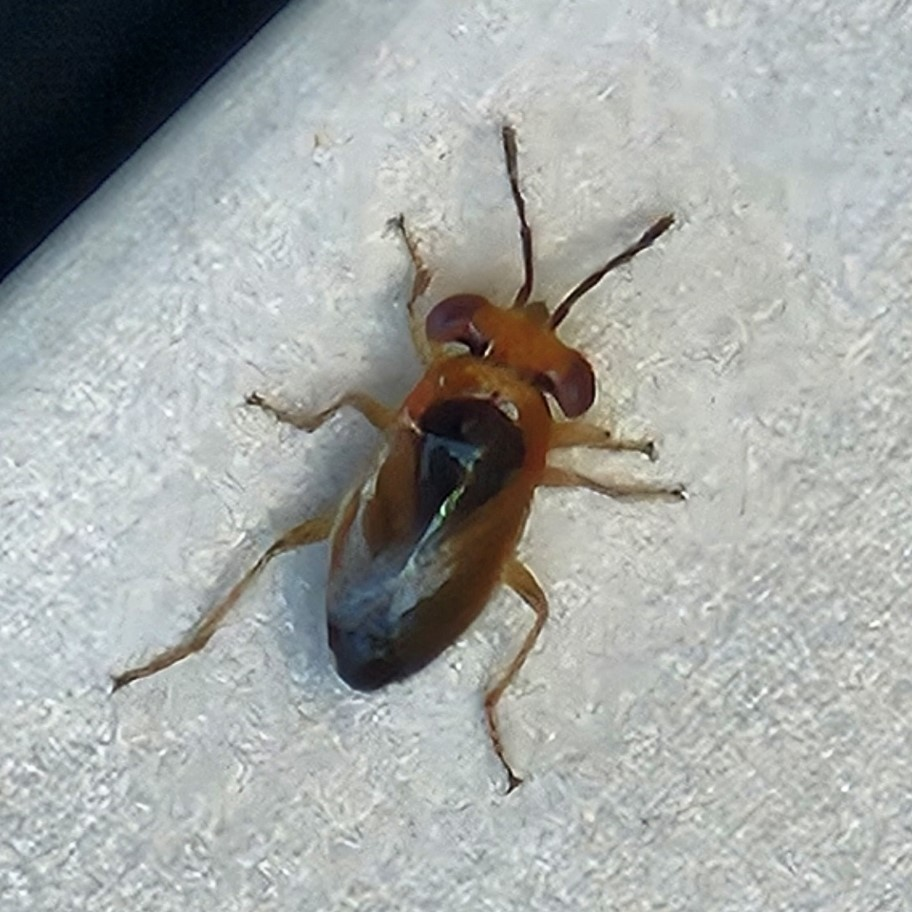

Scientific classification
- Kingdom: Animalia
- Phylum: Arthropoda
- Class: Insecta
- Order: Hemiptera
- Suborder: Heteroptera
- Family: Geocoridae
- Genus: Isthmocoris
- Species: I. imperialis

Binomial name
- Isthmocoris imperialis (Distant, 1882)

= Isthmocoris imperialis =

Species of true bug

Isthmocoris imperialis is a species of big-eyed bug in the family Geocoridae. It is found in Central America and North America.
