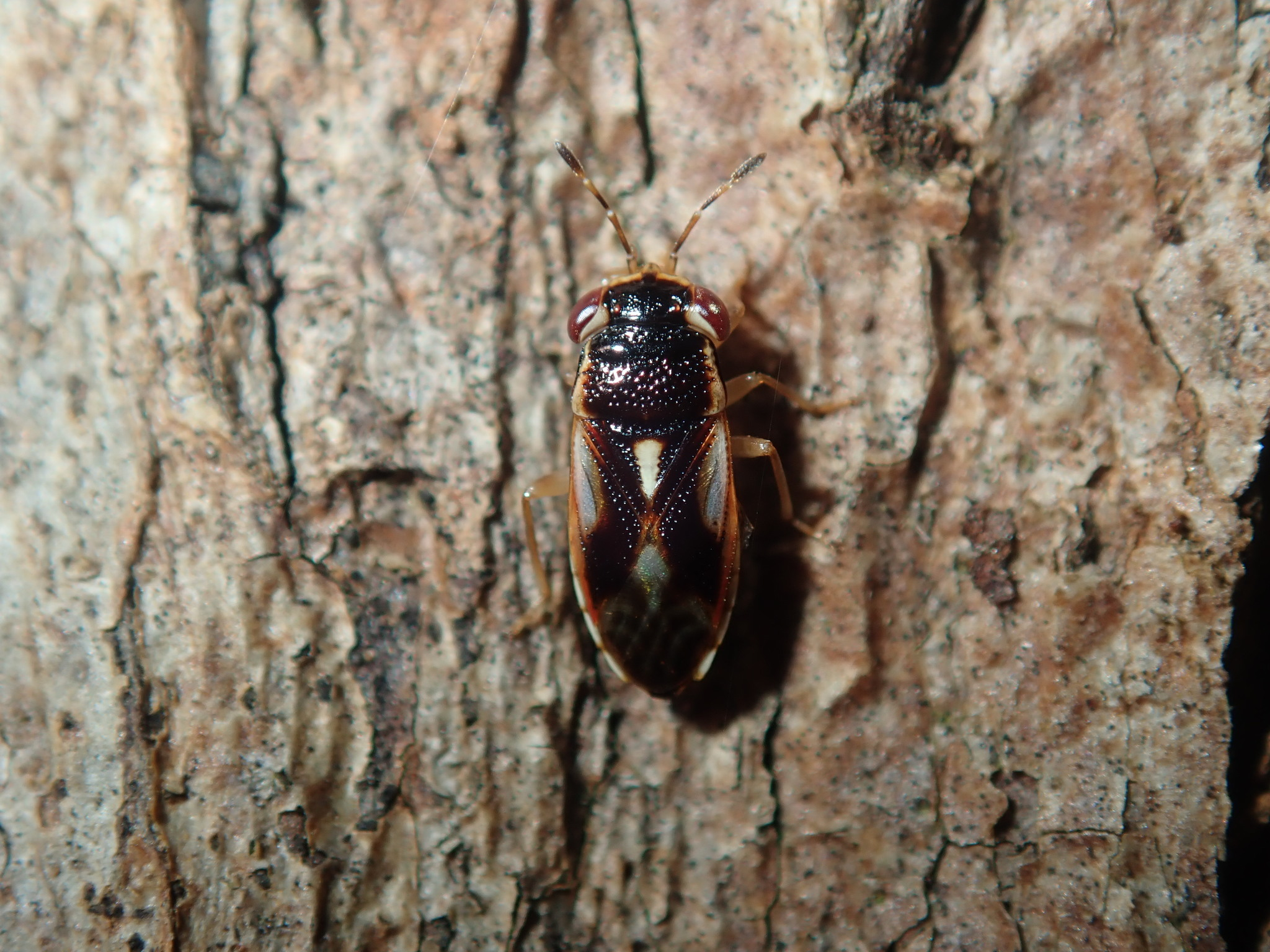

Scientific classification
- Domain: Eukaryota
- Kingdom: Animalia
- Phylum: Arthropoda
- Class: Insecta
- Order: Hemiptera
- Suborder: Heteroptera
- Family: Geocoridae
- Genus: Stylogeocoris
- Species: S. elongatus

Binomial name
- Stylogeocoris elongatus Distant 1901

= Stylogeocoris elongatus =

Species of insect

Stylogeocoris elongatus is a species in the family Geocoridae. First described by William Lucas Distant in 1901. It occurs in most states of Australia
