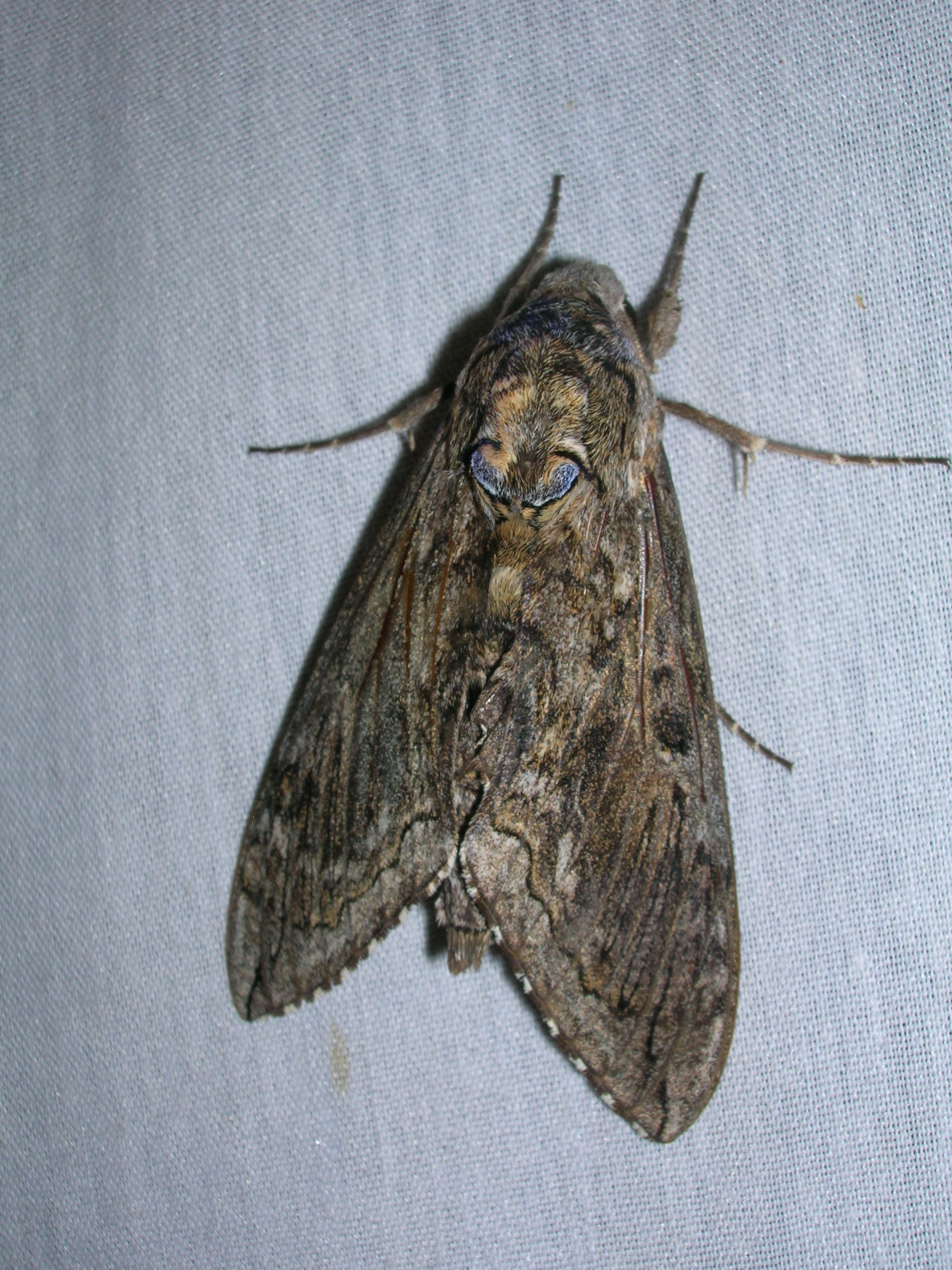

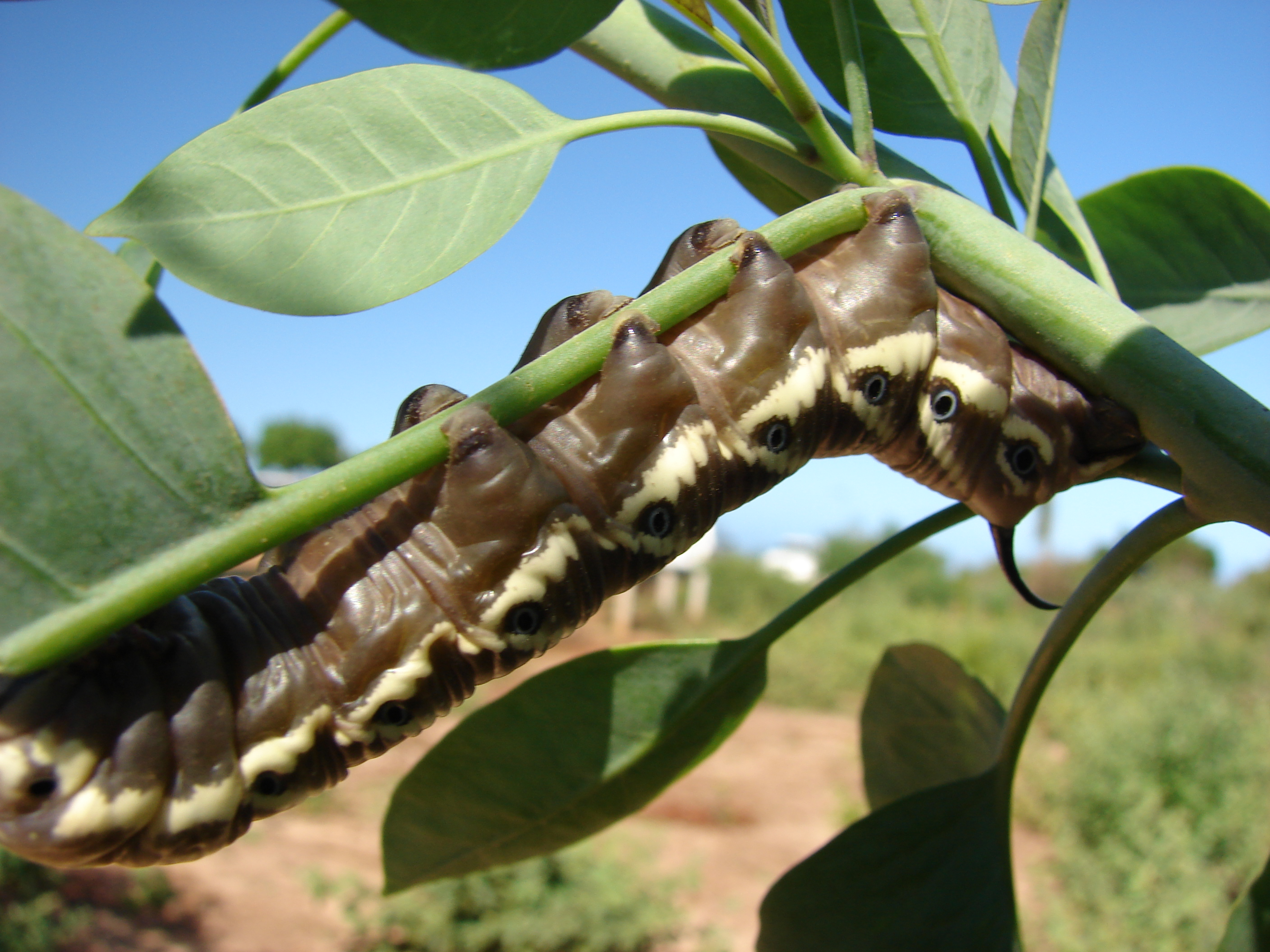

Conservation status
- Critically Imperiled (NatureServe)

- Endangered (ESA)

Scientific classification
- Kingdom: Animalia
- Phylum: Arthropoda
- Clade: Pancrustacea
- Class: Insecta
- Order: Lepidoptera
- Family: Sphingidae
- Genus: Manduca
- Species: M. blackburni

Binomial name
- Manduca blackburni (Butler, 1880)

Synonyms
- Protoparce blackburni Butler, 1880; Phlegethontius blackburnii; Protoparce quinquemaculatus blackburni

= Manduca blackburni =

Species of moth

Manduca blackburni, commonly known as the Hawaiian tomato hornworm, Hawaiian tobacco hornworm, or Blackburn's sphinx moth, is a moth in the family Sphingidae. This rare moth is found in isolated locations on East Maui, Kaho'olawe, and Hawaii.

== Taxonomy ==
Manduca blackburni is the largest insect native to Hawaii and was first described in 1880 by Arthur Gardiner Butler. This rare moth was recorded only a few times from 1940 to 1970 and was considered extinct after a failed attempt to locate the moth conducted by the Bishop museum. However, in 1986, the sphinx moth was found in isolated locations on East Maui, Kaho'olawe, and Hawaii.

The sphinx moth belongs to the family Sphingidae and is characterized by long, narrow forewings and a thick, spindle shaped body. This moth also belongs to the genus, Manduca, and is the most isolated individual within the 70 species in the genus. The tomato hornworm (M. quinquemaculata), also known as the five-spotted hawkmoth, is physically similar to the closely related Blackburn's Sphinx moth.

== Morphology ==
The Blackburn's Sphinx moth is characterized by a thick, spindle-shaped body that typically has five orange spots on each side of the abdomen. The moth has long, narrow forewings that are brown in color with black bands that run across the top margins of the hindwings. The larva can grow to around 3.5-4 inches and can be one of two color morphs; one with a bright green body and the other with a grey body. Both larval morphs have scattered white speckles along the back and a horizontal white stripe on each segment of the body.

== Life History ==
Sphingid moths can develop in as little as 56 days, with four life stages that are observable as the moth grows from an egg into an adult. The first life stage is the egg; an ovoid light green shell that turns pale beige as the larva develops. A pronounced caudal horn is visible roughly 24 hours before the egg hatches, signifying that the second life stage is about to occur; the larva. The larva spends most of its time actively feeding on leaf tissue of the host plants. The third life stage begins when the larva becomes a pupa, which may remain in a state of torpor within the soil for up to a year. The fourth life stage is when the pupa becomes an adult. The fully matured moth emerges from the ground and females lay eggs, starting the life cycle for the next generation.

=== Diet and ecology ===
Larvae feed on plants in the nightshade family, Solanaceae, especially native ʻaiea (Nothocestrum spp.), but also non-native tomatoes (Solanum lycopersicum), tobacco (Nicotiana tabacum), tree tobacco (N. glauca), jimson weed (Datura stramonium), and eggplant (Solanum melongena). The adult feeds on nectar from native plants such as koali ʻawa (Ipomoea indica) and maiapilo (Capparis sandwichiana). Adults may also feed on flowers of the native caper (Capparis spinosa) and wild leadwort (Plumbago zeylanica).

=== Distribution and habitat ===
Manduca blackburni is endemic to Hawaii and was previously known to reside on all of the main islands. This rare moth is now limited to Maui, the Big Island, and Kahoʻolawe after 82% of the moth's habitat was lost. It is found in coastal mesic and dry forests at elevations from sea level to 5,000 ft (1,500 m).

== Conservation ==
It was listed as an endangered species by the United States Fish and Wildlife Service in 2000, making it the first Hawaiian insect to receive such a status. NatureServe considers the insect to be Critically Imperiled. Threats such as invasive predators may account for high mortality rates across the pre-pupal life stages. Parasitism may also account for the high mortality rate and Trichogramma pretiosum is considered the main parasite found within adult individuals. The moth can suffer high levels of mortality during the pre-adult life stages, leading to the overall decline of population sizes.

=== Invasive species ===
Manduca blackburni has predators that are invasive to Hawaii. The following species are known to predate on the eggs; Geocoris pallens, Orius persequens, Miridae, juvenile Reduviidae, larval Coccinellidae, and Chrysopidae have led to an overall decline in pre-pupal population sizes. Manduca blackburni is not known to co-evolve with invasive species, leading to high mortality rates over their life span.

=== Habitat loss ===
Habitat loss in the forms of degradation from farming, human development, and natural disasters has reduced the habitat availability for the Manduca blackburni. Habitat loss is also caused by damage to vegetation by grazing animals such as goats and cows. Climate change also impacts the moth's habitat due to an increase in rainfall which is determinantal to the moth since it inhabits a dry climate.
