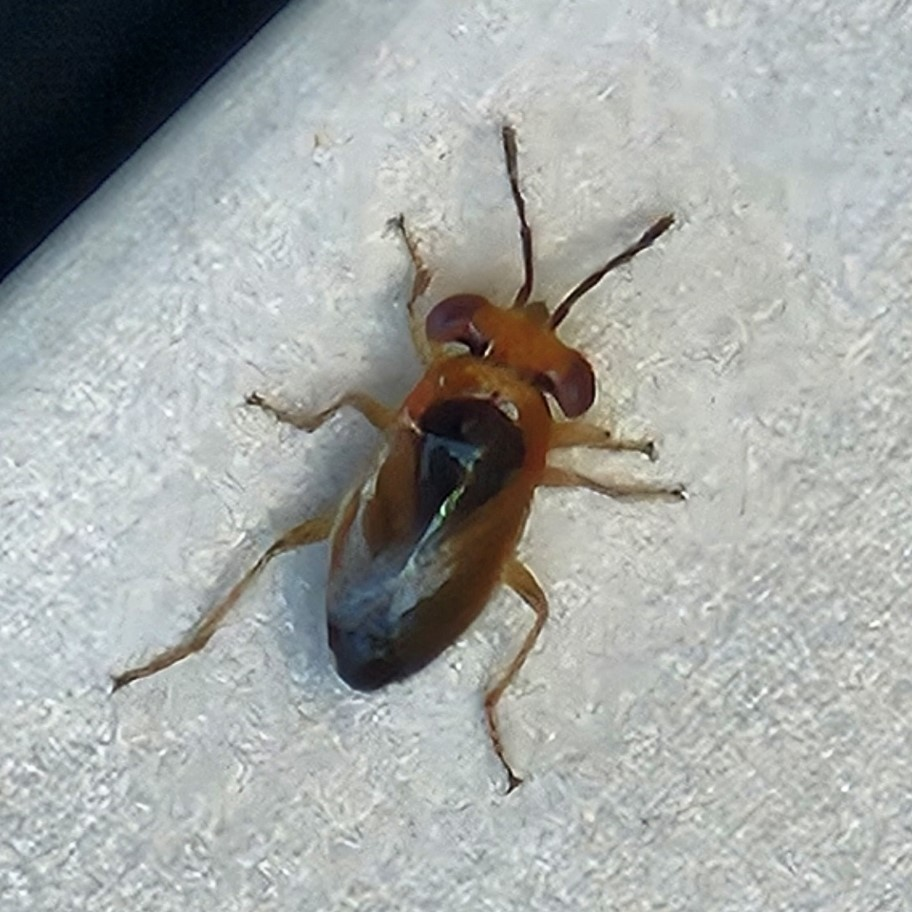
- Isthmocoris imperialis

Scientific classification
- Kingdom: Animalia
- Phylum: Arthropoda
- Clade: Pancrustacea
- Class: Insecta
- Order: Hemiptera
- Suborder: Heteroptera
- Family: Geocoridae
- Subfamily: Geocorinae
- Genus: Isthmocoris; McAtee, 1914

= Isthmocoris =

Genus of true bugs

Isthmocoris is a genus of big-eyed bugs in the family Geocoridae. There are at least four described species in Isthmocoris.

== Species ==
These four species belong to the genus Isthmocoris:

- Isthmocoris imperialis (Distant, 1893)
- Isthmocoris piceus (Say, 1831) - type species (as Salda picea)
- Isthmocoris slevini (Van Duzee, 1928)
- Isthmocoris tristis (Stal, 1854)
