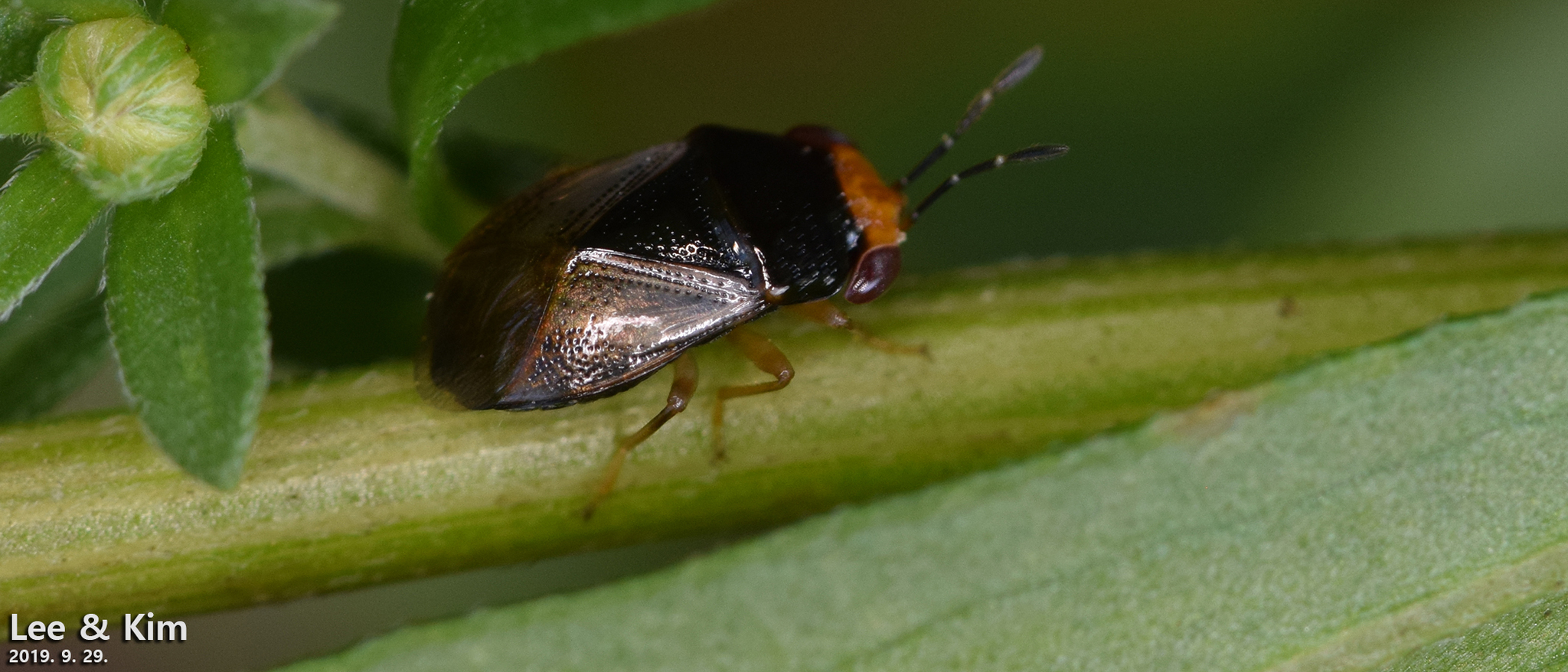
- Geocoris varius, South Korea

Scientific classification
- Kingdom: Animalia
- Phylum: Arthropoda
- Clade: Pancrustacea
- Class: Insecta
- Order: Hemiptera
- Suborder: Heteroptera
- Family: Geocoridae
- Subfamily: Geocorinae
- Genus: Geocoris
- Species: G. varius

Binomial name
- Geocoris varius (Uhler, 1860)

= Geocoris varius =

Species of big-eyed bug

Geocoris varius is a species of big-eyed bug in the family Geocoridae, found in eastern Asia.
