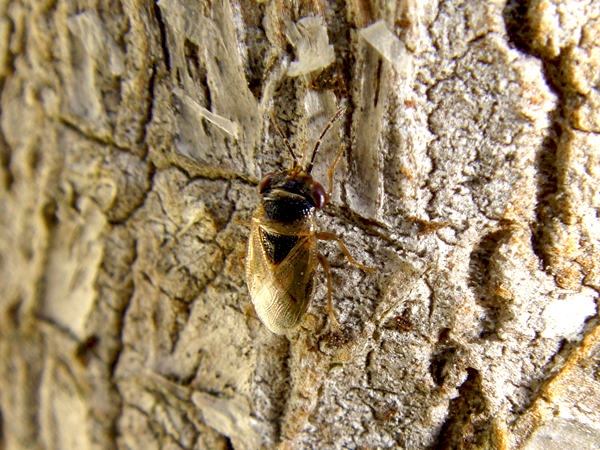
- Geocoris megacephalus

Scientific classification
- Kingdom: Animalia
- Phylum: Arthropoda
- Clade: Pancrustacea
- Class: Insecta
- Order: Hemiptera
- Suborder: Heteroptera
- Family: Geocoridae
- Subfamily: Geocorinae
- Genus: Geocoris
- Species: G. megacephalus

Binomial name
- Geocoris megacephalus (Rossi, 1790)

= Geocoris megacephalus =

Species of big-eyed bug

Geocoris megacephalus is a species of big-eyed bug in the family Geocoridae, found in the Palearctic.

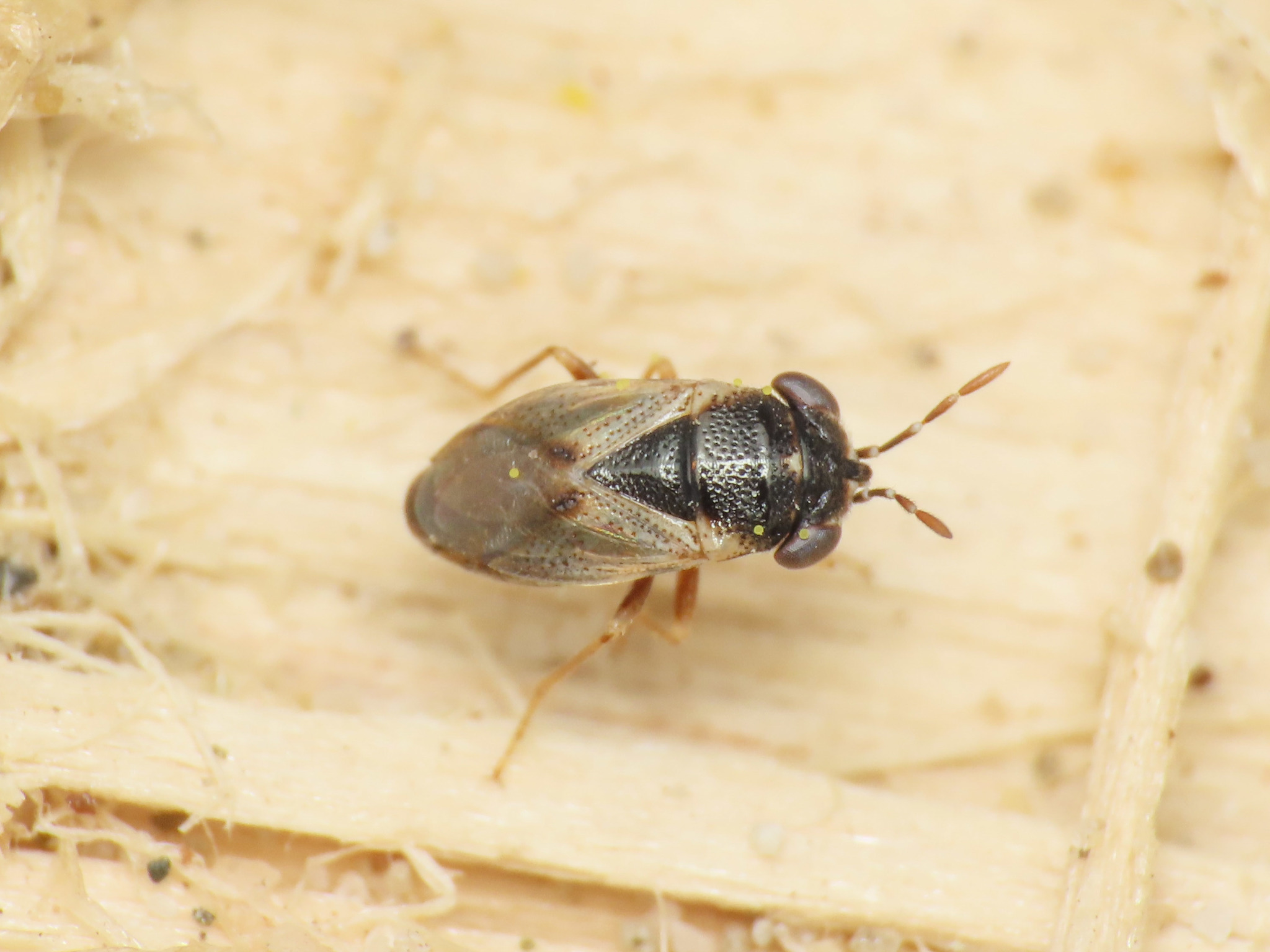
Geocoris megacephalus, Italia

== Subspecies ==
These six subspecies belong to the species Geocoris megacephalus:

- Geocoris megacephalus mediterraneus Puton, 1878
- Geocoris megacephalus megacephalus (Rossi, 1790)
- Geocoris megacephalus occipitalis (Dufour *, 1857)
- Geocoris megacephalus puberulus Montandon, 1907
- Geocoris megacephalus siculus (Fieber, 1844)
- Geocoris megacephalus villosulus Montandon, 1907
