= Geocoris atricolor =

Scientific classification
- Domain: Eukaryota
- Kingdom: Animalia
- Phylum: Arthropoda
- Class: Insecta
- Order: Hemiptera
- Suborder: Heteroptera
- Family: Geocoridae
- Genus: Geocoris
- Species: G. atricolor

Binomial name
- Geocoris atricolor Montandon, 1908

Species of true bug

Geocoris atricolor is a species of big-eyed bug in the family Geocoridae. It is found in North America.
