= Geocoris grylloides =

Scientific classification
- Kingdom: Animalia
- Phylum: Arthropoda
- Class: Insecta
- Order: Hemiptera
- Suborder: Heteroptera
- Family: Geocoridae
- Genus: Geocoris
- Species: G. grylloides

Binomial name
- Geocoris grylloides (Linnaeus, 1761)

Synonyms
- Ophthalmicus grylloides (Linnaeus, 1761); Cimex grylloides Linnaeus, 1761

Species of true bug

Geocoris grylloides is a species of big-eyed bug in the family Geocoridae. It was described 1761 by Carl Linnaeus
