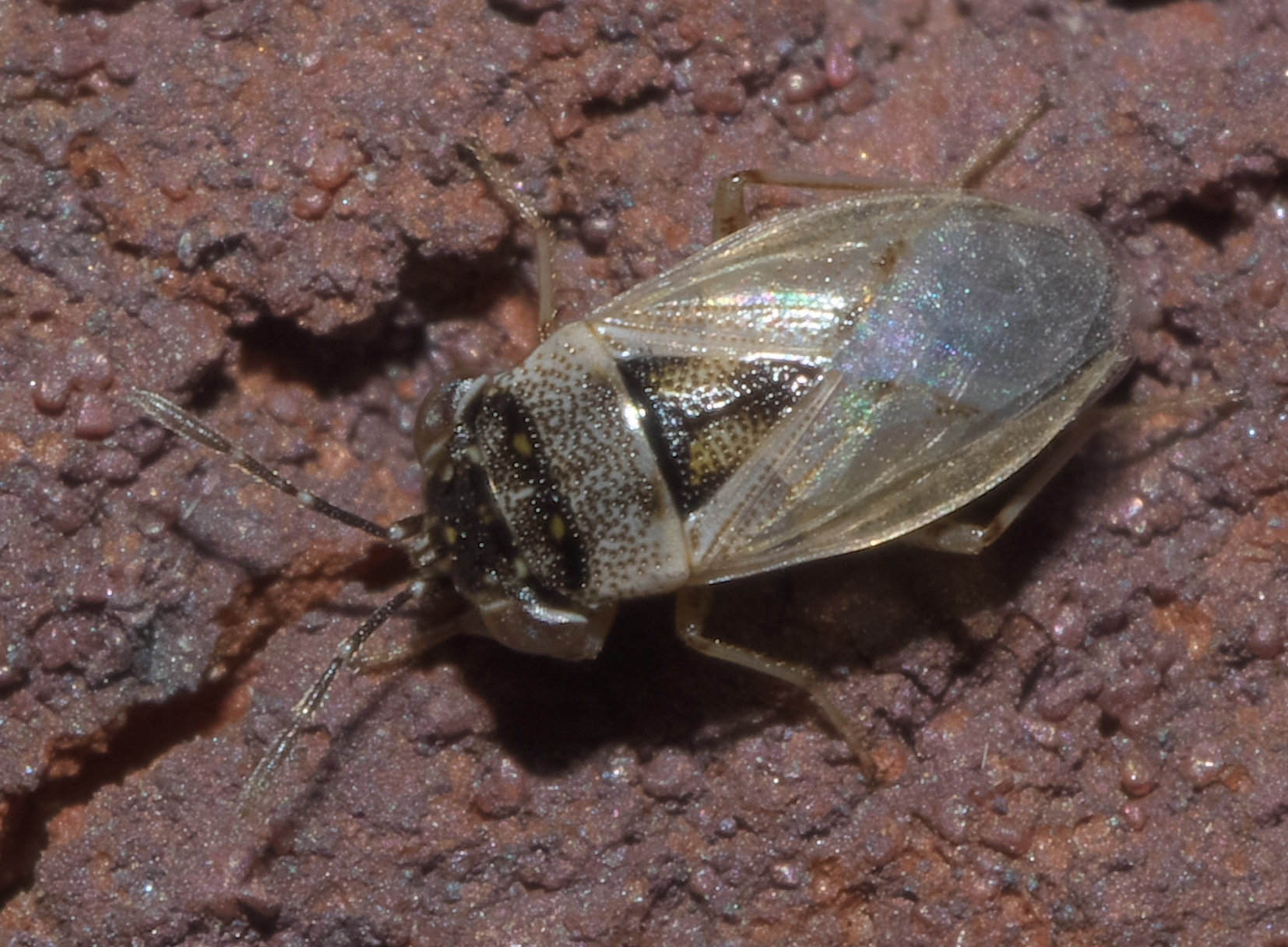

Scientific classification
- Domain: Eukaryota
- Kingdom: Animalia
- Phylum: Arthropoda
- Class: Insecta
- Order: Hemiptera
- Suborder: Heteroptera
- Family: Geocoridae
- Genus: Geocoris
- Species: G. punctipes

Binomial name
- Geocoris punctipes (Say, 1832)

= Geocoris punctipes =

Species of true bug

Geocoris punctipes, the big-eye bug, is a species of big-eyed bug in the family Geocoridae. It is found in the Caribbean, Central America, North America, Oceania, and South America.

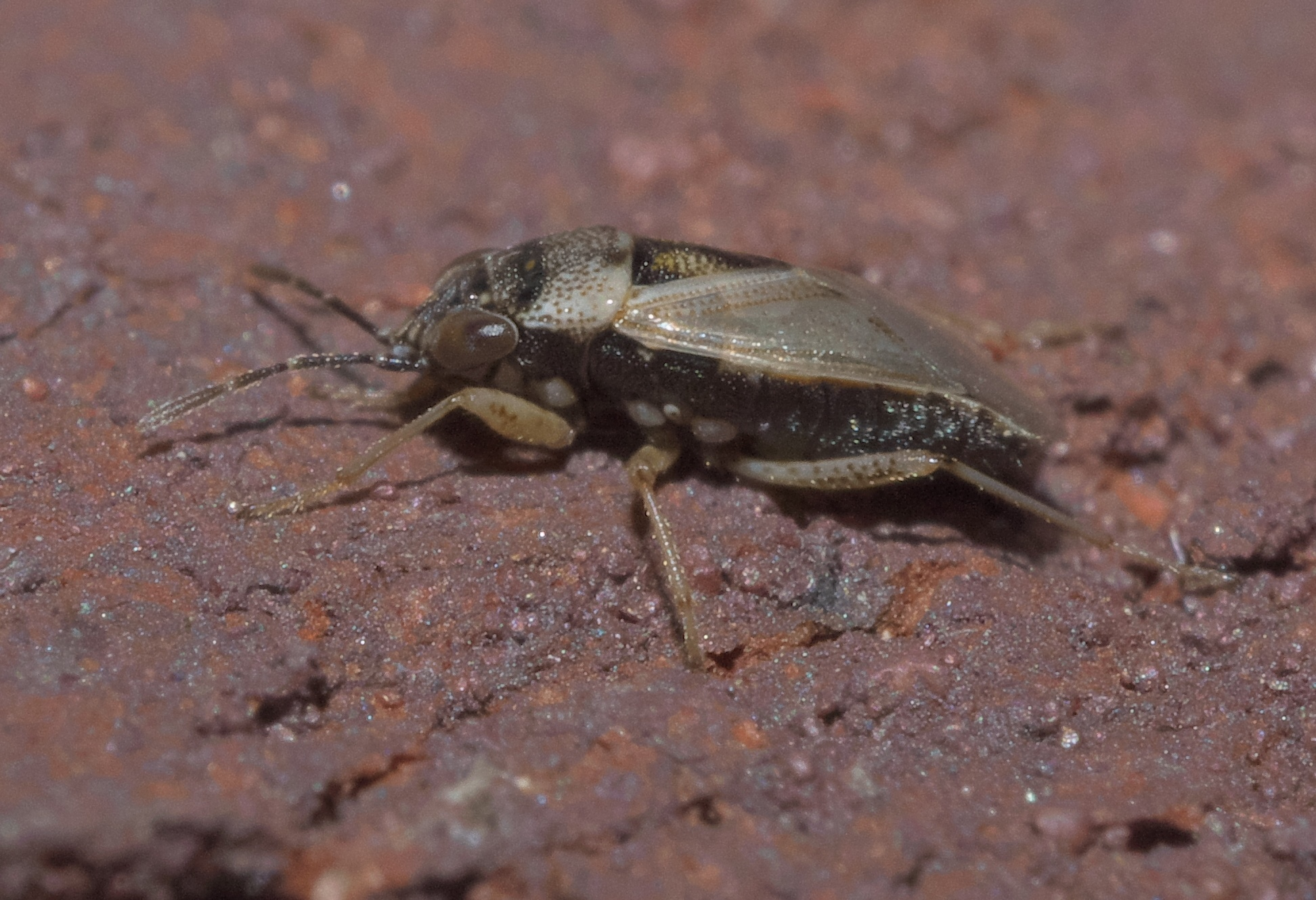
Big-eye bug, Geocoris punctipes

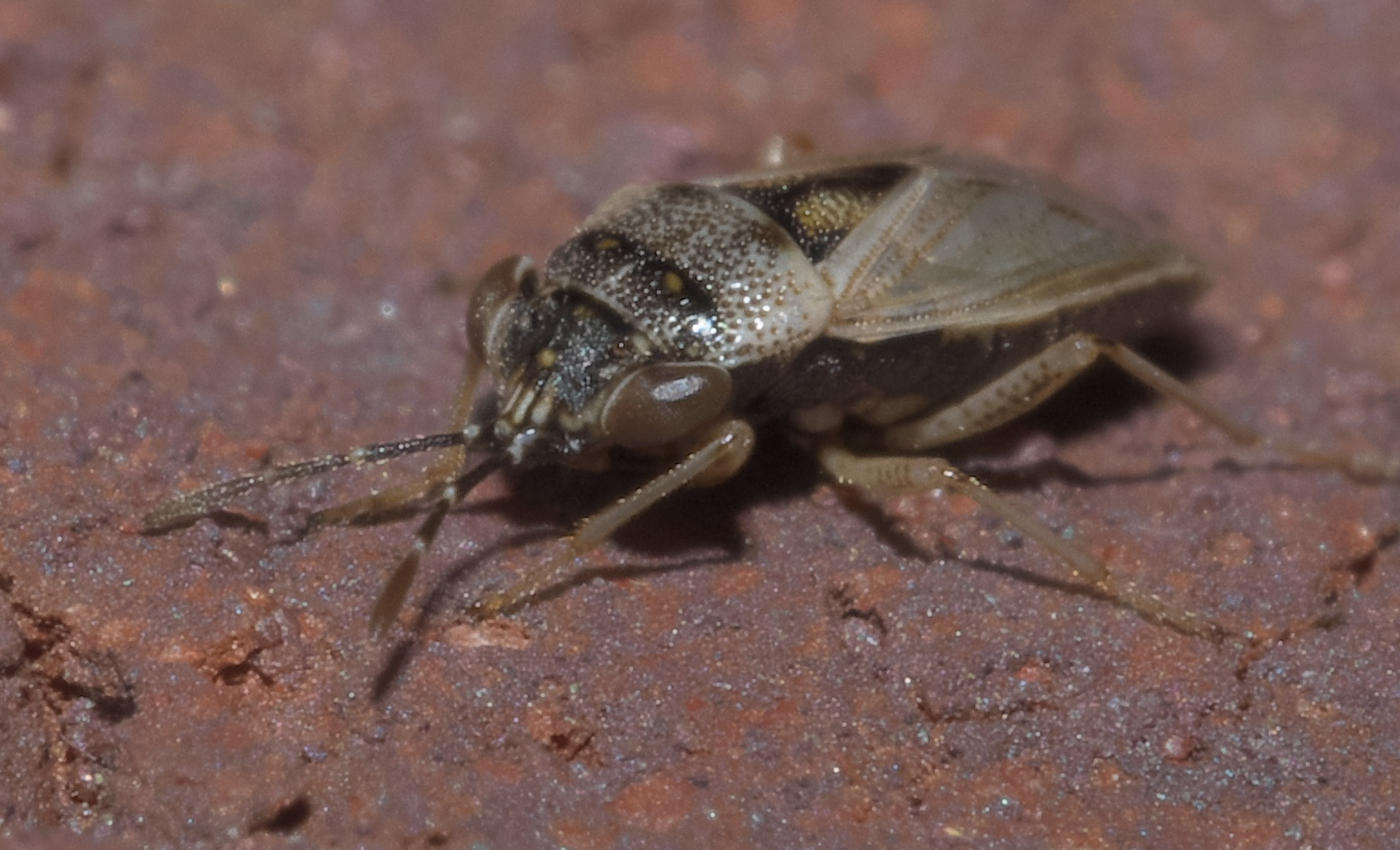
Big-eye bug, Geocoris punctipes
