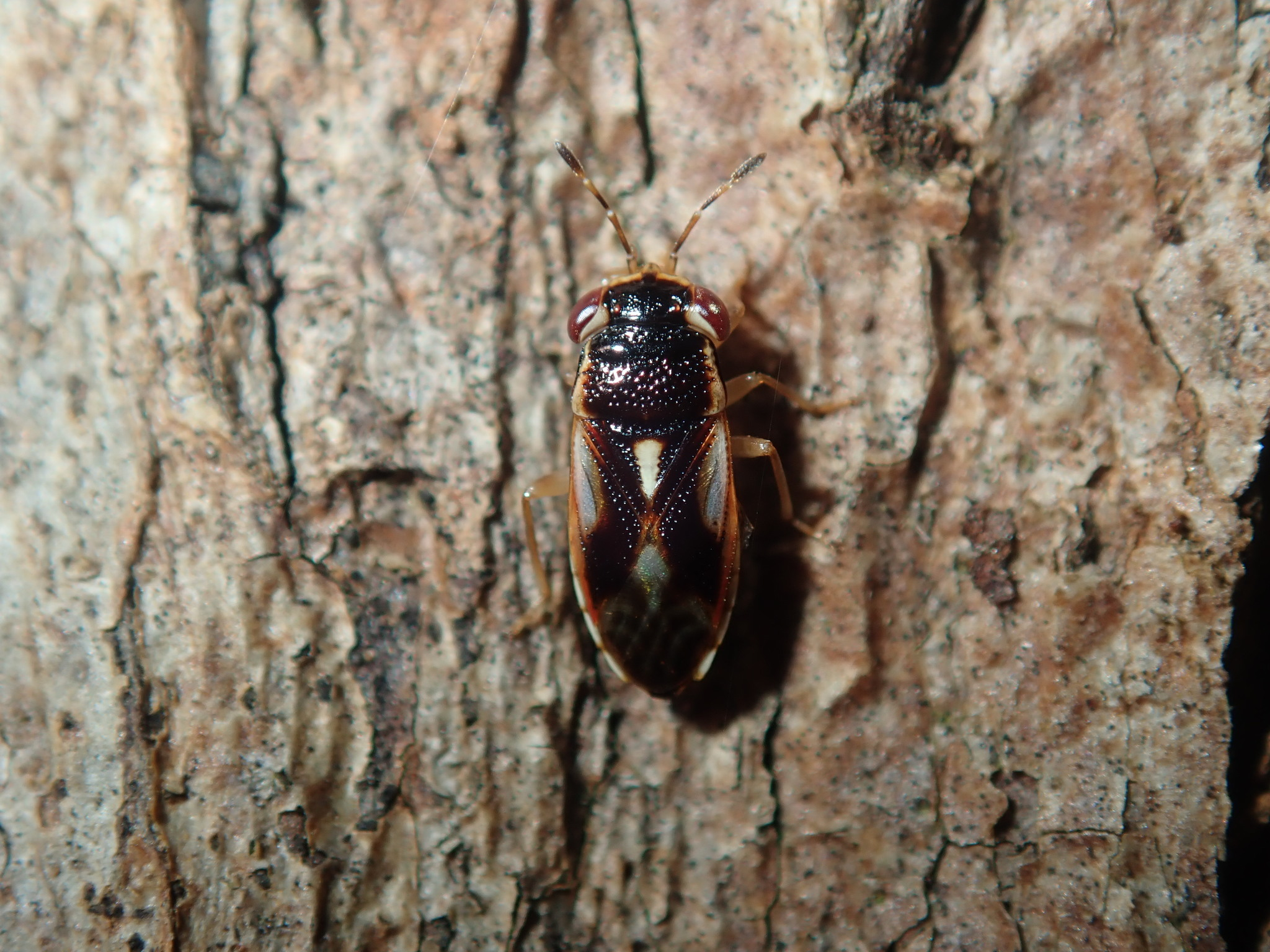
- Stylogeocoris elongatus

Scientific classification
- Domain: Eukaryota
- Kingdom: Animalia
- Phylum: Arthropoda
- Class: Insecta
- Order: Hemiptera
- Suborder: Heteroptera
- Family: Geocoridae
- Subfamily: Geocorinae
- Genus: Stylogeocoris; Montandon, 1913

= Stylogeocoris =

Genus of true bugs

Stylogeocoris is a genus in the family Geocoridae. There are five described species in Stylogeocoris.

== Species ==
- Stylogeocoris biroi (Montandont, 1913)
- Stylogeocoris capricornutus (Kirkaldy, 1907)
- Stylogeocoris convivus (Distant, 1901)
- Stylogeocoris elongatus (Distant, 1901)
- Stylogeocoris maculatus (Malipatil, 1994)
