= Geocoris discopterus =

Scientific classification
- Kingdom: Animalia
- Phylum: Arthropoda
- Clade: Pancrustacea
- Class: Insecta
- Order: Hemiptera
- Suborder: Heteroptera
- Family: Geocoridae
- Genus: Geocoris
- Species: G. discopterus

Binomial name
- Geocoris discopterus Stal, 1874

Species of true bug

Geocoris discopterus is a species of big-eyed bug in the family Geocoridae. It is found in North America.
