= Geocoris frisoni =

Scientific classification
- Domain: Eukaryota
- Kingdom: Animalia
- Phylum: Arthropoda
- Class: Insecta
- Order: Hemiptera
- Suborder: Heteroptera
- Family: Geocoridae
- Genus: Geocoris
- Species: G. frisoni

Binomial name
- Geocoris frisoni Barber, 1926

Species of true bug

Geocoris frisoni is a species of big-eyed bug in the family Geocoridae. It is found in North America.
