= Geocoris bullatus =

Scientific classification
- Domain: Eukaryota
- Kingdom: Animalia
- Phylum: Arthropoda
- Class: Insecta
- Order: Hemiptera
- Suborder: Heteroptera
- Family: Geocoridae
- Genus: Geocoris
- Species: G. bullatus

Binomial name
- Geocoris bullatus (Say, 1832)

Species of true bug

Geocoris bullatus, the large big-eyed bug, is a species of big-eyed bug in the family Geocoridae. It is found in North America.

== Subspecies ==
These three subspecies belong to the species Geocoris bullatus:

- Geocoris bullatus borealis (Dallas, 1852)
- Geocoris bullatus bullatus (Say, 1831)
- Geocoris bullatus obscuratus Montandon, 1908
