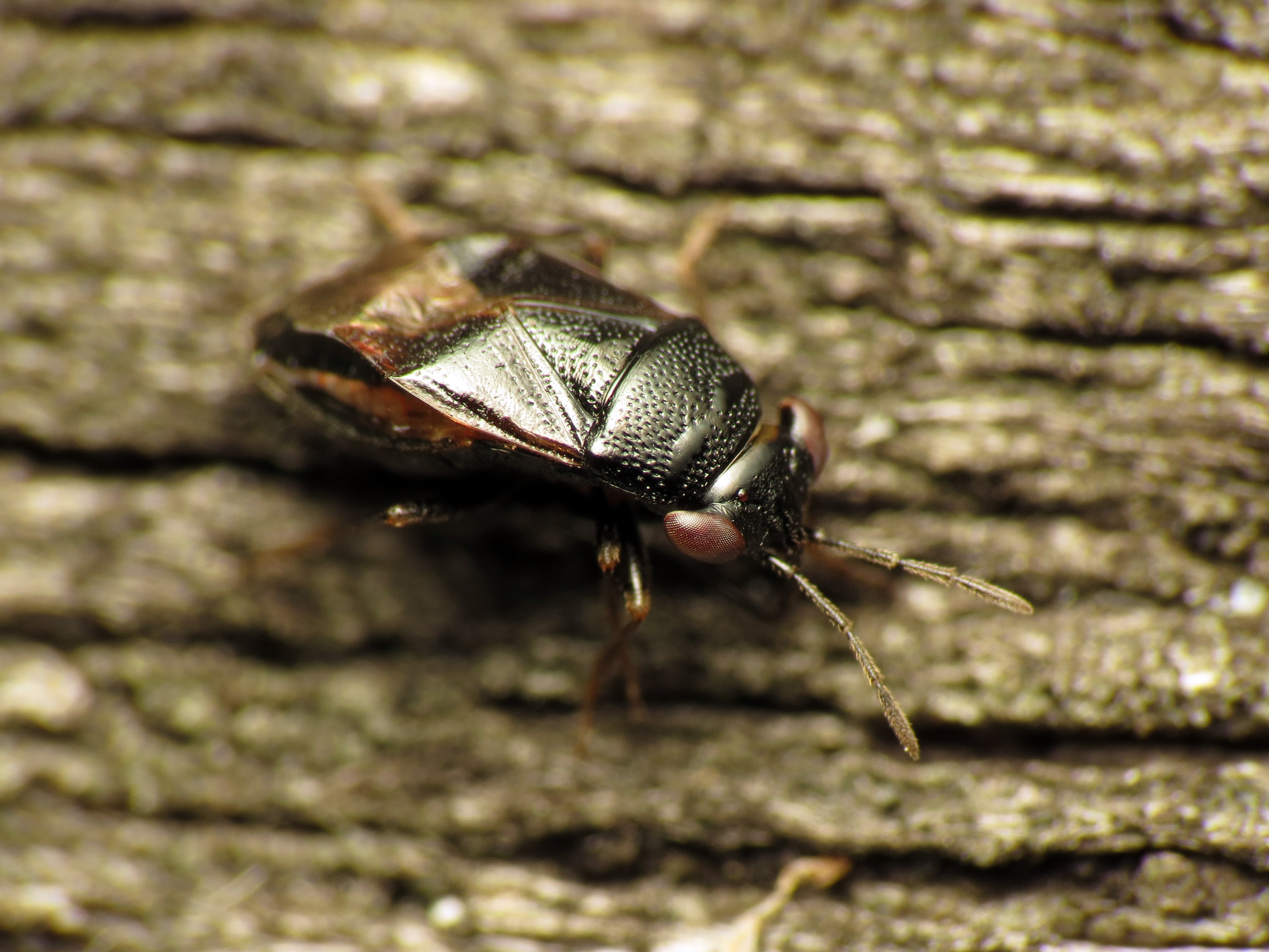

Scientific classification
- Domain: Eukaryota
- Kingdom: Animalia
- Phylum: Arthropoda
- Class: Insecta
- Order: Hemiptera
- Suborder: Heteroptera
- Family: Geocoridae
- Genus: Geocoris
- Species: G. uliginosus

Binomial name
- Geocoris uliginosus (Say, 1832)

= Geocoris uliginosus =

Species of true bug

Geocoris uliginosus is a species of big-eyed bug in the family Geocoridae. It is found in North America.
