= Geocoris limbatus =

Scientific classification
- Domain: Eukaryota
- Kingdom: Animalia
- Phylum: Arthropoda
- Class: Insecta
- Order: Hemiptera
- Suborder: Heteroptera
- Family: Geocoridae
- Genus: Geocoris
- Species: G. limbatus

Binomial name
- Geocoris limbatus (Stal, 1874)

Species of true bug

Geocoris limbatus is a species of big-eyed bug in the family Geocoridae. It is found in North America.
