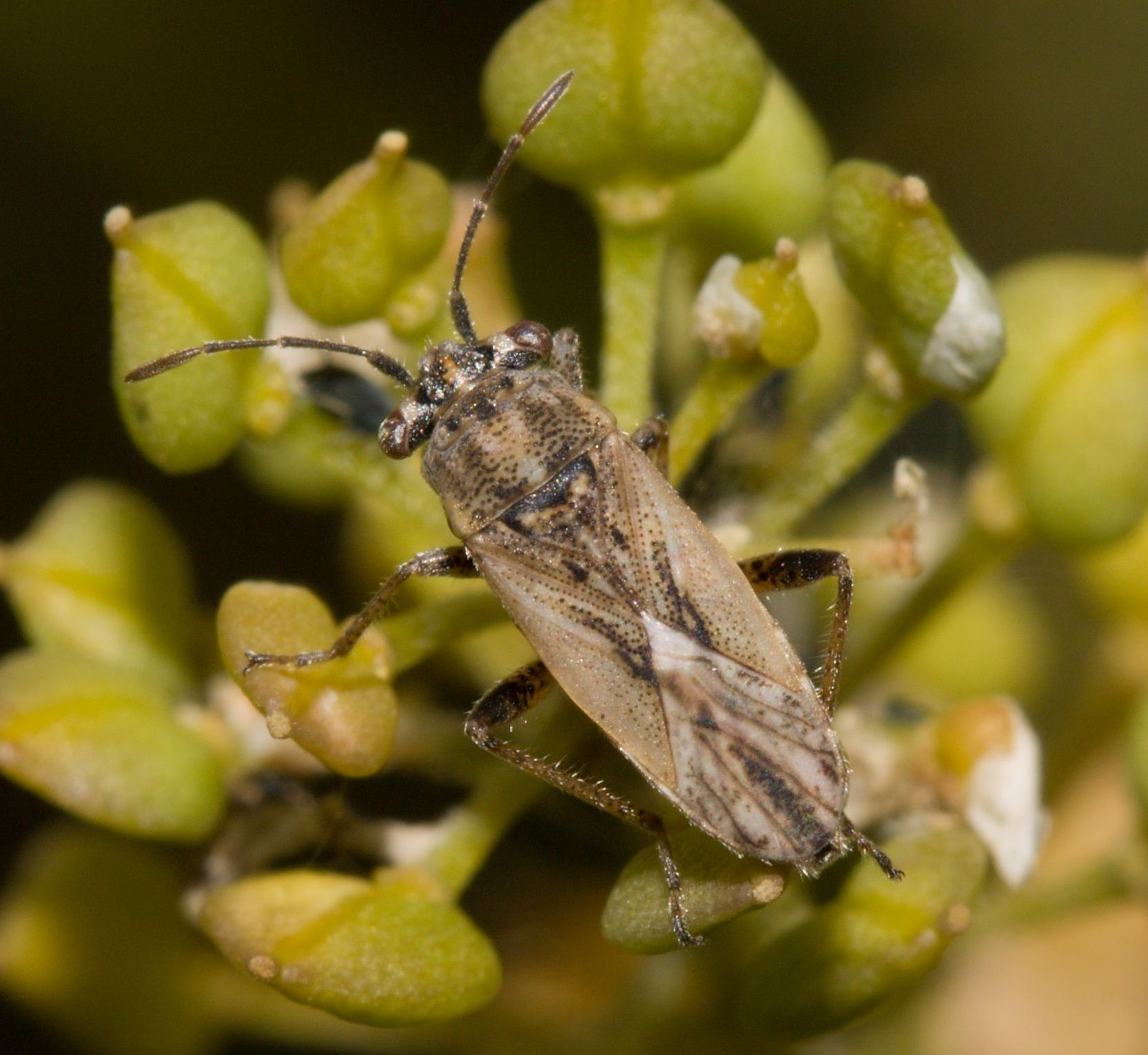
- Henestaris halophilus

Scientific classification
- Domain: Eukaryota
- Kingdom: Animalia
- Phylum: Arthropoda
- Class: Insecta
- Order: Hemiptera
- Suborder: Heteroptera
- Superfamily: Lygaeoidea
- Family: Geocoridae
- Subfamily: Henestarinae
- Genus: Henestaris; Spinola, 1837

= Henestaris =

Genus of insects

Henestaris is a genus of mostly European bugs, it is typical of the subfamily Henestarinae.

== Species ==
The Lygaeoidea Species File lists:

1. Henestaris halophilus (Burmeister, 1835)
2. Henestaris irroratus Horvath, 1892
3. Henestaris kareli Hoberlandt, 1956
4. Henestaris laticeps (Curtis, 1837) - type species (as Henestaris genei Spinola = H. laticeps laticeps)
5. Henestaris oschanini Bergroth, 1919
6. Henestaris thoracicus Schmidt, 1939
