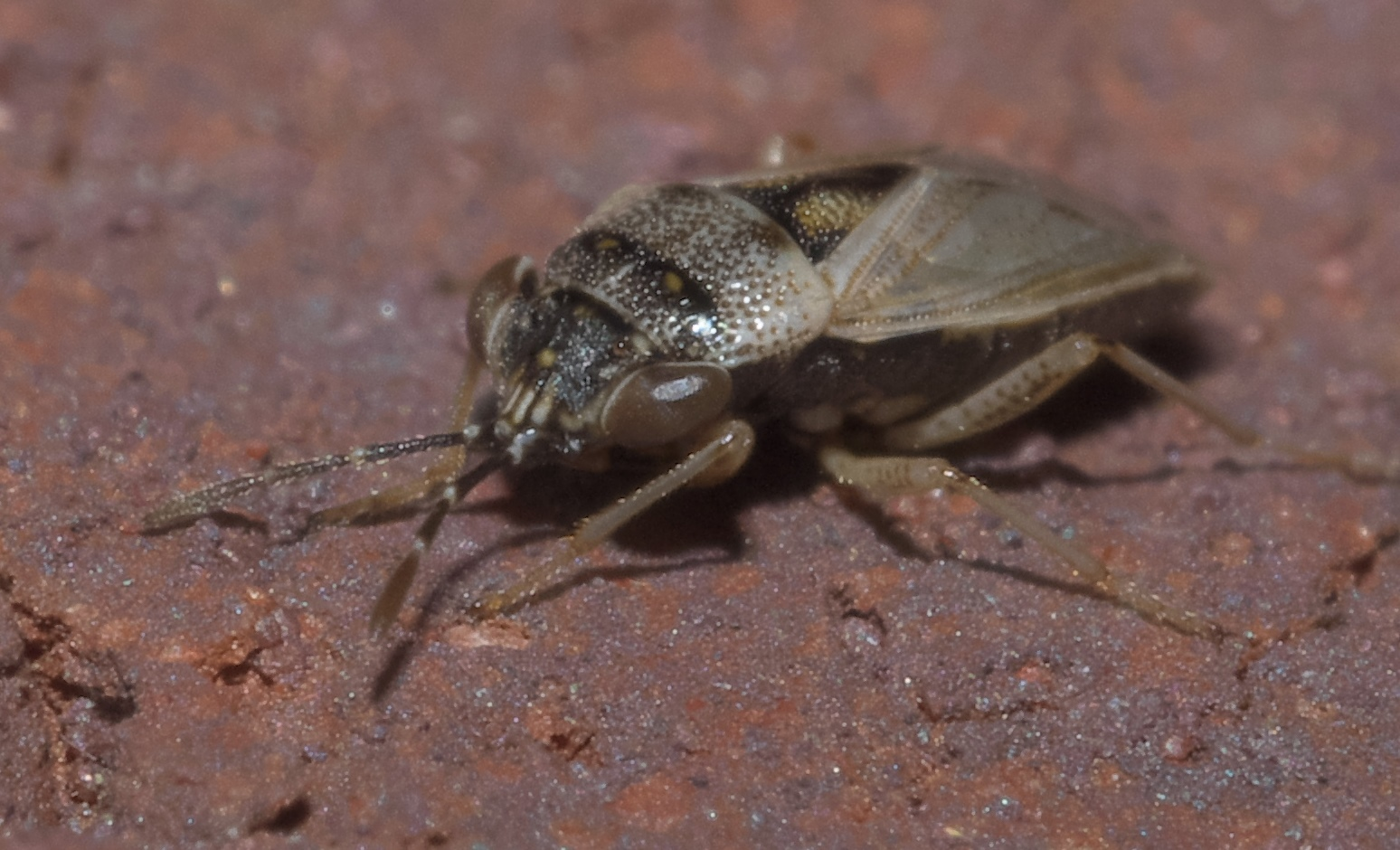
- Geocoris pallens, Oklahoma

Scientific classification
- Kingdom: Animalia
- Phylum: Arthropoda
- Class: Insecta
- Order: Hemiptera
- Suborder: Heteroptera
- Family: Geocoridae
- Genus: Geocoris
- Species: G. pallens

Binomial name
- Geocoris pallens Stal, 1854

= Geocoris pallens =

Species of true bug

Geocoris pallens, the western big-eyed bug, is a species of big-eyed bug in the family Geocoridae. It is found in Central America, North America, and Oceania.

These insects are carnivorous and feed on aphids, leafhoppers and seed bugs, which makes them important for pest control, and both adults and young are predatory. Adults are active from spring to summer.

== Subspecies ==
These two subspecies belong to the species Geocoris pallens:

- Geocoris pallens pallens Stal, 1854
- Geocoris pallens solutus Montandon, 1908
