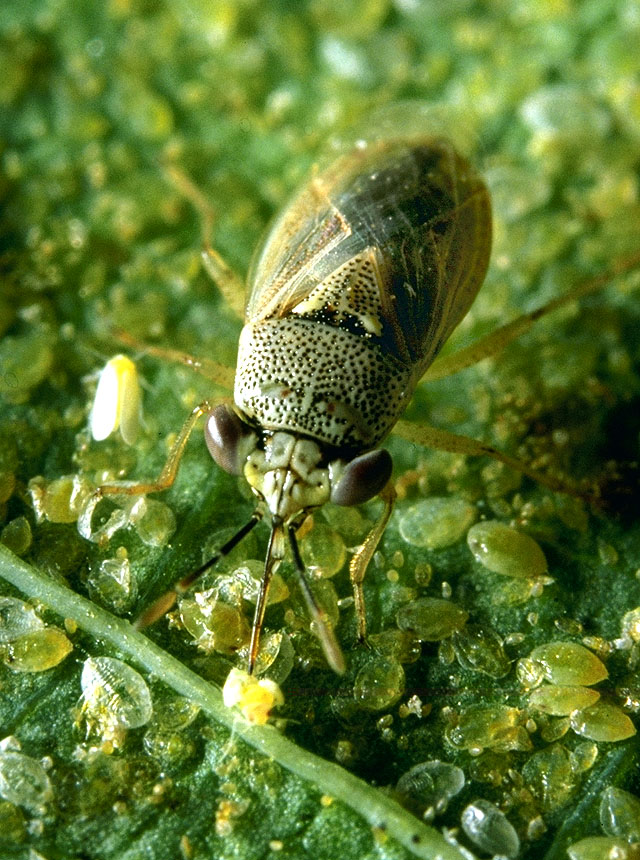
- Geocoris punctipes

Scientific classification
- Kingdom: Animalia
- Phylum: Arthropoda
- Class: Insecta
- Order: Hemiptera
- Suborder: Heteroptera
- Family: Geocoridae
- Subfamily: Geocorinae
- Genus: Geocoris; Fallén, 1814

Diversity
- More than 140 species

Synonyms
- Ophthalmicus Schilling, 1829

= Geocoris =

Genus of true bugs

Geocoris is a genus of insects in the family Geocoridae (although in the past the geocorids were subsumed as a subfamily under the family "Lygaeidae"). Commonly known as big-eyed bugs, the species in Geocoris are beneficial predators, but are often confused with the true chinch bug, which is a pest. There are more than 140 described species in Geocoris.

== Description ==
Big-eyed bugs are true bugs in the order Hemiptera. The two most common North American species are Geocoris pallens and Geocoris punctipes. Both are predators and occur in many habitats, including fields, gardens, and turf grass. Big-eyed bugs are considered an important predator in many agricultural systems and feed on mites, insect eggs, and small insects such as pink bollworm, cabbage loopers, and whiteflies. Adult big-eyed bugs are small (about 3 mm (0.12 in)) black, gray, or tan with proportionately large eyes. Eggs are deposited singly or in clusters on leaves near potential prey. They develop with incomplete metamorphosis (there is no pupa) and take approximately 30 days to develop from egg to adult depending on temperature. Both nymphs and adults are predatory, but can survive on nectar and honeydew when prey are scarce. Big-eyed bugs, like other true bugs, have piercing-sucking mouthparts and feed by stabbing their prey and sucking or lapping the juices. Although their effectiveness as predators is not well understood, studies have shown that nymphs can eat as many as 1600 spider mites before reaching adulthood, while adults have been reported consuming as many as 80 mites per day.

== Selected species ==
- Geocoris atricolor Montandon, 1908
- Geocoris bullatus (Say, 1832) (large big-eyed bug)
- Geocoris discopterus Stal, 1874
- Geocoris floridanus Blatchley, 1926 (Florida big-eyed bug)
- Geocoris frisoni Barber, 1926
- Geocoris grylloides (Linnaeus, 1761) - type species (as Cimex grylloides L.) - mainland Europe
- Geocoris howardi Montandon, 1908
- Geocoris limbatus Stal, 1874
- Geocoris megacephalus (Rossi, 1790)
- Geocoris pallens Stal, 1854 (western big-eyed bug)
- Geocoris punctipes (Say, 1832) (big-eye bug)
- Geocoris uliginosus (Say, 1832)

== See also ==
- List of Geocoris species
