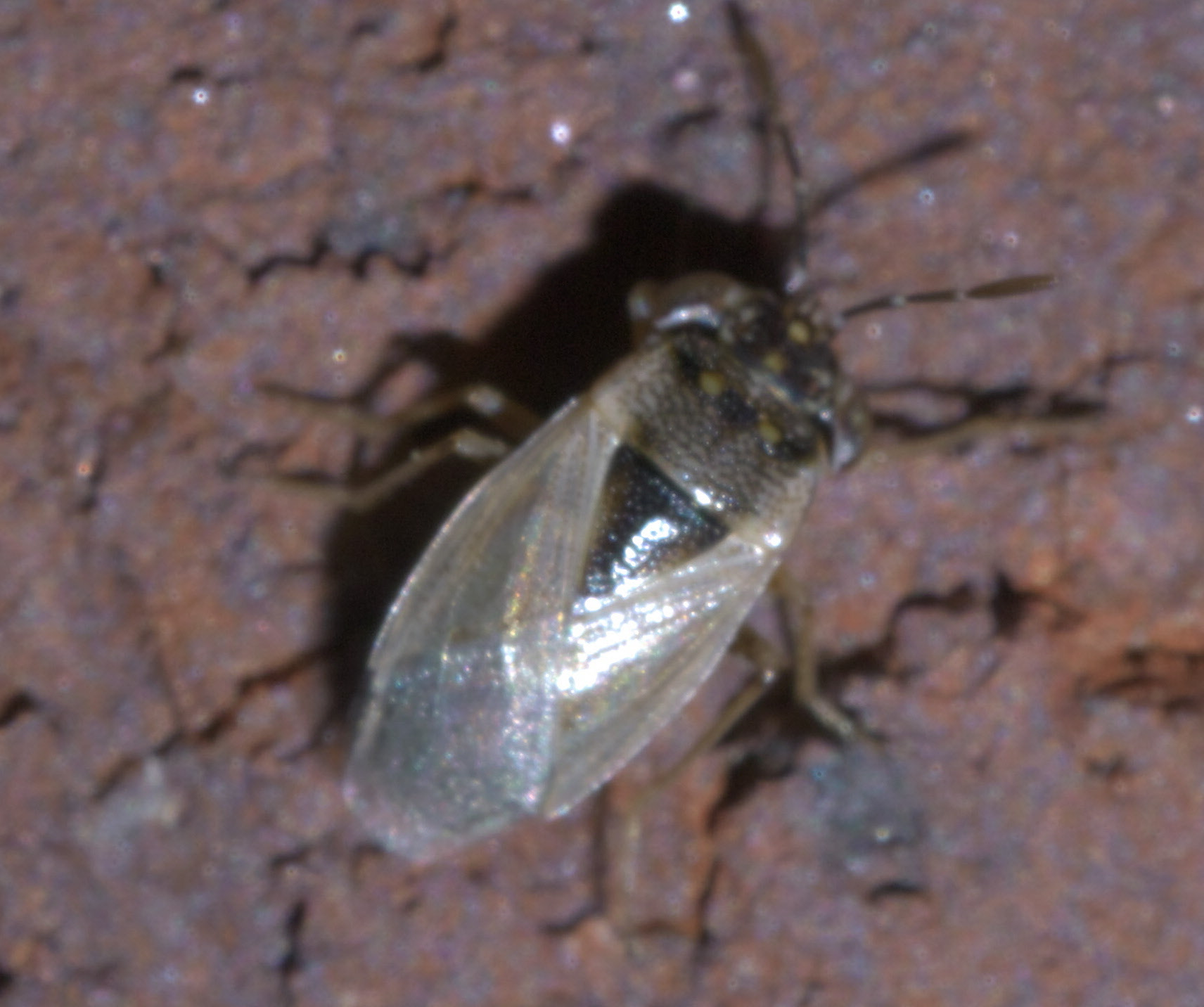
- Geocoris sp.

Scientific classification
- Domain: Eukaryota
- Kingdom: Animalia
- Phylum: Arthropoda
- Class: Insecta
- Order: Hemiptera
- Suborder: Heteroptera
- Infraorder: Pentatomomorpha
- Superfamily: Lygaeoidea
- Family: Geocoridae; Baerensprung, 1860

= Geocoridae =

Family of true bugs

Geocoridae is a family of big-eyed bugs in the order Hemiptera. There are more than 290 described species in Geocoridae.

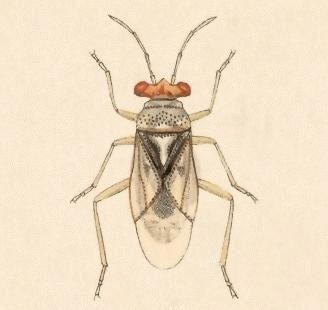
Ninyas torvus

== Subfamilies and Genera ==
The Lygaeoidea Species File includes five subfamilies:

=== Australocorinae ===
1. Australocoris Malipatil, 2012

=== Bledionotinae ===
Auth.: Reuter, 1978 all genera:

1. Bledionotus Reuter, 1878

=== Geocorinae ===
1. Apennocoris Montandon, 1907
2. Ausogeocoris Malipatil, 2013
3. Capitostylus Malipatil, 2013
4. Geocoris Fallen, 1814
5. Geocoroides Distant, 1918
6. Germalus Stål, 1862
7. Hypogeocoris Montandon, 1913
8. Isthmocoris McAtee, 1914
9. Mallocoris Stål, 1872
10. Nannogermalus Kóbor & Kondorosy, 2020
11. Nesogermalus Bergroth, 1916
12. Ninyas Distant, 1882
13. Pseudogeocoris Montandon, 1913
14. Stenogeocoris Montandon, 1913
15. Stenophthalmicus Costa, 1875
16. Stylogeocoris Montandon, 1913
17. Umbrageocoris Kóbor, 2019
18. Unicageocoris Malipatil, 2013

=== Henestarinae ===
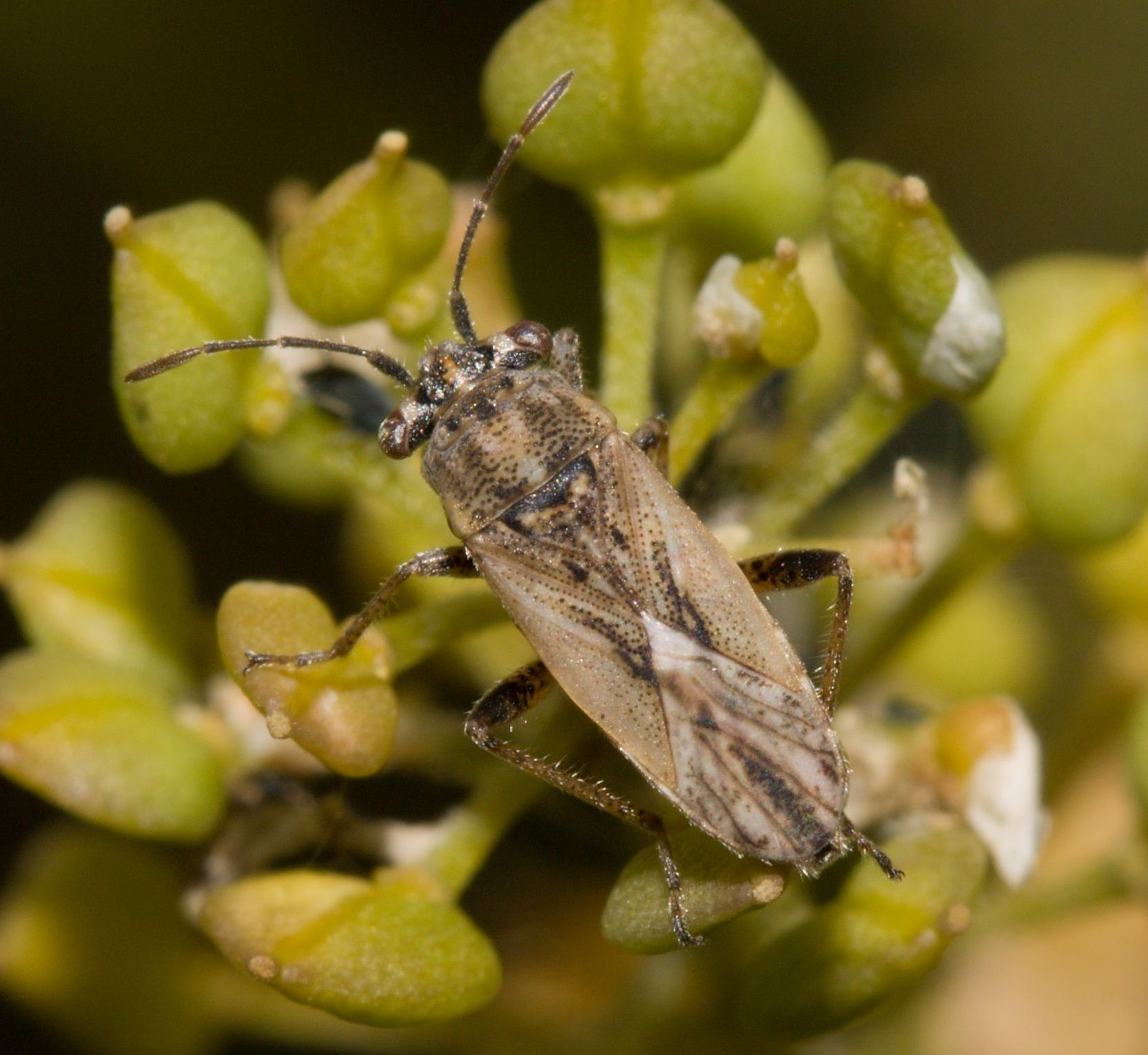
Henestaris halophilus

1. Coriantipus Bergroth, 1912
2. Engistus Fieber, 1864
3. Henestaris Spinola, 1837

=== Pamphantinae ===
(Auth. Barber & Bruner, 1933)

tribe Cattarini

1. Cattarus Stal, 1858
2. Cephalocattarus Slater & Henry, 1999

tribe Epipopolini

1. Epipolops Herrich-Schaeffer, 1850

tribe Indopamphantini

1. Indopamphantus Malipatil, 2017
2. Parapamphantus Barber, 1954

tribe Pamphantini

1. Abpamphantus Barber, 1954
2. Austropamphantus Slater, 1981
3. Cymapamphantus Henry, 2013
4. Neopamphantus Barber & Bruner, 1933
5. Pamphantus Stål, 1874
6. Parapamphantus Barber, 1954
7. Tropicoparapamphantus Brailovsky, 1989
