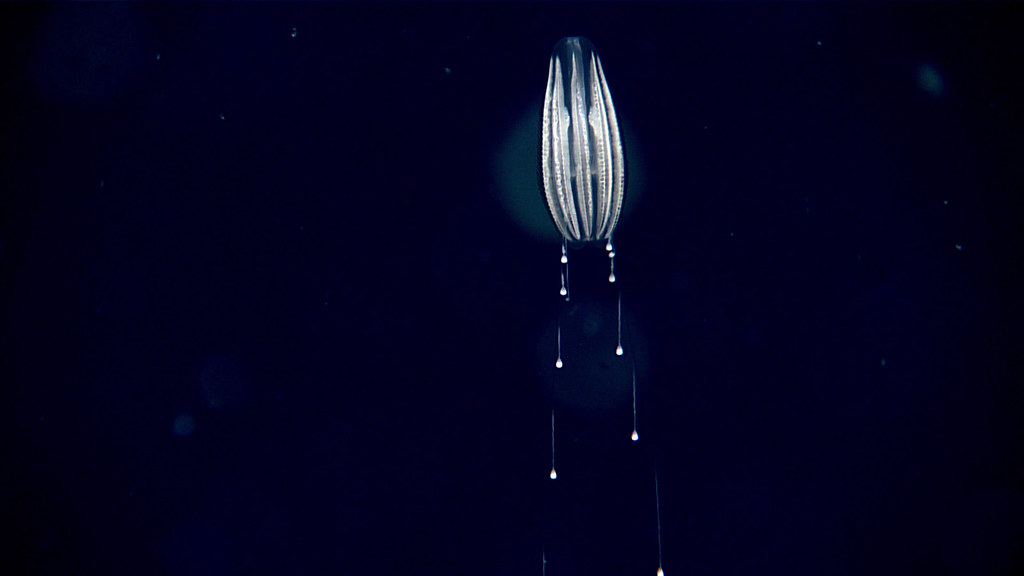

Scientific classification
- Kingdom: Animalia
- Phylum: Ctenophora
- Class: Tentaculata
- Order: Cydippida
- Family: Euplokamididae; Mills, 1987
- Genus: Euplokamis; Chun, 1879

Synonyms
- Euplokamidae Mills, 1987

= Euplokamis =

Genus of ctenophores

Euplokamis is a genus of ctenophores, or comb jellies, belonging to the monotypic family Euplokamididae. It shares the common name sea gooseberry with species of the genus Pleurobrachia. After being originally described by Chun (1879), the family Euplokamididae was expanded by Mills (1987) due to the discovery of a new species, Euplokamis dunlapae. Further research indicated that Euplokamis should be identified from Mertensiidae due to the rows of combs and some compression. They may also be distinguished from the genus Pleurobrachia due to their more elongated shape. Additionally, various adaptations of Euplokamis have been observed such as the use of tentacles for movement/feeding, a complex nervous system, and bioluminescent capabilities. Other characteristics including a defined mesoderm, lack of stinging cells, developmental differences, and symmetry supported the reclassification of these organisms.

== Distribution & Habitat ==
Originally, Cnidarians and Ctenophores were classified under the same phyla, Coelenterata. Ctenophore bodies are made up of a gelatin substance, similar to Cnidarians, but the multiple rows of combs present in fossil records are unique to ctenophores. Records of Euplokamis sp. indicate they are distributed widely around the world, but are most often found in warm coastal waters. Euplokamis prefer marine, or saltwater, environments and are classified as free swimmers, due to their ability to move through the water column. They have been identified in the Mediterranean Sea, the North Pacific, the Gulf of Maine, and off the coast of Sweden. However, since this genus was originally grouped in the family Pleurobrachiidae, there is limited information regarding their actual distribution and habitat.

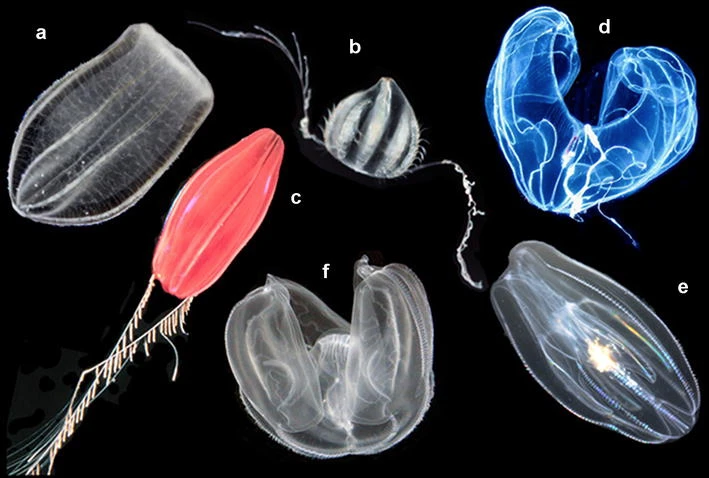
Figure 1. Pelagic ctenophores: (a) Beroe ovata, (b) unidentified cydippid (c) "Tortugas red" cydippid, (d) Bathocyroe fosteri, (e) Mnemiopsis leidyi, and (f) Ocyropsis sp. from Wikipedia Commons

== Anatomy & Morphology ==
Ctenophores are divided into two classes based on either the presence(Tentaculata)) or the lack (Nuda) of tentacles. Within each class, there are multiple orders to further distinguish their structures and characteristics. The class Tentaculata contains the following orders: Cydippida, Lobata, and Cestida. The genus Euplokamis is part of the class tentaculate, which indicates that tentacles are present. They are also part of the order Cydippida, distinguished by their tentacles and their round body shape. Euplokamis tentacles are long, with side branches, and have a sheath allowing them to be retracted inside of the body. The tentacle side branches are known as tentilla, which in the case of Euplokamis are held tightly in coils except during the act of prey capture. Further, the widely spaced tentillia droplets allow for organisms to be classified to the genus level and are one of the only examples of striated muscle found in ctenophores.

Additionally, these organisms have bi-radial symmetry with a mouth on their front end and a statocyst, or sense organ, at the other end. The sides of their stomachs are lined with distinct bulbs, shaped like tadpoles, and unlike other well-known jellyfish, Euplokamis do not have any nematocytes, known as stinging cells. The mouth is connected to the digestive tract via the pharynx. The digestive system, or gastrovascular cavity, is made up of intricate canals that allow for both digestion and circulation to occur. They also lack an anus but are able to excrete some waste through pores on the adoral end. Typically, Euplokamis are small, only growing up to approximately 20 millimeters (mm) in length.

Another distinct feature of this genus is the eight rows of combs present. While they are known as comb plates, they are actually made up of large cilia, which are hair-like structures. These plates are unique because they consist of some of the largest known cilia found on any organism. Additionally, the combs primarily function in movement, allowing some species to move forward and backward. Since their bodies are made of the mesoglea—a translucent, gelatin-like substance—the 8 comb rows can be easily identified. These combs function in movement, due to their large ciliary structures.

== Behaviors & Adaptations ==
=== Tentacles: Movement and Feeding Behavior ===
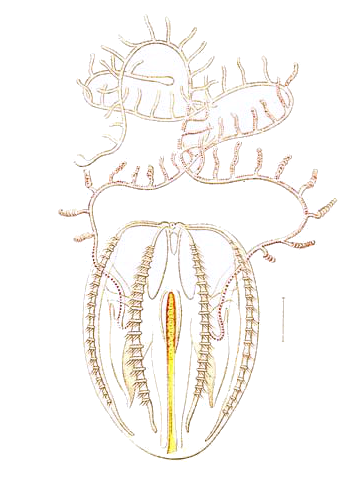
Figure 3. Structure of Ctenophora: Order Cypiddia from Wikipedia Commons

Euplokamis have long tentacles with branches that are used for feeding and movement. These branches are known as tentilla and are held tightly in coils, forming droplet shapes. The tentilla are usually held in coils but can be uncoiled to aid in movement. Further, these organisms can move their tentilla in slow spontaneous movements or in rapid extensions. According to research, Euplokamis are carnivorous, like all other known species of Ctenophores. They are known to feed primarily on rotifers and small crustaceans: including copepods, amphipods, and some planktonic larvae. To catch prey, they will extend the tentilla and wrap them around copepods. The tentilla are covered in sticky colloblasts, which keep the prey stuck in place. Not only can the tentilla be released at high velocities to quickly capture prey, but they also can be released in a slow and controlled manner, likely to attract prey. Additionally, the cilia that make up the comb plate move by making a stroke in a certain direction. After capturing prey, they can reverse the stroke, or beat, in the other direction on two rows, while the other rows continue to beat in the normal direction. They are then able to push the prey to their mouth in a sweeping motion, and the ciliary reversal causes the organism to rotate, which tangles the prey further into its mouth.

=== Nervous System ===
Despite their simple exterior, research on the nervous system of Euplokamis sp. indicates the use of more complex systems, including axons. The use of these axons has allowed some species of Euplokamis sp. to swim backward rapidly. The direction of the cilia comb plate may be reversed causing them to move backward. These organisms are unique due to the presence of giant axons in their combs that allow for a rapid escape response. Additionally, Euplokamis sp. has an aboral sensory organ, which is bypassed to produce this escape response.

=== Bioluminescence ===
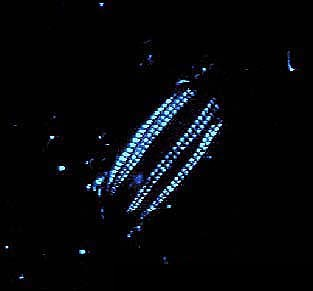
Figure 4. Bioluminescent Euplokamis sp. from Wikipedia Commons

Another adaptation that many ctenophores have developed is bioluminescence, or the ability to produce light. For example, Euplokamis dunlapae were found to produce light off the coast of Washington when exposed to stimuli. After physical stimulation, they produced bright flashes of light, consistent with bioluminescence. According to research, bioluminescence in Euplokamis sp. is both intrinsic and extrinsic, because light can appear in the comb rows or as bursts of light in the water. Additionally, off the coast of Maine, Euplokamis sp. was found to be one of the two brightest species to have bioluminescence. Research suggests that bioluminescence in Euplokamis sp. may function as a defense mechanism. The bursts of light were only observed directly in response to a disturbance or stimulation, likely to distract or blind predators when they are sensed. Additionally, some produce light as a warning signal, or to expose nearby predators. The various strategies may impact predator-prey relationships or other the population dynamics in an area.

== Taxonomy ==
- Family: Euplokamididae (Mills, 1987)
  - Genus: Euplokamis (Chun, 1879)
    - Species: Euplokamis crinita (Moser, 1909)
    - Species: Euplokamis dunlapae (Mills, 1987)
    - Species: Euplokamis evansae (Gershwin, Zeidler & Davie, 2010)
    - Species: Euplokamis helicoides (Ralph & Kaberry, 1950)
    - Species: Euplokamis octoptera (Mertens, 1833)
    - Species: Euplokamis stationis (Chun, 1879)

Changes:

- Species: Euplokamis californiensis (Torrey, 1904) accepted as Hormiphora californensis (Torrey, 1904)
- Species: Euplokamis cucumis (accepted as Hormiphora cucumis (Mertens, 1833)
