= Kleptocnidy =

Process whereby animals take and use cnidocytes from their prey

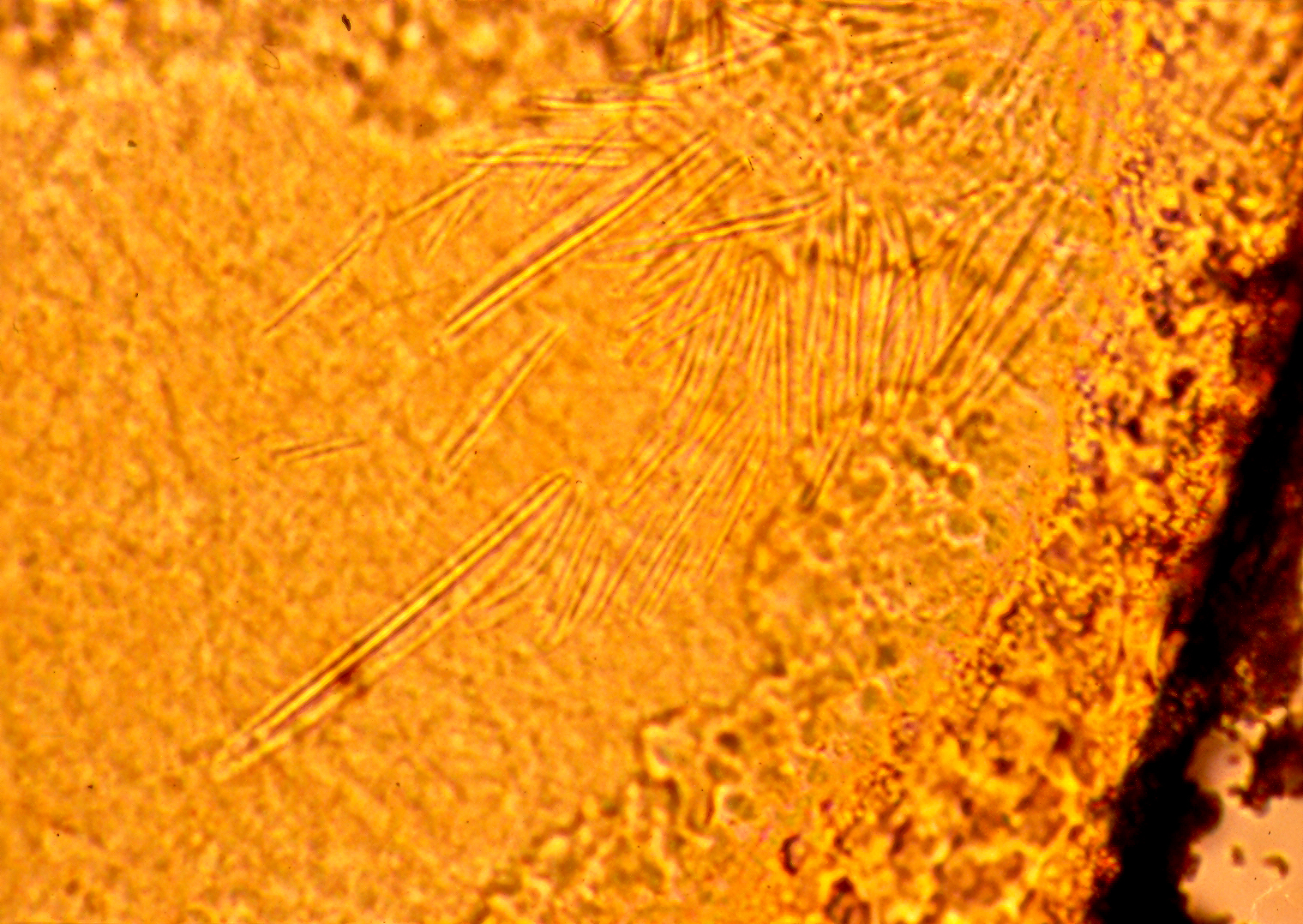
Cnidocytes of a Aptasia couchii anemone in the cnidosac of a Berghia coerulescens nudibranch

Kleptocnidy (/klɛptoʊnaɪdiː/ klept-oh-NY-dee), or nematocyst sequestration, is the process whereby organisms take and make use of the cnidocysts (stinging organelles, also known as nematocysts) of digested prey. Sequestered cnidocysts are known as kleptocnidae, and are used for defense or to capture prey. The animals preyed on for their cnidocysts are cnidarians, the group that includes jellyfish, hydroids, sea anemones, corals, among others. Nematocysts in cnidarians could have originated from a horizontal gene transfer event between the cnidarians last common ancestor, and predatory dinoflagellates of the families Warnowiaceae and Polykrikaceae.

== Etymology ==
The word "kleptocnidy" comes from the Ancient Greek words κλέπτης (kleptés, "to steal"), and κνίδη (knídē, "sea nettle"). The latter is commonly used in words relating to the phylum Cnidaria, which contains all animals that produce cnidocysts.

== Process ==
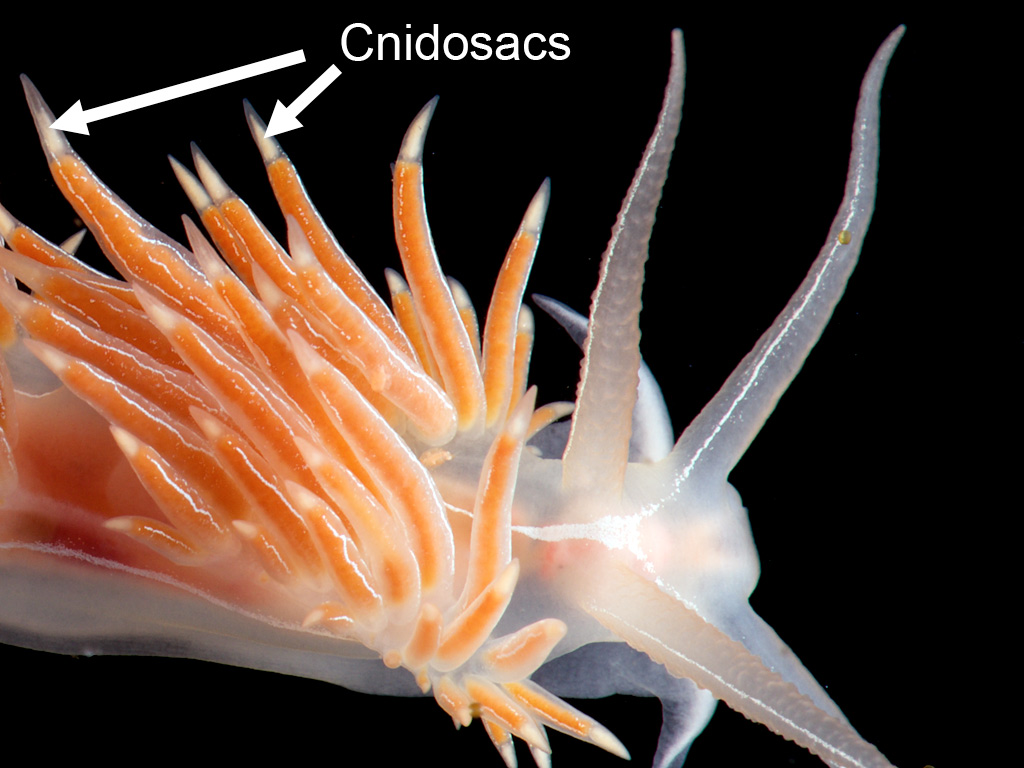
Cnidosacs at the tips of the cerata of a Coryphella lineata

Kleptocnidy occurs as a specialized form of phagocytosis, whereby cells engulf cnidocysts without triggering them.

Haeckelia comb jellies pass cnidocysts from their stomach down tentacular canals, to line their tentacles for use in capturing prey. This is reported in all species but H. filigera, where the process has not been described.

Most flatworms capable of kleptocnidy have cells called cyst cells or cnidophages to deliver nematocysts from their digestive tract to their epidermis for defense.

Nudibranchs capable of kleptocnidy have branched digestive glands and have cerata that are tipped with cnidosacs, such that cnidocysts are passed directly from digestion to their cnidosacs for use. To protect themselves from nematocysts firing in their digestive tract, aeolid nudibranchs have a hard cuticle lining their esophagus and have a mucus that chemically inhibits nematocyst discharge and while providing an additional barrier. These nudibranchs use the cnidocysts for defense and capturing prey.

== Occurrence ==
Kleptocnidy has evolved independently in various marine animals, including ctenophores, acoels, flatworms, and molluscs. Below is a table outlining the various occurrences of kleptocnidy, given by Goodheart et al., with the addition of the representatives of the process for some of the taxa

Phylum	Order	Number of species	Representative(s)	Inferred number of origins
Ctenophora	Cydippida	3	Haeckelia rubra, H. bimaculata, H. beehleri	1
Acoelomorpha	Acoela	1	Childia dubium	1
Platyhelminthes	Catenulida	1	Stenostomum sieboldi	6–13
Platyhelminthes	Macrostomorpha	12	Microstomum spp.	6–13
Platyhelminthes	Proseriata	5	Archimonocelis spp.	6–13
Platyhelminthes	Prolecithophora	4	Ulianinia mollissima, U. westbladi, Pseudostomum klostermanni, Cylindrostoma monotrochum	6–13
Platyhelminthes	Polycladida	9	Stylochoplana tarda, S. inquilina, Anonymus, Chromoplana bella, Amakusaplana acroporae, Amyella, Theama sp.	6–13
Platyhelminthes	Rhabdocoela	1	Wahlia macrostylifera	6–13
Mollusca	Nudibranchia	~600	Aeolidida, Hancockia spp.	1–2

Aeolidida is the primary clade in Nudibranchia that perform kleptocnidy, though there are a few in the unplaced genus Hancockia that can as well. Kleptocnidy occurs in a range of Platyhelminthes.

== See also ==
- Cnidocyte
- Cnidosac
- Kleptoplasty
- Kleptoprotein
