= M. luteola =

M. luteola may refer to:

- Macrorrhyncha luteola, a species of fly
- Malephora luteola, a species of plant
- Massilia luteola, a species of bacteria
- Maladera luteola, a species of beetle
- Metalasia luteola, a species of plant
- Metasphaeria luteola, a species of fungus
- Miconia luteola, a species of plant
- Microchirita luteola, a species of plant
- Minictena luteola, a species of comb jelly
- Minilimosina luteola, a species of fly
- Mitrula luteola, a species of fungus
- Mocyta luteola, a species of beetle
- Mollisia luteola, a species of fungus
- Monarda luteola, a species of plant
- Mycena luteola, a species of fungus
- Myrmica luteola, a species of ant
