= Tinerfe cyanea =

Scientific classification
- Domain: Eukaryota
- Kingdom: Animalia
- Phylum: Ctenophora
- Class: Tentaculata
- Order: Cydippida
- Family: Cydippidae
- Genus: Tinerfe; Chun, 1898
- Species: T. cyanea

Binomial name
- Tinerfe cyanea (Chun, 1889)

Synonyms
- Tinerfe coerulea Chun

Genus of comb jellies

Tinerfe is a genus of ctenophores belonging to the family Cydippidae.

There is one species recognized in this genus, Tinerfe cyanea. Two others were previously placed in the genus and moved to other genera: Haeckelia beehleri and Lampea lactea. Another species, T. coerulea, was synonimized to T. cyanea.
