= Lampea lactea =

Scientific classification
- Domain: Eukaryota
- Kingdom: Animalia
- Phylum: Ctenophora
- Class: Tentaculata
- Order: Cydippida
- Family: Lampeidae
- Genus: Lampea
- Species: L. lactea

Binomial name
- Lampea lactea Mayer, 1912

Species of comb jelly

Lampea lactea is a species of comb jelly in the family Cydippidae and the genus Lampea.
