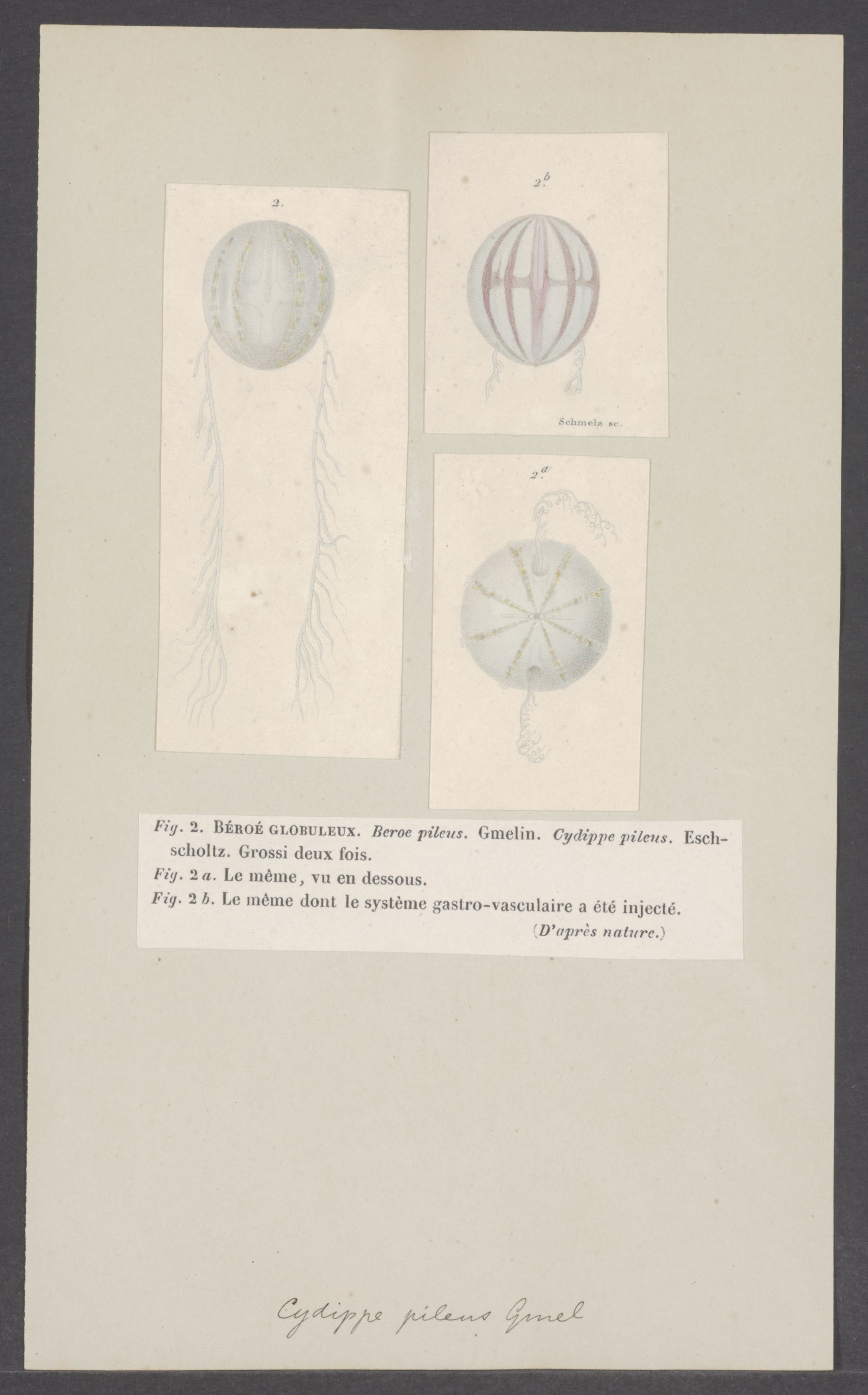
- Cydippe pileus

Scientific classification
- Kingdom: Animalia
- Phylum: Ctenophora
- Class: Tentaculata
- Order: Cydippida
- Family: Cydippidae
- Genus: Cydippe; Eschscholtz, 1829

= Cydippe (ctenophore) =

Genus of comb jellies

Cydippe is a genus of ctenophores belonging to the order Cydippida, family unassigned.

The species of this genus are found in Europe.

Species:

- Cydippe densa Forskål, 1775
- Cydippe hormiphora Gegenbaur, 1856
- Cydippe ovata Lesson, 1843
