= Hormiphora hormiphora =

Scientific classification
- Domain: Eukaryota
- Kingdom: Animalia
- Phylum: Ctenophora
- Class: Tentaculata
- Order: Cydippida
- Family: Cydippidae
- Genus: Hormiphora
- Species: H. hormiphora

Binomial name
- Hormiphora hormiphora (Gegenbaur, 1856)

Synonyms
- Cydippe densa Spagnolini, 1870; Cydippe hormiphora Gegenbaur, 1856; Cydippe plumosa M. Sars, 1859; Hormiphora plumosa (M. Sars, 1859)

Species of ctenophore

Hormiphora hormiphora is a species of comb jelly in the family Cydippidae. The body is pear-shaped and lacks lateral compression, with ciliary comb rows that are uniform in length. These rows begin some distance below the aboral pole and reach two-thirds of the way towards the mouth. Tentacle sheaths are closely pressed to the stomodeum. The elongated tentacles possess two varieties of slightly yellowish tentilla, and there is a cock-shaped expansion on the upper side of the base.
