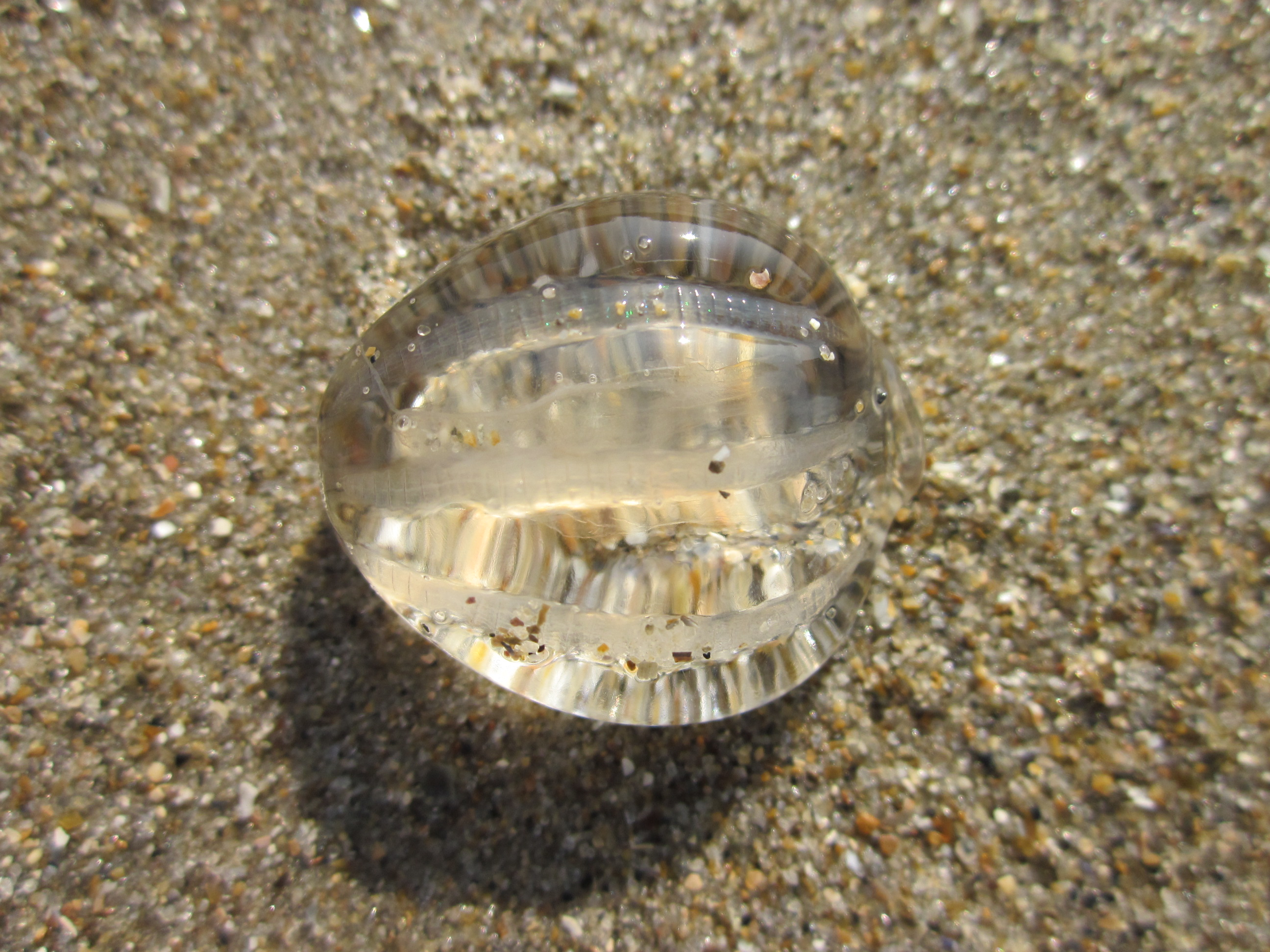
- Washed up on the beach

Scientific classification
- Kingdom: Animalia
- Phylum: Ctenophora
- Class: Tentaculata
- Order: Cydippida
- Family: Cydippidae
- Genus: Pleurobrachia
- Species: P. pileus

Binomial name
- Pleurobrachia pileus (O. F. Müller, 1776)

= Pleurobrachia pileus =

Species of comb jelly

Pleurobrachia pileus is a species of comb jelly, commonly known as a sea gooseberry. It is found in open water in the northern Atlantic Ocean, the North Sea, the Baltic Sea and the Black Sea, and was first described by the Danish zoologist Otto Friedrich Müller in 1776.

== Description ==
Pleurobrachia pileus is a small, globular or ovoid comb jelly up to about 2.5 cm (1 in) in length. It has a pair of long tentacles that are used to catch prey and can be retracted into sheaths. The tentacles are up to twenty times the length of the body and are fringed with filaments along one edge. The body bears four pairs of longitudinal rows of cilia known as combs which extend about three quarters the length of the animal between its mouth and its aboral (opposite) end.

It is the beating of the cilia in synchrony that allows the animal to swim and that gives it an iridescent appearance. The body is transparent and the comb rows milky white. The tentacles, sheaths and pharynx are also milky white, or dull orange in some individuals.

== Distribution ==
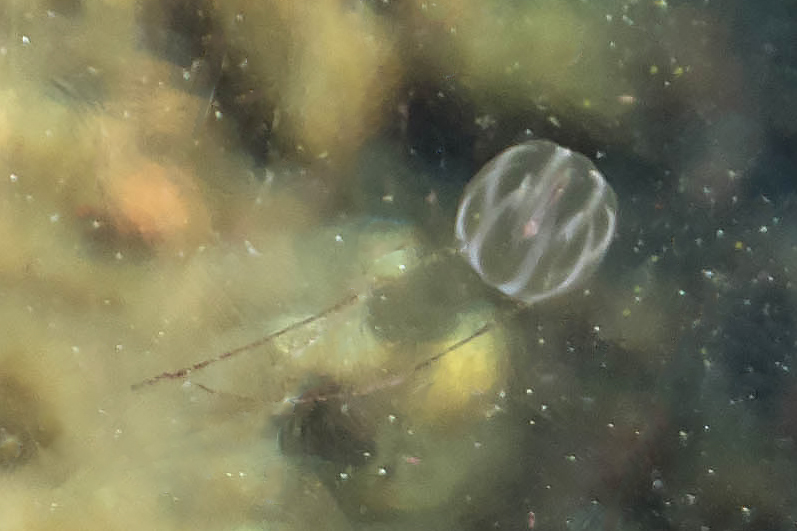
P. pileus in Gullmarn fjord, Sweden

Pleurobrachia pileus occurs in the northern Atlantic Ocean and along the northwestern coasts of Europe. Its range includes the Baltic Sea, the Skagerrak, the Kattegat and the North Sea. It is a pelagic species, occurring in open water, but is sometimes found in rock pools or washed up on the beach. It also occurs off the eastern Atlantic coasts of North America, and in the Black Sea.

This comb jelly is common around the coasts of Europe in early summer. The populations in the Baltic Sea are dependent on the inflow of saline water from the North Sea.

== Ecology ==
P. pileus swimming and displaying the iridescence of their beating cilia.

Pleurobrachia pileus is a predator and feeds on such actively swimming prey as gammarid amphipods, crab zoeal larvae, barnacle cyprid larvae and calanoid copepods. Over much of its range it co-exists with another species of comb jelly, Bolinopsis infundibulum. The two species are found not to compete for food as their feeding habits differ. P. pileus remains motionless while it snares larger prey with its long tentacles, whereas B. infundibulum draws in a feeding current of water and filters out the smaller, more weakly swimming, tiny zooplankton.

In the North Sea, P. pileus makes large daily vertical migrations as do its main copepod prey. They spend the night in upper waters, usually just below the thermocline, descending to deep waters between 80 and 150 metres (260 and 490 ft) in the early morning, and rising again in late afternoon. These migrations do not take place in the winter and at this period, P. pileus remains close to the sediment, often with a cessation of movement of the combs of cilia. This change in behaviour may be due to the scarcity of prey in the water column at this time of year. When on or near the sediment, this comb jelly is preyed upon by crustaceans such as the hermit crab Pagurus bernhardus, the crab Carcinus maenas and the shrimp Crangon crangon.
