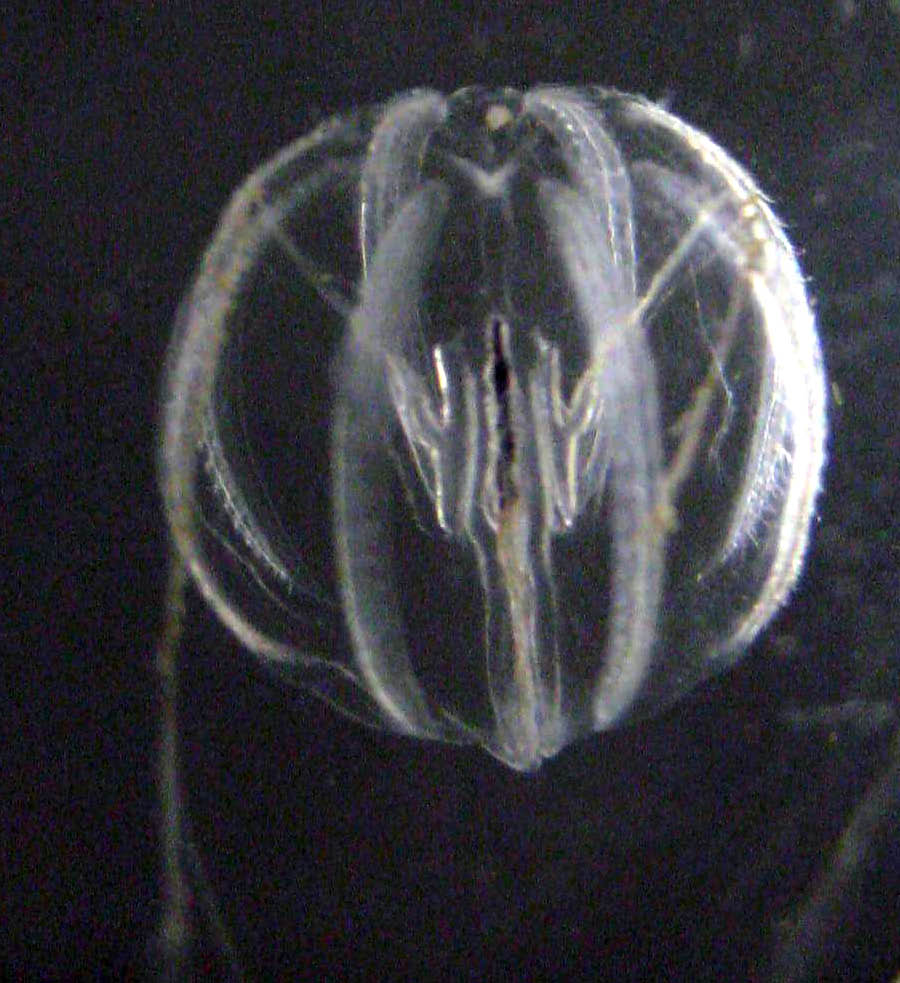
- Pleurobrachia bachei with its oral end down.

Scientific classification
- Kingdom: Animalia
- Phylum: Ctenophora
- Class: Tentaculata
- Order: Cydippida
- Family: Cydippidae
- Genus: Pleurobrachia
- Species: P. bachei

Binomial name
- Pleurobrachia bachei A. Agassiz, 1860

= Pleurobrachia bachei =

Species of comb jelly

Pleurobrachia bachei is a member of the phylum Ctenophora and is commonly referred to as the Pacific sea gooseberry. These comb jellies are often mistaken for medusoid Cnidaria, but lack stinging cells.

== Morphology ==
An individual sea gooseberry's body length can reach up to 20 mm (0.79 in) with each of the two tentacles stretching 150 mm (5.9 in). Their gelatinous globular bodies are composed of 99% water. They have eight rows of well-developed comb plates consisting of thousands of fused macrocilia controlled by an apical organ. Unlike most other ctenophores, Pleurobrachia lacks a conventional photoprotein and is therefore incapable of producing light. Their bodies are virtually transparent and the many cilia refract the light, producing rainbow-like colors that can give the false appearance of bioluminescence. The branched tentacles can be white, yellow, pink or orange. They have no nematocysts (stinging cells). Instead, the two long extensile branched tentacles are armed with colloblasts: specialized adhesive cells with which to ensnare their prey.

Their mitochondrial genome consist of only 12 genes.

== Lifespan ==
The sea gooseberry is only alive for around 4–6 months.

== Reproduction ==
Pleurobrachia lack any sessile (attached) stages and are wholly planktonic in their life cycle. They are self-fertile hermaphrodites that spawn eggs and sperm freely into the sea, and develop thereafter without any parental protection with indirect development.

== Feeding ==
=== Foraging behavior ===
Pleurobrachia bachei is a selective carnivore and its feeding habits are analogous to other ambush "sit and wait" predators, such as the orb-weaving spider. When searching for prey the Pleurobrachia swims with its oral pole forward to set its tentacles. To allow the two main tentacles and numerous lateral tentilla to relax and expand behind it they are often in a curved or helical pathway. Once the tentacles are set, the ctenophore drifts passively. Occasionally, it will retract its tentacles to varying degrees into the sheaths before swimming to another location where it then resets them. This behavior appears to be regulated by its hunger level and can be construed as an attempt to find an area with more prey abundance.

When handling prey both tentacles contract and carry the prey to the mouth. This is achieved by several rapid rotations of the body which swipes the tentacle bearing the food across the oral region. The Pleurobrachia has its oral end opposite of where its tentacles originate.

=== Trophic strategy ===
Sea gooseberries are insatiable feeders of copepods and other small plankton, rarely fish eggs and larvae. It has been shown that their prey is more susceptible at an early age (naupliar/larval stages) because of minimal swimming speeds and small size which makes handling more efficient. This generalization is not necessarily true for all Pleurobrachia. In one experiment the ctenophore favored adult Pseudocalanus minutus more than other forms of zooplankton.

== Ecology and distribution ==
=== Geographic range ===
P. bachei is found along the West coast of North America from Southeast Alaska to Mexico.

=== Habitat ===
The sea gooseberry occurs primarily in surface waters of the coastal NW Pacific within 5 km of shore to about 50 m deep, though is usually in the upper 15 m during the day.

== Conservation ==
=== Conservation status ===
Pleurobrachia bachei has not been evaluated by the International Union for Conservation of Nature (IUCN), but seems to be prevalent and is not considered threatened.

== Economic importance for humans ==
=== Negative ===
Although Pleurobrachia has not been associated with declines in other populations, a closely related species Mnemiopsis leidyi has. This ctenophore had catastrophic effects on fish catches after its introduction into the Black and Azov Seas. It is believed to have been the main cause of decline in these waters after dissection confirmed its stomach contents had large quantities of the local fish eggs and larvae. Because of their diets Pleurobrachia and other ctenophore species can directly or indirectly affect trophic cascades and ultimately regulate yield of commercially important fish stocks.

=== Positive ===
As predators, ctenophores have a tremendous capacity to regulate abundance of their prey and therefore help to balance an ecosystem. While they can decimate other populations they can also restrain an overabundance of copepods which, when left to their own devices, could virtually eliminate all phytoplankton from the water column.
