= Euplokamis dunlapae =

Scientific classification
- Kingdom: Animalia
- Phylum: Ctenophora
- Class: Tentaculata
- Order: Cydippida
- Family: Euplokamididae
- Genus: Euplokamis
- Species: E. dunlapae

Binomial name
- Euplokamis dunlapae Mills, 1987

Species of ctenophore

Euplokamis dunlapae is a marine species of ctenophore. It is the first species of ctenophora reported to have giant axons controlling the comb rows. They control the ciliary beating, allowing for rapid change in the speed and direction of the cilia, likely evolved as an escape mechanism.
