= Hormiphora cucumis =

Scientific classification
- Domain: Eukaryota
- Kingdom: Animalia
- Phylum: Ctenophora
- Class: Tentaculata
- Order: Cydippida
- Family: Cydippidae
- Genus: Hormiphora
- Species: H. cucumis

Binomial name
- Hormiphora cucumis Mertens, 1833

Species of comb jelly

Hormiphora cucumis is a species of comb jelly in the family Cydippidae.
