= Euplokamis evansae =

Scientific classification
- Domain: Eukaryota
- Kingdom: Animalia
- Phylum: Ctenophora
- Class: Tentaculata
- Order: Cydippida
- Family: Euplokamididae
- Genus: Euplokamis
- Species: E. evansae

Binomial name
- Euplokamis evansae Zeidler & Davie, 2010

Ctenophore marine species

Euplokamis evansae is a marine species of ctenophore.

== Distribution ==
The species is currently assumed to occur in Tasmanian waters.
