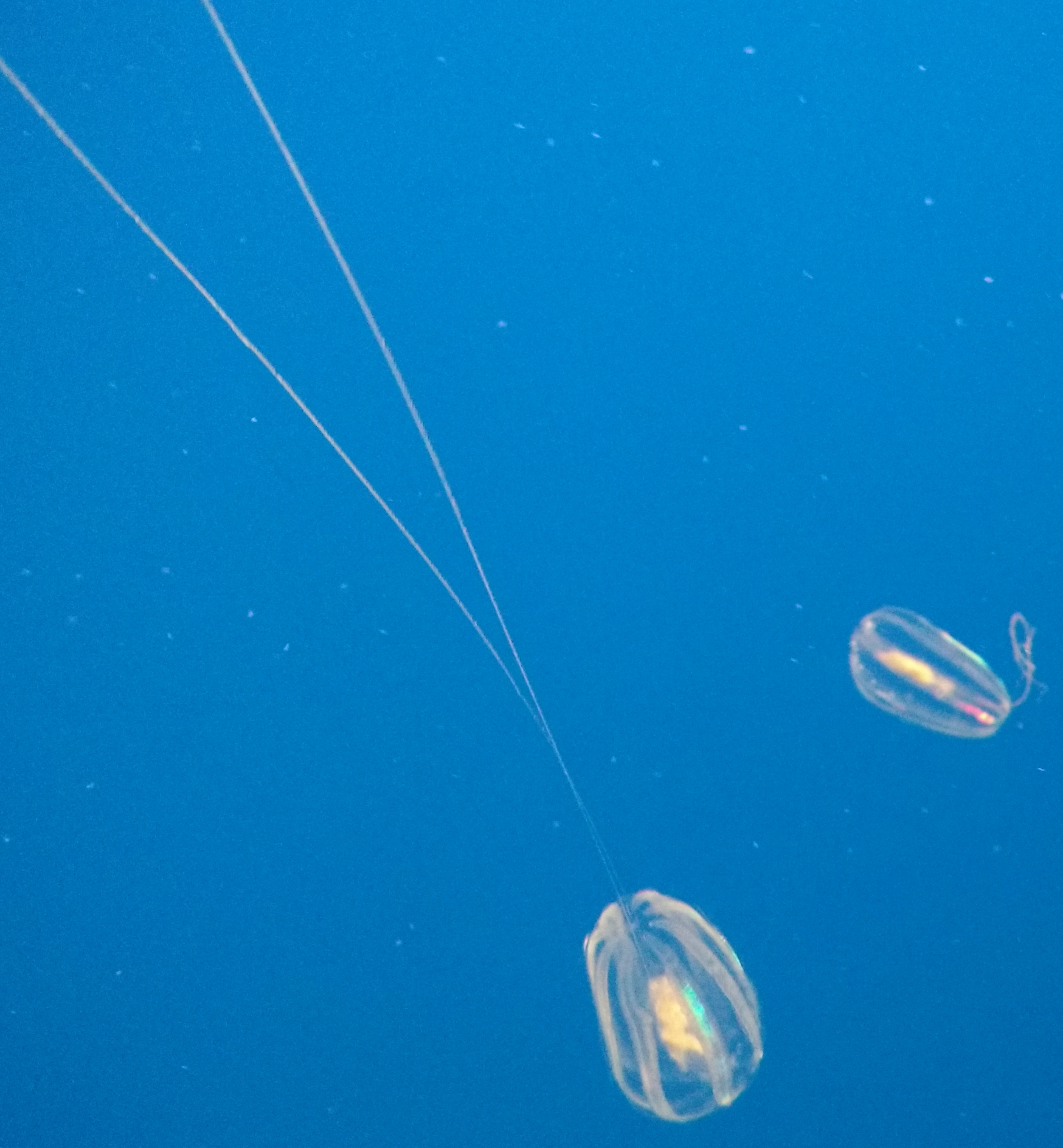

Scientific classification
- Kingdom: Animalia
- Phylum: Ctenophora
- Class: Tentaculata
- Order: Cydippida
- Family: Cydippidae
- Genus: Hormiphora
- Species: H. californensis

Binomial name
- Hormiphora californensis (Torrey, 1904)

= Hormiphora californensis =

Species of comb jelly

Hormiphora californensis is a species of comb jelly in the family Cydippidae. Called the California sea gooseberry, is a comb jelly, or ctenophore, common in California coastal waters. Ctenophores have eight sets of cilia running down their side, which they use to propel themselves through the oceans in search of food.
