= Euplokamis helicoides =

Scientific classification
- Domain: Eukaryota
- Kingdom: Animalia
- Phylum: Ctenophora
- Class: Tentaculata
- Order: Cydippida
- Family: Euplokamididae
- Genus: Euplokamis
- Species: E. helicoides

Binomial name
- Euplokamis helicoides (Ralph and Kaberry, 1950)

Synonyms
- Pleurobrachia helicoides

Species of comb jelly

Euplokamis helicoides is a species of marine ctenophore. It has been reported to be a fast swimmer.

== Distribution ==
The species occurs in the South Pacific Ocean and New Zealand.
