= Euplokamis stationis =

Scientific classification
- Domain: Eukaryota
- Kingdom: Animalia
- Phylum: Ctenophora
- Class: Tentaculata
- Order: Cydippida
- Family: Euplokamididae
- Genus: Euplokamis
- Species: E. stationis

Binomial name
- Euplokamis stationis (Chun, 1879)

Marine species of ctenophores

Euplokamis stationis is a marine species of ctenophores. It was named after a zoological station in Naples, Italy.

== Description ==
Chun described the species as being 2.5cm long and 1.3cm wide in the main axis.

== Distribution ==
The species occurs the Mediterranean Sea.
