= Euchloridae =

Scientific classification
- Kingdom: Animalia
- Phylum: Ctenophora
- Class: Tentaculata
- Order: Cydippida
- Family: Euchloridae

Family of sponges

Euchloridae is a family of sponges belonging to the order Cydippida.

Genera:

- Euchlora Chun, 1880
