= Euplokamis octoptera =

Scientific classification
- Domain: Eukaryota
- Kingdom: Animalia
- Phylum: Ctenophora
- Class: Tentaculata
- Order: Cydippida
- Family: Euplokamididae
- Genus: Euplokamis
- Species: E. octoptera

Binomial name
- Euplokamis octoptera (Mertens, 1833)

Marine species of ctenophores

Euplokamis octoptera is a marine species of ctenophore. It was described as "likely to be Mertensia ovum", but it was moved to Euplokamis by Mills in 1987.

== Distribution ==
The species occurs in the North Atlantic Ocean.
