= Attenboroughctena =

Scientific classification
- Kingdom: Animalia
- Phylum: Ctenophora
- Class: Tentaculata
- Order: Cydippida
- Family: Cydippidae
- Genus: Attenboroughctena; Ceccolini & Cianferoni, 2020
- Species: A. bicornis

Binomial name
- Attenboroughctena bicornis (C. Carré & D. Carré, 1991)

Genus of comb jelly

Attenboroughctena is a genus of comb jellies of the family Cydippidae. The genus was proposed by Ceccolini & Cianferoni, 2020. The only species is Attenboroughctena bicornis.
