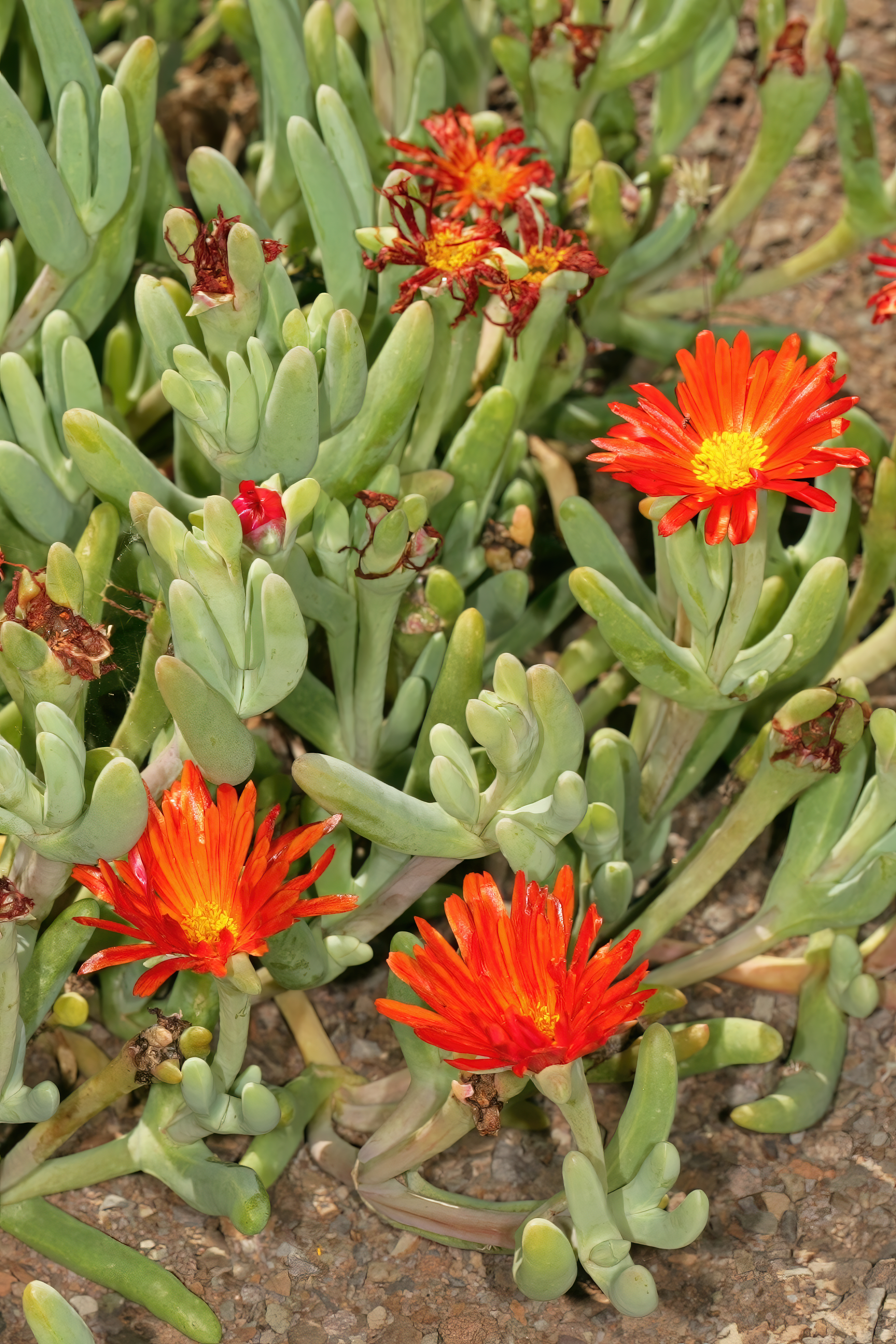

Scientific classification
- Kingdom: Plantae
- Clade: Embryophytes
- Clade: Tracheophytes
- Clade: Angiosperms
- Clade: Eudicots
- Order: Caryophyllales
- Family: Aizoaceae
- Genus: Malephora
- Species: M. purpureocrocea

Binomial name
- Malephora purpureocrocea (Haw.) Schwantes

Synonyms
- Crocanthus purpureocroceus (Haw.) L.Bolus; Mesembryanthemum purpureocroceum Haw.; Hymenocyclus purpureocroceus L.Bolus; Mesembryanthemum insititium Willd.

= Malephora purpureocrocea =

Species of flowering plant

Malephora purpureocrocea is a species of plant in the family Aizoaceae (stone plants), native to the Cape Provinces of South Africa. It differs from Malephora crocea by a purplish colour at the lower surface of the petals (reddish in M. crocea). Closely related to Malephora crocea which has a reddish colour at the lower surface of the petals in contrast to a violet-purple one in M. purpureocrocea. Some authors considered the two species as varieties or subspecies. It is the second most successful naturalised species in Maltese natural habitats within the Aizoaceaa species after Carpobrotus acinaciformis. A large population the size of 100 x 50m is found at the Cumnija area in Mellieha, near the sewage treatment plant.

== Sources ==
This article incorporates text from a free content work. Licensed under CC0 (license statement/permission). Text taken from "Malephora purpureo-crocea", Encyclopedia of Life.
