= Euplokamis crinita =

Scientific classification
- Kingdom: Animalia
- Phylum: Ctenophora
- Class: Tentaculata
- Order: Cydippida
- Family: Euplokamididae
- Genus: Euplokamis
- Species: E. crinita

Binomial name
- Euplokamis crinita (Moser, 1909)

Synonyms
- Pleurobrachia crinita Moser, 1909

Marine species of ctenophore

Euplokamis crinita is a marine species of ctenophore. This species was first described by Fanny Moser in 1909 and originally named Pleurobrachia crinita. The tentacles of the species have been reported to be smaller. This resulted in the species being argued to be in the genus Pleurobrachia, however according to WORMS, it stays in Euplokamis.

== Distribution ==
The species occurs in the Northwestern Atlantic Ocean and Arctic Ocean.
