= Planula =

Larval form of certain aquatic animals

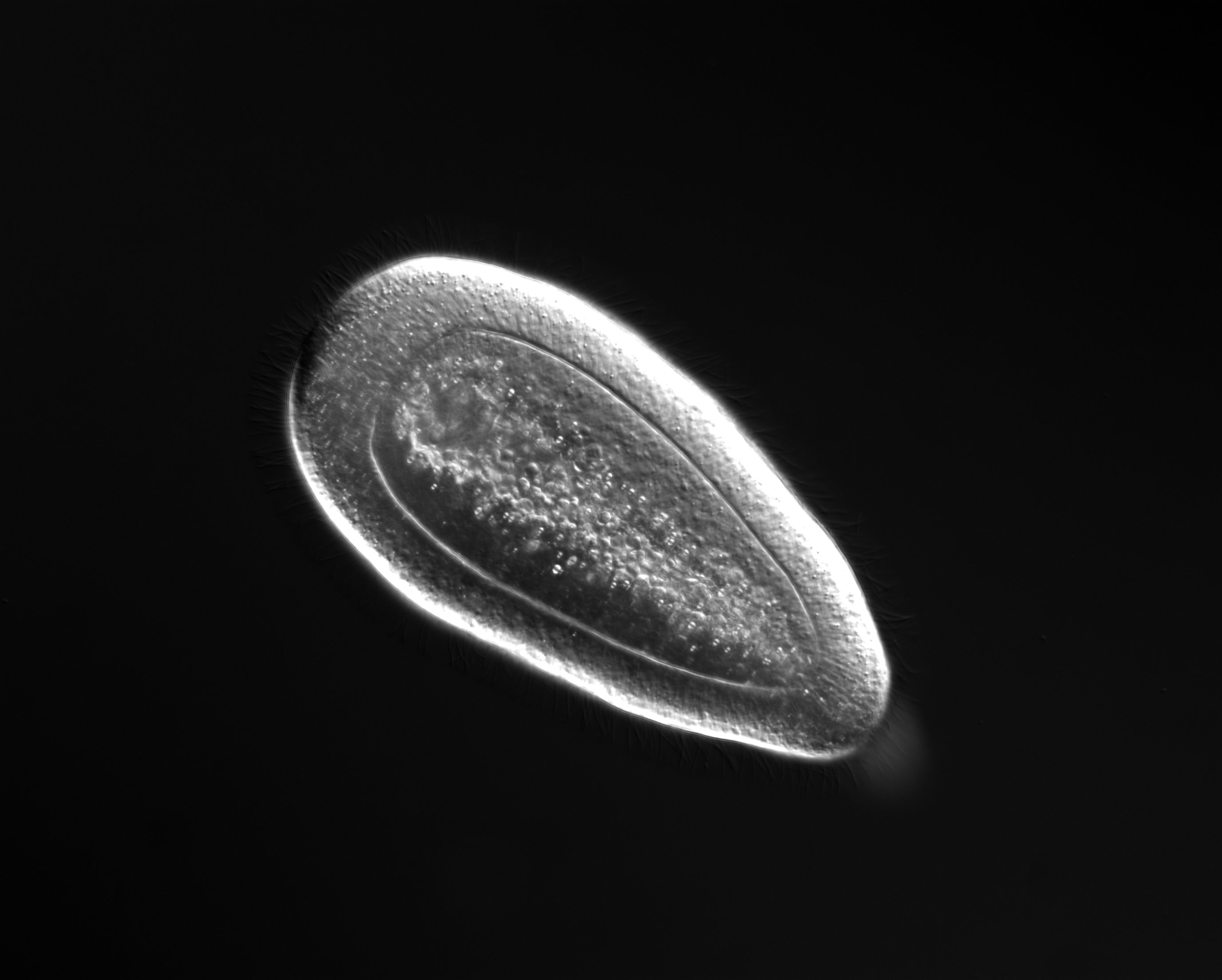
Planula stage of Clytia hemisphaerica

A planula is the free-swimming, flattened, ciliated, bilaterally symmetric larval form of various cnidarian species and some species of ctenophores (such as in genus Lampea), which are not closely related to cnidarians. Some groups of nemerteans also produce larvae that are very similar to the planula, which are called planuliform larva. In a few cnidarian clades, like Aplanulata and the parasitic Myxozoa, the planula larval stage has been lost.

== Development ==
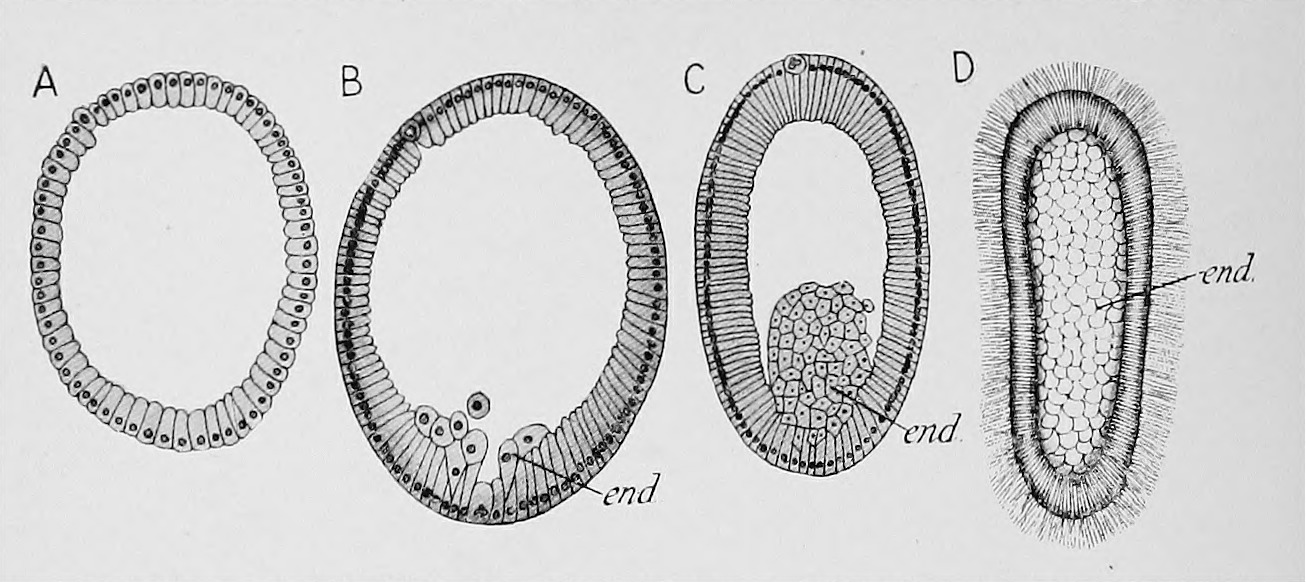
Four stages in the development of the planula of Clytia, from left to right: blastula stage (A), formation of the endoderm (B), endoderm half-filling the cavity of the blastula (C), and free-swimming planula larva (D)

The planula forms either from the fertilized egg of a medusa, as is the case in scyphozoans and some hydrozoans, or from a polyp, as in the case of anthozoans.

Depending on the species, the planula either metamorphoses directly into a free-swimming, miniature version of the mobile adult form, or navigates through the water until it reaches a hard substrate (many may prefer specific substrates) where it anchors and grows into a polyp. The miniature-adult types include many open-ocean scyphozoans. The attaching types include all anthozoans with a planula stage, many coastal scyphozoans, and some hydrozoans.

== Feeding and locomotion ==
The planulae of the subphylum Medusozoa have no mouth, and no digestive tract, and are unable to feed themselves (lecithotrophic), while those of Anthozoa show more variation and can be both lecithotrophic, parasitic or feed on plankton or detritus.

Planula larvae swim with the aboral end (the end opposite the mouth) in front.
