= Malephora herrei =

Scientific classification
- Kingdom: Plantae
- Clade: Tracheophytes
- Clade: Angiosperms
- Clade: Eudicots
- Order: Caryophyllales
- Family: Aizoaceae
- Genus: Malephora
- Species: M. herrei

Binomial name
- Malephora herrei (Schwantes) Schwantes

Synonyms
- Hymenocyclus herrei Schwantes

Species of plant

Malephora herrei is a small succulent plant that is part of the Aizoaceae family. The species is endemic to South Africa and occurs in the Northern Cape, Eastern Cape and the Free State.
