= Malephora mollis =

Scientific classification
- Kingdom: Plantae
- Clade: Tracheophytes
- Clade: Angiosperms
- Clade: Eudicots
- Order: Caryophyllales
- Family: Aizoaceae
- Genus: Malephora
- Species: M. mollis

Binomial name
- Malephora mollis (Aiton) N.E.Br.

Synonyms
- Corpuscularia mollis (Aiton) Schwantes; Mesembryanthemum molle Aiton

Species of plant

Malephora mollis is a small succulent plant that is part of the Aizoaceae family. The species is endemic to South Africa and occurs in the Eastern Cape and the Western Cape.
