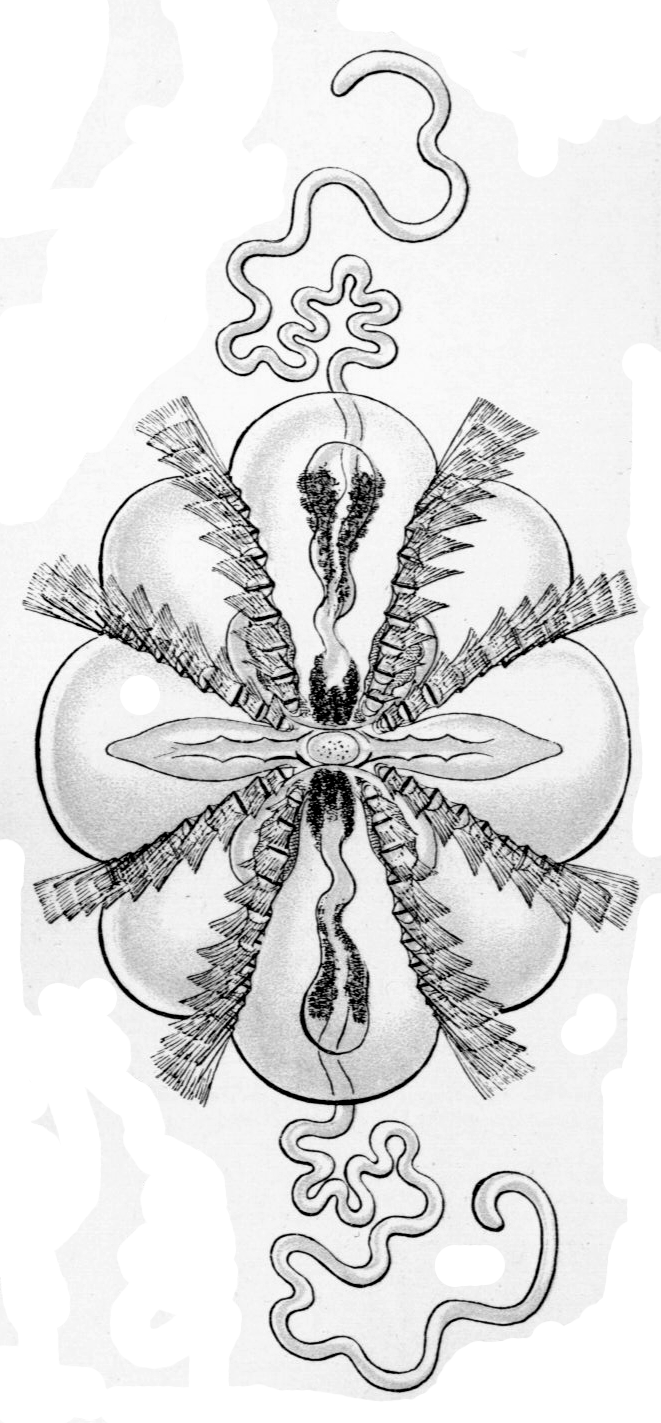
- Haeckelia rubra

Scientific classification
- Kingdom: Animalia
- Phylum: Ctenophora
- Class: Tentaculata
- Order: Cydippida
- Family: Haeckeliidae; Krumbach, 1925
- Genus: Haeckelia; Carus, 1863

Synonyms
- Chlorella Stechow, 1921; Owenia Kölliker, 1853

= Haeckelia =

Genus of ctenophores

Haeckelia is a genus of ctenophores belonging to the family Cydippida.

The species of this genus are found in Europe and Northern America.

Members of the genus Haeckelia, which feed mainly on jellyfish, perform kleptocnidy and incorporate their victims' stinging cnidocytes into their own tentacles.

The following species are recognized in this genus:

- Haeckelia beehleri (Mayer, 1912)
- Haeckelia bimaculata Carré & Carré, 1989
- Haeckelia filigera (Chun, 1880)
- Haeckelia rubra (Kölliker, 1853)
