= Bathyctena =

Scientific classification
- Kingdom: Animalia
- Phylum: Ctenophora
- Class: Tentaculata
- Order: Cydippida
- Family: Bathyctenidae
- Genus: Bathyctena

Genus of comb jellies

Bathyctenidae is a family of ctenophores belonging to the order Cydippida. The family consists of only one genus: Bathyctena Mortensen, 1932.

== Taxonomy ==
- Family Bathyctenidae Mortensen, 1913 (2)
  - Genus Bathyctena Mortensen, 1912 (2)
    - Species Bathyctena chuni (Moser, 1909)
    - Species Bathyctena latipharyngea (Dawydoff, 1946)
