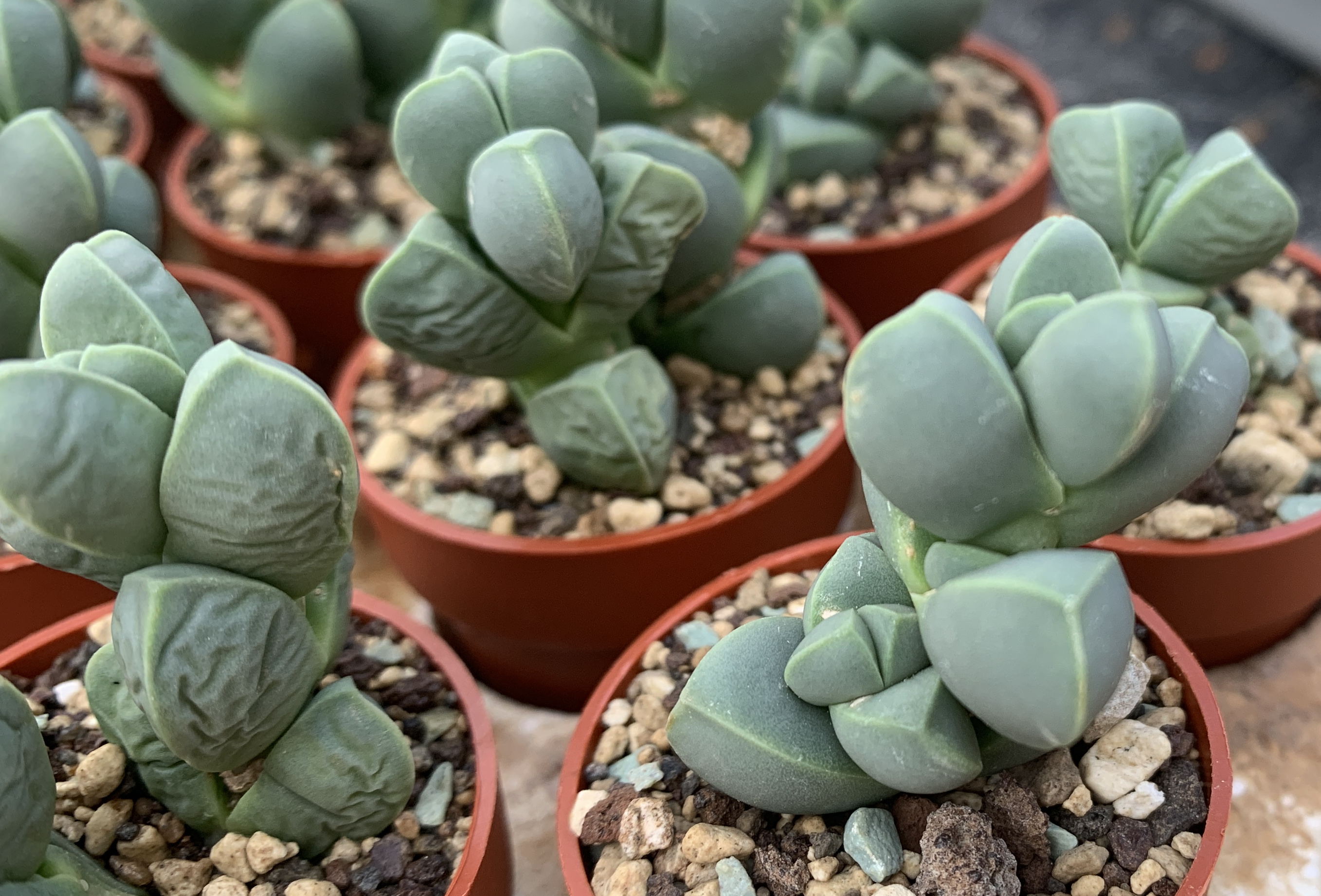

Scientific classification
- Kingdom: Plantae
- Clade: Tracheophytes
- Clade: Angiosperms
- Clade: Eudicots
- Order: Caryophyllales
- Family: Aizoaceae
- Genus: Malephora
- Species: M. thunbergii

Binomial name
- Malephora thunbergii (Haw.) Schwantes

Synonyms
- Corpuscularia thunbergii (Haw.) Schwantes; Crocanthus thunbergii (Haw.) L.Bolus; Hymenocyclus thunbergii L.Bolus; Mesembryanthemum corniculatum Eckl. & Zeyh.; Mesembryanthemum laeve Thunb.; Mesembryanthemum spectabile Eckl. & Zeyh.; Mesembryanthemum thunbergii Haw.

= Malephora thunbergii =

Species of plant

Malephora thunbergii is a small succulent plant that is part of the Aizoaceae family. The species is endemic to South Africa and occurs in the Eastern Cape.
