= Cryptocoda =

Scientific classification
- Kingdom: Animalia
- Phylum: Ctenophora
- Class: Tentaculata
- Order: Cydippida
- Family: Cryptocodidae; Leloup, 1938
- Genus: Cryptocoda; Leloup, 1938
- Species: C. gerlachi

Binomial name
- Cryptocoda gerlachi Leloup, 1938

Genus of comb jellies

Cryptocodidae is a family of ctenophores belonging to the order Cydippida. The family consists of only one genus: Cryptocoda and the only species in this genus is Cryptocoda gerlachi.
