= Malephora engleriana =

Scientific classification
- Kingdom: Plantae
- Clade: Tracheophytes
- Clade: Angiosperms
- Clade: Eudicots
- Order: Caryophyllales
- Family: Aizoaceae
- Genus: Malephora
- Species: M. engleriana

Binomial name
- Malephora engleriana (Dinter & A.Berger) Dinter & Schwantes

Species of plant

Malephora engleriana is a small succulent plant that is part of the Aizoaceae family. The species is endemic to Namibia.
