= Malephora latipetala =

Scientific classification
- Kingdom: Plantae
- Clade: Tracheophytes
- Clade: Angiosperms
- Clade: Eudicots
- Order: Caryophyllales
- Family: Aizoaceae
- Genus: Malephora
- Species: M. latipetala

Binomial name
- Malephora latipetala (L.Bolus) H.Jacobsen & Schwantes

Synonyms
- Hymenocyclus latipetalus L.Bolus

Species of plant

Malephora latipetala is a small succulent plant that is part of the Aizoaceae family. The species is endemic to South Africa and occurs in the Western Cape.
