= Malephora ochracea =

Scientific classification
- Kingdom: Plantae
- Clade: Tracheophytes
- Clade: Angiosperms
- Clade: Eudicots
- Order: Caryophyllales
- Family: Aizoaceae
- Genus: Malephora
- Species: M. ochracea

Binomial name
- Malephora ochracea (A.Berger) H.E.K.Hartmann

Synonyms
- Glottiphyllum ochraceum (A.Berger) N.E.Br.; Mesembryanthemum ochraceum A.Berger

Species of plant

Malephora ochracea is a small succulent plant that is part of the Aizoaceae family. The species is endemic to South Africa and occurs in the Eastern Cape and the Western Cape.
