= Benthic comb jelly =

Comb jelly found in the Ryukyu Trench near Japan

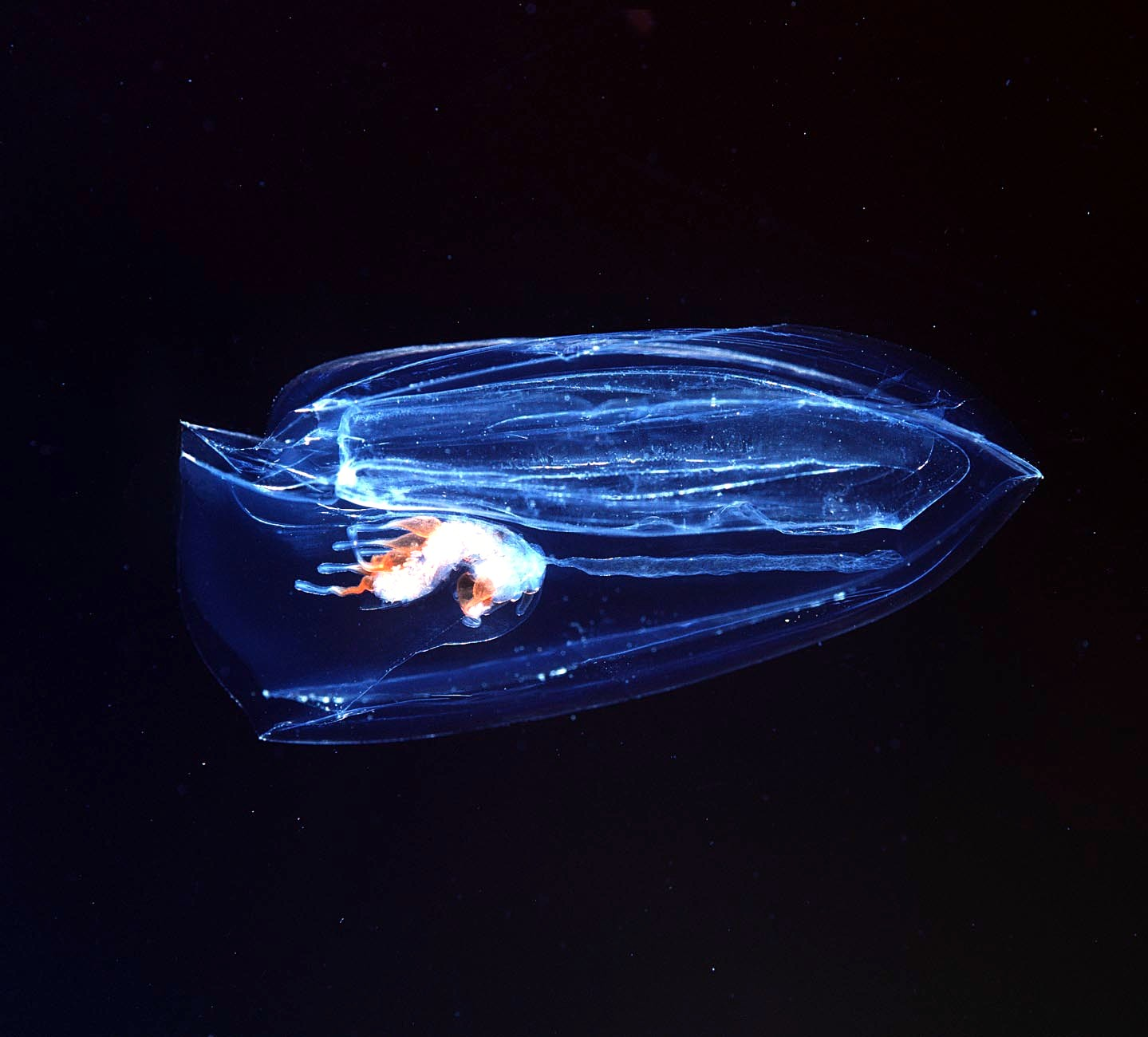
The benthic comb jelly belongs to the group of comb jellies. They get their name from their jelly-like structure and their comb-like bands of cilia.

The benthic comb jelly is a comb jelly living in the Ryukyu Trench near Japan. Found at a depth of 7,217 metres (23,700 ft), it is the deepest dwelling ctenophore discovered. Since its discovery, similar comb jellies have been found in the New Britain and Yap trenches.

== Description ==
The benthic comb jelly is a gelatinous organism 5–8 cm wide and 10–20 cm long. It can attach itself to the sea floor using two long filaments and has two retractable tentacles at the opposite end. Its appearance has been said to resemble a two-tailed box kite. Their pair of long branched tentacles are most likely for entangling their prey and retracting the prey back into the sac in their body.

== Discovery ==
The Benthic comb jelly was discovered off the coast of Japan at the Ryukyu Trench. It was observed by the remotely operated underwater vehicle Kaikō on a dive into the Ryukyu Trench in April 2002, but the video and images of this unique bottom dwelling ctenophore remained "undiscovered" until several years later. During April 2006, scientists from the Census of Marine Zooplankton observed a number of rare deep-sea ctenophores, which led to a re-examination of the cydippid ctenophore taxonomy and the suggestion that there be two new families of cydippid ctenophore. Due to several taxonomic affinities, researchers considered this species for inclusion in the genus Aulacoctena. However, it also displayed differences from that genus, so it may need to be placed in a new genus. The specimens were not brought to the surface and in any event, appear fragile and might not withstand the changes of pressure involved.

== Diet ==
Many questions have arisen about the availability of food for the benthic comb jelly. Previously, it was thought the abyssal depths of deep sea trenches, such as this one, could not support predators that actively hunt macroscopic food sources (as opposed to sessile predators, which do not hunt). This led some to believe that there is missing information about the area's ecosystem. However, characterizing the habitat and food source of benthic comb jellies and its "role in shaping the assemblage distribution pattern remains challenging, due to limited access to extreme deep ecosystems and the paucity of sample points obtained within the hadal zone". Because they are exclusively marine they likely are planktonic like most comb jellies.
