= Vampyroctena =

Scientific classification
- Kingdom: Animalia
- Phylum: Ctenophora
- Class: Tentaculata
- Order: Cydippida
- Family: Vampyroctenidae; Townsend, Damian-Serrano & Whelan, 2020
- Genus: Vampyroctena; Townsend, Damian-Serrano & Whelan, 2020
- Species: V. delmarvensis

Binomial name
- Vampyroctena delmarvensis Townsend, Damian-Serrano & Whelan, 2020

Monospecific family of comb jellies

Vampyroctenidae is a family of ctenophores belonging to the order Cydippida. The family consists of only one genus: Vampyroctena and the only species in this genus is Vampyroctena delmarvensis.
