= Malephora flavocrocea =

Scientific classification
- Kingdom: Plantae
- Clade: Tracheophytes
- Clade: Angiosperms
- Clade: Eudicots
- Order: Caryophyllales
- Family: Aizoaceae
- Genus: Malephora
- Species: M. flavocrocea

Binomial name
- Malephora flavocrocea (Haw.) H.Jacobsen & Schwantes

Synonyms
- Hymenocyclus flavocroceus (Haw.) Schwantes ex H.Jacobsen; Mesembryanthemum purpureocroceum var. flavocroceum Haw.

Species of plant

Malephora flavocrocea is a small succulent plant that is part of the Aizoaceae family. The species is endemic to South Africa and occurs in the Northern Cape.
