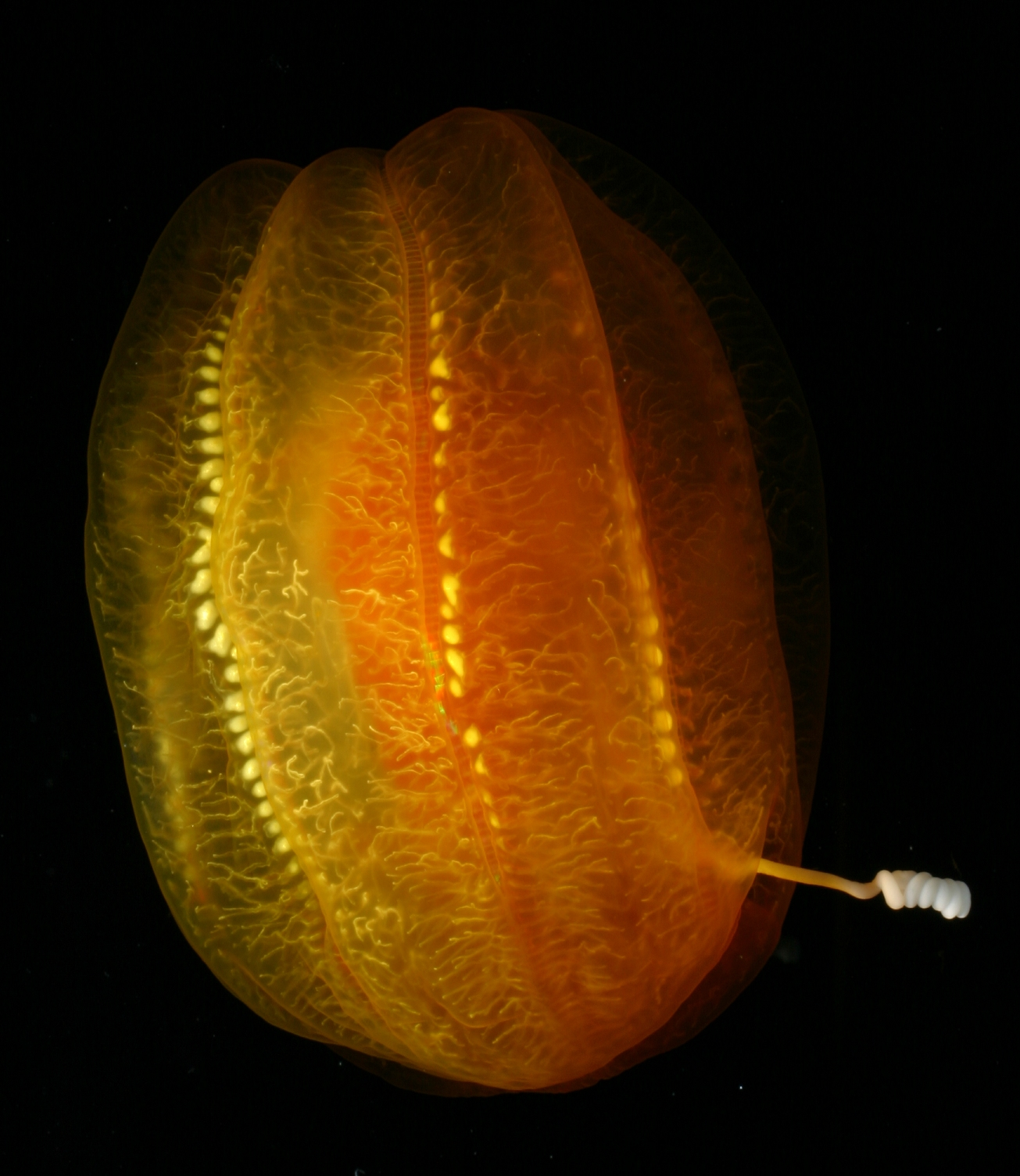

Scientific classification
- Kingdom: Animalia
- Phylum: Ctenophora
- Class: Tentaculata
- Order: Cydippida
- Family: Aulacoctenidae; Lindsay & Miyake, 2007
- Genus: Aulacoctena; Mortensen, 1932
- Species: A. acuminata

Binomial name
- Aulacoctena acuminata Mortensen, 1932

= Aulacoctena =

Genus of ctenophores

Aulacoctena is a monotypic genus of ctenophores belonging to the monotypic family Aulacoctenidae. The only species is Aulacoctena acuminata.
