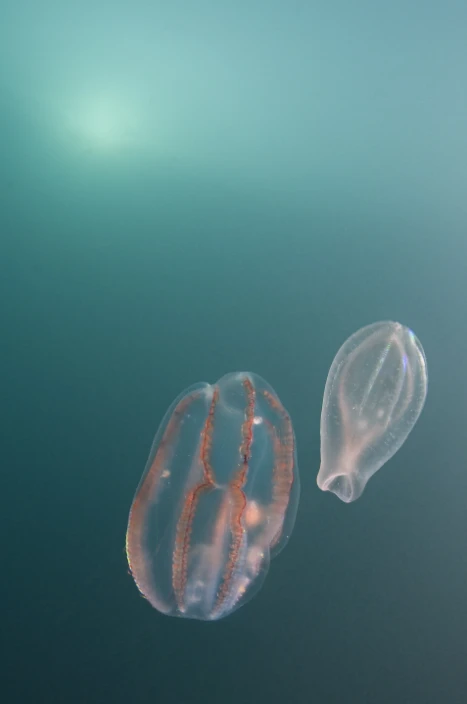

Scientific classification
- Kingdom: Animalia
- Phylum: Ctenophora
- Class: Tentaculata
- Order: Cydippida
- Family: Dryodoridae; Harbison, 1996
- Genus: Dryodora; L. Agassiz, 1860
- Species: D. glandiformis

Binomial name
- Dryodora glandiformis (Mertens, 1833)

= Dryodora =

Genus of comb jellies

Dryodoridae is a family of ctenophores belonging to the order Cydippida. The family consists of only one genus: Dryodora Agassiz, 1860. and a single species Dryodora glandiformis.
