= Lampea (ctenophore) =

Scientific classification
- Kingdom: Animalia
- Phylum: Ctenophora
- Class: Tentaculata
- Order: Cydippida
- Family: Lampeidae
- Genus: Lampea; Stechow, 1921

Genus of comb jellies

Lampea is a genus of ctenophores belonging to the family Lampeidae.

The genus has almost cosmopolitan distribution.

Species:

- Lampea elongata (Quoy & Gaimard, 1824)
- Lampea fusiformis (Agassiz & Mayer, 1902)
- Lampea komai (Dawydoff, 1937)
- Lampea lactea (Mayer, 1912)
- Lampea pancerina (Chun, 1879)

== Parasitism ==
The species Lampea pancerina is the only known parasitic comb jelly. The female lays its eggs on tunicates and its larvae (Théel larvae) were attached to Tunicates.
