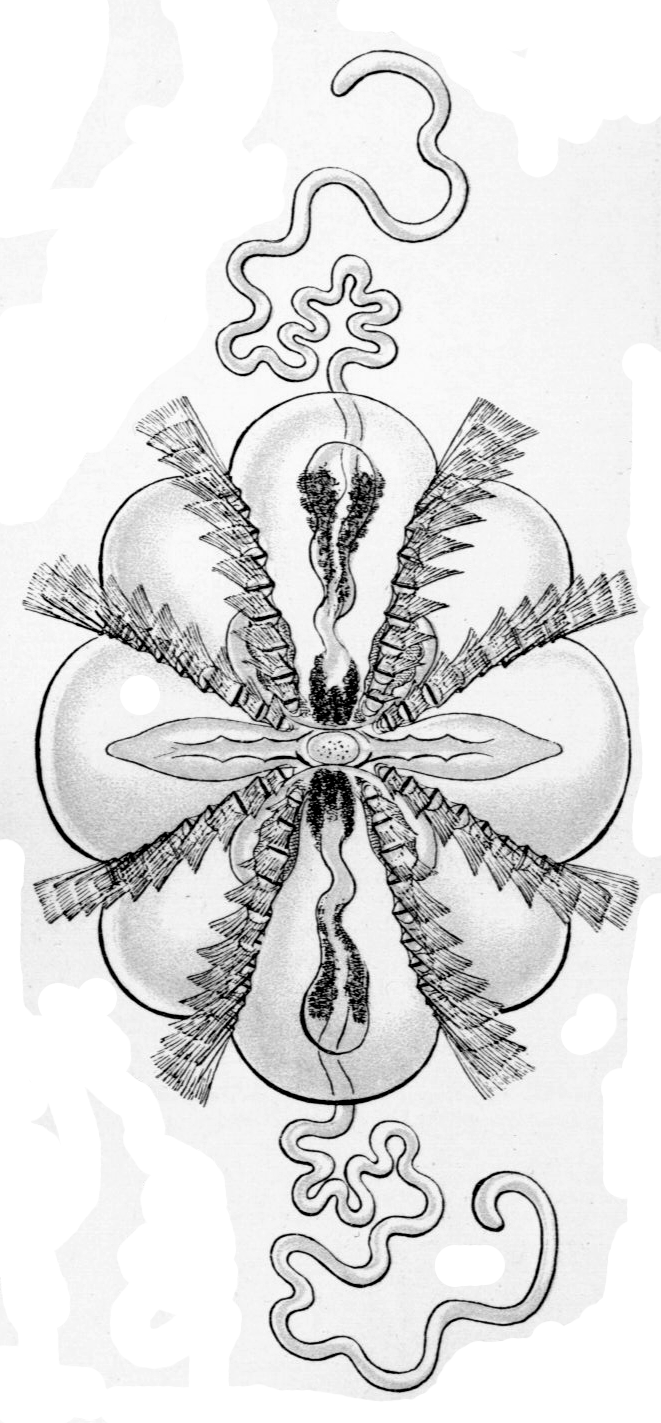
- Haeckelia rubra

Scientific classification
- Kingdom: Animalia
- Phylum: Ctenophora
- Class: Tentaculata
- Order: Cydippida
- Family: Haeckeliidae
- Genus: Haeckelia
- Species: H. rubra

Binomial name
- Haeckelia rubra Kölliker, 1853

Synonyms
- Chlorella rubra (Kölliker, 1853); Euchlora rubra (Kölliker, 1853); Owenia filigera Kölliker, 1853; Owenia rubra Kölliker, 1853

= Haeckelia rubra =

Species of jelly

Haeckelia rubra is a species of comb jelly in the family Haeckeliidae. Haeckelia rubra is a species of Ctenophores that have tentacles but lack Colloblast Cells, otherwise known as Lasso Cells. Instead they contain Nematocysts.
