= Ctenella aurantia =

Scientific classification
- Domain: Eukaryota
- Kingdom: Animalia
- Phylum: Ctenophora
- Class: Tentaculata
- Order: Cydippida
- Family: Ctenellidae; C. Carré & D. Carré, 1993
- Genus: Ctenella; C. Carré & D. Carré, 1993
- Species: C. aurantia

Binomial name
- Ctenella aurantia C. Carré & D. Carré, 1993

Monospecific family of comb jellies

Ctenellidae is a family of ctenophores belonging to the order Cydippida. The family consists of only one genus: Ctenella and the only species in this genus is Ctenella aurantia.
