= Malephora framesii =

Scientific classification
- Kingdom: Plantae
- Clade: Tracheophytes
- Clade: Angiosperms
- Clade: Eudicots
- Order: Caryophyllales
- Family: Aizoaceae
- Genus: Malephora
- Species: M. framesii

Binomial name
- Malephora framesii (L.Bolus) H.Jacobsen & Schwantes

Synonyms
- Hymenocyclus framesii L.Bolus

Species of plant

Malephora framesii is a small succulent plant that is part of the Aizoaceae family. The species is endemic to South Africa and occurs in the Northern Cape and Western Cape, from Hondeklip Bay to Saldanha Bay.
