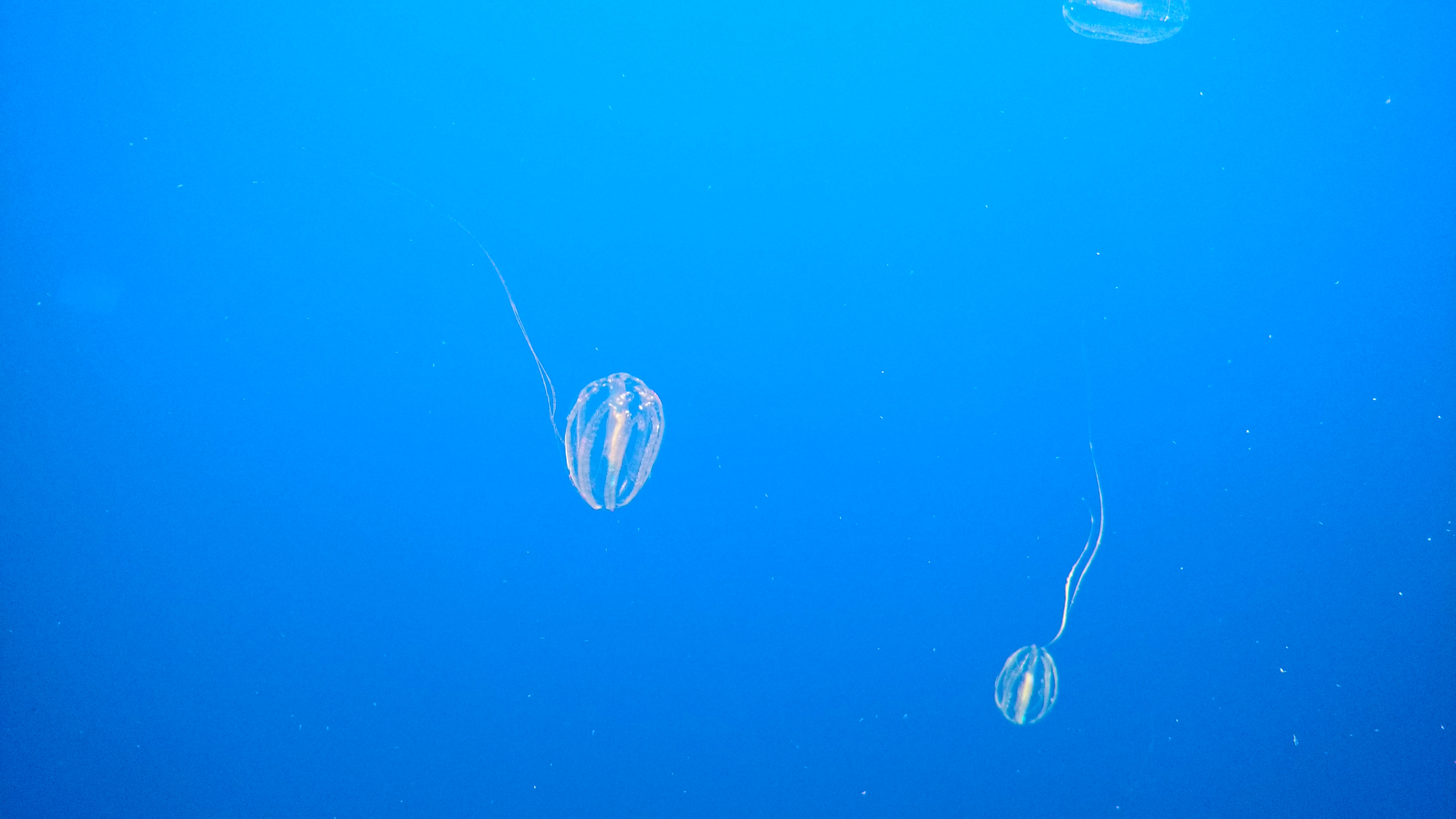
- Hormiphora californiensis

Scientific classification
- Kingdom: Animalia
- Phylum: Ctenophora
- Class: Tentaculata
- Order: Cydippida
- Family: Cydippidae
- Genus: Hormiphora; Louis Agassiz, 1860

Synonyms
- Janira Oken, 1815

= Hormiphora =

Genus of jellies

Hormiphora is a genus of comb jellies of the family Cydippidae. The genus was erected by Louis Agassiz in 1860.

Nearly two dozen species are recognized:

- Hormiphora australis (Benham, 1907)
- Hormiphora californensis (Torrey, 1904)
- Hormiphora cilensis (Ghigi, 1909)
- Hormiphora cucumis (Mertens, 1833)
- Hormiphora elliptica (Eschscholtz, 1829)
- Hormiphora foliosa Haeckel, 1904
- Hormiphora hormiphora (Gegenbaur, 1856)
- Hormiphora luminosa Dawydoff, 1946
- Hormiphora ochracea (A. Agassiz & Mayer, 1902)
- Hormiphora octoptera (Mertens, 1833)
- Hormiphora palmata Chun, 1898
- Hormiphora piriformis Ghigi, 1909
- Hormiphora polytrocha Dawydoff, 1946
- Hormiphora punctata Moser, 1909
- Hormiphora sibogae Moser, 1903
- Hormiphora spatulata Chun, 1898
