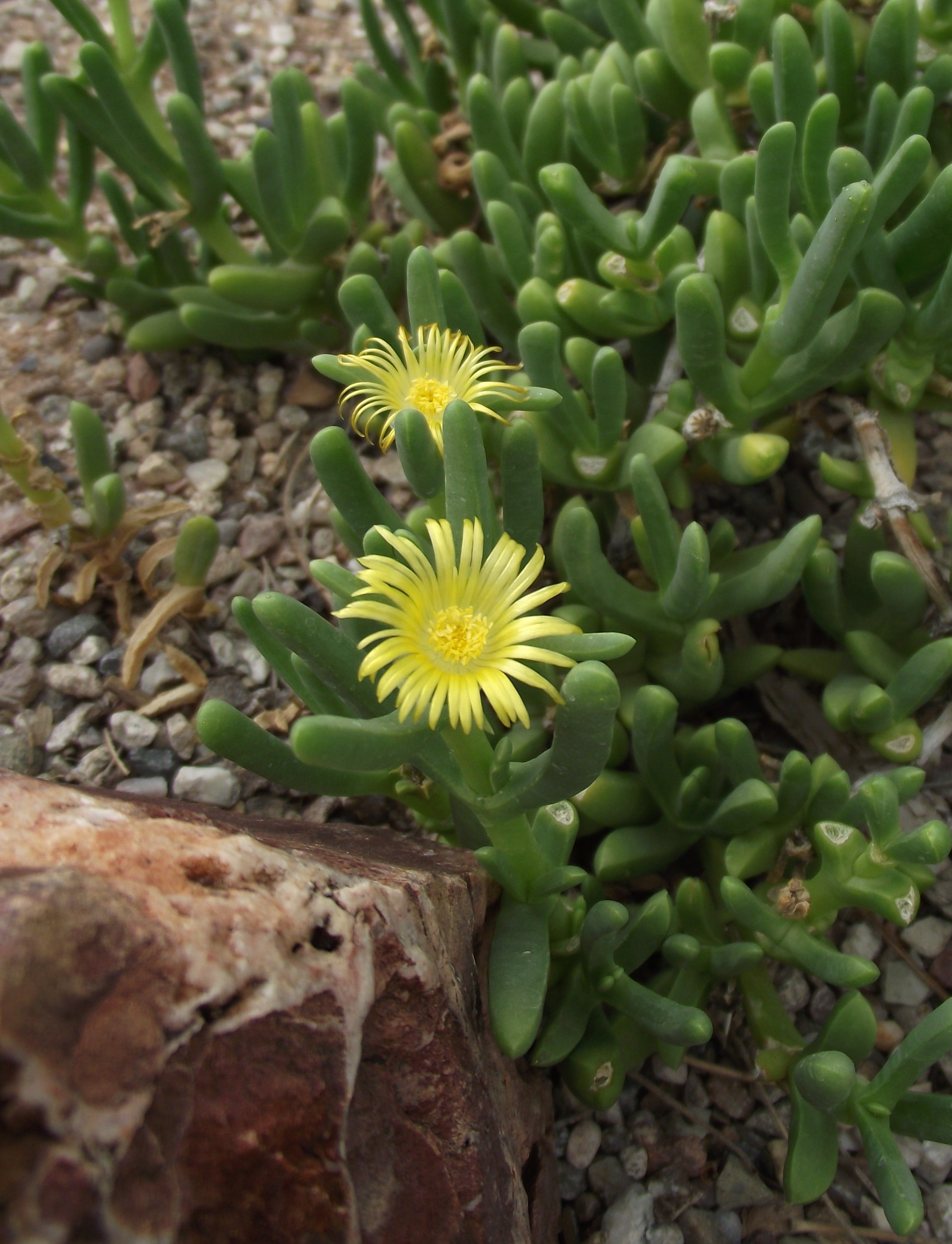

Scientific classification
- Kingdom: Plantae
- Clade: Tracheophytes
- Clade: Angiosperms
- Clade: Eudicots
- Order: Caryophyllales
- Family: Aizoaceae
- Genus: Malephora
- Species: M. lutea

Binomial name
- Malephora lutea (Haw.) Schwantes

Synonyms
- Mesembryanthemum luteum

= Malephora lutea =

Species of plant

Malephora lutea is a species of plants in the family Aizoaceae (stone plants). They are succulent plants. Flowers are visited by Fidelia kobrowi.

== Sources ==
This article incorporates text from a free content work. Licensed under CC0 (license statement/permission). Text taken from Malephora lutea. Encyclopedia of Life.
