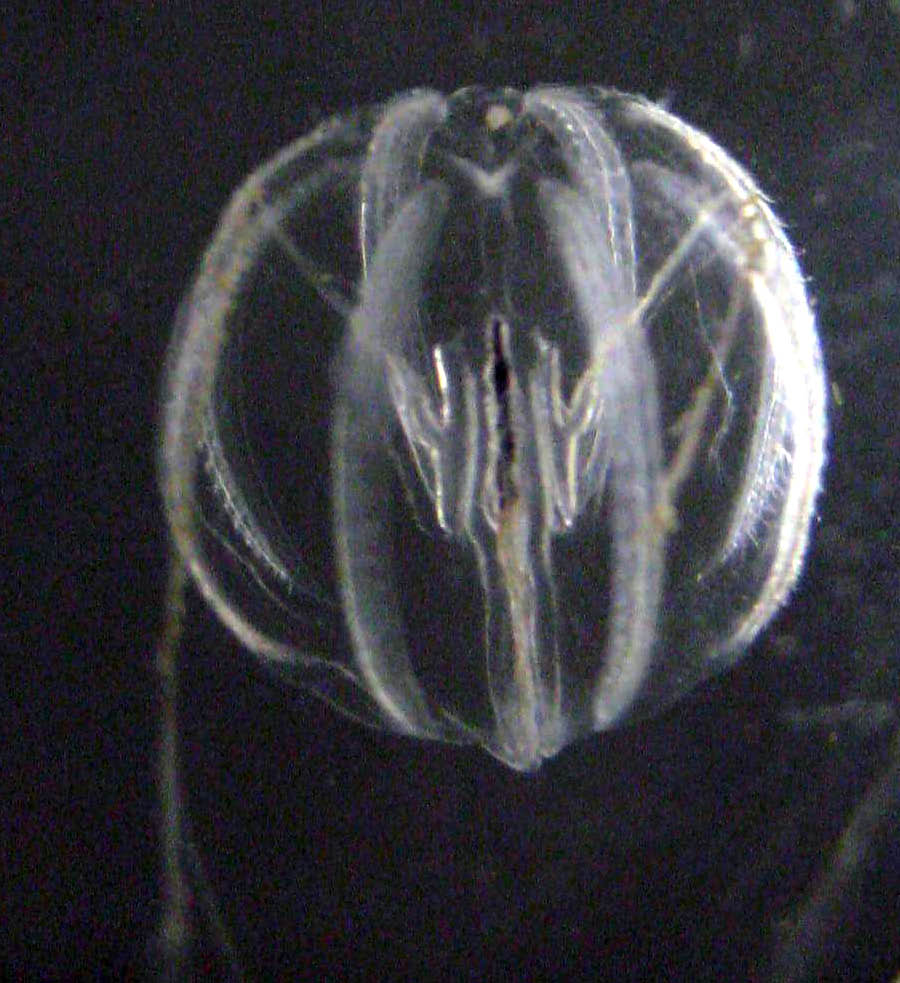
- Pleurobrachia bachei with its oral end down

Scientific classification
- Kingdom: Animalia
- Phylum: Ctenophora
- Class: Tentaculata
- Order: Cydippida
- Family: Cydippidae
- Genus: Pleurobrachia; Fleming, 1822

Type species
- Pleurobrachia pileus Müller, 1776

Species
- See text

Synonyms
- Moseria Ghigi, 1909; Cydippe Eschscholtz, 1829; Pleurobachia

= Pleurobrachia =

Genus of comb jellies

Sea Gooseberry

Pleurobrachia is a common genus of Ctenophora (an exclusively marine phylum). Along with the genus Hormiphora, it generally has the common name sea gooseberry. It contains the following species:

- Pleurobrachia arctica Wagner, 1885
- Pleurobrachia australis (Benham, 1907)
- Pleurobrachia bachei L. Agassiz, 1860
- Pleurobrachia brunnea Mayer, 1912
- Pleurobrachia dimidiata Eschscholtz, 1829
- Pleurobrachia globosa Moser
- Pleurobrachia pigmentata Moser, 1903
- Pleurobrachia pileus (Müller, 1776)
- Pleurobrachia rhododactyla L. Agassiz, 1860
- Pleurobrachia rhodopis Chun, 1880
- Pleurobrachia striata Moser
