= Malephora verruculoides =

Scientific classification
- Kingdom: Plantae
- Clade: Tracheophytes
- Clade: Angiosperms
- Clade: Eudicots
- Order: Caryophyllales
- Family: Aizoaceae
- Genus: Malephora
- Species: M. verruculoides

Binomial name
- Malephora verruculoides (Sond.) Schwantes

Synonyms
- Hymenocyclus veruculoides L.Bolus; Mesembryanthemum verruculoides Sond.

Species of plant

Malephora verruculoides is a small succulent plant that is part of the Aizoaceae family. The species is endemic to South Africa and occurs in the Northern Cape.
