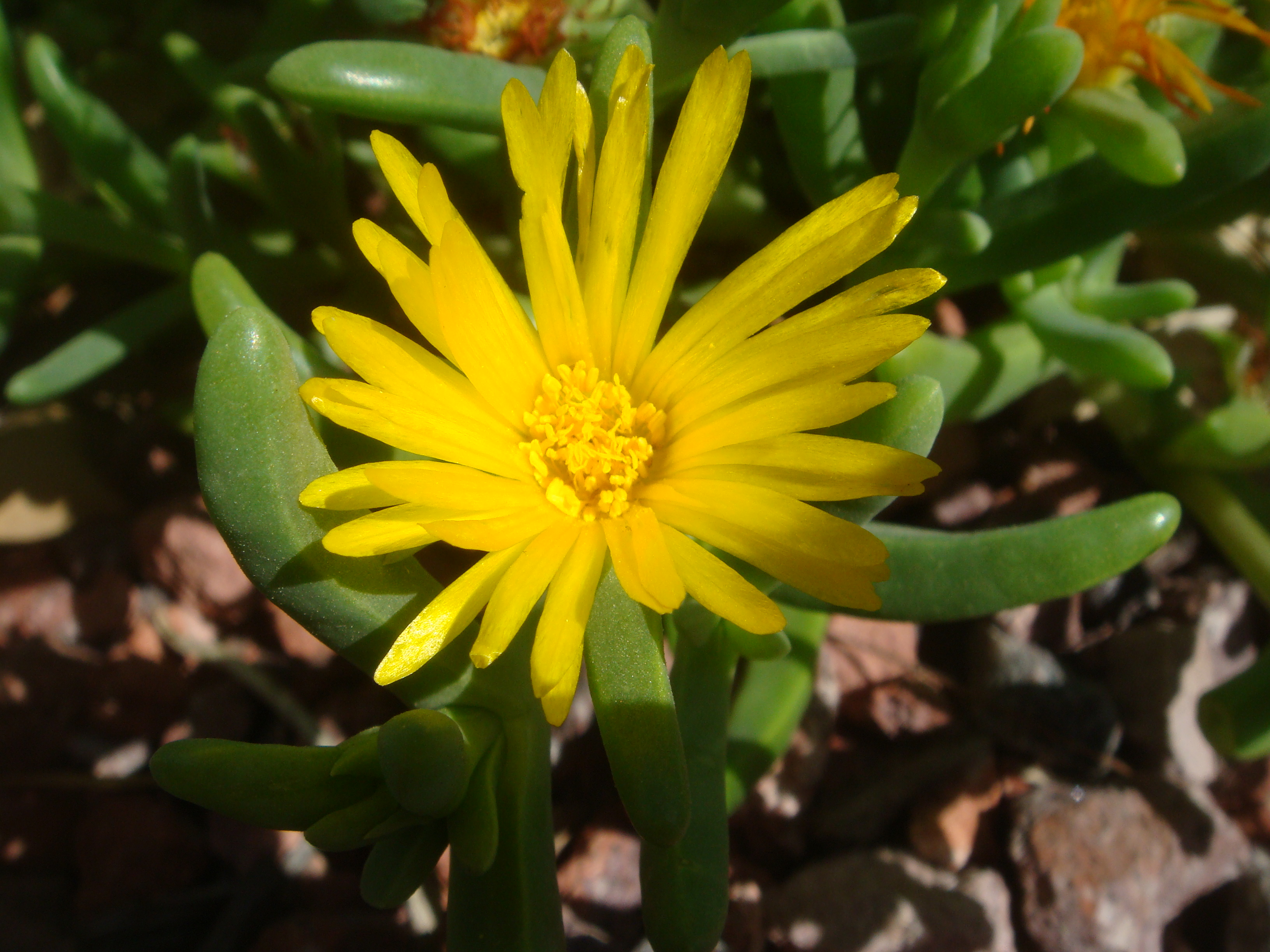
- Malephora luteola

Scientific classification
- Kingdom: Plantae
- Clade: Tracheophytes
- Clade: Angiosperms
- Clade: Eudicots
- Order: Caryophyllales
- Family: Aizoaceae
- Subfamily: Ruschioideae
- Tribe: Ruschieae
- Genus: Malephora; N.E.Br.

Species
- See text

Synonyms
- Crocanthus L.Bolus; Hymenocyclus Dinter & Schwantes

= Malephora =

Genus of succulents

Malephora is a genus of succulent plants in the ice plant family. There are 13 to 17 species in the genus, many of which are known commonly as mesembs. They are native to Namibia and the Cape Provinces and Free State of South Africa. During the apartheid era, South African scientists used it to create a chemical poison.

These are perennial herbs used as groundcovers lined with fleshy, smooth, sometimes waxy leaves no more than 6 centimetres (2.4 in) long. Leaves are triangular or rounded in cross-section and are arranged oppositely about the stem. The tubular flowers arise from leaf axils or at the ends of stem branches. The flowers may be several centimetres wide. They have up to 65 narrow petals in bright shades of yellow, orange, pink or purple. The center of the flower has whorls of up to 150 stamens. The fruit is a capsule that opens when it becomes wet, releasing the many seeds.

Some species are used as ornamental plants, particularly Malephora crocea.

== Species ==
17 species are accepted.

- Malephora crassa (L.Bolus) H.Jacobsen & Schwantes
- Malephora crocea (Jacq.) Schwantes – orange flowers
- Malephora engleriana (Dinter & A.Berger) Dinter & Schwantes
- Malephora flavocrocea (Haw.) H.Jacobsen & Schwantes
- Malephora framesii (L.Bolus) H.Jacobsen & Schwantes
- Malephora herrei (Schwantes) Schwantes
- Malephora latipetala (L.Bolus) H.Jacobsen & Schwantes
- Malephora lutea (Haw.) Schwantes
- Malephora luteola (Haw.) Schwantes – Rocky Point ice plant - yellow flowers
- Malephora mollis (Aiton) N.E.Br.
- Malephora ochracea (A.Berger) H.E.K.Hartmann
- Malephora pienaarii van Jaarsv.
- Malephora purpureocrocea (Haw.) Schwantes – purple flowers
- Malephora smithii (L.Bolus) H.E.K.Hartmann
- Malephora thunbergii (Haw.) Schwantes
- Malephora uitenhagensis (L.Bolus) H.Jacobsen & Schwantes
- Malephora verruculoides (Sond.) Schwantes
