= Pukia =

Scientific classification
- Kingdom: Animalia
- Phylum: Ctenophora
- Class: Tentaculata
- Order: Cydippida
- Family: Pukiidae; Gershwin, Zeidler & Davie, 2010
- Genus: Pukia; Gershwin, Zeidler & Davie, 2010

Genus of comb jellies

Pukia is a genus of ctenophores belonging to the order Cydippida. It is the only genus in the family Pukiidae.

There are two species in this genus:

- Pukia falcata Gershwin, Zeidler & Davie, 2010
- Pukia ohtsukai Lindsay, 2017
