= Minictena =

Scientific classification
- Kingdom: Animalia
- Phylum: Ctenophora
- Class: Tentaculata
- Order: Cydippida
- Family: Cydippidae
- Genus: Minictena; Carré & Carré, 1993
- Species: M. luteola

Binomial name
- Minictena luteola Carré & Carré, 1993

Monotypic genus of comb jellies

Minictena is a monotypic genus of comb jellies in the family Cydippidae. Its sole species is Minictena luteola. The genus and its sole species were described by Claude and Danièle Carré in 1993.
