= Haeckelia beehleri =

Scientific classification
- Domain: Eukaryota
- Kingdom: Animalia
- Phylum: Ctenophora
- Class: Tentaculata
- Order: Cydippida
- Family: Haeckeliidae
- Genus: Haeckelia
- Species: H. beehleri

Binomial name
- Haeckelia beehleri (Mayer, 1912)

Synonyms
- Tinerfe beehleri Mayer, 1912

Species of jelly

Haeckelia beehleri is a species of comb jelly in the family Haeckeliidae.
