= Lampeidae =

Scientific classification
- Kingdom: Animalia
- Phylum: Ctenophora
- Class: Tentaculata
- Order: Cydippida
- Family: Lampeidae

Family of comb jellies

Lampeidae is a family of ctenophores belonging to the order Cydippida.

Genera:

- Gastropodes
- Lampea (ctenophore) Stechow, 1921
- Lampetia Chun, 1880
