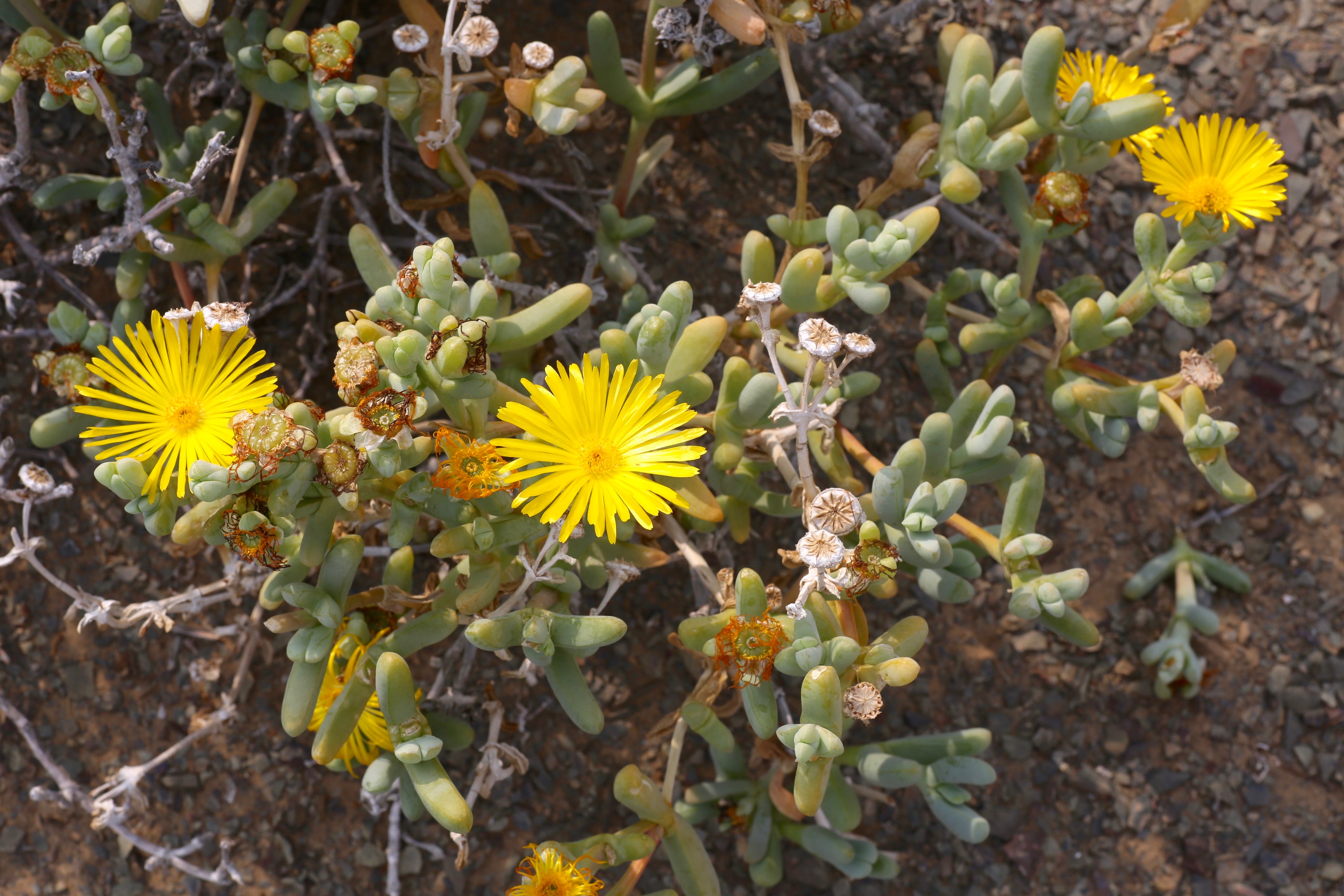

Scientific classification
- Kingdom: Plantae
- Clade: Tracheophytes
- Clade: Angiosperms
- Clade: Eudicots
- Order: Caryophyllales
- Family: Aizoaceae
- Genus: Malephora
- Species: M. luteola

Binomial name
- Malephora luteola (Haw.) Schwantes

Synonyms
- Crocanthus luteolus (Haw.) L.Bolus; Hymenocyclus luteolus Schwantes; Mesembryanthemum luteolum Haw.

= Malephora luteola =

Species of plant

Malephora luteola is a small succulent plant that is part of the Aizoaceae family. The species is endemic to South Africa and occurs in the Western Cape.
