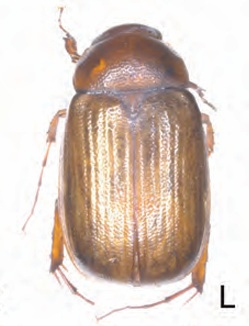

Scientific classification
- Kingdom: Animalia
- Phylum: Arthropoda
- Clade: Pancrustacea
- Class: Insecta
- Order: Coleoptera
- Suborder: Polyphaga
- Infraorder: Scarabaeiformia
- Family: Scarabaeidae
- Genus: Maladera
- Species: M. luteola

Binomial name
- Maladera luteola (Moser, 1918)

Synonyms
- Serica luteola Moser, 1918

= Maladera luteola =

Species of beetle

Maladera luteola is a species of beetle of the family Scarabaeidae. It is found in India (Karnataka, Madhya Pradesh, Tamil Nadu).

== Description ==
Adults reach a length of about 6.8 mm. They have a yellowish brown, oval body, with the head and pronotum light reddish brown and the antennae yellowish. The surface is shiny and nearly glabrous.
