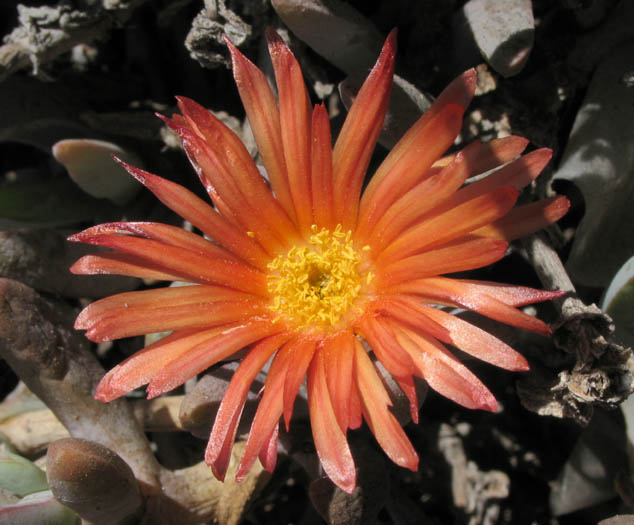

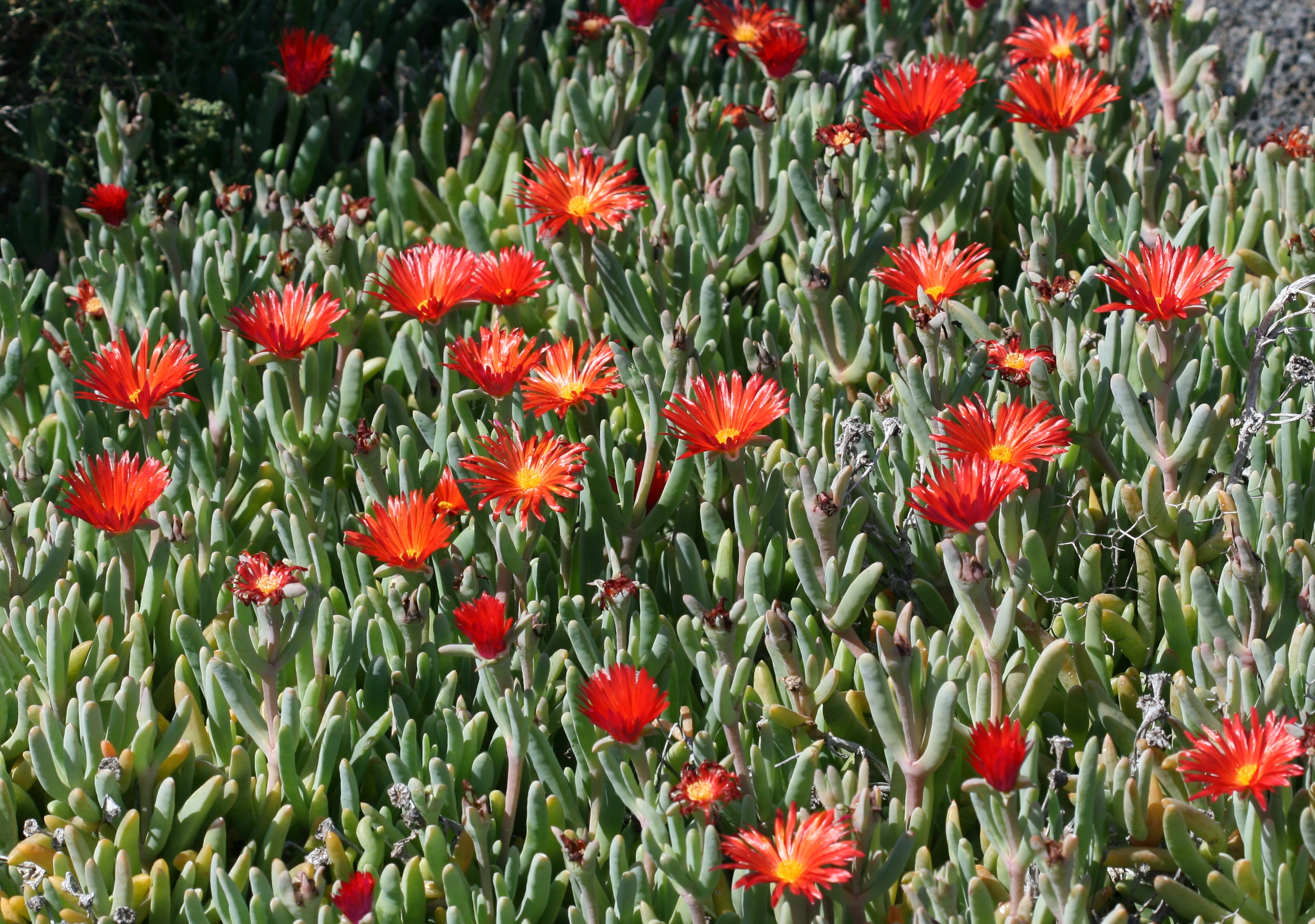

Scientific classification
- Kingdom: Plantae
- Clade: Embryophytes
- Clade: Tracheophytes
- Clade: Angiosperms
- Clade: Eudicots
- Order: Caryophyllales
- Family: Aizoaceae
- Genus: Malephora
- Species: M. crocea

Binomial name
- Malephora crocea (Jacq.) Schwant.

Synonyms
- Mesembryanthemum croceum

= Malephora crocea =

Species of succulent

Malephora crocea is a species of succulent perennial flowering plant in the ice plant family known by the common names 'coppery mesemb' and 'red ice plant'.

== Description ==
M. crocea is a succulent, herbaceous, perennial groundcover, growing to only a few inches in height but potentially spreading laterally by many feet, and in all directions; the plant has a cork-like, woody stem which takes root anywhere it is able to come into contact with the terrain, be it dirt, sand, grass, or soil.

The water-filled foliage is triangular in cross-section, a few centimeters long, pale green to reddish in color, and somewhat waxy in texture. The flower is borne on a short stalk. It has many narrow petals in shades of red, orange, and yellow, sometimes with purplish undersides. The fruit is a valved capsule containing many lens-shaped seeds.

== Distribution ==
It is native to Southern Africa but is grown in many other regions of the world, primarily as an ornamental plant, but also as a fireproof groundcover. In parts of Southern California, and further south into Mexico's Baja California and Baja California Sur states, Malephora crocea is a non-native, introduced species, originally planted as highway landscaping in areas of low rainfall, and for early railroad track reinforcement, in the late 1800s. However, due to the many climatic similarities between the Baja California peninsula, Southern California and its native Southern Africa, the species has long been established, and now reseeds prolifically. It will even re-grow from undisturbed rootstock in the springtime.

== Habitat ==
In some areas of introduction, Malephora crocea is somewhat maligned, and even considered to be a noxious weed. The plant's shallow root system may exacerbate soil erosion, as it cannot penetrate the earth deeply enough to stabilize the terrain, like a tree or shrub, if planted on a sloped incline. Over time, a stand or "colony" of the plant grows and becomes heavier due to the water content stored in its leaves, raising the risk of landslides or other such accidents, especially when growing on slopes along roads. This is especially concerning on the Pacific coast of California, where it may self-seed and germinate on the delicate sandstone cliffs, contributing to their erosion, as well.

Indeed, M. crocea has established itself widely along Californian beaches and blisteringly-hot seaside cliffs, even with little to no organic matter in the ground, surviving largely off of marine layer and fog, and any precipitation that may occur. The species' ability to sprout roots in pure, sun-baked sand is a testament to its resilience, growing in locations that would burn the tissues of most other plants, both from the ambient heat and the sea salt exposure. Malephora crocea has also been planted along some highways in Arizona—hundreds of miles away from the ocean, in areas with very little rainfall—and is thus valued in that state for xeriscaping with its low water needs, its need for hot, direct sun, and its reliable blooms for pollinators, such as bees, butterflies, and hummingbirds, among others. The lush, water-filled leaves may also be picked-at by birds (possibly for resembling worms or caterpillars) or other animals in times of drought, resulting in a raggedy, torn-looking plant.

== Cultivation ==
Despite its potential for mismanagement—albeit in the wrong hands—, M. crocea is still quite popular outside of its native range for its visual appeal and floral impact, and general ease of care. It is especially recommended in wildfire-prone regions of California due to its foliar "succulence", hence the plants low rate of flammability. The water-storing foliage may aid as a firebreak plant in the event of burning, wildfire or otherwise, especially when planted densely with other succulent species.
