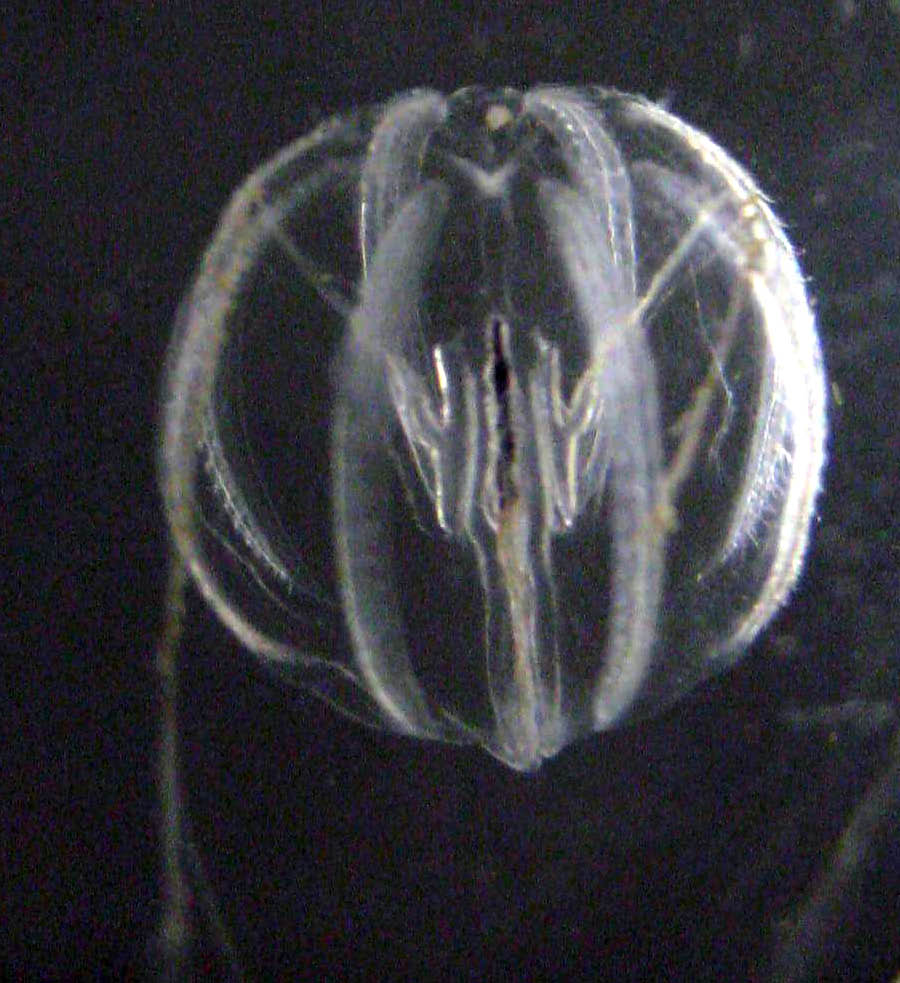

Scientific classification
- Kingdom: Animalia
- Phylum: Ctenophora
- Class: Tentaculata
- Order: Cydippida
- Family: Cydippidae; Gegenbaur, 1856

Synonyms
- Pleurobrachiidae Chun, 1880

= Cydippidae =

Family of ctenophore

Cydippidae is a family of ctenophores, in the Cydippida.

Five genera are recognized:

- Attenboroughctena Ceccolini & Cianferoni, 2020
- Hormiphora L. Agassiz, 1860
- Minictena C. Carré & D. Carré, 1993
- Pleurobrachia Fleming, 1822
- Tinerfe Chun, 1898
