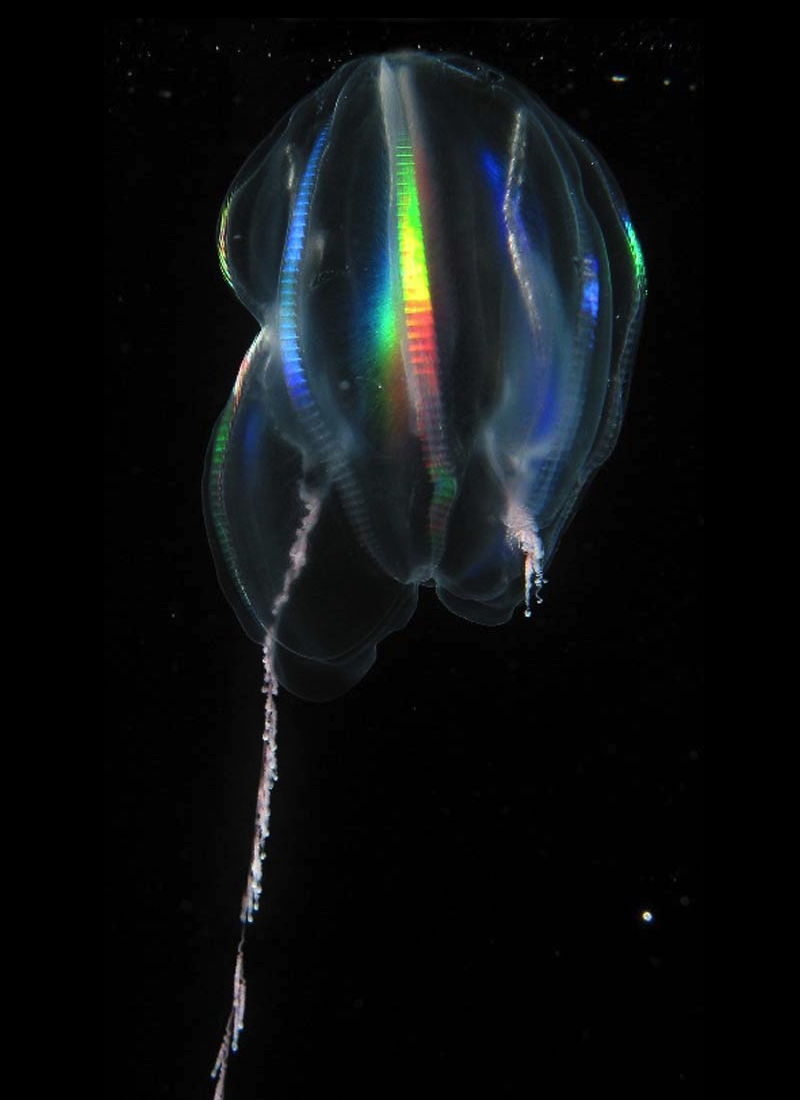
- Mertensia ovum

Scientific classification
- Kingdom: Animalia
- Phylum: Ctenophora
- Class: Tentaculata
- Order: Cydippida

Families
- See text

= Cydippida =

Order of comb jellies with retractable branched tentacles

Cydippida is an order of comb jellies. They are distinguished from other comb jellies by their spherical or oval bodies, and the fact their tentacles are branched, and can be retracted into pouches on either side of the pharynx. The order is not monophyletic, that is, it does not form a single clade.

== Anatomy ==
Cydippids have bodies that are more or less rounded, sometimes nearly spherical and other times more cylindrical or egg-shaped; the common coastal "sea gooseberry," Pleurobrachia, has an egg-shaped body with the mouth at the narrow end. From opposite sides of the body extends a pair of long, slender tentacles, each housed in a sheath into which it can be withdrawn. Some species of cydippids have bodies that are flattened to various extents, so that they are wider in the plane of the tentacles.

The tentacles are typically fringed with tentilla ("little tentacles"), although a few genera have simple tentacles without these side-branches. The tentacles and tentilla are densely covered with microscopic colloblasts that capture prey by sticking to it. These are specialized mushroom-shaped cells in the outer layer of the epidermis, and have three main components: a domed head with vesicles (chambers) that contain adhesive; a stalk that anchors the cell in the lower layer of the epidermis or in the mesoglea; and a spiral thread that coils round the stalk and is attached to the head and to the root of the stalk. The function of the spiral thread is uncertain, but it may absorb stress when prey tries to escape, and thus prevent the colloblast from being torn apart.

In addition to colloblasts, members of the genus Haeckelia, which feed mainly on jellyfish, incorporate their victims' stinging cnidocytes into their own tentacles — some cnidaria-eating nudibranchs similarly incorporate cnidocytes into their bodies for defense. The tentilla of Euplokamis differ significantly from those of other cydippids: they contain striated muscle, a cell type otherwise unknown in the comb jellies; and they are coiled when relaxed, while the tentilla of all other known ctenophores elongate when relaxed.

Euplokamis' tentilla have three types of movement that are used in capturing prey: they may flick out very quickly (in 40 to 60 milliseconds); they can wriggle, which may lure prey by behaving like small planktonic worms; and they coil around prey. The unique flicking is an uncoiling movement powered by contraction of the striated muscle. The wriggling motion is produced by smooth muscles, but of a highly specialized type. Coiling around prey is accomplished largely by the return of the tentilla to their inactive state, but the coils may be tightened by smooth muscle.

There are eight rows of combs that run from near the mouth to the opposite end, and are spaced evenly round the body. The "combs" beat in a metachronal rhythm rather like that of a Mexican wave. From each balancer in the statocyst a ciliary groove runs out under the dome and then splits to connect with two adjacent comb rows, and in some species runs all the way along the comb rows. This forms a mechanical system for transmitting the beat rhythm from the combs to the balancers, via water disturbances created by the cilia.

== Families ==
Cydippida contains 13 families:

- Aulacoctenidae
- Bathyctenidae
- Cryptocodidae
- Ctenellidae
- Cydippidae
- Dryodoridae
- Euplokamididae
- Haeckeliidae
- Lampeidae
- Mertensiidae
- Pleurobrachiidae
- Pukiidae
- Vampyroctenidae

There are additionally incertae sedis genera including Duobrachium.

== See also ==
- Benthic comb jelly – Comb jelly found in the Ryukyu Trench near Japan
