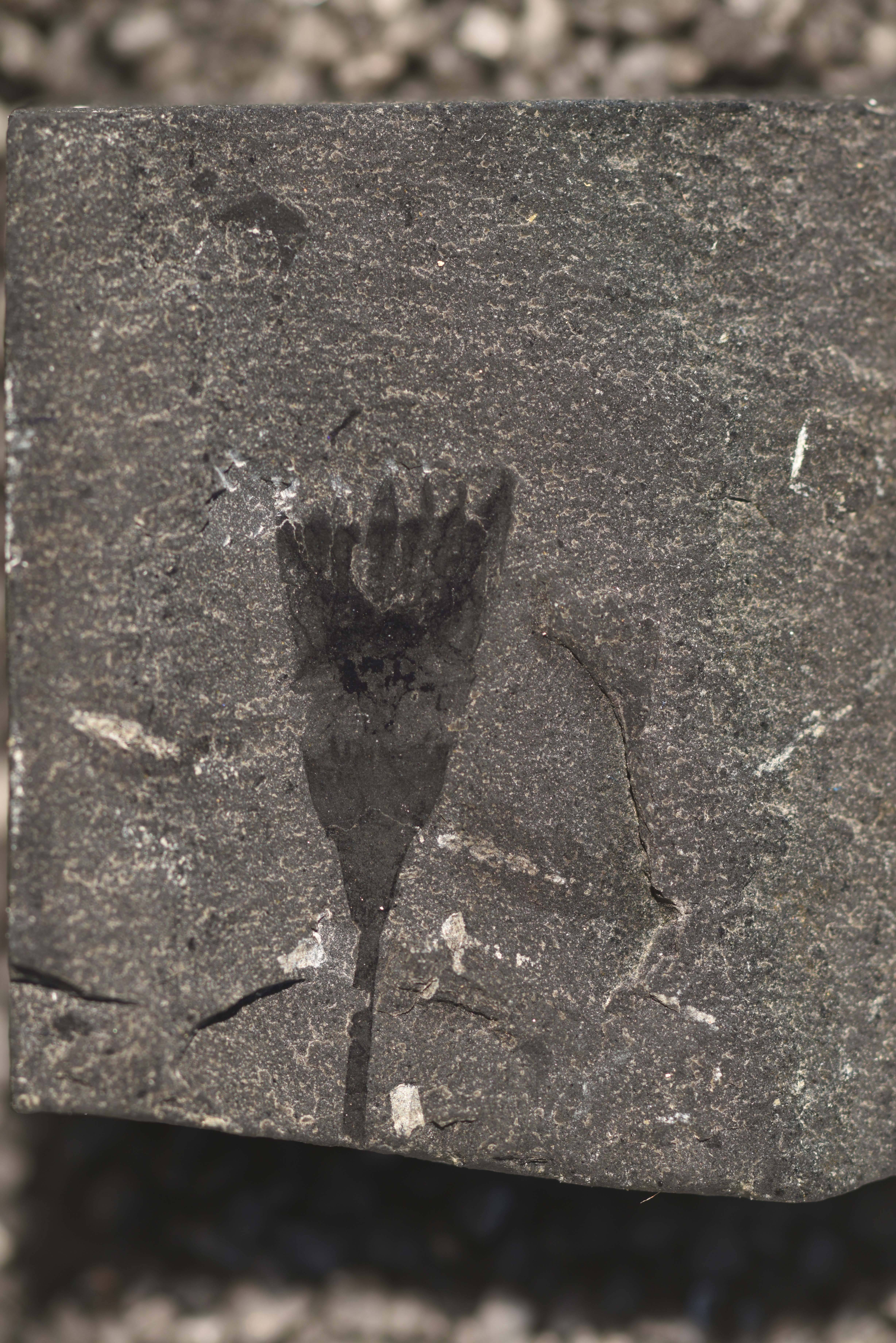
- Dinomischus isolatus, the type genus and namesake of the family

Scientific classification
- Kingdom: Animalia
- Phylum: Ctenophora
- Stem group: Ctenophora
- Family: †Dinomischidae; Conway Morris, 1977

Type genus
- †Dinomischus Conway Morris, 1977

Other genera
- †Xianguangia Chen & Erdtmann, 1991; †Calathites Luo et al., 1999; †Daihua Zhao et al., 2019; †Daihuoides? Klug et al., 2021; †Tentalus? Kimmig et al., 2025; †Theiokylixia Parry et al., 2025

= Dinomischidae =

Dinomischidae Temporal range: Cambrian Stage 3–Miaolingian Possible middle Frasnian record if Daihuoides is a member of this family

Extinct family of stem-group ctenophores

Dinomischidae is an extinct family, which is commonly recovered as a stem-group to the wider phylum Ctenophora, and were around during the Cambrian period from the unnamed Stage 3 to the Miaolingian, with probable records from the middle Frasnian of the Late Devonian. There has also been a report of a sister taxon to the family in the late Ediacaran of Newfoundland and Labrador. They are commonly composed of a central stalk, with a holdfast structure at the base, and a large cup-like body, with a crown of tentacles set on top.

== Description ==
Morphological reconstructions of all definitive dinomischid taxa. Not to scale

In the original description by Conway Morris when the family was erected in 1977, dinomischids bear long, slender stems rising from a bulbous holdfast with a large calyx on top, which itself bears a crown of tentacles encircling both openings of the gut. The tentacles in dinomischids always number 18 in total, all with sclerotised rods set within them, whilst sets of paired pinnules emerge from the tentacles. These pinnules bear distal facing rows of compound cilia.

Some dinomischids, such as Xianguangia, have been noted to not bear any stalk-like structures, although later studies showed that this is likely due to specimens of stalkless taxa not being preserved in-situ, where the stalk was detached during a high-energy event, with the calyx being transported and deposited without the stalk. This is further backed up by dinomischids found in formations from Utah rarely preserving with stalks, and the large central pore on the underside of Xianguangia.

== Distribution ==
Dinomischids have a wide geographical range across Cambrian strata, being found in formations such as the Stephen Formation in Canada, the Maotianshan Shales in South China, the Kaili Formation in Southwest China, and the Langston and Marjum Formations in Utah. There are also tentative dinomischids from the Devonian aged Escuminac Formation in Canada.

== Palaeoecology ==
Due to the notable presence of a holdfast structure, and a stem, it has been agreed that the dinomischids were sessile benthic in nature, with the holdfast sitting within soft but tough substrates such as mud in shallow-marine environments, and most members of the family are also found as lone individuals and are relatively uncommon, suggesting that they were not gregarious and were sparsely spread over the sea-floor.

== Taxonomy ==
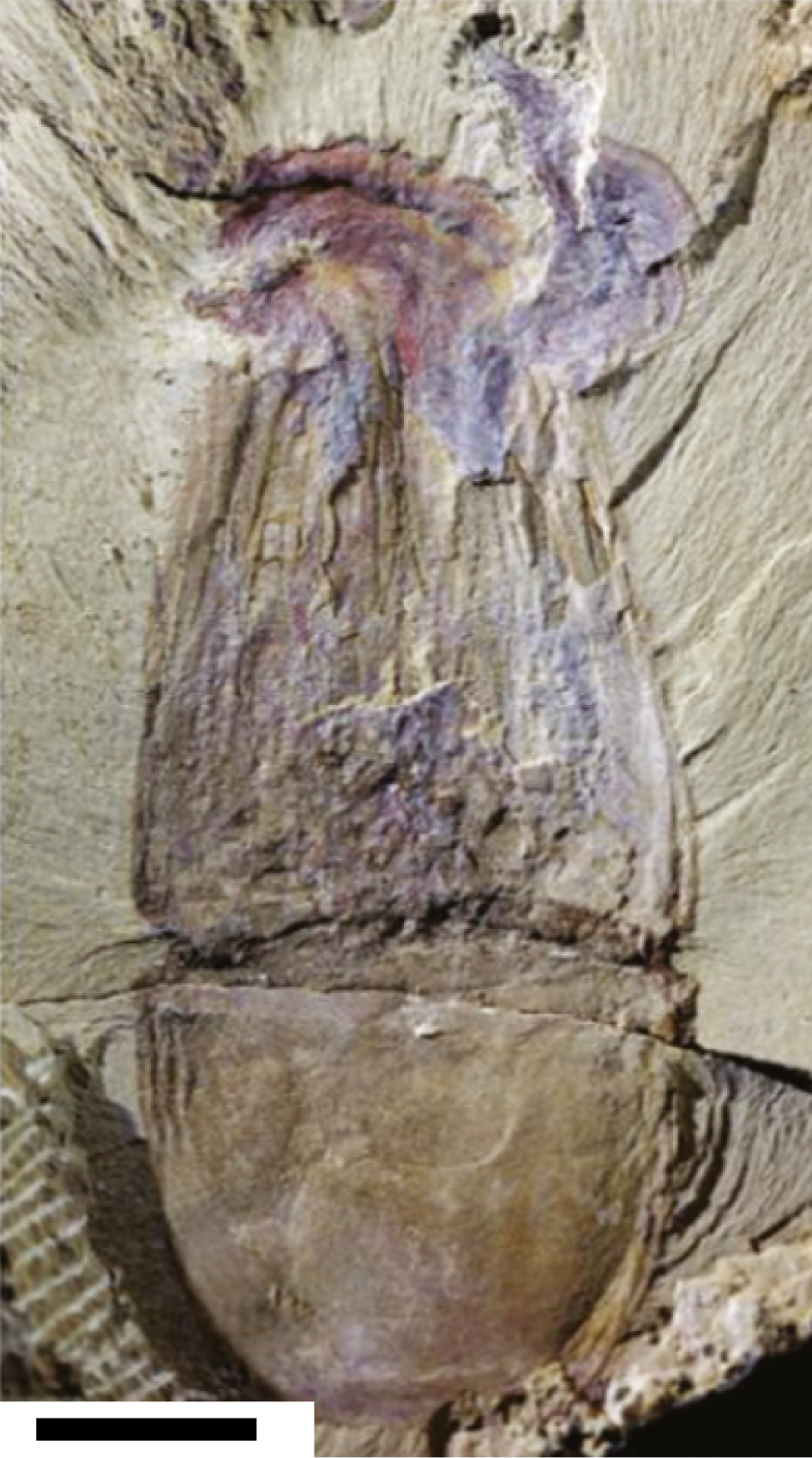
Fossil of Xianguangia sinica

Dinomischidae currently contains seven valid genera, two of which are tentatively placed within the family, which are as follows :

- †Dinomischus Conway Morris, 1977
  - †Dinomischus isolatus Conway Morris, 1977
  - †Dinomischus venustus Peng et al., 2006
  - †Dinomischus nudus Parry et al., 2025
- †Xianguangia Chen & Erdtmann, 1991
  - †Xianguangia sinica Chen & Erdtmann, 1991
- †Calathites Luo et al., 1999
  - †Calathites spinalis Luo et al., 1999
  - †Calathites macrocalyx Parry et al., 2025
- †Daihua Zhao et al., 2019
  - †Daihua sanqiong Zhao et al., 2019
- †Daihuoides (?) Klug et al., 2021
  - †Daihuoides jakobvintheri (?) Klug et al., 2021
- †Tentalus (?) Kimmig et al., 2025
  - †Tentalus jakobvintheri (?) Kimmig et al., 2025
- †Theiokylixia Parry et al., 2025
  - †Theiokylixia cartwrightae Parry et al., 2025

== Affinities ==
When erected in 1977 by Conway to contain Dinomishcus, it was originally unknown what phylum Dinomishidae belonged to, although it was noted that it did bear some similarities to the extant, deep-sea sea pen genus Umbellula, which also has a bulbous holdfast, long slender stem, and a rosette of feeding polyps at the top, although it was noted that this was likely entirely superficial, specially with a far more advanced gut than cnidarians have. Other comparisons where also made to more extant genera, such as to stalked sponge Hyalonema, which was noted that though they share a basic body plan, Hyalonema was far to simple in this regard, with a similar note given for a comparison to the stalked tunicate genera Boltenia and Culeolus.

Conway then noted that Dinomishcus bore similarities to some eocrinoids, an extinct class of echinoderms, such as Akadocrinus and Gogia, as well as Echmatocrinus. Although, due to the absence of calcareous plates and ossicles in Dinomishcus precluded any true comparison, and this potentially affinity was similarly discounted. With this, one last comparison was made to the Entoprocta and Ectoprocta, with it being noted that Dinomischus bears superficial resemblance to an individual entoproct, with both having a recurved gut instead a calyx, set on top of a tall stem, although there were some differences, namely that Dinomishcus is several magnitudes larger than the largest known entoproct, and that its bracts where considered to not be true tentacles, although they do circle the openings to the gut. Thus, Conway concluded that Dinomischus, and by extension the Dinomishidae, were potentially distantly related to the entoprocts.

Come 2019, Zhao et al. would describe a new fossil from the Chengjiang area of the Maotianshan Shales in China, in the form of Daihua. With this, the researchers would see Xianguangia assigned to the Dinomischidae alongside Daihua, noting that Daihua bore similarities to both Xianguangia and Dinomischus. This would also see the dinomischids recovered as lower stem-group ctenophores. It has also been noted that Siphusauctum shares some similarities to the dinomischids, itself being recovered placed after them phylogenetically, and eventually giving rise to the Scleroctenophora and crown ctenophores.

In 2021, a new genus described and named as Daihuoides, would be placed between the dinomischids and the scleroctenophores similar to Siphusauctum, although in 2025, Parry et al. would see it tentatively regarded as being a dinomischid itself. In 2017 and 2022, the dinomischids would be suggested to be stem-group cnidarians, although again in 2025, Parry et al. would discount this and support the ctenophore affinity. In 2026, a new Ediacaran genus from the Inner Meadow locality in Newfoundland was named, Edrathina, which was recovered several times through phylogenetic analysis to be a sister taxon to the Dinomischidae. Although, it has been noted that it is considerably simpler, only bearing six tentacles instead of the 18 known in dinomischids, as well as the lack of tentacles sheaths.

=== Phylogeny ===
In 2019, when describing Daihua, Zhao et al. would also undertake a phylogenetic study, resulting in a Bayesian tree, which is as follows :

Bayesian Tree

- - Choanoflagellatea
  - Porifera
  - - Placozoa
    - - - Xenacoelomorpha
        - Nephrozoa
      - - Ctenophora total group
          - †Xianguangia
          - - †Daihua
            - - †Dinomischus
              - - †Siphusauctum
                - †Scleroctenophora
                  - †Thaumactena
                  - †Galeactena
                  - †Batofasciculus
                  - †Maotianoascus
                  - - - †Gemmactena
                      - †Trigoides
                  - Ctenophora total group
                    - †Fasciculus
                    - †Xanioascus
                    - †Ctenorhabdotus
                    - Beroida
                    - - - Cydippida
                        - Platyctendia
                      - - Cestida
                        - - Thalassocalycida
                          - - Lobata
                            - Ganeshida
        - - Anthozoa
          - Medusozoa

In 2025, whilst describing Theiokylixia and Calathites macrocalyx, Parry et al. would undertake a phylogenetic study to resolve the placement of the dinomischids due to recent studies suggesting a cnidarian placement, resulting in two Bayesian tress, which are as follows :

Majority rule consensus Bayesian Tree

- - Choanoflagellatea
  - Porifera
  - - Placozoa
    - - Bilateria
      - - - - - - - †Dinomuschus nudus
                  - †Dinomuschus isolatus
                  - †Dinomuschus venustus
                - - †Xianguangia
                  - †Daihua
                  - †Theiokylixia
                  - - †Calathites spinalis
                    - †Calathites macrocalyx
              - - †Siphusauctum
                - - †Thaumactena
                  - †Galeactena
                  - †Maotianoascus
                  - †Batofasciculus
                  - - - †Trigoides
                      - †Gemmactena
                  - - †Ctenorhabdotus capulus
                    - †Ctenorhabdotus campanelliformis
                    - - †Thalassostapholus
                      - - †Daihuoides
                        - †Fasciculus
                        - †Xanioascus
                        - Ctenophora
        - - Cnidaria

Majority rule consensus Bayesian Tree, with constrained position of ctenophores as sister-group of all animals

- - Choanoflagellatea
  - - - †Thaumactena
      - †Galeactena
      - †Maotianoascus
      - †Batofasciculus
      - - - †Trigoides
          - †Gemmactena
      - - †Ctenorhabdotus capulus
        - †Ctenorhabdotus campanelliformis
        - - †Thalassostapholus
          - - †Daihuoides
            - †Fasciculus
            - †Xanioascus
            - Ctenophora
    - - Porifera
      - - Placozoa
        - - Bilateria
          - - - - - †Siphusauctum
                  - - - †Dinomuschus nudus
                      - †Dinomuschus isolatus
                      - †Dinomuschus venustus
                    - - †Xianguangia
                      - †Daihua
                      - †Theiokylixia
                      - - †Calathites spinalis
                        - †Calathites macrocalyx
            - - Cnidaria

In 2026, when Edrathina was described, Muirhead-Hunt, Rosse-Guillevic, and McIlroy also undertook a phylogenetic study, creating three Bayesian trees as a result, which are as follows. Several informative characters (like the presence of cilia and internal structures of the calyx) were not preserved in Edrathina, and could not be scored :

Optimal unconstrained Bayesian tree

- - Choanoflagellatea
  - Porifera
  - - Placozoa
    - - Bilateria
      - - Cnidaria
          - Anthozoa
          - - Hydrozoa
            - - - Atorella
                - Nausithoe
              - - Aurelia
                - Rhizostoma
              - - - Craterolophus
                  - Haliclystus
                  - †Haootia
                  - †Mamsetia
                - - Chiropsalmus
                  - - Carukia
                    - Carybdea
        - Ctenophora total group
          - - †Edrathina
            - - †Dinomischus isolatus
              - †Dinomischus venustus
              - - †Calathites
                - - †Daihua
                  - †Xianguangia
          - - †Siphusauctum
            - Ctenophora

Optimal Bayesian tree with ParaHoxozoa constrained as monophyletic

- - Choanoflagellatea
  - Porifera
  - - - Placozoa
      - - Bilateria
        - Cnidaria
          - Anthozoa
          - - Hydrozoa
            - - - Atorella
                - Nausithoe
              - - Aurelia
                - Rhizostoma
              - - - Craterolophus
                  - Haliclystus
                  - †Haootia
                  - †Mamsetia
                - - Chiropsalmus
                  - - Carukia
                    - Carybdea
    - Ctenophora total group
      - - †Edrathina
        - - †Dinomischus isolatus
          - †Dinomischus venustus
          - - †Calathites
            - - †Daihua
              - †Xianguangia
      - - †Siphusauctum
        - Ctenophora

Optimal Bayesian tree with Ctenophora constrained as diverging first

- - Choanoflagellatea
  - - Porifera
    - - Bilateria
      - - Placozoa
        - Cnidaria
          - Anthozoa
          - - Hydrozoa
            - - - Atorella
                - Nausithoe
              - - Aurelia
                - Rhizostoma
              - - - Craterolophus
                  - Haliclystus
                  - †Haootia
                  - †Mamsetia
                - - Chiropsalmus
                  - - Carukia
                    - Carybdea
  - Ctenophora total group
    - - †Edrathina
      - - †Dinomischus isolatus
        - †Dinomischus venustus
        - - †Calathites
          - - †Daihua
            - †Xianguangia
    - - †Siphusauctum
      - Ctenophora
