= Ctenorhabdotus =

Ctenorhabdotus Temporal range: Wuliuan-Drumian
- Paratype of Ctenorhabdotus capulus preserving oral skirt (top) and comb rows (boxed)

Scientific classification
- Kingdom: Animalia
- Phylum: Ctenophora
- Genus: †Ctenorhabdotus; Conway Morris and Collins, 1996

Type species
- †Ctenorhabdotus capulus Conway Morris and Collins, 1996

Species
- †Ctenorhabdotus capulus Conway Morris and Collins, 1996; †Ctenorhabdotus campanelliformis Parry et al. 2021

Extinct genus of comb jellies

Ctenorhabdotus is a genus of early ctenophore (or comb jelly) known from two species: the type species Ctenorhabdotus capulus, known from several specimens recovered from the Burgess Shale of British Columbia, and Ctenorhabdotus campanelliformis, known only from the holotype UMNH.IP.6125 from the Marjum Formation of Utah. It represents an intermediate between the scleroctenophores and crown-group ctenophores, having primitive traits, like an oral skirt and remnants of the scleroctenophore skeleton, that are absent in modern ctenophores, but also being largely soft-bodied like crown-group ctenophores.

== Etymology ==
The genus name Ctenorhabdotus originates from the Greek words ktenos "comb" and rhabdotos "striped", and refers to the pronounced stripe-like preservation of the comb rows in C. capulus.

The specific name of C. capulus comes from the Latin word capulus "handle" and refers to the diagnostic apical capsule of the genus. The specific name of C. campanelliformis comes from the Latin words campanella "small bell" and formis "shape", referring to the bell-shaped body of the species.

== Description ==
Ctenorhabdotus is a pelagic ctenophore with a body length of 14.5 mm (for C. campanelliformis) or between 16-70 mm (for C. capulus). Like all ctenophores, Ctenorhabdotus has radial symmetry around an oral-aboral axis (from the mouth to the opposite end). The body of C. capulus is typically box-like, with flat oral and aboral ends and roughly parallel sides, but can also be spherical in more contracted specimens. However, C. campanelliformis has a roughly trapezoidal body with a wide oral end and a narrower aboral end.

Unlike modern ctenophores but like its fellow Burgess Shale ctenophore Xanioascus, Ctenorhabdotus had 24 comb rows grouped into eight sets of three comb rows each. Each set of three comb rows originates from a trifurcating ciliary groove that extends from the apical organ on the aboral pole of the organism. The apical organ contains a statocyst but, unlike crown-group ctenophores and Xanioascus, lacks polar fields, and is encased in a distinctive, lightly sclerotized apical capsule that is a remnant of the skeleton of the scleroctenophores.

Ctenorhabdotus lacked the paired tentacles seen in most modern ctenophores, instead having a large mouth like other Cambrian ctenophores and the modern beroids. The mouth was surrounded by an oral skirt, a trait shared by the scleroctenophores and Thalassostaphylos but absent in modern taxa.

C. campanelliformis preserves traces of the nervous system. In particular, it preserved longitudinal nerves running below the comb rows, similar to the 'giant axons' of the Burgess Shale ctenophore Fasciculus and the extant cydippid Euplokamis, as well as the nerves below the paired comb rows in dinomischids, Siphusauctum, and the scleroctenophores. In C. campanelliformis, the longitudinal nerves merged with a circumoral nerve ring, which may have controlled the oral skirt during feeding. The circumoral nerve ring has not been reported in any other ctenophores, but may be a common feature for Cambrian forms that is only rarely preserved.

== Phylogeny ==
Parry et al., 2021 ran a phylogenetic analysis on Cambrian ctenophores and found Ctenorhabdotus to be a stem-ctenophore more derived than the scleroctenophores but less derived than Thalassostaphylos, Fasciculus, and Xanioascus. They also created an ancestral state reconstruction and found that the presence of longitudinal comb row nerves, an oral skirt, and a sclerotized skeleton, as well as the absence of tentacles and polar fields, was the plesiomorphic condition for pelagic ctenophores.

- - Siphusauctum
  - Pelagic ctenophores
    - Galeactena
    - - Gemmactena
      - Batofasciculus
    - - Maotianoascus
      - - - Ctenorhabdotus capulus
          - Ctenorhabdotus campanelliformis
        - - Thalassostaphylos
          - - Fasciculus
            - Xanioascus
            - Crown-group Ctenophora

Trait evolution in ctenophores after Parry et al., 2021:

- ■ Skeleton ■ Oral skirt ■ Comb row nerve tract
  - Scleroctenophores
  - ■ Skeleton reduced to apical capsule
    - Ctenorhabdotus campanelliformis
    - ■ Apical capsule lost ■ Polar fields
      - Thalassostaphylos elegans
      - Crown-group Ctenophora ■ Oral skirt lost ■ Eight comb rows
        - Euplokamis
        - ■ Nerve tract lost
          Beroe

== Paleobiology ==
Like crown-group ctenophores, Ctenorhabdotus was likely an active pelagic hunter, as it had well-developed comb rows. It and other Cambrian ctenophores had large mouths and likely fed by engulfing large prey items, unlike modern ctenophores which primarily feed using paired tentacles. The mouth in Ctenorhabdotus was surrounded by a large oral skirt, which likely aided in swallowing their prey. Extant beroid ctenophores feed in a similar manner, and the circumoral nerve net found in beroids may be functionally analogous to the circumoral nerve ring in Ctenorhabdotus campanelliformis.

== Paleoecology and preservation ==
Ctenorhabdotus capulus has only been found in the Burgess Shale (Wuliuan, Bathyuriscus-Elrathina zone) of British Columbia. Five specimens have been found within the Greater Phyllopod bed (Walcott Quarry), where Ctenorhabdotus makes up less than 0.1% of the population. In addition, C. capulus has also been found in the Raymond Quarry, stratigraphically above the Phyllopod bed. C. capulus is found on greenish (when weathered) or dark gray (when exposed) shale surfaces, where it is associated with the agnostid trilobite Peronopsis montis, the non-trilobite arthropods Leanchoilia superlata and Canadaspis perfecta, the priapulids Ottoia prolifica and Selkirkia columbia, and the sponge Hazelia delicatula. Specimens usually show only little evidence of decay.

The holotype and only known specimen of Ctenorhabdotus campanelliformis, UMNH.IP.6125, is most likely from the Marjum Formation (Drumian, lower Ptychagnostus punctuosus zone) of Utah. The internal organs of the specimen, including the comb row nerves, are preserved as a carbonaceous film, while the margins of the fossil and oral skirt lack carbon enrichment. Unlike in C. capulus, where the comb rows are preserved as prominent dark stripes, the comb rows of C. campanelliformis are inconspicuous and preserved as faint transverse features, while the ciliary grooves are more conspicuously preserved.
