= Fasciculus =

Fasciculus Temporal range: Wuliuan
- Reconstruction of Fasciculus vesanus

Scientific classification
- Kingdom: Animalia
- Phylum: Ctenophora
- Genus: †Fasciculus; Simonetta & Delle Cave, 1978
- Species: †F. vesanus

Binomial name
- †Fasciculus vesanus Simonetta & Delle Cave, 1978

Extinct genus of comb jellies

Fasciculus is an extinct genus of stem-group ctenophores. It contains one species: the type species Fasciculus vesanus, known only from the holotype USNM 139215, found in the Phyllopod bed of the Burgess Shale. F. vesanus is unique among both crown-group and stem-group ctenophores for its large number of comb rows (80 comb rows in total) that were arranged in central and marginal zones rather than radially as in other ctenophores.

== Etymology ==
The genus name Fasciculus originates from the Latin word fasciculus "bundle," referring to the large number of comb rows in F. vesanus. The specific name of F. vesanus comes from the Latin word vesanus "wild" and refers to the animal's unusual appearance.

== Description ==
Fasciculus is a pelagic ctenophore known only from the holotype of F. vesanus, USNM 139215. The specimen is incomplete and lacks an oral region, but the preserved portion is semicircular, with a maximum body width of 103 mm and a body length of 58 mm.

Size of Fasciculus vesanus compared to a human hand.

The most distinctive feature of Fasciculus was its comb rows, which were not radially arranged like in other ctenophores but were arranged in paired central and marginal zones. Each central zone was composed of eight comb rows, with four rows on each side of the midline. The central comb rows were elongate and approximately the same length, but were offset orally away from the midline. In contrast, each marginal zone was composed of 16 pairs of serially arranged comb rows. The marginal comb rows were much shorter than the central comb rows, but gradually lengthened away from the midline. In total, Fasciculus had 80 comb rows, comprising 16 central comb rows and 64 marginal comb rows. The comb rows in both the central and marginal zones were subparallel through most of their length, but tapered to a point at both ends.

The only known specimen of Fasciculus also preserved four tetraradially arranged 'lobate organs' that expanded in width orally. The 'lobate organs' appear to be segmented and composed of imbricating units with a 'feathery' appearance.

Some of the comb rows of Fasciculus preserve a thin strand running along the midline. This strand likely represents remains of longitudinal nerves running down the comb row tract, similar to the extant ctenophore Euplokamis but unlike other ctenophores. Comb row nerves are also present in the dinomischids, Siphusauctum, the scleroctenophores, and Ctenorhabdotus, suggesting that they were plesiomorphic for Ctenophora as a whole.

== Phylogeny ==
Parry et al., 2021 ran a phylogenetic analysis on Cambrian ctenophores and found Fasciculus to be in a polytomy with Xanioascus and crown-group ctenophores.

- - Siphusauctum
  - Pelagic ctenophores
    - Galeactena
    - - Gemmactena
      - Batofasciculus
    - - Maotianoascus
      - - - Ctenorhabdotus capulus
          - Ctenorhabdotus campanellknown spiformis
        - - Thalassostaphylos
          - - Fasciculus
            - Xanioascus
            - Crown-group Ctenophora

== Paleobiology, paleoenvironment, and preservation ==
The presence of well-developed comb rows in Fasciculus suggests that it was an active, pelagic predator. However, its mode of feeding cannot be determined, as the oral region is unknown.

Fasciculus vesanus has only been found in the Burgess Shale (Wuliuan, Bathyuriscus-Elrathina zone) of British Columbia. The holotype and only known specimen, USNM 139215, was found within the Greater Phyllopod bed (Walcott Quarry). It is preserved mostly as a single carbonaceous film, but a "separate level of splitting" in the part and "corresponding outliers" on the counterpart suggests that it was originally quite thick.
