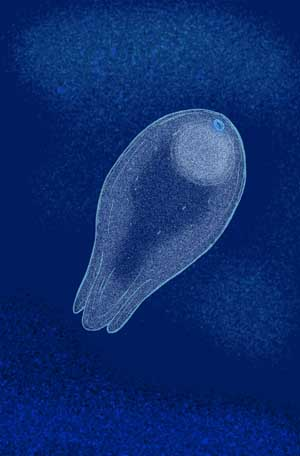
- Artist's reconstruction

Scientific classification
- Domain: Eukaryota
- Kingdom: Animalia
- Phylum: Ctenophora
- Genus: †Sinoascus; Chen & Zhou, 1997
- Species: †S. paillatus

Binomial name
- †Sinoascus paillatus Chen & Zhou, 1997

= Sinoascus =

Sinoascus Temporal range: Cambrian Stage 3

Extinct genus of comb jellies

Sinoascus paillatus is an extinct species of stem-group ctenophore, known from the Maotianshan shales of Yunnan, China. It is dated to Cambrian Stage 3 and belongs to late Early Cambrian strata.

Fossil specimens are poorly preserved, providing little details, if any at all, about the anatomy of the comb rows.

== See also ==
=== Burgess shale ctenophores ===
- Fasciculus vesanus
- Ctenorhabdotus capulus
- Xanioascus canadensis

=== Maotianshan shales ctenophores ===
- Maotianoascus octonarius
- Daihua sanqiong
