= Trigoides =

Trigoides aclis Temporal range: Cambrian Stage 3

Scientific classification
- Kingdom: Animalia
- Phylum: Ctenophora
- Class: †Scleroctenophora
- Genus: †Trigoides; Luo & Hu, 1999
- Species: †T. aclis

Binomial name
- †Trigoides aclis Luo & Hu, 1999

Extinct genus of comb jellies

Trigoides aclis is an extinct species of comb jelly. The genus Trigoides is known from fossils from the Chengjiang Lagerstätte. It is proposed to be a type of ctenophore. A phylogenetic study of Cambrian stem-group ctenophores recovered Trigoides in Scleroctenophora, along with Galeactena, Maotianoascus, Thaumactena, Batofasciculus and Gemmactena.
