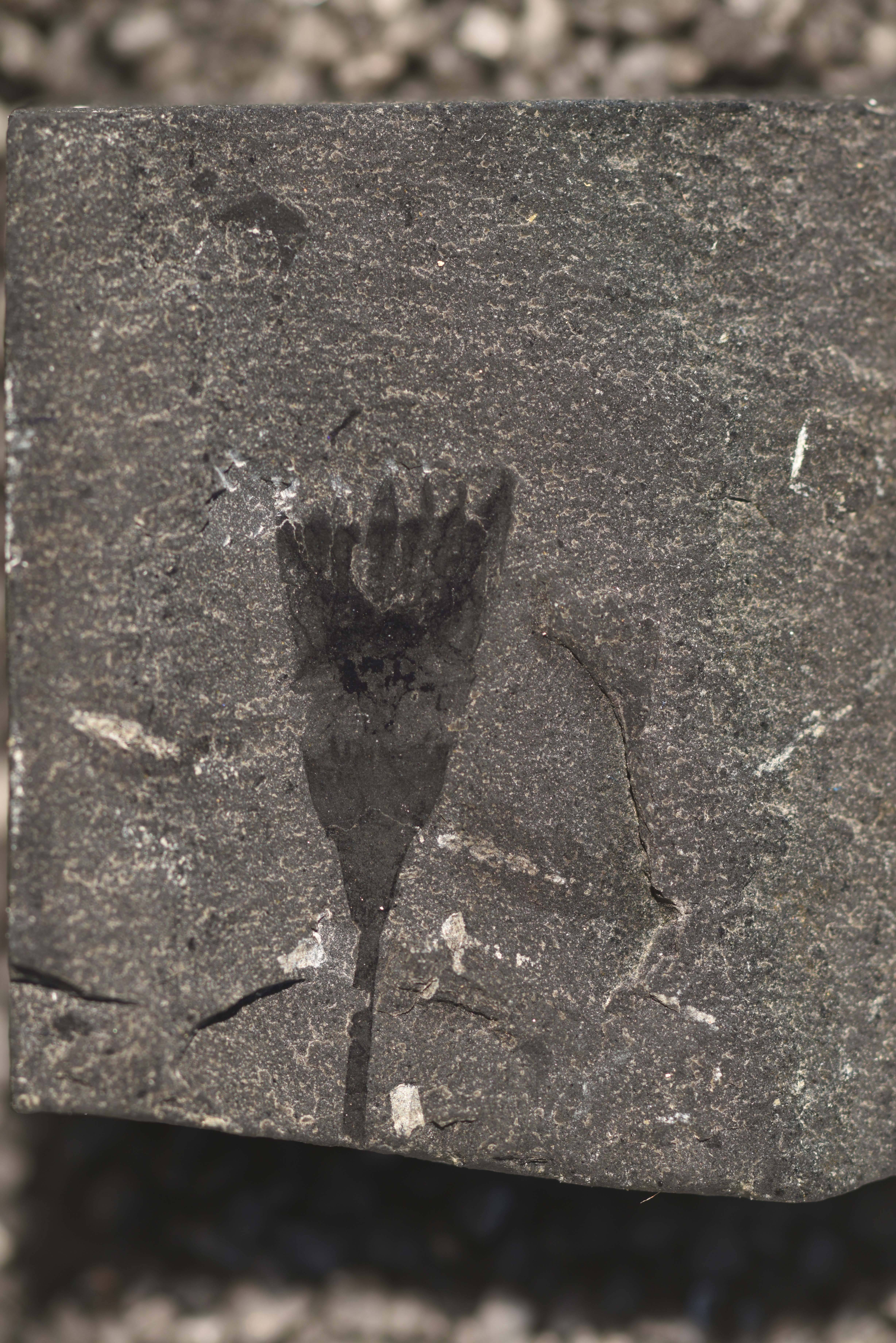
- The holotype of Dinomischus isolatus collected by Walcott

Scientific classification
- Kingdom: Animalia
- Phylum: Ctenophora
- Stem group: Ctenophora
- Family: †Dinomischidae
- Genus: †Dinomischus; Conway Morris, 1977

Type species
- †Dinomischus isolatus Conway Morris, 1977

Species
- †D. isolatus Conway Morris, 1977; †D. nudus Parry et al., 2025; †D. venustus Peng et al., 2006

= Dinomischus =

Dinomischus Temporal range: Chengjiang–Burgess Shale

Genus of stalked filter-feeding animals

Dinomischus is an extinct genus of stalked filter-feeding animals within the Cambrian period, with specimens known from the Burgess Shale, the Maotianshan Shales, the Kaili Formation and the Marjum Formation. While long of uncertain affinities, recent studies have suggested it to be a stem-group ctenophore.

== History of study ==
In his pioneering excavations of the Burgess Shale, Charles Doolittle Walcott excavated the first, and at the time only, specimen. It had evidently caught his eye, for he had taken the trouble to carefully photograph it—but he never found the time to describe the organism, and it was not until 1977 that Simon Conway Morris described the animal. He tracked down two further specimens, collected by further expeditions by teams from Harvard and the Royal Ontario Museum, allowing him to produce a reconstruction.

== Description ==
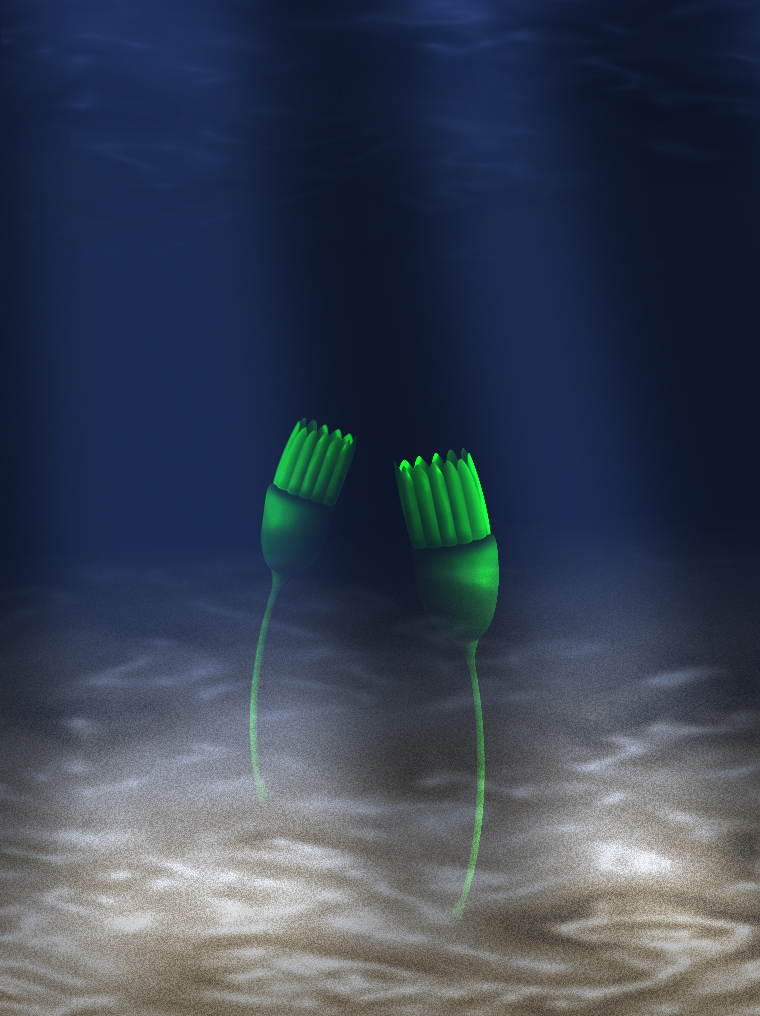
Reconstruction of two D. isolatus in their environment

Dinomischus isolatus reached 20 mm in height, was attached to the sea floor by a stalk, and looked loosely like a flower. The cup-shaped body at the top of the stalk probably fed by filtering the surrounding seawater, and may have created a current to facilitate this. Its mouth and anus sat next to one another. Conway Morris was not able to say much about the organism. It consisted of a calyx (or body) on a long, thin stalk, surrounded by a whorl of 18 short "petals", which enclosed both openings of its U-shaped gut. The presence of this gut identified it as a metazoan, and the stem implied that it lived permanently attached to the sea floor by a small holdfast. The twenty or so "petals" borne by each organism were solid, plate-like structures, about two thirds the length of the calyx. It is speculated that they may have been covered with cilia—fine hairs—which would have wafted food down towards the organism's mouth.

== Distribution ==
13 specimens of Dinomischus are known from the Greater Phyllopod bed, where they comprise < 0.1% of the community. Further specimens have since been produced by similarly spectacular fossil sites in China. 13 have been found in the Chengjiang, then in 2006 one specimen was identified within the Kaili Formation. These organisms merited the erection of a new species, D. venustus, as their corrugated "petals" possessed radial rays.

In 2025, a new species, Dinomischus nudus, was described from the Marjum Formation, as well as another possible species referred to as "Dinomischus sp. A".

== Affinity ==
Dinomischus is not the only sessile, stalked organism from the Cambrian, but it has no obvious relatives in other genera. Siphusauctum gregarium (known as the "tulip animal") has been recovered from the Burgess Shale, but has a clearly different basic anatomy, with multiple openings at the base of the calyx, an anus at the top, and a large six-petaled internal organ interpreted as a filter-feeding device. Dinomischus has also been likened to Eldonia and Velumbrella, although unlike Dinomischus these medusoid organisms have tentacles.

A number of affinities were considered, but on the basis of available evidence it didn't quite seem to fit into any extant phylum. The most similar organisms were the much smaller entoprocts, but even these modern organisms are difficult to classify. The new data on D. venustus have added little to the debate; while a suggestion of echinoderm affinity has been floated, no phyla are compellingly similar to the organism. Other modern ideas, even if a little tenuous, include a suggestion that the organism may have been parasitic, dwelling on the carapaces of larger organisms.

In 2019, Dinomischus and other Cambrian forms were hypothesized to be stem-group ctenophores. This leads to the assertion that ctenophores evolved from immotile, suspensivorous forms, a lifestyle similar to that of polyps. Cladogram after Zhao et al., 2019:

- - Xianguangia
  - - Daihua
    - - Dinomischus
      - - Siphusauctum
        - - Galeactena
          - Crown Ctenophora

A later study suggested that Dinomischus, Diahua and Xianguangia formed a clade, Dinomischidae, with Siphusauctum more closely related to modern ctenophores.

A possible relative, Tentalus spencensis, has been reported from the Cambrian (Wuliuan) Spence Shale of Utah.

Calathites spinalis is another Cambrian fossil species related to Dinomischus, interpreted as a sessile filter-feeding member of the family Dinomischidae.

== See also ==
- Paleobiota of the Burgess Shale
- List of Chengjiang Biota species by phylum
