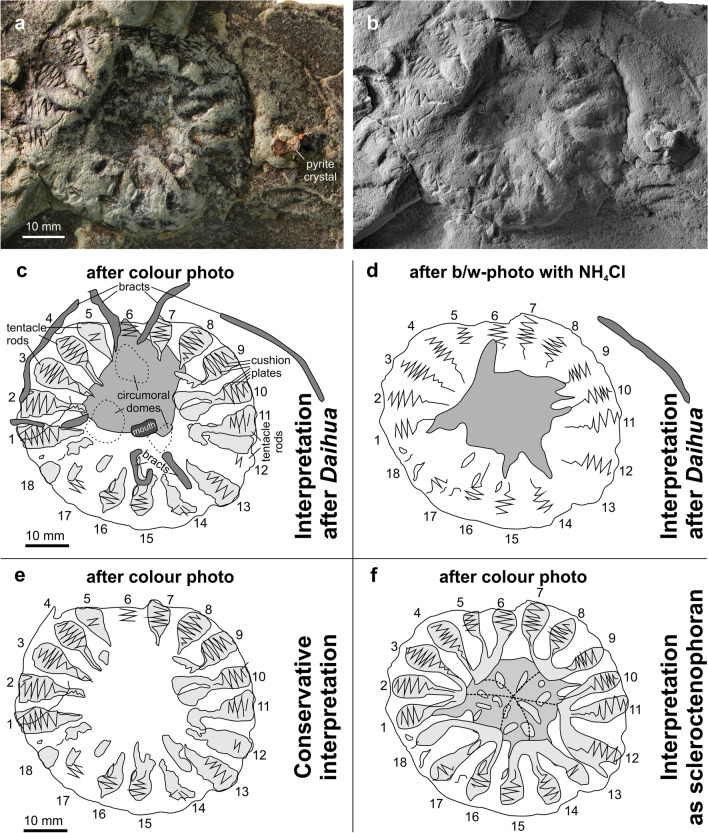
- Photographs and drawings of the holotype, MHNM 24-01

Scientific classification
- Kingdom: Animalia
- Phylum: Ctenophora
- Stem group: Ctenophora
- Family: †Dinomischidae (?)
- Genus: †Daihuoides; Klug et al., 2021
- Species: †D. jakobvintheri

Binomial name
- †Daihuoides jakobvintheri Klug et al., 2021

= Daihuoides =

Daihuoides Temporal range: Late Devonian (middle Frasnian), approx. 375 Ma

Extinct genus of stem-group ctenophores

Daihuoides is an extinct monotypic genus of stem-group ctenophores (possibly a “dinomischid”) that lived in what is now Quebec, Canada during the Late Devonian period, around 375 million years ago. It contains a single species, D. jakobvintheri.

== Etymology ==
The genus name, Daihuoides, is named after Daihua, another stem-group ctenophore, and prefixed with -oides to refer to the morphological similarities between the two.

The type and only species, D. jakobvintheri, is named after Jakob Vinther, honoring him for his contributions to the study of soft-bodied organisms from the Early Palaeozoic.

== Description ==
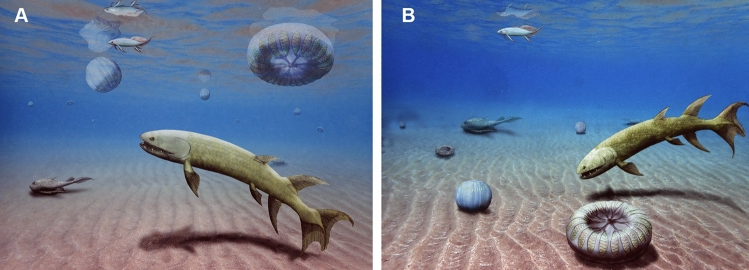
Two reconstructions of Daihuoides jakobvintheri: A: As a planktonic animal B: As a benthic animal

Depending on the morphological and taxonomic interpretation, the holotype MHNM 24-01 is exposed from the oral or the aboral side. It is disc-shaped with a roughly circular outline; the calyx has a diameter of 58.2 millimetres (2.29 in). It carries a circular bulge that is 17.8 millimetres (0.70 in) wide, surrounding a central depression of approximately 20 millimetres (0.79 in) diameter. This depression is largely stained by iron oxides, which cover an irregular surface of about 28 millimetres (1.1 in) in diameter. This surface has some roughly radially arranged projections giving it a star-shaped outline. Micro-CT scan analysis did not reveal any internal anatomical detail.

The bulge surrounding this depression carries 18 club-shaped fields that are arranged radially. Although these fields are quite strongly eroded in some places, all show remains of deeply incised, haematite-stained zigzag-lines. The amplitude of the single bends reaches 7.6 millimetres (0.30 in) in the broadest part of the field and becomes strongly reduced towards the centre of the oral surface. In the broader part of the club-shaped fields, about ten such bends can be seen. The single fields alternate and the zigzags are pointed in both directions. The narrow furrow first reduces the intensity of its curvature and then fades out inward. The club-shaped field is slightly longer than the furrow.

== Phylogeny ==
Daihuoides appears to be an intermediate between more basal stem-group ctenophores ("dinomischids") and the higher Scleroctenophora. It has been placed in between the two, higher than (or possibly a member of) the dinomischids but lower than the Scleroctenophora.

== See also ==
- Escuminac Formation, where the holotype was discovered
