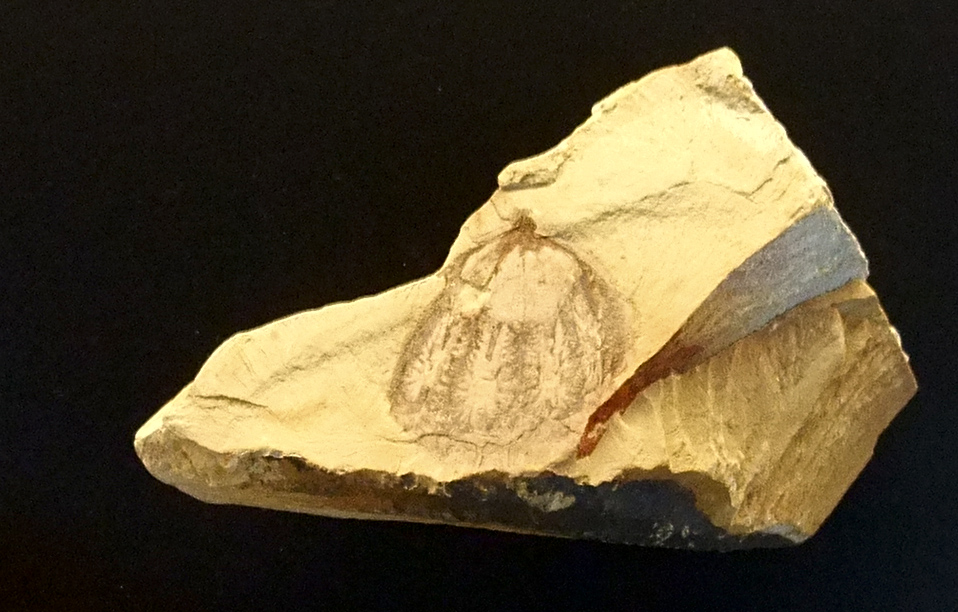
- Fossil
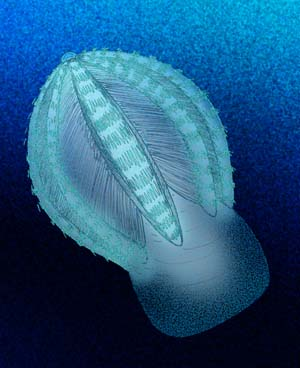
- Artist's reconstruction

Scientific classification
- Kingdom: Animalia
- Phylum: Ctenophora
- Class: †Scleroctenophora
- Genus: †Maotianoascus; Chen & Zhou, 1997
- Species: †M. octonarius

Binomial name
- †Maotianoascus octonarius Chen & Zhou, 1997

= Maotianoascus =

Maotianoascus Temporal range: Cambrian Stage 3

Extinct genus of comb jellies

Maotianoascus octonarius is an extinct species of stem-group ctenophore, known from the Chinese Maotianshan shales of Yunnan. It is dated to Cambrian Stage 3 and belongs to late Early Cambrian strata.

The species is remarkable for its set of eight massive lobes.

A phylogenetic study of Cambrian stem-group ctenophores recovered Maotianoascus in Scleroctenophora, along with Galeactena, Thaumactena, Batofasciculus, Gemmactena and Trigoides.
