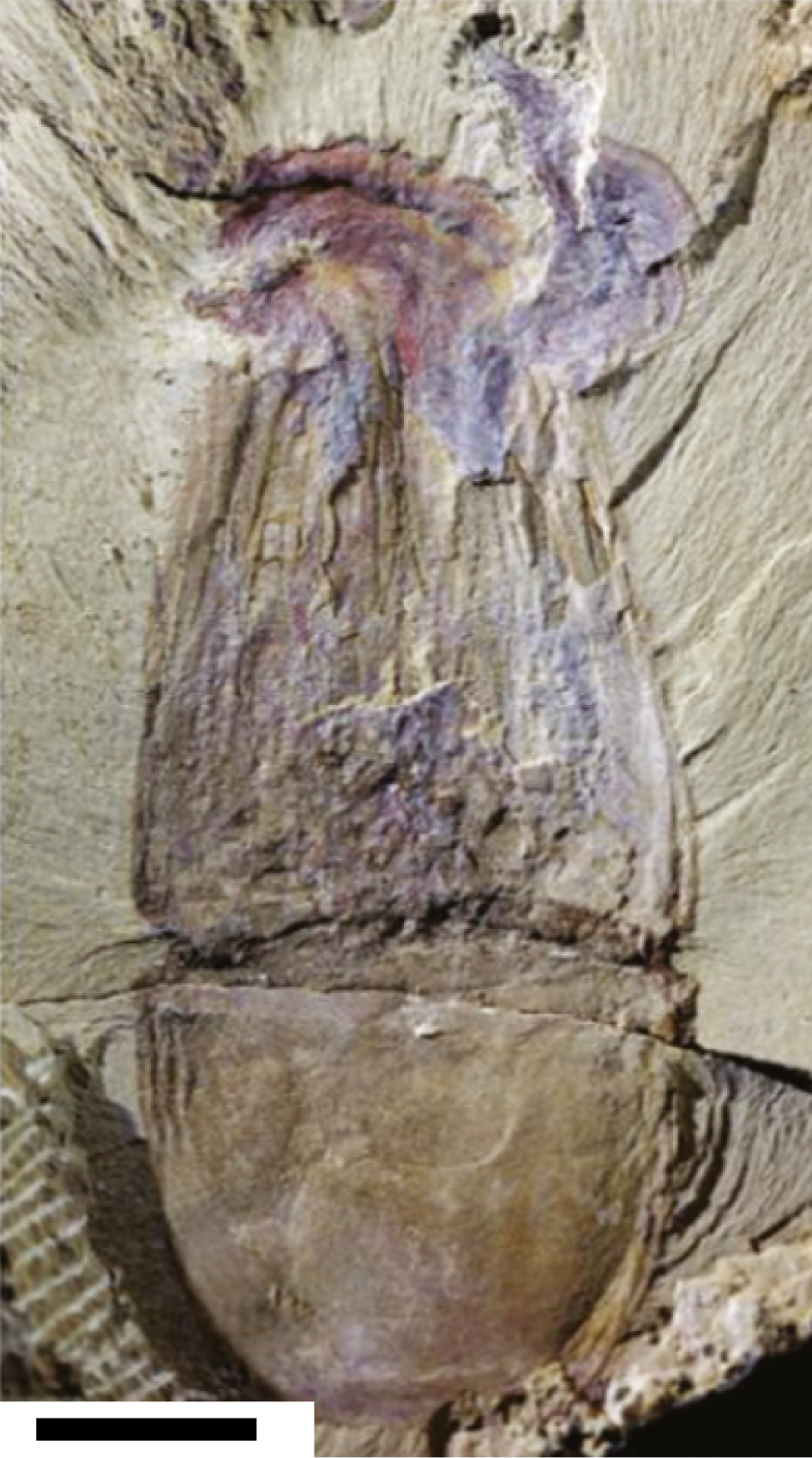
- Fossil of Xianguangia sinica

Scientific classification
- Kingdom: Animalia
- Phylum: Ctenophora
- Stem group: Ctenophora
- Family: †Dinomischidae
- Genus: †Xianguangia
- Species: †X. sinica

Binomial name
- †Xianguangia sinica Chen & Erdtmann, 1991

= Xianguangia =

Xianguangia Temporal range: Cambrian Stage 3, 518 Ma

Extinct genus of soft-bodied animals

Xianguangia is a soft-bodied stem ctenophore assigned to Dinomischiidae from the Chengjiang Biota of China.

== Description ==
Xianguangia sinica has a cylindrical body with a whorl of nearly 16 tentacles around the oral disc, similar to the modern anthozoans. The tentacles are feather-like with dense pinnules on both sides of the axis which would have been well adapted to filter feeding. A bowl-shaped attachment disc at the basal part might commonly have been buried in the sediment to allow its sedentary strategy on the sea floor. The body above the pedal disc is broad and cylindrical and may correspond to the internal gastrovascular cavity. It displays several distinct longitudinal grooves and ridges on the surface, indicating possible mesenteries. However, its phylogenetic affinity has long been questioned; it has even been alleged to be related to members of the Ediacara biota. Studies from the late 2010s onwards argued that it was likely to be member of the stem-group of Ctenophora (comb jellies), related to taxa like Dinomischus and Siphusauctum.

The fossils, found in Yunnan province, China, were initially described as three distinct species, Xianguangia sinica, Chengjiangopenna wangii, and Galeaplumosus abilus, and then assembled into one proposed species, X. sinica, in 2017. The animal was polyp-like, its gastric cavity divided by septa; it had a second body cavity in its holdfast, and densely-plumed feather-like tentacles, implying that it was a suspension feeder. Early cnidarians were probably also benthic suspension feeders, unlike later mainly predatory cnidarians.

== See also ==
- Daihua
- Dinomischus
