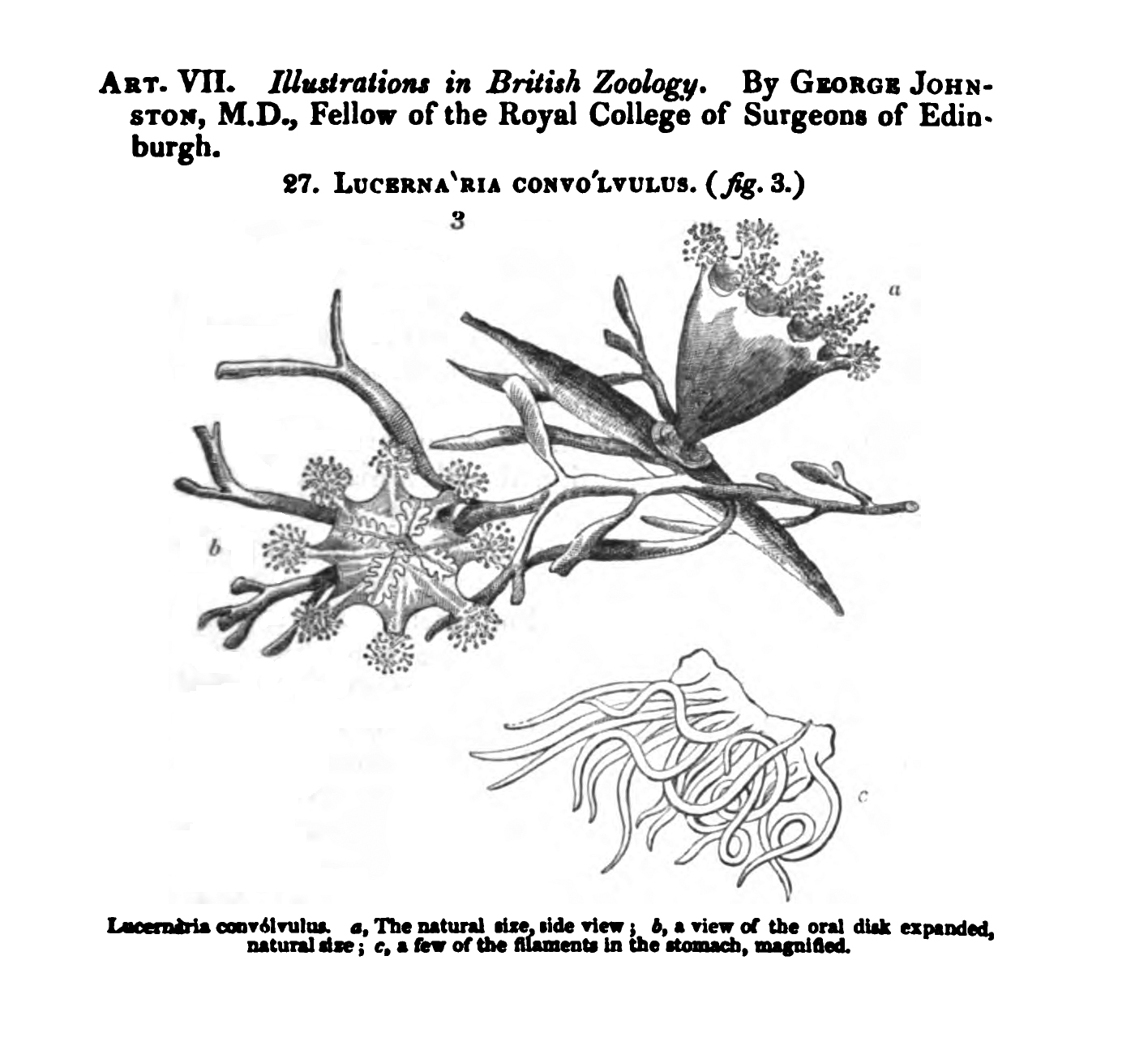
- Illustration of Craterolophus convolvulus, formerly called Lucernaria convulvus

Scientific classification
- Domain: Eukaryota
- Kingdom: Animalia
- Phylum: Cnidaria
- Class: Staurozoa
- Order: Stauromedusae
- Suborder: Amyostaurida
- Family: Craterolophidae; Uchida, 1929
- Genus: Craterolophus; James-Clark, 1863

Species
- Craterolophus convolvulus Johnston, 1835; Craterolophus macrocystis von Lendenfeld, 1884

= Craterolophus =

Genus of jellyfishes

Craterolophus is a genus of jellyfish. It is the only genus in the monotypic family Craterolophidae. Species of this genus are characterized by the absence of primary tentacles, as well as the absence of longitudinal muscles running along the peduncle.
