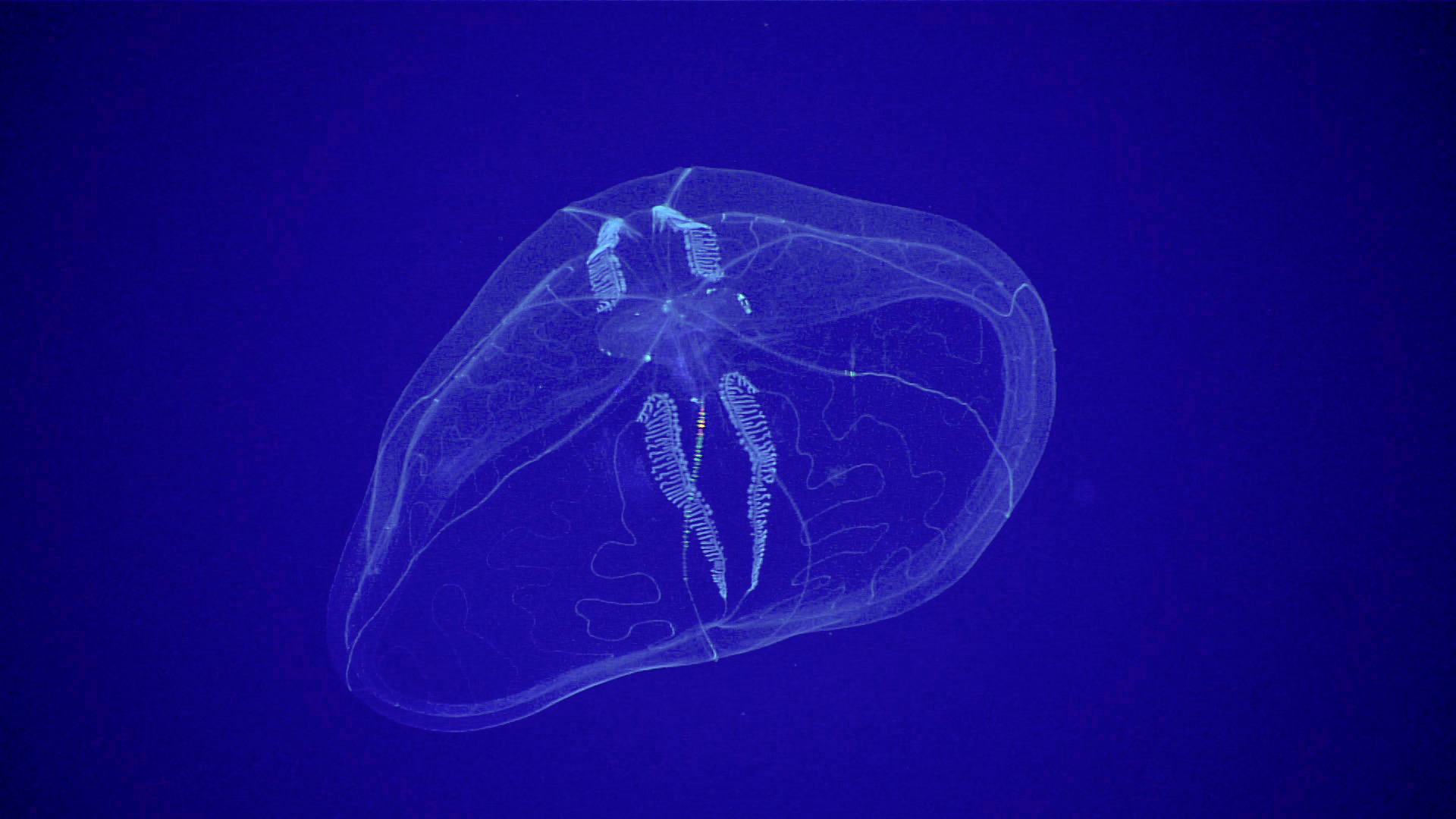

Scientific classification
- Kingdom: Animalia
- Phylum: Ctenophora
- Class: Tentaculata
- Order: Thalassocalycida; Madin & Harbison, 1978
- Family: Thalassocalycidae; Madin & Harbison, 1978
- Genus: Thalassocalyce; Madin & Harbison, 1978
- Species: T. inconstans

Binomial name
- Thalassocalyce inconstans Madin & Harbison, 1978

= Thalassocalyce =

Thalassocalyce inconstans

Genus of ctenophores

Thalassocalyce is a genus of ctenophore, or comb jellies, known from the California coast, the Gulf of Mexico, and the western Atlantic. It is represented by a single species, Thalassocalyce inconstans, which is the only species in the family Thalassocalycidae and the order Thalassocalycida. T. inconstans is a pelagic ctenophore typically occurring in upper-mesopelagic depths, but has been observed at depths up to 3,500 m in Monterey Canyon.

Due to their fragility, gelatinous zooplankton are inherently difficult to sample by traditional methods (i.e. net tows), and among ctenophorans Thalassocalyce inconstans is especially fragile having thin, flaccid tissues, likely contributing to broad under-sampling. The individual collection of undamaged specimens via scuba and novel instrumentation (e.g. Remotely Operated Vehicles, submersibles, and imaging systems) has allowed for more robust investigation of T. inconstans.

== Morphology ==
Thalassocalycid morphology is unique within the Ctenophora, sharing certain similarities to both cydippid (i.e. canal structure) and lobates, and characterized by absence of auricles and muscular lobes. Rather, unmuscular lobes are fused into a continuous dome forming a medusa-like body plan. While morphologically and structurally distinct from the oral lobes of lobate ctenophores, the thin thalassocalycid bell is functionally analogous as mechanism for prey-capture. When fully expanded, the body forms a hemispherical bell, but a bi-radial (“two-globe”) morphology is apparent when the organisms is partially contracted. The function of fully developed tentacles that do not extend outside of the “bell” has not been resolved. Several lobate ctenophores, (e.g. Leucothea multicornis) pass through larval stages that are ‘medusiform,’ but the retention of a medusoid-like bauplan in adults is unique to Thalassocalyce inconstans. Initial description of this species overturned suggestions that T. inconstans was a larval form of species already described. Auricle-free ctenophorans are known from the deep-sea, but these species have not yet been described due to sampling obstacles.

== Foraging ==
Thalassocalyce inconstans is a predatory ctenophore that feeds on euphausiid krill and small crustaceans. A passive foraging mechanism is employed, whereby T. inconstans ‘fishes’ for prey with its bell expanded. Prey that come into contact with foraging (bell-expanded) T. inconstans stimulate the rapid contraction of the bell, and are trapped within a mucus-covered inner surface.
