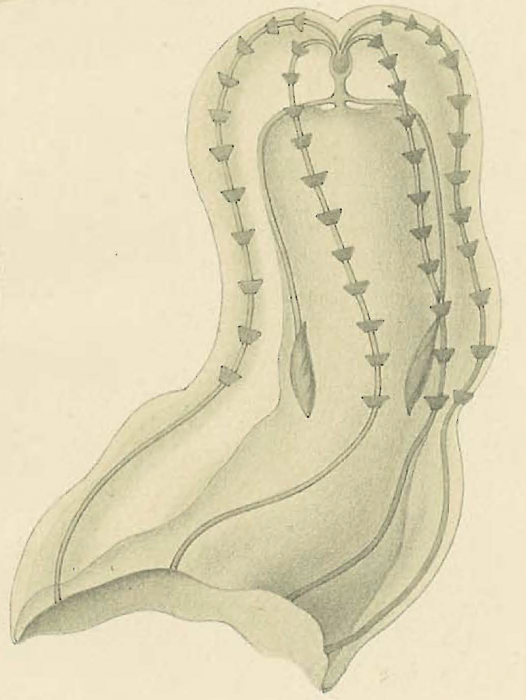
- Ganesha Elegans, previously denoted as Lampetia Elegans

Scientific classification
- Kingdom: Animalia
- Phylum: Ctenophora
- Class: Tentaculata
- Order: Ganeshida; Moser, 1908
- Family: Ganeshidae; Moser, 1907
- Genus: Ganesha; Moser, 1907

= Ganesha (ctenophore) =

Genus of comb jellies

Ganesha is a genus of comb jellies. It is the only genus in the monotypic family Ganeshidae and the order Ganeshida. They are characterized by pair of small lobes round the mouth, and extended pharynx. Two species are currently recognized: Ganesha elegans and Ganesha annamita.
