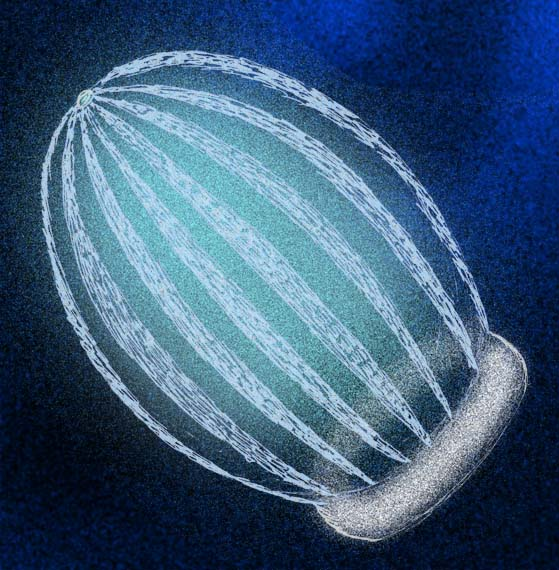
- Artist's reconstruction

Scientific classification
- Kingdom: Animalia
- Phylum: Ctenophora
- Genus: †Xanioascus; Conway Morris & Collins, 1996
- Species: †X. canadensis

Binomial name
- †Xanioascus canadensis Conway Morris & Collins, 1996

= Xanioascus =

Xanioascus Temporal range: 515–505 Ma

Extinct genus of comb jellies

Xanioascus canadensis is an extinct ctenophore, known from the Burgess Shale in British Columbia, Canada. The species, which is about 515 to 505 million years old, had 24 comb rows - in contrast to all modern forms which have only 8.

Other important Cambrian ctenophore fossils are Fasciculus vesanus and Ctenorhabdotus capulus.
