= Circumesophageal nerve ring =

Nerve structure around pharynx in invertebrates

A diagram of a hypothetical ancestral mollusc with its nerve ring shown on the left side of the image

A circumesophageal or circumpharyngeal nerve ring is an arrangement of nerve ganglia around the foregut (esophagus or pharynx) of an animal. It is a common feature of nematodes, molluscs and many other bilaterian invertebrates, but is absent in all vertebrates and is not structurally possible in simpler invertebrates such as water bears.

The nerve ring, also called a nerve collar, creates a complete and closed loop around the food-entry parts of the animal's anatomy. In a typical molluscan nervous system, these include the cerebral, pedal, and pleural ganglia, with the esophagus passing through the center of the ring.

- Protostomes
  - In nematodes, the ring consists of only two to four large associative cells connected to two paired lateral ganglia, two ventral ganglia, and a single unpaired dorsal ganglion.
  - Among arthropods, the usual arrangement is a single ganglion (the cerebral) positioned above the esophagus, a single ganglion or nerve mass (the subesophageal) below it, and commissures connecting the two in a ring.
  - Among the gastropods, the evolutionary torsion event which relocates the anus to near the head of the animal and allowing it to withdraw into its shell has relocated the commissure of the pleural ganglia into a "twist" (the right ganglion has relocated to the left side, and the left ganglion to the right).
- Deuterostomes
  - Echinoderms have a nerve ring at the center that connects the per-arm nerve nets.

== Other nerve rings ==
Cnidaria, which is not part of the Bilateria and has no central nervous system to speak of (instead having diffuse nerve nets), some groups (the sea anemone larva, the Hydrozoan medusa) have up to two ring-shaped concentrations of neurons and axons around the pharynx or interconnecting the rhopalia in immature stages of growth, functioning as a partly centralized nervous system. This consists a blastoporal ring.

Water bears do have a circumesophageal component to their nervous system, but it is very much unclear whether it should count as part of the stomodeumal nervous system or the brain – it is possible that the brain itself is ring-shaped. The Cycloneuralia are considered to have circumesophageal brains in this context.
