= Galeactena =

Galeactena Temporal range: Cambrian Stage 3

Scientific classification
- Kingdom: Animalia
- Phylum: Ctenophora
- Class: †Scleroctenophora
- Genus: †Galeactena; Ou et al., 2015
- Species: †G. hemispherica

Binomial name
- †Galeactena hemispherica Ou et al., 2015

Extinct genus of comb jellies

Galeactena is an extinct genus of scleroctenophoran comb jellies (members of the phylum Ctenophora) that lived during the early Cambrian period as a member of the Chengjiang biota. This genus only contains one species, Galeactena hemispherica, making it monotypic.

It was a planktonic genus, drifting through the ocean and filter feeding.

== Description ==
The anatomy of Galeactena is globose, bearing resemblance to an upside-down garlic bulb. All specimens of Galeactena have a consistent vaulted hemispherical shape with little evidence of its body being twisted or distorted. It has eight rows of cilia which it uses to propel through the water. The body of Galeactena and its apical organ is supported by a external organic skeleton.

== Taxonomy ==
This genus is a member of the taxonomic class Scleroctenophora, making it related to genera such as Batofasciculus. However it was most closely related to genera such as Maotianoascus.
