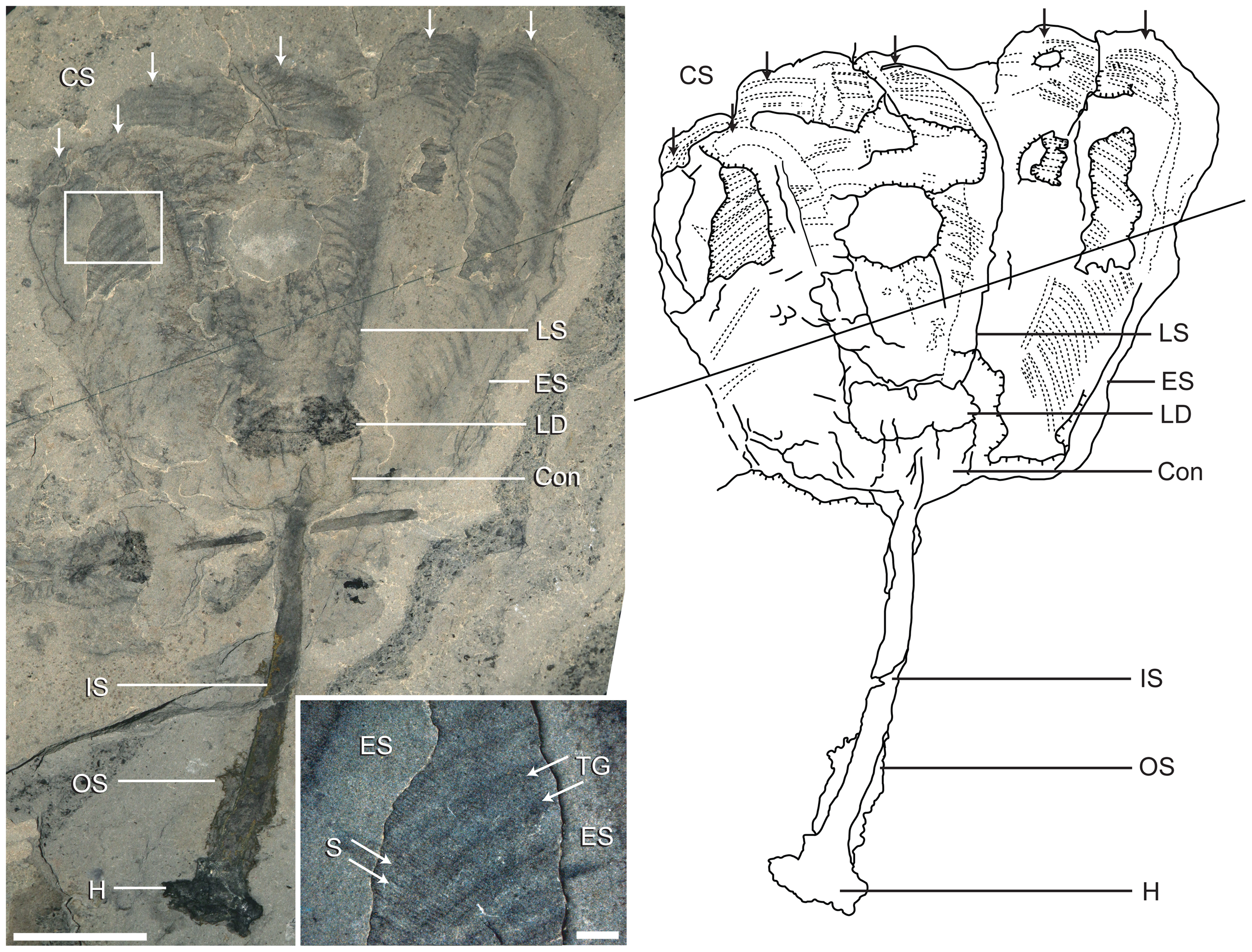
- Holotype of S. gregarium
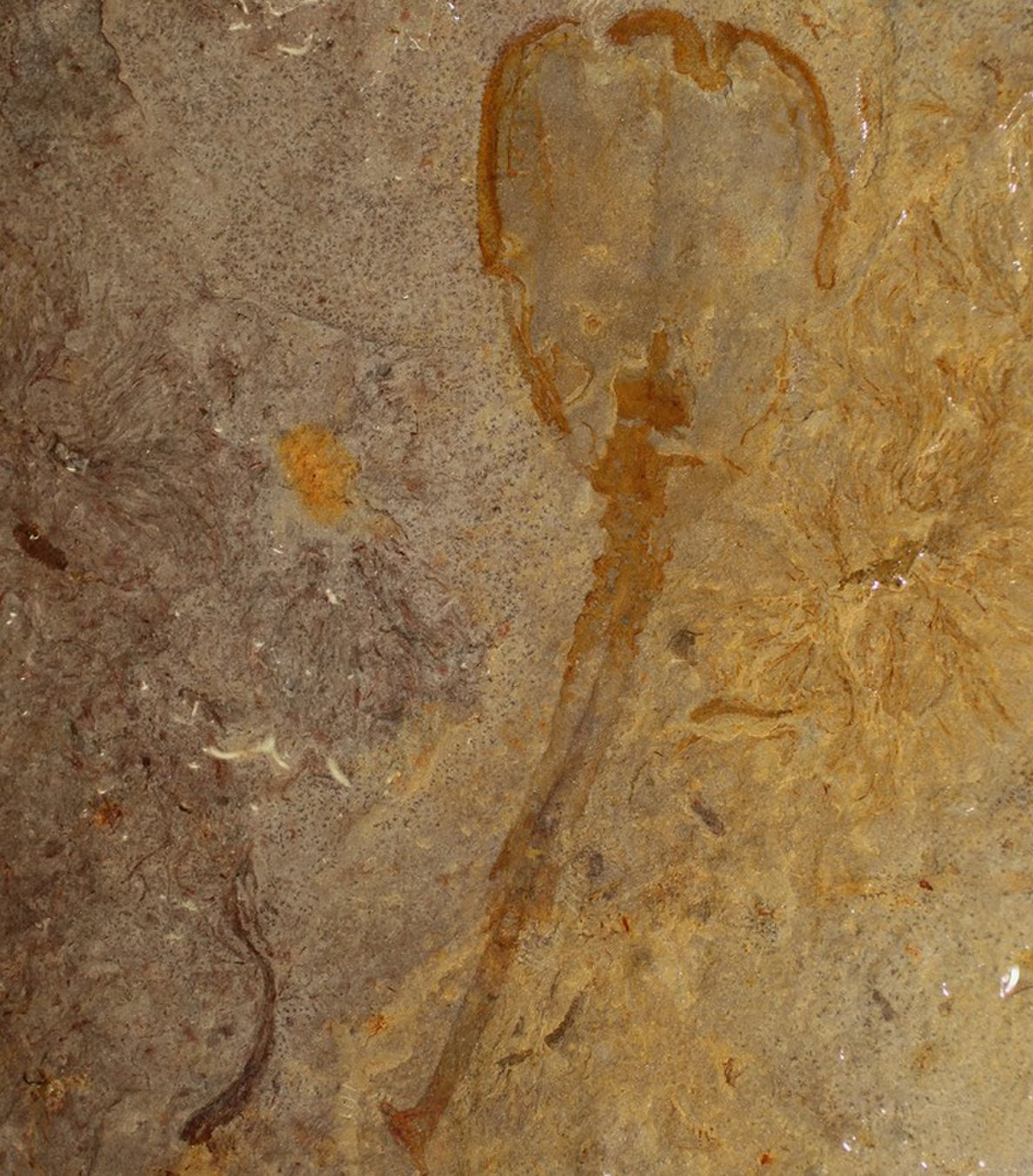
- Fossil of S. lloydguntheri

Scientific classification
- Kingdom: Animalia
- Phylum: Ctenophora
- Stem group: Ctenophora
- Family: †Siphusauctidae; O'Brien & Caron, 2012
- Genus: †Siphusauctum; O'Brien & Caron, 2012

Species
- †S. gregarium O'Brien & Caron, 2012 (type); †S. lloydguntheri Kimmig, Strotz & Lieberman, 2017

= Siphusauctum =

Siphusauctum Temporal range: Middle Cambrian

Cambrian animal genus

Siphusauctum, is an extinct genus of filter-feeding animals that lived during the Middle Cambrian. It was sessile, anchored to the sediment with a stalk. Originally suggested to be a bilaterian of uncertain affinities, it is now considered likely to be an early primitive relative of ctenophores (comb jellies).

== Description ==
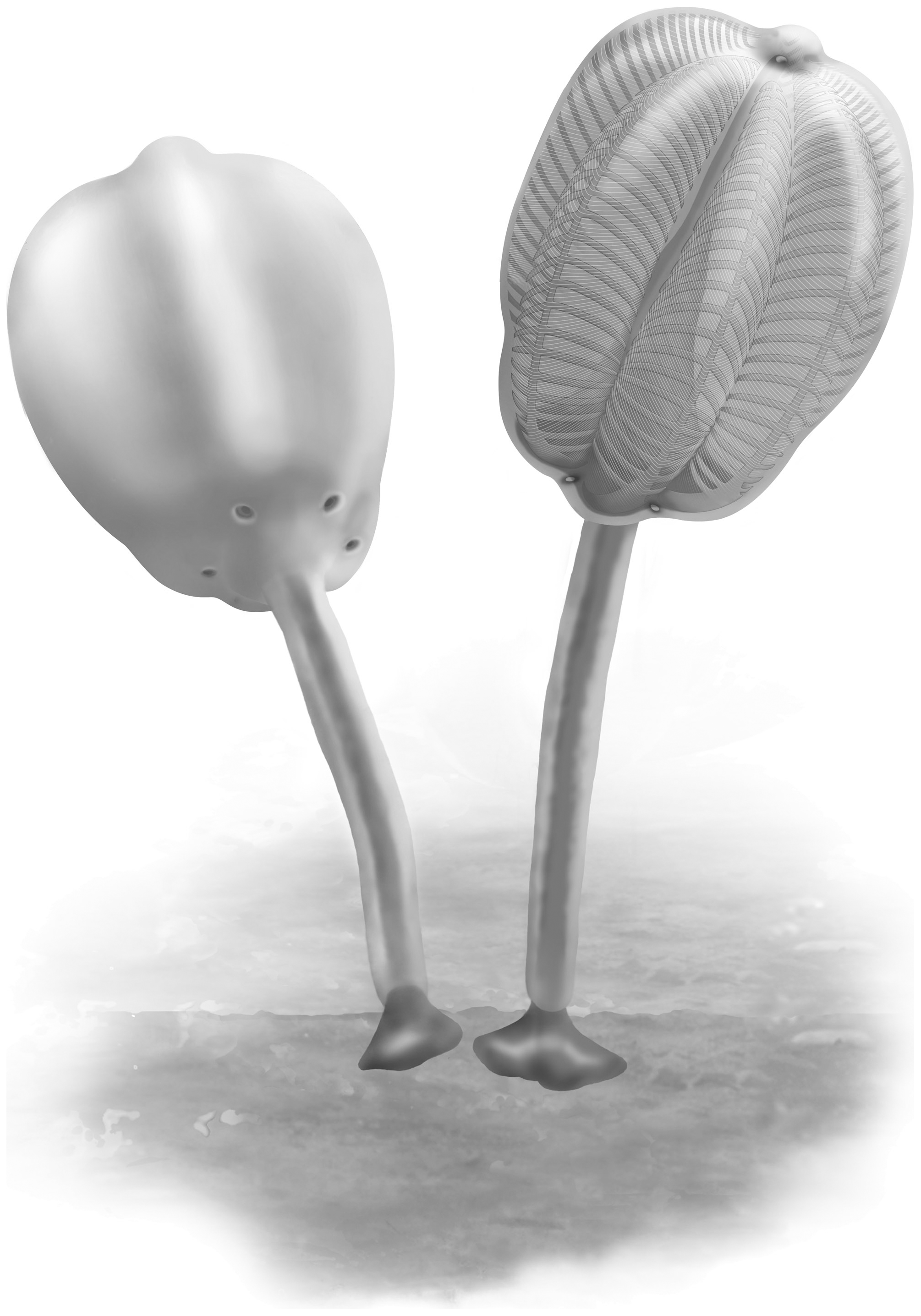
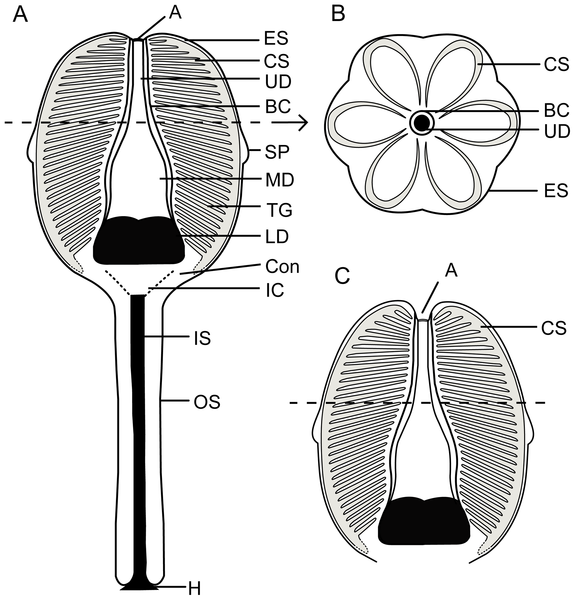
Life restoration and internal diagram of S. gregarium

Siphusauctum was a sessile animal that was attached to the substrate by a holdfast. It had a tulip-shaped body, called the calyx, into which it actively pumped water that entered through pores and filtered out and digested organic contents. It grew to a length of only about 20 cm (7.9 in). It is suggested to have primarily consumed microplankton.

== Taxonomy ==
=== Species ===
Siphusauctum gregarium was described in 2012 from numerous fossils recovered from the "Tulip Beds" strata of the Burgess Shale of Yoho National Park, British Columbia, Canada. The generic name comes Latin siphus ("cup" or "goblet") and auctus ("large"), referring to the general shape and size of the animal. The specific epithet comes from Latin gregalis ("flock" or "herd") referring to the large numbers of specimens recovered. This species is colloquially referred to as the "Tulip Animal" due to its similar shape to the flower, and this colloquial name is also where the Tulip Beds derived their name from, due to the abundance of Siphusauctum fossils found there.

In 2017 a new species, Siphusauctum lloydguntheri, was reported from the Middle Cambrian Spence Shale of Utah.

=== Affinity ===
In its original 2012 description, Siphusauctum was placed as the only member of the family Siphusauctidae, and suggested to have affinities with Bilateria, due to the suggestion that it possessed a digestive tract and anus, characteristic of the group. However, later studies suggested that it was likely a member of the stem-group of Ctenophora (comb jellies) instead, due to sharing characteristic large cillia structures with the group. While living members of Ctenophora are typically free-living pelagic animals, other suggested members of the ctenophore stem-group, like Dinomischus, Daihua and Xianguangia are also sessile filter feeders.
