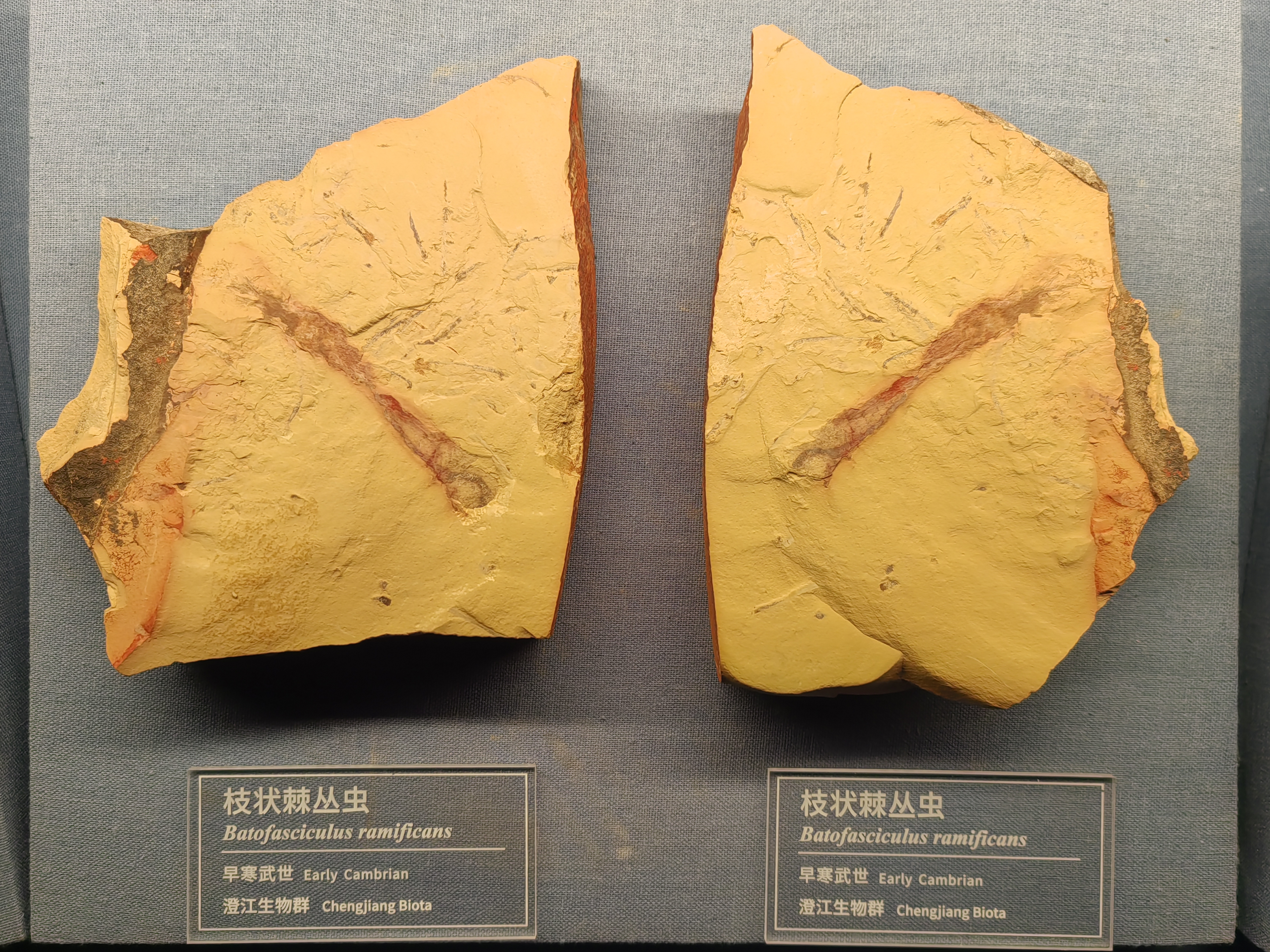
- Fossil of Batofasciculus ramificans from the Chengjiang Fossil Site World Natural Heritage Museum.

Scientific classification
- Kingdom: Animalia
- Phylum: Ctenophora
- Class: †Scleroctenophora
- Genus: †Batofasciculus; Hou et al., 1999
- Species: †B. ramificans

Binomial name
- †Batofasciculus ramificans Hou et al., 1999

= Batofasciculus =

Batofasciculus Temporal range: Cambrian Stage 3

Extinct genus of comb jellies

Batofasciculus is an extinct genus of scleroctenophoran comb jellies (members of the phylum Ctenophora). It lived during the early Cambrian period as a member of the Chengjiang biota. This genus currently only contains one species, Batofasciculus ramificans, making it monotypic.

== Taxonomy ==
When this genus was originally described by Hou et al. 1999, it was classified with an uncertain phylogenetic placement. However it was tentatively classed as a ctenophore due to features such as an aboral dome-like structure and its eight lobes. New fossil material of Batofasciculus was able to assert this genus ctenophoran affinity by revealing a statolith in the apical organ and an oral region.

Phylogenetic analysis of this genus has shown that it is a member of the class Scleroctenophora. This places it as a close relative of Trigoides and Gemmactena.
