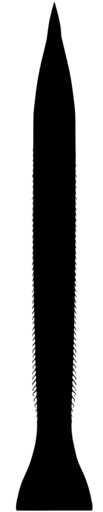
- Thaumactena ensis

Scientific classification
- Kingdom: Animalia
- Phylum: Ctenophora
- Class: †Scleroctenophora
- Genus: †Thaumactena; Ou et al., 2015
- Species: †T. ensis

Binomial name
- †Thaumactena ensis Ou et al., 2015

= Thaumactena =

Thaumactena Temporal range: Cambrian Stage 3, ~520 Ma

Extinct genus of stem-group ctenophores

Thaumactena is an extinct monotypic genus of scleroctenophoran (a type of stem-group ctenophore) that lived during Cambrian Stage 3, around 520 Ma. The type and only species is Thaumactena ensis.

== Description ==
Two specimens are known, the holotype (ELEL-SJ081427A, an adult), and the paratype (ELEL-SJ081563, a juvenile), both having a length-width ratio of 10:1. The oral region expands outward, forming an "oral skirt." Thaumactena is distinguished from other scleroctenophorans by the possession of a streamlined body, similar to chaetognaths (arrow worms), suggesting that, in life, it was an agile swimmer.

== Phylogeny ==
Thaumactena is placed in the Scleroctenophora, as it and other members of the class possess an internal skeleton.

== See also ==
- Chengjiang biota
