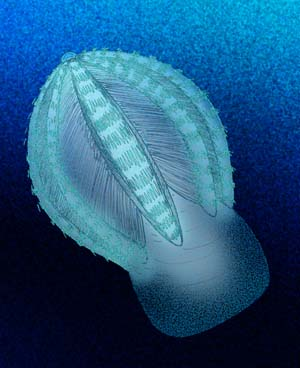
- Artist’s reconstruction of Maotianoascus octonarius

Scientific classification
- Kingdom: Animalia
- Phylum: Ctenophora
- Class: †Scleroctenophora; Ou et al., 2015

Genera
- †Batofasciculus; †Galeactena; †Gemmactena; †Thaumactena; †Maotianoascus; †Trigoides

= Scleroctenophora =

Scleroctenophora Temporal range: Cambrian Stage 3

Extinct class of comb jellies

Scleroctenophora is an extinct class of stem group ctenophores, known from the Chinese Maotianshan shales of Yunnan. It is dated to Cambrian Stage 3 and belongs to late Early Cambrian strata. Scleroctenophorans are easily distinguished from other ctenophores by the presence of an internal non-mineralized skeleton that supports the body.
