= Gemmactena =

Gemmactena Temporal range: Cambrian Stage 3

Scientific classification
- Kingdom: Animalia
- Phylum: Ctenophora
- Class: †Scleroctenophora
- Genus: †Gemmactena; Ou et al., 2015
- Species: †G. actinala

Binomial name
- †Gemmactena actinala Ou et al., 2015

Extinct genus of comb jellies

Gemmactena is an extinct, monospecific genus of scleroctenophoran that lived during Cambrian Stage 3, containing a single species, Gemmactena actinala.

== Distribution ==
Gemmactena is known from the Heilinpu Formation of China.
