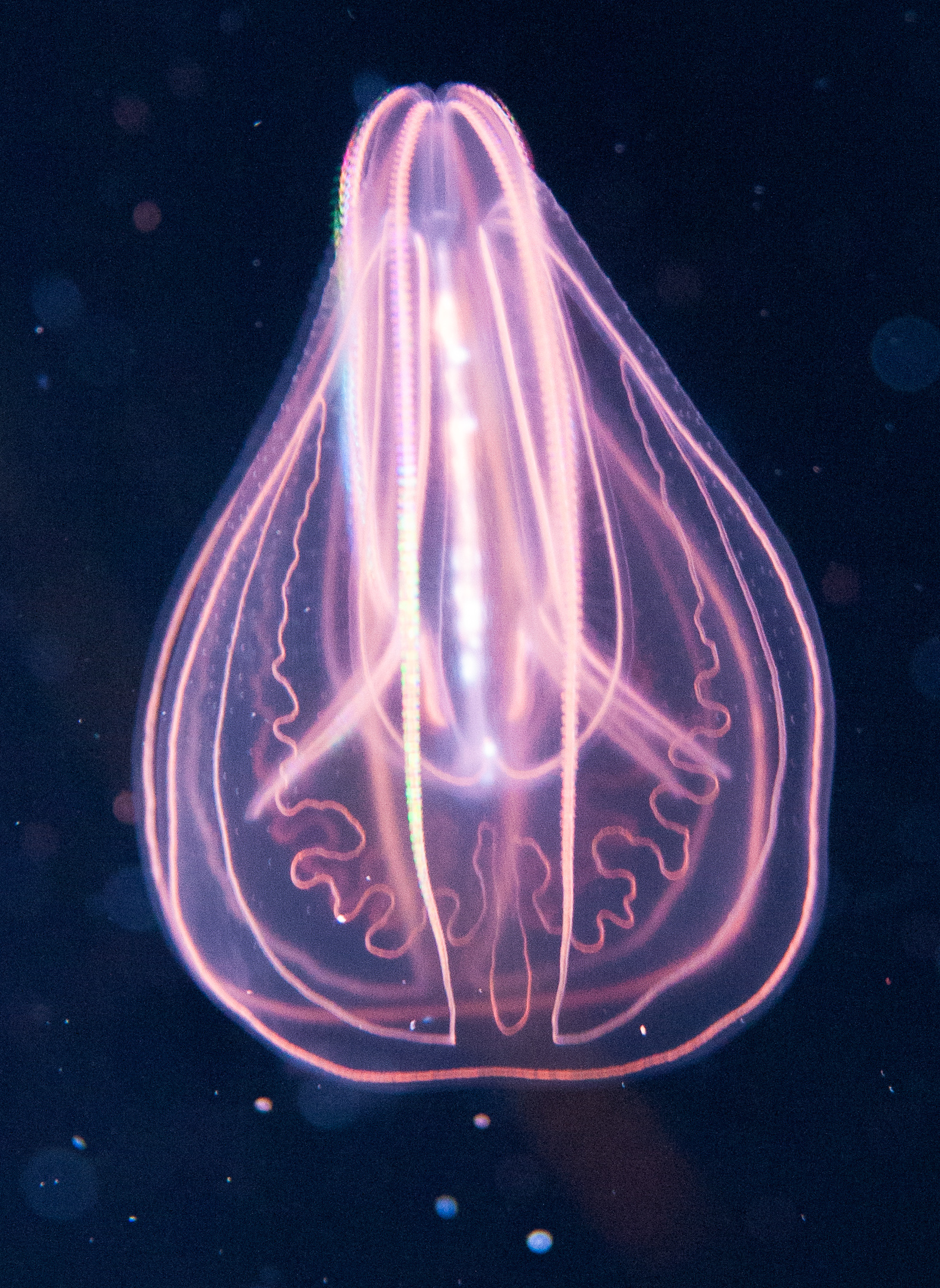

Scientific classification
- Kingdom: Animalia
- Subkingdom: Eumetazoa
- Phylum: Ctenophora; Eschscholtz, 1829

Classes
- †Edrathina; †Dinomischidae; †Siphusauctidae; †Scleroctenophora; Tentaculata; Nuda

= Ctenophora =

Comb jellies Temporal range: Ediacaran–Present, 551–0 Ma

Phylum of gelatinous marine animals

Ctenophora (/təˈnɒfərə/; from Ancient Greek κτείς (kteis) 'comb' and φέρω (pherō) 'to carry') or ctenophores (/ˈtɛnəfɔːr, ˈtiːnə-/), commonly known as comb jellies, is a basal phylum of marine invertebrate animals notable for their unique aquatic locomotion using groups of cilia (commonly referred to as "combs"). They inhabit marine habitats worldwide, with 186 recognised living species.

Ctenophores are the largest animals to swim with cilia, with adult ctenophores range from a few millimeters to 1.5 m (5 ft) in size depending on the species. Their bodies consist of a mass of jelly (mesoglea) with a two-cell-thick layer on the outside, and another lining the internal cavity. The phylum has a wide range of body forms, including the egg-shaped cydippids with a pair of retractable tentacles that capture prey; the flat, generally combless platyctenids; and the large-mouthed beroids, which prey on other ctenophores.

Almost all ctenophores are predators, feeding on prey ranging from microscopic larvae and rotifers to the adults of small crustaceans; the exceptions are juveniles of two species, which live as parasites on the salps on which adults of their species feed.

Despite their soft, gelatinous bodies, fossils thought to represent ctenophores appear in Lagerstätten (well-preserved fossil beds) dating as far back as the early Cambrian, about 525 million years ago, though stem-group ctenophores that were attached by a stalk to the seafloor may extend back as far as the Ediacaran, around 550 million years ago. The position of the ctenophores in the "tree of life" has long been debated in molecular phylogenetics studies. Biologists proposed that ctenophores constitute the second-earliest branching animal lineage, with sponges being the sister-group to all other multicellular animals (Porifera sister hypothesis). Other biologists contend that ctenophores diverged earlier than sponges (Ctenophora sister hypothesis), which themselves appeared before the split between cnidarians and bilaterians. Pisani et al. reanalyzed the data and suggested that the computer algorithms used for analysis were misled by the presence of specific ctenophore genes that were markedly different from those of other species. However, follow up analysis by Whelan et al. (2017) yielded support for the 'Ctenophora sister' hypothesis; the issue remains a matter of taxonomic dispute. Schultz et al. (2023) found irreversible changes in synteny in the sister of the Ctenophora, the Myriazoa, consisting of the rest of the animals.

Spotted comb jelly

== Etymology ==
The New Latin name Ctenophora is constructed from Ancient Greek κτείς (kteis) 'comb' and φέρω (pherō) 'to carry', alluding to the rows of cilia that are distinctive features of animals in the phylum.

== Distinguishing features ==
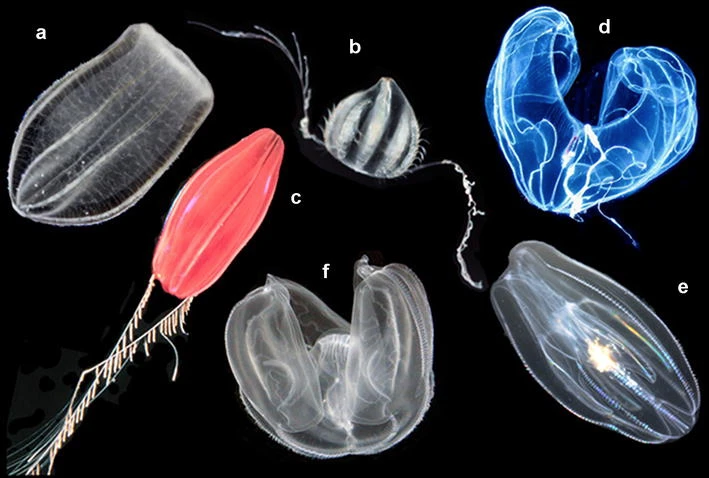
Pelagic ctenophores a Beroe ovata, b unidentified cydippid, c "Tortugas red" cydippid, d Bathocyroe fosteri, e Mnemiopsis leidyi, and f Ocyropsis sp.

Ctenophores are distinguished from all other animals by having colloblasts, which are sticky and adhere to prey, although a few ctenophore species lack them.

Like cnidarians, ctenophores have two main layers of cells that sandwich a middle layer of jelly-like material, which is called the mesoglea in cnidarians and ctenophores; more complex animals have three main cell layers and no intermediate jelly-like layer. Hence ctenophores and cnidarians have traditionally been labelled diploblastic. Both ctenophores and cnidarians have a type of muscle that, in more complex animals, arises from the middle cell layer, and as a result some text books classify ctenophores as triploblastic, while others still regard them as diploblastic. The comb jellies have more than 80 different cell types, exceeding the numbers from other groups like placozoans, sponges, cnidarians, and some deep-branching bilaterians.

Ranging from about 1 millimeter (0.04 in) to 1.5 meters (5 ft) in size, ctenophores are the largest non-colonial animals that use cilia as their main method of locomotion. Most species have eight strips, called comb rows, that run the length of their bodies and bear comb-like bands of cilia, called "ctenes", stacked along the comb rows so that when the cilia beat, those of each comb touch the comb below. The name "ctenophora" means "comb-bearing", from the Greek κτείς (stem-form κτεν-) meaning "comb" and the Greek suffix -φορος meaning "carrying".

Comparison with other major animal groups
	Sponges	Cnidarians	Ctenophores	Bilateria
Cnidocytes	No	Yes	Only in some species (obtained from ingested cnidarians)	
microRNA	Yes		No	Yes
Hox genes	No	Yes	No	Yes
Colloblasts	No		In most species	No
Digestive and circulatory organs	No			Yes
Anal pores	No		Yes	Mostly Yes
Number of main cell layers	Two, with jelly-like layer between them		Debate about whether two or three	Three
Cells in each layer bound together	No, except that Homoscleromorpha have basement membranes	Yes: Inter-cell connections; basement membranes		
Sensory organs	No	Yes		
Eyes (e.g. ocelli)	Larval forms have light sensing organs	Yes	No	Yes
Apical organ	No	Yes		In species with primary ciliated larvae
Cell abundance in middle "jelly" layer	Many	Few		[not applicable]
Outer layer cells	can move inwards and change functions	do not move or change		[not applicable]
Nervous system	No	Yes, simple		Simple to complex
Muscles	None	Mostly epitheliomuscular	Mostly myoepithelial	Mostly myocytes

== Description ==
Comb jelly, Shedd Aquarium, Chicago

For a phylum with relatively few species, ctenophores have a wide range of body plans. Coastal species need to be tough enough to withstand waves and swirling sediment particles, while some oceanic species are so fragile that it is very difficult to capture them intact for study. In addition, oceanic species do not preserve well, and are known mainly from photographs and from observers' notes. Hence most attention has until recently concentrated on three coastal genera – Pleurobrachia, Beroe and Mnemiopsis. At least two textbooks base their descriptions of ctenophores on the cydippid Pleurobrachia.

Since the body of many species is almost radially symmetrical, the main axis is oral to aboral (from the mouth to the opposite end). However, since only two of the canals near the statocyst terminate in anal pores, ctenophores have no mirror-symmetry, although many have rotational symmetry. In other words, if the animal rotates in a half-circle it looks the same as when it started.

=== Body layers ===
Anatomy of Cydippid Ctenophore

Like those of cnidarians, (jellyfish, sea anemones, etc.), ctenophores' bodies consist of a relatively thick, jelly-like mesoglea sandwiched between two epithelia, layers of cells bound by inter-cell connections and by a fibrous basement membrane that they secrete. The epithelia of ctenophores have two layers of cells rather than one, and some of the cells in the upper layer have several cilia per cell.

The outer layer of the epidermis (outer skin) consists of: sensory cells; cells that secrete mucus, which protects the body; and interstitial cells, which can transform into other types of cell. In specialized parts of the body, the outer layer contains colloblasts along the surface of tentacles, used in capturing prey, or cells bearing multiple large cilia for locomotion. The inner layer of the epidermis contains a nerve net, and myoepithelial cells that act as muscles.

The internal cavity forms: a mouth that can usually be closed by muscles; a pharynx ("throat"); a wider area in the center that acts as a stomach; and a system of internal canals. These branch through the mesoglea to the most active parts of the animal. The inner surface of the cavity is lined with an epithelium, the gastrodermis. The mouth and pharynx have both cilia and muscles. In other parts of the canal system, the gastrodermis is different on the sides nearest to and furthest from the organ that it supplies. The nearer side is composed of tall nutritive cells that store nutrients in vacuoles (internal compartments), germ cells that produce eggs or sperm, and photocytes that produce bioluminescence. The side furthest from the organ is covered with ciliated cells that circulate water through the canals, punctuated by ciliary rosettes, pores surrounded by double whorls of cilia and connected to the mesoglea.

=== Feeding, excretion and respiration ===
When prey is swallowed, it is liquefied in the pharynx by enzymes and muscular contractions of the pharynx. The resulting slurry is wafted through the canal system by the beating of the cilia, and digested by the nutritive cells. The ciliary rosettes may help to transport nutrients to muscles in the mesoglea. The anal pores may eject unwanted small particles, but most unwanted matter is regurgitated via the mouth.

Little is known about how ctenophores get rid of waste products produced by the cells. The ciliary rosettes in the gastrodermis may help to remove wastes from the mesoglea, and may also help to adjust the animal's buoyancy by pumping water into or out of the mesoglea.

=== Locomotion ===
The outer surface bears usually eight comb rows, called swimming-plates, which are used for swimming. The rows are oriented to run from near the mouth (the "oral pole") to the opposite end (the "aboral pole"), and are spaced more or less evenly around the body, although spacing patterns vary by species and in most species the comb rows extend only part of the distance from the aboral pole towards the mouth. The "combs" (also called "ctenes" or "comb plates") run across each row, and each consists of thousands of unusually long cilia, up to 2 millimeters (0.08 in). Unlike conventional cilia and flagella, which has a filament structure arranged in a 9 + 2 pattern, these cilia are arranged in a 9 + 3 pattern, where the extra compact filament is suspected to have a supporting function. These normally beat so that the propulsion stroke is away from the mouth, although they can also reverse direction. Hence ctenophores usually swim in the direction in which the mouth is eating, unlike jellyfish.

It is uncertain how ctenophores control their buoyancy, but some species rely on osmotic pressure to adapt to water of different densities. Their body fluids are normally as concentrated as seawater. If they enter less dense brackish water, the ciliary rosettes may pump this into the mesoglea to maintain buoyancy. Conversely, if they move from brackish to full-strength seawater, the rosettes may pump water out of the mesoglea.

=== Nervous system and senses ===
Ctenophores have no brain or central nervous system, but have a subepidermal nerve net that forms a ring round the mouth and is densest near structures such as the comb rows, pharynx, tentacles and the sensory complex furthest from the mouth. Nerve cells communicate by two different methods; some of the neurons have synaptic connections, but those in the nerve net are highly distinctive by being fused into a syncytium. Fossils show that Cambrian species had a more complex nervous system, with long nerves which connected with a ring around the mouth. The only ctenophores with long nerves today is Euplokamis in the order Cydippida. Their nerve cells arise from the same progenitor cells as the colloblasts.

In addition, there is a less organized mesogleal nerve net consisting of single neurites. The largest single sensory feature is the aboral organ (at the opposite end from the mouth), which is underlined with its own nerve net., and detects motion, light, and pressure and coordinates ciliary movements. Its main component is a statocyst, a balance sensor consisting of a statolith, a tiny grain of calcium carbonate, supported on four bundles of cilia, called "balancers", that sense its orientation. The statocyst is protected by a transparent dome of long, immobile cilia. A ctenophore does not automatically try to keep the statolith resting equally on all the balancers. Instead, its response is determined by the animal's "mood", in other words, the overall state of the nervous system. For example, if a ctenophore with trailing tentacles captures prey, it often puts some comb rows into reverse, spinning the mouth towards the prey.

Reconstruction of the aboral organ in Mnemiopsis leidyi identified three multinucleate aboral nerve-net neurons, distinct from the body-wall subepithelial nerve net, that synapse onto balancer cells and form reciprocal connections across the statocyst with bridge cells. The balancer cells themselves lack presynaptic sites, and no synaptic path connects them to motor effectors such as comb-plate cells. This suggests a coordinating rather than sensory–motor role for the nerve net. The organ itself consisted of about 900 cells and 17 distinct cell types.

The ciliated larvae in cnidarians and bilaterians appear to share an ancient and common origin. The larvae's apical organ is involved in the formation of the nervous system. The aboral organ of comb jellies is not homologous with the apical organ in other animals, and the formation of their nervous system has therefore a different embryonic origin.

Ctenophore nerve cells and nervous system have distinctive biochemistry. They lack the genes and enzymes required to manufacture neurotransmitters like serotonin, dopamine, nitric oxide, octopamine, noradrenaline, and others, seen in all other animals with a nervous system, with the genes coding for the receptors for each of these neurotransmitters missing. Monofunctional catalase (CAT), one of the three major families of antioxidant enzymes that target hydrogen peroxide, an important signaling molecule for synaptic and neuronal activity, is also absent, most likely due to gene loss. They use L-glutamate as a neurotransmitter, and have a distinctively high number of ionotropic glutamate receptors and genes for glutamate synthesis and transport. The genomic content of the nervous system is the smallest of any animal, and could represent the minimum genetic requirements for a functional nervous system. The presence of directly fused neurons without synapses suggests that ctenophores might form a sister group to other metazoans, having developed a nervous system independently. If so, nervous systems may have either been lost in sponges and placozoans, or arisen more than once among metazoans.

=== Reproduction and development ===
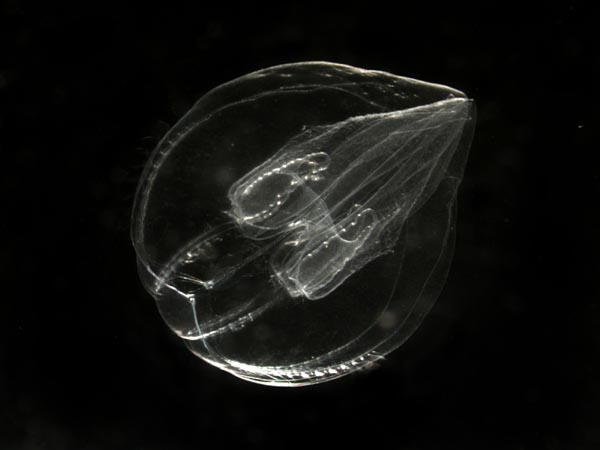
Cydippid larva of Bolinopsis sp., a few millimetres long

Adults of most species can regenerate tissues that are damaged or removed, although only platyctenids reproduce by cloning, splitting off from the edges of their flat bodies fragments that develop into new individuals. Lab research on Mnemiopsis leidyi also show that when two individuals have parts of their bodies removed, they are able to fuse together, including their nervous and digestive systems, even when the two individuals are genetically different; a phenomenon so far only found in comb jellies.

The last common ancestor (LCA) of the ctenophores was hermaphroditic. Some are simultaneous hermaphrodites, which can produce both eggs and sperm at the same time, while others are sequential hermaphrodites, in which the eggs and sperm mature at different times. There is no metamorphosis. At least three species are known to have evolved separate sexes (dioecy); Ocyropsis crystallina and Ocyropsis maculata in the genus Ocyropsis and Bathocyroe fosteri in the genus Bathocyroe. The gonads are located in the parts of the internal canal network under the comb rows, and eggs and sperm are released via pores in the epidermis. Fertilization is generally external, but platyctenids use internal fertilization and keep the eggs in brood chambers until they hatch. Self-fertilization has occasionally been seen in species of the genus Mnemiopsis, and most hermaphroditic species are presumed to be self-fertile.

Development of the fertilized eggs is direct; there is no distinctive larval form. Juveniles of all groups are generally planktonic, and most species resemble miniature adult cydippids, gradually developing their adult body forms as they grow. In the genus Beroe, however, the juveniles have large mouths and, like the adults, lack both tentacles and tentacle sheaths. In some groups, such as the flat, bottom-dwelling platyctenids, the juveniles behave more like true larvae. They live among the plankton and thus occupy a different ecological niche from their parents, only attaining the adult form by a more radical ontogeny after dropping to the sea-floor.

At least in some species, juvenile ctenophores appear capable of producing small quantities of eggs and sperm while they are well below adult size, and adults produce eggs and sperm for as long as they have sufficient food. If they run short of food, they first stop producing eggs and sperm, and then shrink in size. When the food supply improves, they grow back to normal size and then resume reproduction. These features enable ctenophores to increase their populations very quickly. Members of the Lobata and Cydippida have a reproduction form called dissogeny; two sexually mature stages, first as larva and later as juveniles and adults. During their time as larvae they release gametes periodically. After their first reproductive period is over they do not produce more gametes until later. A population of Mertensia ovum in the central Baltic Sea have become paedogenetic, and consist solely of sexually mature larvae less than 1.6 mm.

In Mnemiopsis leidyi, nitric oxide (NO) signaling is present both in adult tissues and differentially expressed in later embryonic stages suggesting the involvement of NO in developmental mechanisms. The mature form of the same species is also able to revert to the cydippid stage when triggered by environmental stressors.

=== Colors and bioluminescence ===
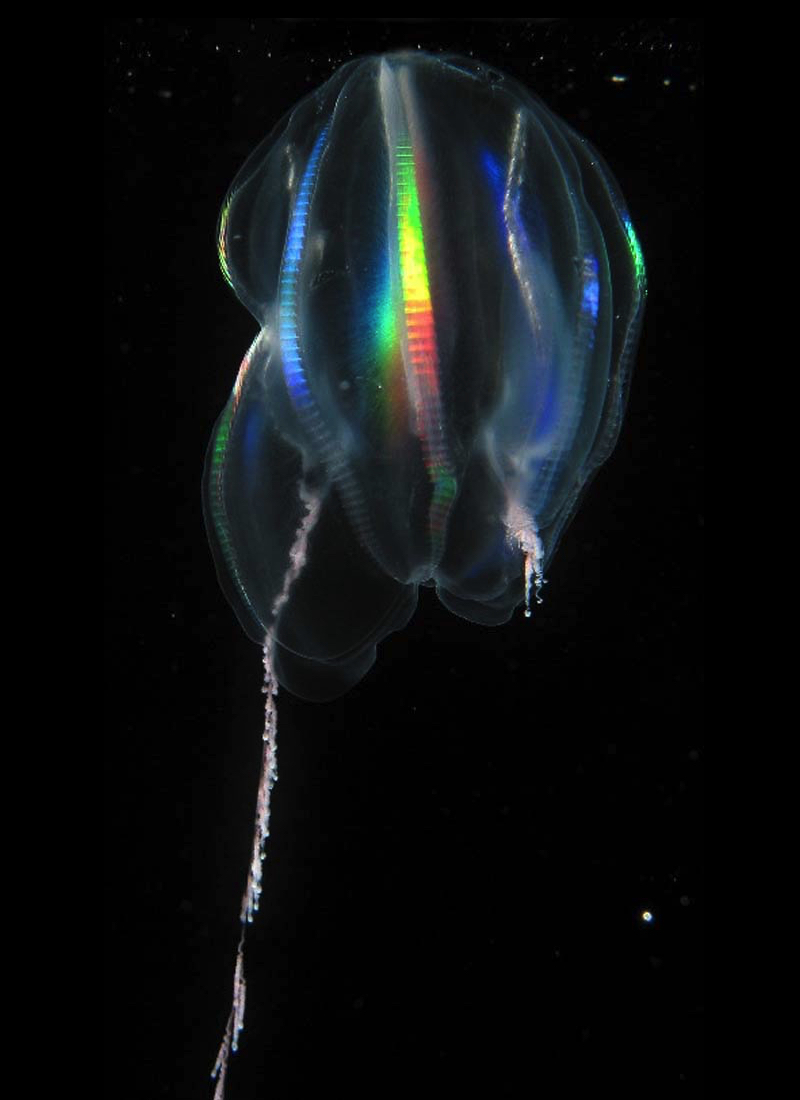
Light diffracting along the comb rows of a Mertensia ovum, left tentacle deployed, right tentacle retracted

Most ctenophores that live near the surface are mostly colorless and almost transparent. However some deeper-living species are strongly pigmented, for example the species known as "Tortugas red" (see illustration here), which has not yet been formally described. Platyctenids generally live attached to other sea-bottom organisms, and often have similar colors to these host organisms. The gut of the deep-sea genus Bathocyroe is red, which hides the bioluminescence of copepods it has swallowed.

The comb rows of most planktonic ctenophores produce a rainbow effect, which is not caused by bioluminescence but by the scattering of light as the combs move. The iridescence shifts through the visible spectrum as the cilia beat, and has a structural, rather than pigmentary, origin. Research by Welch, Vigneron and Parker established that the cilia of the comb plates in Beroe cucumis form a two-dimensional photonic crystal, in which their regular periodic packing at the nanoscale causes constructive interference of light across a broad range of wavelengths. The high refractive index of the surrounding seawater broadens this effect relative to what would be observed in air, enriching the iridescent display.

When some species, including Bathyctena chuni, Euplokamis stationis and Eurhamphaea vexilligera, are disturbed, they produce secretions (ink) that luminesce at much the same wavelengths as their bodies. Juveniles will luminesce more brightly in relation to their body size than adults, whose luminescence is diffused over their bodies. Detailed statistical investigation has not suggested the function of ctenophores' bioluminescence nor produced any correlation between its exact color and any aspect of the animals' environments, such as depth or whether they live in coastal or mid-ocean waters.

In ctenophores, bioluminescence is caused by the activation of calcium-activated proteins named photoproteins in cells called photocytes, which are often confined to the meridional canals that underlie the eight comb rows. In the genome of Mnemiopsis leidyi ten genes encode photoproteins. These genes are co-expressed with opsin genes in the developing photocytes of Mnemiopsis leidyi, raising the possibility that light production and light detection may be working together in these animals.

== Ecology ==
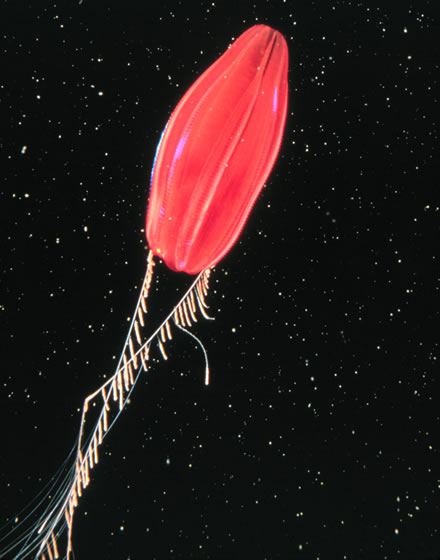
"Tortugas red", with trailing tentacles and clearly visible sidebranches, or tentilla

=== Distribution ===
Ctenophores are found in most marine environments: from polar waters at −2 °C to the tropics at 30 °C; near coasts and in mid-ocean; from the surface waters to the ocean depths at more than 7000 meters. The best-understood are the genera Pleurobrachia, Beroe and Mnemiopsis, as these planktonic coastal forms are among the most likely to be collected near shore.

In 2013 Mnemiopsis was recorded in lake Birket Qarun, and in 2014 in lake El Rayan II, both near Faiyum in Egypt, where they were accidentally introduced by the transport of fish (mullet) fry. Though many species prefer brackish waters like estuaries and coastal lagoons in open connection with the sea, this was the first record from an inland environment. Both lakes are saline, with Birket Qarun being hypersaline, and shows that some ctenophores can establish themselves in saline limnic environments without connection to the ocean. In the long run, it is not expected the populations will survive. The two limiting factors in saline lakes are availability of food and a varied diet, and high temperatures during hot summers. Because a parasitic isopod, Livoneca redmanii, was introduced at the same time, it is difficult to say how much of the ecological impact of invasive species is caused by the ctenophore alone.

=== Prey and predators ===
Almost all ctenophores are predators – there are no herbivores and only one genus that is partly parasitic. If food is plentiful, they can eat ten times their own weight per day. While Beroe preys mainly on other ctenophores, other surface-water species prey on zooplankton (planktonic animals) ranging in size from the microscopic, including mollusc and fish larvae, to small adult crustaceans such as copepods, amphipods, and even krill. Members of the genus Haeckelia prey on jellyfish and incorporate their prey's nematocysts (stinging cells) into their own tentacles instead of colloblasts. Ctenophores have been compared to spiders in their wide range of techniques for capturing prey – some hang motionless in the water using their tentacles as "webs", some are ambush predators like salticid jumping spiders, and some dangle a sticky droplet at the end of a fine thread, as bolas spiders do. This variety explains the wide range of body forms in a phylum with rather few species.

The two-tentacled "cydippid" Lampea feeds exclusively on salps, close relatives of sea-squirts that form large chain-like floating colonies, and juveniles of Lampea attach themselves like parasites to salps that are too large for them to swallow. Members of the cydippid genus Pleurobrachia and the lobate Bolinopsis often reach high population densities at the same place and time because they specialize in different types of prey: Pleurobrachia's long tentacles mainly capture relatively strong swimmers such as adult copepods, while Bolinopsis generally feeds on smaller, weaker swimmers such as rotifers and mollusc and crustacean larvae.

It is often difficult to identify the remains of ctenophores in the guts of possible predators as they are broken down quickly, although the combs sometimes remain intact long enough to provide a clue. Chum salmon, Oncorhynchus keta, digest ctenophores 20 times as fast as an equal weight of shrimps; ctenophores can provide the fish with a good diet if there are enough of them around. Some jellyfish and turtles eat large quantities of ctenophores, and jellyfish may temporarily wipe out ctenophore populations. Since ctenophores and jellyfish often have large seasonal variations in population, most fish that prey on them are generalists and may have a greater effect on populations than specialist jelly-eaters. Herbivorous fishes deliberately feed on gelatinous zooplankton during blooms in the Red Sea. The larvae of some sea anemones are parasites on ctenophores, as are the larvae of some flatworms that parasitize fish when they reach adulthood.

=== Ecological impacts ===
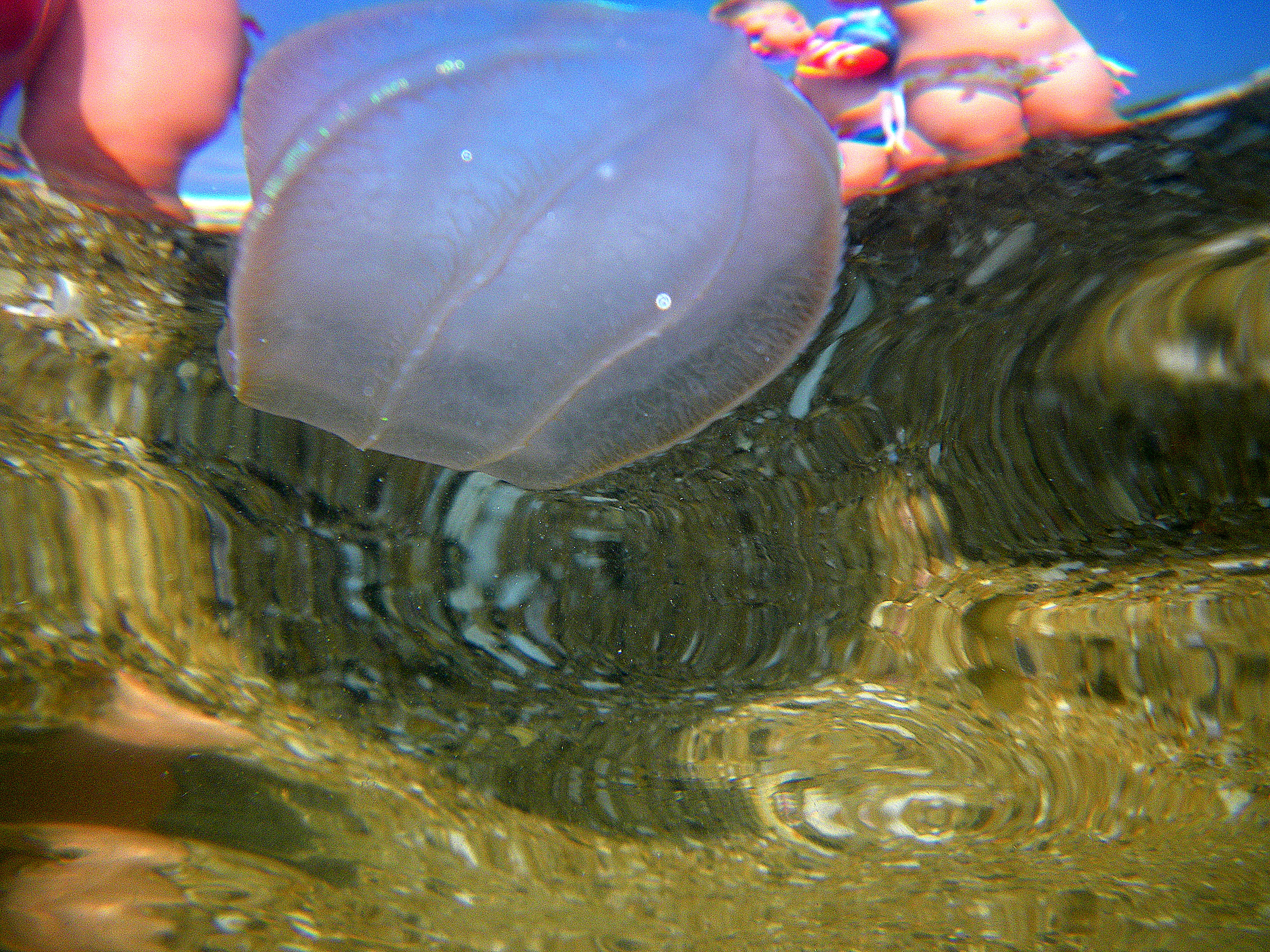
Beroe ovata at the surface on the Black Sea coast

Ctenophores may balance marine ecosystems by preventing an over-abundance of copepods from eating all the phytoplankton (planktonic plants), which are the dominant marine producers of organic matter from non-organic ingredients.

On the other hand, in the late 1980s the Western Atlantic ctenophore Mnemiopsis leidyi was accidentally introduced into the Black Sea and Sea of Azov via the ballast tanks of ships, and has been blamed for causing sharp drops in fish catches by eating both fish larvae and small crustaceans that would otherwise feed the adult fish. Mnemiopsis is well equipped to invade new territories (although this was not predicted until after it so successfully colonized the Black Sea), as it can breed very rapidly and tolerate a wide range of water temperatures and salinities. The impact was increased by chronic overfishing, and by eutrophication that gave the entire ecosystem a short-term boost, causing the Mnemiopsis population to increase even faster than normal – and above all by the absence of efficient predators on these introduced ctenophores. Mnemiopsis populations in those areas were eventually brought under control by the accidental introduction of the Mnemiopsis-eating North American ctenophore Beroe ovata, and by a cooling of the local climate from 1991 to 1993, which significantly slowed the animal's metabolism. However the abundance of plankton in the area seems unlikely to be restored to pre-Mnemiopsis levels.

In the late 1990s Mnemiopsis appeared in the Caspian Sea. Beroe ovata arrived shortly after, and is expected to reduce but not eliminate the impact of Mnemiopsis there. Mnemiopsis also reached the eastern Mediterranean in the late 1990s and now appears to be thriving in the North Sea and Baltic Sea.

== Taxonomy ==
The number of known living ctenophore species is uncertain since many of those named and formally described have turned out to be identical to species known under other scientific names. Claudia Mills estimates that there about 100–150 valid species that are not duplicates, and that at least another 25, mostly deep-sea forms, have been recognized as distinct but not yet analyzed in enough detail to support a formal description and naming.

=== Early classification ===
Early writers combined ctenophores with cnidarians into a single phylum called Coelenterata on account of morphological similarities between the two groups. Like cnidarians, the bodies of ctenophores consist of a mass of jelly, with one layer of cells on the outside and another lining the internal cavity. In ctenophores, however, these layers are two cells deep, while those in cnidarians are only a single cell deep. Ctenophores also resemble cnidarians in relying on water flow through the body cavity for both digestion and respiration, as well as in having a decentralized nerve net rather than a brain. Genomic studies have suggested that the neurons of Ctenophora, which differ in many ways from other animal neurons, evolved independently from those of the other animals.

=== Modern taxonomy ===
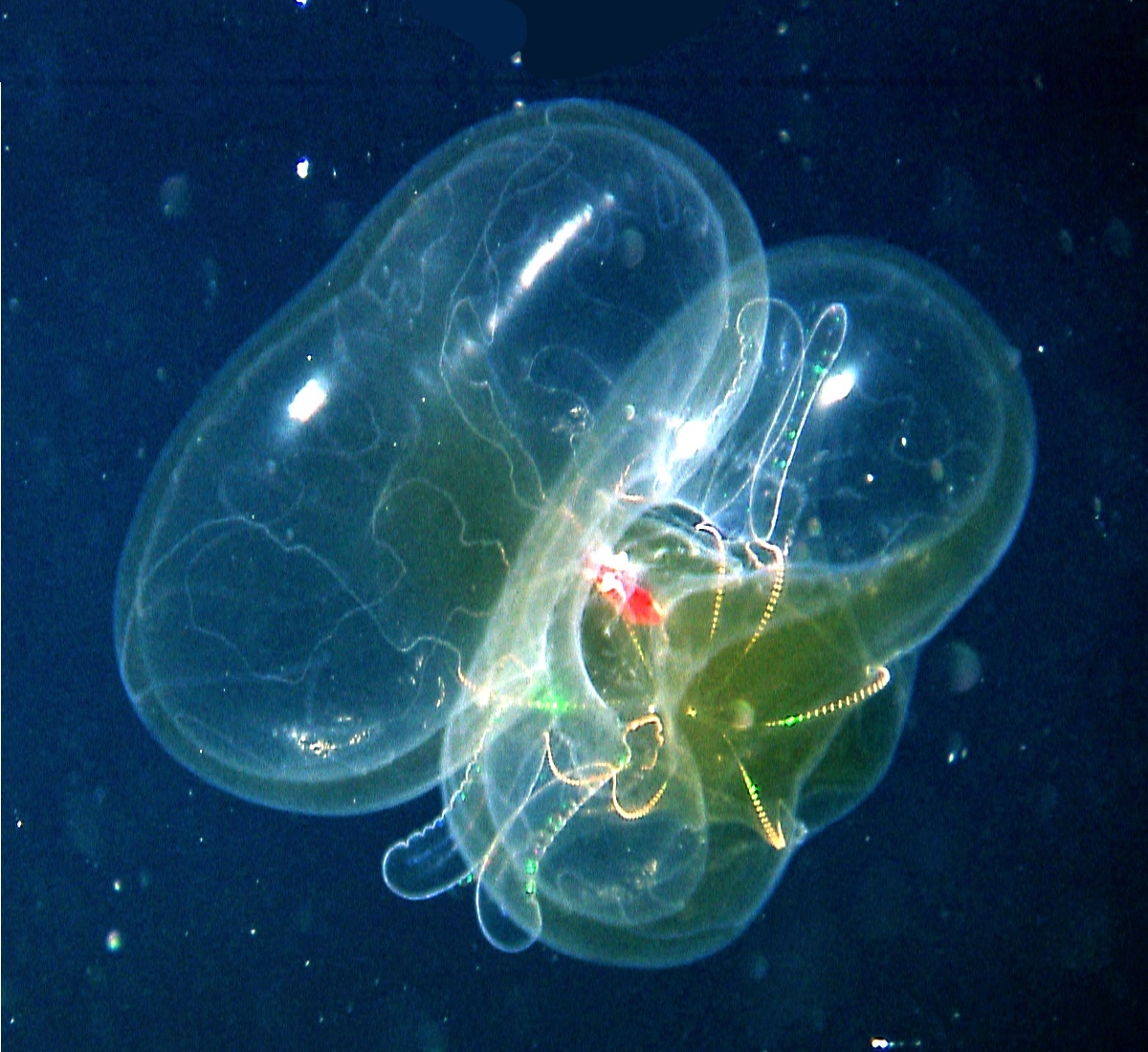
Lobata sp., with paired thick lobes

The traditional classification divides ctenophores into two classes, those with tentacles (Tentaculata) and those without (Nuda). The Nuda contains only one order (Beroida) and family (Beroidae), and two genera, Beroe (several species) and Neis (one species).

The Tentaculata are divided into the following eight orders:

- Cydippida, egg-shaped animals with long tentacles
- Lobata, with paired thick lobes
- Platyctenida, flattened animals that live on or near the sea-bed; most lack combs as adults, and use their pharynges as suckers to attach themselves to surfaces
- Ganeshida, with a pair of small lobes round the mouth, but an extended pharynx like that of platyctenids
- Cambojiida
- Cryptolobiferida
- Thalassocalycida, with short tentacles and a jellyfish-like "umbrella"
- Cestida, ribbon-shaped and the largest ctenophores

== Evolutionary history ==
Despite their fragile, gelatinous bodies, fossils thought to represent ctenophores – apparently with no tentacles but many more comb-rows than modern forms – have been found in Lagerstätten as far back as the early Cambrian, about 515 million years ago. Nevertheless, a recent molecular phylogenetics analysis concludes that the common ancestor originated approximately 350 million years ago ± 88 million years ago, conflicting with previous estimates which suggests it occurred 66 million years ago, shortly after the Cretaceous–Paleogene extinction event.

The following cladogram shows hypothesized relationships among some of the more well-understood members of the Ctenophora stem group, with the Dinomischidae seen as a paraphyletic grade:

- Ctenophora (total group)
  - "Dinomischids"
  - - Daihuoides
    - - Scleroctenophora
      - Ctenophora (crown group)

=== Fossil record ===
Because of their soft, gelatinous bodies, ctenophores are extremely rare as fossils, and fossils that have been interpreted as ctenophores have been found only in Lagerstätten, places where the environment was exceptionally suited to the preservation of soft tissue. Until the mid-1990s, only two specimens good enough for analysis were known, both members of the crown group, from the early Devonian (Emsian) period. Three additional putative species were then found in the Burgess Shale and other Canadian rocks of similar age, about 505 million years ago in the mid-Cambrian period. All three lacked tentacles but had between 24 and 80 comb rows, far more than the eight typical of living species. They also appear to have had internal organ-like structures unlike anything found in living ctenophores. One of the fossil species first reported in 1996 had a large mouth, apparently surrounded by a folded edge that may have been muscular. Evidence from China a year later suggests that such ctenophores were widespread in the Cambrian, but perhaps very different from modern species – for example one fossil's comb-rows were mounted on prominent vanes. The youngest fossil of a species outside the crown group is Daihuoides from the late Devonian, which belongs to a basal group that had been assumed to have gone extinct more than 140 million years earlier.

The Ediacaran Eoandromeda could putatively represent a comb jelly. It has eightfold symmetry, with eight spiral arms resembling the comblike rows of a ctenophore. If it is indeed ctenophore, it places the group close to the origin of the Bilateria. The early Cambrian sessile frond-like fossil Stromatoveris, from China's Chengjiang lagerstätte and dated to about 515 million years ago, is very similar to Vendobionta of the preceding Ediacaran period. De-Gan Shu, Simon Conway Morris, et al. found on its branches what they considered rows of cilia, used for filter feeding. They suggested that Stromatoveris was an evolutionary "aunt" of ctenophores, and that ctenophores originated from sessile animals whose descendants became swimmers and changed the cilia from a feeding mechanism to a propulsion system. Other Cambrian fossils that support the idea of ctenophores having evolved from sessile forms are Dinomischus, Daihua, Xianguangia and Siphusauctum which also lived on the seafloor, had organic skeletons and cilia-covered tentacles surrounding their mouth, which have been found by cladistic analysis as members of the ctenophore stem-group In 2026, the dinomischid-like Edrathina was described from the Ediacaran of Canada, dating to around 550 million years ago, providing the currently oldest known record of the ctenophore lineage.

520 million-year-old Cambrian fossils also from Chengjiang in China show a now wholly extinct class of ctenophore, named "Scleroctenophora", that had a complex internal skeleton with long spines. The skeleton also supported eight soft-bodied flaps, which could have been used for swimming and possibly feeding. One form, Thaumactena, had a streamlined body resembling that of arrow worms and could have been an agile swimmer.

=== Relationship to other animal groups ===
The phylogenetic relationship of ctenophores to the rest of Metazoa is very important to our understanding of the early evolution of animals and the origin of multicellularity. It has been the focus of debate for many years. Ctenophores have been purported to be the sister lineage to the Bilateria, sister to the Cnidaria, Placozoa, and Bilateria, and sister to all other animals.

Walter Garstang in his book Larval Forms and Other Zoological Verses (Mülleria and the Ctenophore) even expressed a theory that ctenophores were descended from a neotenic Mülleria larva of a polyclad.

A series of studies that looked at the presence and absence of members of gene families and signalling pathways (e.g., homeoboxes, nuclear receptors, the Wnt signaling pathway, and sodium channels) suggest that ctenophores are either sister to Cnidaria, Placozoa, and Bilateria or sister to all other animal phyla. Several more recent studies comparing complete sequenced genomes of ctenophores with other sequenced animal genomes support ctenophores as sister to all other animals. This position would suggest that neural and muscle cell types either were lost in major animal lineages (e.g., Porifera and Placozoa) or evolved independently in the ctenophore lineage.

Other researchers have argued that the placement of Ctenophora as sister to all other animals is a statistical anomaly caused by the high rate of evolution in ctenophore genomes, and that Porifera is the earliest-diverging animal taxon instead (a "sponge sister" topology). They also have extremely high rates of mitochondrial evolution, and the smallest known RNA/protein content of the mtDNA genome in animals. As such, the Ctenophora appear to be a basal diploblast clade. In agreement with the latter point, the analysis of a very large sequence alignment at the metazoan taxonomic scale (1,719 proteins totalizing c. 400 000 amino acid positions) in Simion et al. (2017) showed that ctenophores emerge as the second-earliest branching animal lineage, and sponges are sister to all other multicellular animals. Research on mucin genes shows that sponges have never had them while all other animals, including comb jellies, do. G-type lysozymes are also absent in ctenophores, while being present in all the other main groups.

Despite all their differences, ctenophoran neurons share the same foundation as cnidarian neurons after findings shows that peptide-expressing neurons are probably ancestral to chemical neurotransmitters.

The issue with the "rate of evolution" counterargument is that it mainly affects analyses based on the sequence of genes, not those based on gene family presence or synteny, both of which have produced results in support of the "Ctenophora sister" theory. Even with sequence-based analyses, the biases can also be corrected for: Whelan et al. (2017), using such an approach, strongly rejects the hypothesis that sponges are the sister group to all other extant animals and establishes the placement of Ctenophora as the sister group to all other animals, and disagreement with Simion et al. (2017) is explained by methodological problems in analyses in that work. Synteny analysis by Schultz et al. (2023) supports the same result. Neither ctenophores nor sponges possess HIF pathways, their genome express only a single type of voltage-gated calcium channel unlike other animals which have three types, and they are the only known animal phyla that lack any true Hox genes. A few species from other phyla; the nemertean pilidium larva, the larva of the phoronid species Phoronopsis harmeri and the acorn worm larva Schizocardium californicum, do not depend on Hox genes in their larval development either, but need them during metamorphosis to reach their adult form. Innexin genes, which code for proteins used for intercellular communication in animals, also appears to have evolved independently in ctenophores.

=== Internal phylogeny ===
- - Mertensiidae (cydippids)
  - - Platyctenida
    - - Pleurobrachiidae (cydippids)
      - - Lobata
        - Thalassocalycida
        - Cestida
      - - Haeckeliidae (cydippids)
        - Beroida

Relationships within Ctenophora (2001).

- - Euplokamis
  - - Platyctenida
    - - Pleurobrachiidae
      - - Mertensiidae
        - - - Dryodoridae
            - Beroida
          - Lobata incl. Cestida

Relationships within Ctenophora (2017).

Since all modern ctenophores except the beroids have cydippid-like larvae, it has widely been assumed that their last common ancestor also resembled cydippids, having an egg-shaped body and a pair of retractable tentacles. Richard Harbison's purely morphological analysis in 1985 concluded that the cydippids are not monophyletic, in other words do not contain all and only the descendants of a single common ancestor that was itself a cydippid. Instead, he found that various cydippid families were more similar to members of other ctenophore orders than to other cydippids. He suggested that the last common ancestor of modern ctenophores was either cydippid-like or beroid-like.

A molecular phylogeny analysis in 2001, using 26 species, including four recently discovered ones, confirmed that the cydippids are not monophyletic and concluded that the last common ancestor of modern ctenophores was cydippid-like. It also found that the genetic differences between these species were so small that the relationships between the Lobata, Cestida and Thalassocalycida remained uncertain. This suggests that the last common ancestor of modern ctenophores was relatively recent, and perhaps survived the Cretaceous–Paleogene extinction event 65.5 million years ago while other lineages perished. When the analysis was broadened to include representatives of other phyla, it concluded that cnidarians are probably more closely related to bilaterians than either group is to ctenophores but that this diagnosis is uncertain. A 2017 study corroborates the paraphyly of Cydippida but finds that Lobata is paraphyletic with respect to Cestida.

== See also ==
- Gelatinous zooplankton
