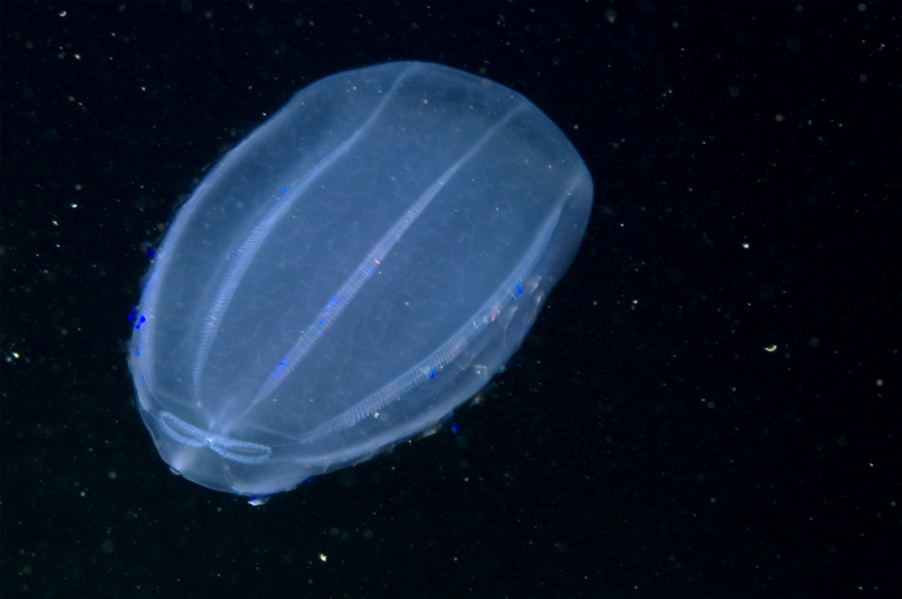

Scientific classification
- Kingdom: Animalia
- Phylum: Ctenophora
- Class: Nuda
- Order: Beroida
- Family: Beroidae
- Genus: Beroe
- Species: B. cucumis

Binomial name
- Beroe cucumis Fabricius, 1780

= Beroe cucumis =

Species of comb jelly

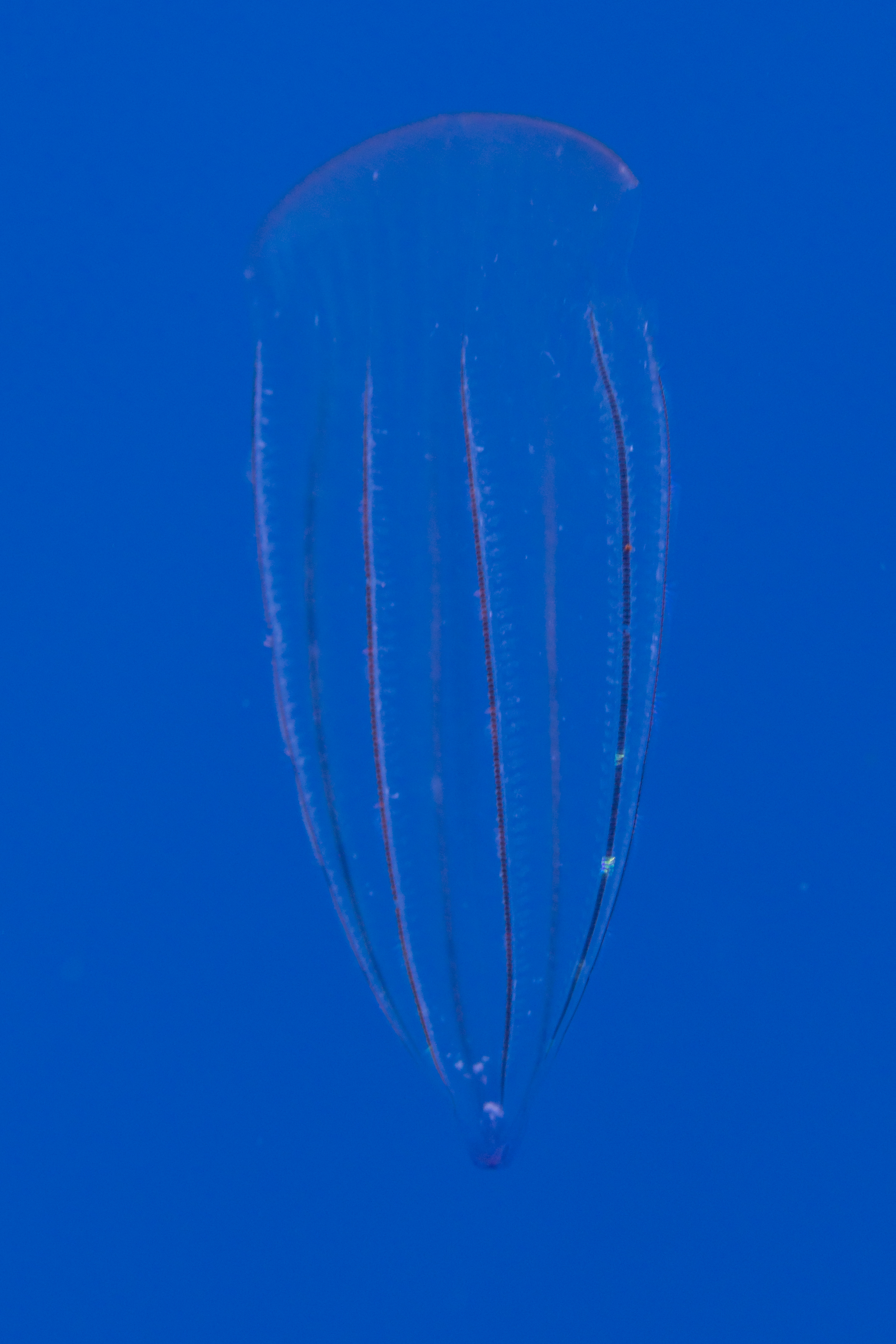
Beroe cucumis in Baja California

Beroe cucumis is a species of comb jelly in the family Beroidae. It is found in the Atlantic Ocean. It was first described by the Danish missionary and naturalist Otto Fabricius in 1780.

== Description ==
Beroe cucumis has a transparent, sac-like body, often somewhat compressed, and reaches a maximum length of about 15 cm (6 in). The wide mouth is at one end. The body has eight longitudinal rows of cilia that extend from the aboral end (opposite end to the mouth), three quarters of the way along the animal. The cilia are arranged on short transverse plates and beat in synchrony to propel the animal through the water, giving a shimmering effect. The general body colour is pink, especially along the rows of cilia, and the plates are bioluminescent. There is a figure of eight shaped ring of small papillae around the aboral tip. Gastrovascular channels extend from the stomach through the body wall beneath the rows of cilia, and these have short side branches, which distinguishes Beroe cucumis from the otherwise similar Beroe gracilis. Juveniles of the two species are indistinguishable.

== Coloration ==
Although the generally pinkish body color of Beroe cucumis is due to pigmentation, the striking iridescence of its comb rows — the eight longitudinal bands of beating cilia — has a structural rather than pigmentary origin. Research by Welch, Vigneron and Parker established that the densely packed cilia in the comb rows form a two-dimensional photonic crystal, in which the regular periodic arrangement of the ciliary fibres at the nanoscale causes constructive interference of light across the visible spectrum. The broad iridescence, which shifts continuously through the spectrum as the combs beat, arises because the photonic band structure of the array reflects different wavelengths at different angles. The high refractive index of the surrounding seawater, compared with air, also contributes to the richness of the iridescent effect.

== Distribution ==
Beroe cucumis is found in the North Atlantic Ocean and the North Sea, including the Skagerrak and the Kattegat. It sometimes occurs in the Mediterranean Sea. It is a pelagic, open water species and its depth range is not known.

== Ecology ==
Beroe cucumis is a predator and mostly feeds on other comb jellies, particularly Bolinopsis infundibulum; these are pulled into the large mouth and swallowed whole.

The comb jelly Mnemiopsis leidyi is an invasive species originally native to the western Atlantic coastal waters that was introduced into the Black Sea in the 1980s, with deleterious results to the ecosystem. Since then it has spread to the Caspian Sea, the North Sea and the Baltic Sea. In the Black Sea, some measure of control was achieved when another predatory comb jelly, Beroe ovata, was introduced.

Mnemiopsis leidyi was first recorded in the Mediterranean Sea in 1990 and in 2009, large swarms were present in some areas. Beroe cucumis is native to the northern Atlantic Ocean and sometimes occurs in the Mediterranean Sea, and it is being monitored to see if it can provide some level of control of M. leidyi. In 2012, Beroe cucumis was found off the coast of Israel for the first time, and there is proof that it preys on M. leidyi, as an individual was found with a partially digested M. leidyi in its stomach.
