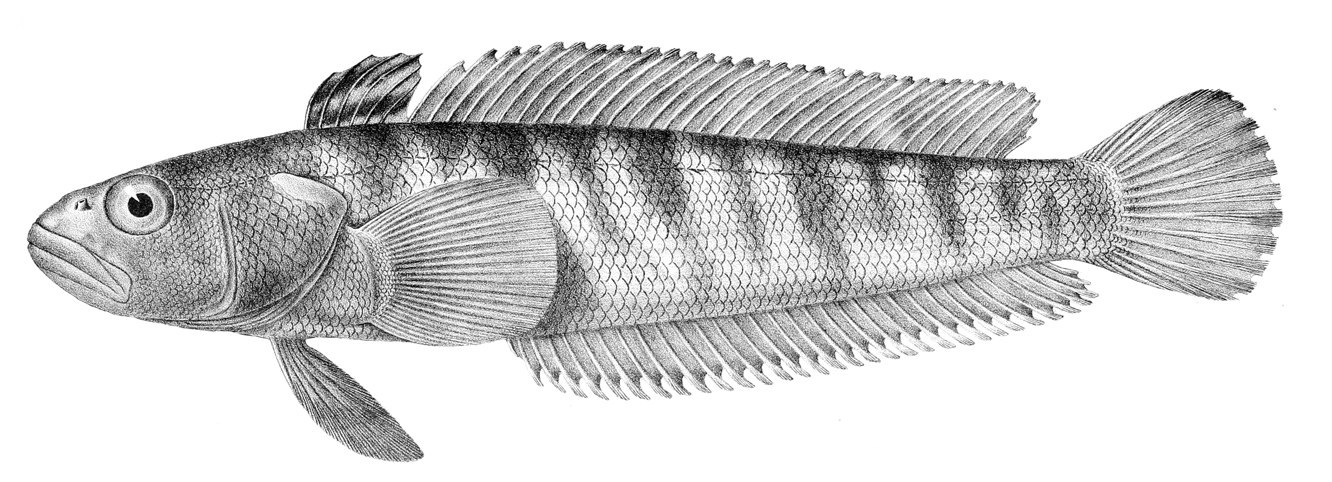
- Illustration

Conservation status
- Data Deficient (IUCN 3.1)

Scientific classification
- Kingdom: Animalia
- Phylum: Chordata
- Class: Actinopterygii
- Order: Perciformes
- Family: Nototheniidae
- Genus: Patagonotothen
- Species: P. ramsayi

Binomial name
- Patagonotothen ramsayi (Regan, 1913)

Synonyms
- Notothenia ramsayi Regan, 1913; Patagonotothen longipes ramsayi (Regan, 1913)

= Patagonotothen ramsayi =

Species of ray-finned fish

Patagonotothen ramsayi, the longtail southern cod, rock cod, marujo (in spanish) or Notothenia, is a benthopelagic species of marine ray-finned fish of the family Nototheniidae, the notothens or the cod icefishes, native to the Patagonian Shelf in the southwest Atlantic, where it is the most abundant notothen species found, dominating among medium-sized demersal fishes in the area, and is a commercially important species.

== Taxonomy ==
This species was originally described as Notothenia ramsayi by Charles Tate Regan, who collected the holotype from the Burdwood Bank in 1903 during the Scottish National Antarctic Expedition, and later misspelled the binomial name as Patagonotothen longipes ramsayi. Both are currently considered synonyms of Patagonotothen ramsayi.

This species was named in memory of Allan George Ramsay, chief engineer of the Scotia, who died at Scotia Bay in the South Orkney Islands on 6 August 1903.

== Description ==
This species attains a maximum total length (TL) of 44 cm (17.3 in), and is characterized by its 7 dorsal spines, 32-35 total dorsal soft rays, an absence of anal spines, 32-34 total anal soft rays, 51 or 52 vertebrae, 11 or 12 upper lateral line scales and 49-54 lower lateral line scales. The caudal fin is rounded. The anal and ventral fins and the throat of older males are deep black.

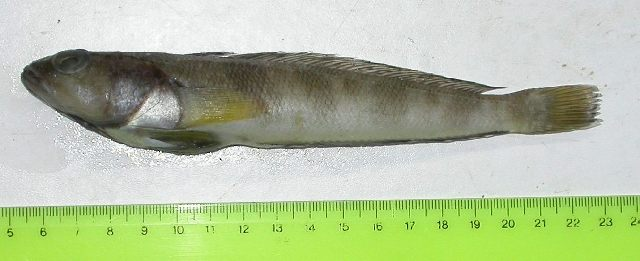
A specimen with a ruler for comparison

== Distribution ==
This species is found on the Patagonian Shelf from 36°S in the north to 56°S in the south, at the southern edge of the Burdwood Bank, from 50 m (164 ft) to a maximum depth of 500 m (1640 ft). To the west the species enters the Strait of Magellan but does not occur on the Chilean side.

The species is unevenly distributed over the covered areas. The densest populations are located north of 40°S and on the Burdwood Bank, with lower population densities between these areas. Population density decreases sharply from depth 400 m (1312 ft) onwards.

Areas north of 42°S are characterized by the predominance of individuals of length 15–20 cm (5.91-7.87 in) over the whole depth range, whereas on the Burdwood Bank and in areas between 46° and 52°S individuals of different lengths are more evenly distributed with a length range of 4 to 37 cm (1.57-14.6 in). Individuals of length less than 10 cm (3.94 in) are only found in shallower waters, reaching a depth of 130 m (427 ft) on the Burdwood Bank. With increasing depth, the proportion of fishes of length 20 cm (7.87 in) or more increases.

The distribution and abundance of this species is highly correlated with water temperature. Population density is highest in areas with temperatures of up to 8.0 °C (46.4 °F). Areas with higher temperatures of up to 10.9 °C (51.6 °F) are thinly populated, and those with temperatures higher than 11 °C (51.8 °F) are unpopulated.

== Ecology ==
In general, this species is a benthic feeder with a moderately diverse diet that mainly feeds on zooplankton, especially those of crustacean (e.g. amphipods) and gelatinous origin. The diet of juveniles of total length 10–16 cm (3.94-6.30 in) includes mostly copepods in summer and the comb jelly Mnemiopsis leydyi in winter. Adults of total length 17–34 cm (6.69-13.39 in) consume mainly plankton in summer, with comb jellies and salps being of primary importance. In winter, they mainly take benthic animals, primarily brittle stars and lobster krill (Munida spp.) and the comb jelly. During the fishing season, discarded bycatch from trawl fisheries, primarily squid, are also scavenged.

Sexual maturity is attained at total length 27.6 cm (10.7 in) and 24.3 cm (9.57 in) for males and females respectively. The age of sexual maturity is 4–7 years for males and 4–8 years for females.

Around the Falkland Islands, total fecundity ranges between 24,300 and 76,700 eggs. Spawning occurs from June to August at night on shelf breaks and peaks in June. Egg weight per egg ranges from 0.003 grams to around 0.005 grams. Analysis of length frequency distributions over the year and sex ratios of mature fish during the spawning season indicates possible nesting and nest guarding behaviour in male fish, similar to other notothens.

After the collapse of southern blue whiting stocks in the Southwest Atlantic in 2004-2007, this species overtook its ecological role, and exhibited a 20-30 fold increase in catches. It is an important food source for all predatory fish and a keystone species in the southwest Atlantic ecosystem along with the squid Doryteuthis gahi; representing about half of the food consumption in hakes, toothfish, kingclip, and some skates. Its importance increases with increasing size of the predator, with it gradually substituting a similar-sized squid. The explosion of this species' abundance coincided with an increase of seasonal immigrants preying on this species (hakes and kingclip) that may have changed their migratory timing and patterns to prey on this species more efficiently.

This species is relatively slow-growing and has greater longevity compared to other notothens, reaching a maximum age of 14 years. It attains about 5–6 centimetres (2.0–2.4 in) in its first year, after which it grows about 3 centimetres (1.2 in) per year until age 4. After this, growth rapidly slows to 2 centimetres (0.79 in) per year until age 7 and then down to approximately 1 centimetre (0.39 in) per year.

Individuals from the Burdwood Bank have lower growth rates and greater longevity than those from other areas, which is due to the lower temperatures on the Bank.

== Relationship with humans ==
The white-coloured flesh is described as having 'a seaweedy, shellfishy odour, sweet and meaty taste, quite similar to cod, and a firm and elastic texture'. In addition, it is considered to be a healthy and nutritious species for human consumption owing to the high protein and moderate fat contents, similar to other commercially exploited species such as hake, halibut, sea bass and cod, and its high concentration of Omega-3 fatty acids and vitamin E. The flesh, with an average yield of about 40%, also contains significant amounts of magnesium, calcium and potassium.

Large-scale commercial fisheries first started in 1985 with Soviet Union fishing fleets landing 5,969 tonnes (6,580 tons) that year. More recently, in 2011, total landings stood at 30,613 tonnes (33,745 tons).
