= Neis (disambiguation) =

Neis can refer to:

- Neis, a genus of nudan ctenophores
- Neis, daughter of Zethus or Amphion. The Neitian gate at Thebes, Greece was believed to have derived its name from her.
- Barbara Neis (born 1952), Canadian social scientist
- Bernie Neis (1895–1972), American baseball player
- Fabrício Neis (born 1990), Brazilian tennis player
- Reagan Dale Neis (born 1976), Canadian actress

== See also ==
- Nei (disambiguation)
