= Beroe penicillata =

Scientific classification
- Domain: Eukaryota
- Kingdom: Animalia
- Phylum: Ctenophora
- Class: Nuda
- Order: Beroida
- Family: Beroidae
- Genus: Beroe
- Species: B. penicillata

Binomial name
- Beroe penicillata (Mertens, 1833)

Marine species of ctenophore

Beroe penicillata is a marine species of ctenophore.
