= Beroe australis =

Scientific classification
- Kingdom: Animalia
- Phylum: Ctenophora
- Class: Nuda
- Order: Beroida
- Family: Beroidae
- Genus: Beroe
- Species: B. australis

Binomial name
- Beroe australis A. Agassiz & Mayer, 1899

Species of comb jelly

Beroe australis is a species of beroid ctenophore, or comb jelly, found in the Pacific Ocean.

== Taxonomy ==
B. australis was originally described by Alexander Agassiz and Alfred G. Mayer from a specimen caught off Fiji in December 1897. Subsequent studies have noted its similarity to Beroe forskalii, with some considering the two species synonymous. Despite this similarity, it is currently recognized as a distinct species.

== Description ==
B. australis is approximately 40 mm (1.6 in) long. Its body is compressed laterally, with one side being about three times as broad as the other. The photocytes, which run the length of the comb rows and surround the statocyst, are crimson lake in color.

== Range and Habitat ==
Aside from its type location, B. australis has been collected off New Caledonia.
