= Beroe campana =

Scientific classification
- Kingdom: Animalia
- Phylum: Ctenophora
- Class: Nuda
- Order: Beroida
- Family: Beroidae
- Genus: Beroe
- Species: B. campana

Binomial name
- Beroe campana Masao Kamai, 1918

Species of comb jelly

Beroe campana is a species of ctenophore in the genus Beroe.

== Physical appearance ==
Its body is shaped like that of a flattened melon. It can be distinguished from species of the same genus by the shape of its body, the length of the comb plate row, and whether the meridian branches are connected to each other.

== Habitat ==
It is found at Sukumo Bay in Shikoku, Japan, from winter to spring.
