= Beroe basteri =

Scientific classification
- Domain: Eukaryota
- Kingdom: Animalia
- Phylum: Ctenophora
- Class: Nuda
- Order: Beroida
- Family: Beroidae
- Genus: Beroe
- Species: B. basteri

Binomial name
- Beroe basteri Lesson, 1829

Species of comb jelly

Beroe basteri is a species of beroid ctenophore, or comb jelly, native to the Pacific Ocean.

== Taxonomy ==
Beroe basteri was originally described by René Primevère Lesson in 1829 from a specimen collected near Callao, Peru. Lesson gave it the common name "Béroé de Baster," but did not indicate why he chose it.

== Description ==
Beroe basteri is ovoid; Lesson likened its shape to that of a small melon ("De forme d'un petit melon"). It has nine combs of white cilia running along its body which lack the iridescence common in other members of this genus.

== Distribution and habitat ==
Although little studied, B. basteri has historically been found in the Pacific Ocean off the coasts of Peru and Chile.
