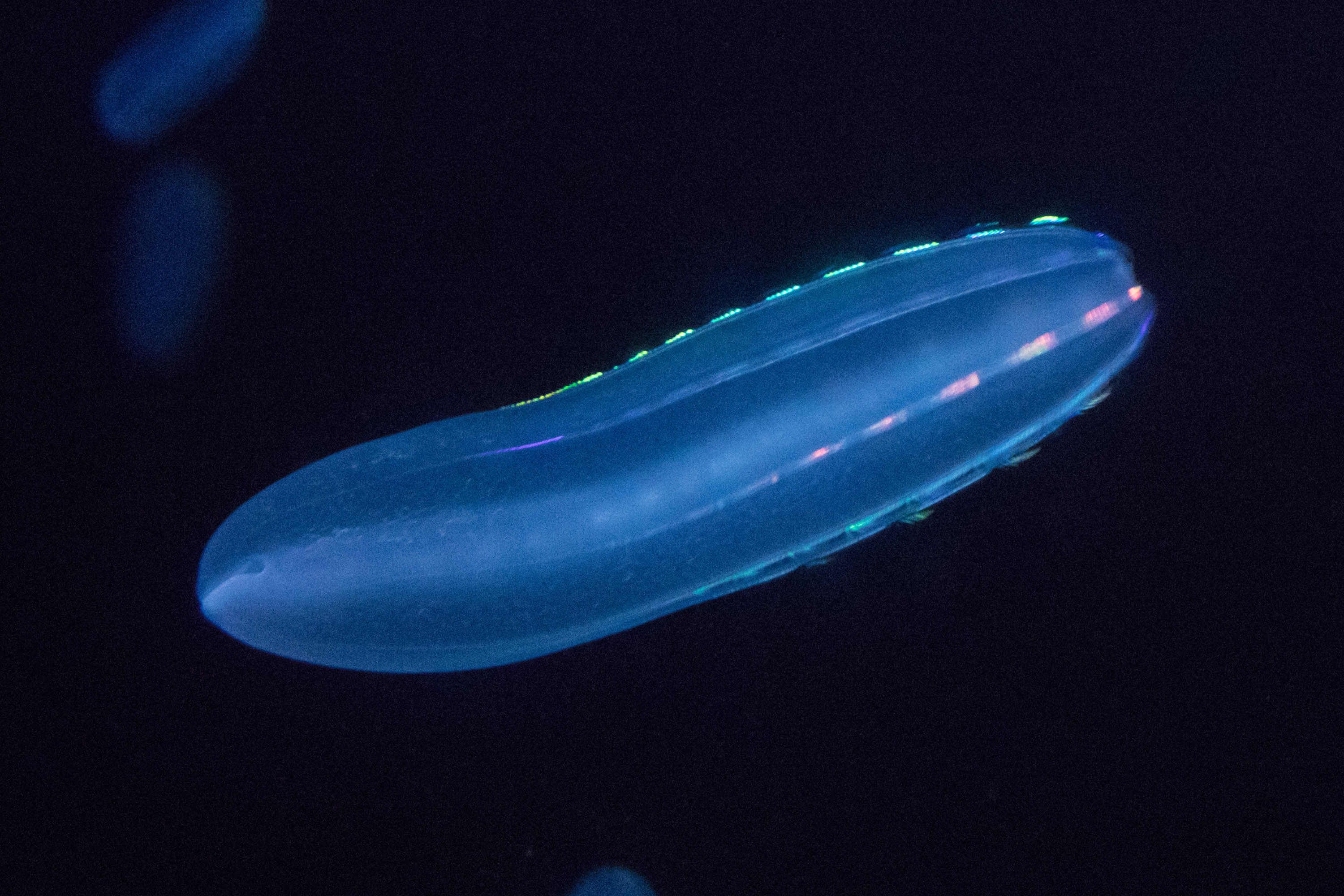

Scientific classification
- Domain: Eukaryota
- Kingdom: Animalia
- Phylum: Ctenophora
- Class: Nuda
- Order: Beroida
- Family: Beroidae
- Genus: Beroe
- Species: B. abyssicola

Binomial name
- Beroe abyssicola Mortensen, 1927

= Beroe abyssicola =

Species of comb jelly

Beroe abyssicola is a species of beroid ctenophore, or comb jelly. It is largely found in deep waters in the North Pacific Ocean, and is common in Japan and the Arctic Ocean. A predator, B. abyssicola feeds mostly on other ctenophores by swallowing them whole. Like other ctenophores, B. abyssicola has a simple nervous system in the form of a nerve net, which it uses to direct its movement, feeding, and hunting behaviors.

== Description ==
Beroe abyssicola is a pelagic ctenophore species that inhabits the North Pacific. Like other Beroida, B. abyssicola has a very different body plan from other Ctenophores, namely the lack of any tentacles in any life stage. B. abyssicola has a muscular, flat, and cylindrical body. It can grow up to 7 cm long, shorter than other beroids, but larger than most ctenophores. Its body is more opaque than other ctenophores and can have coloration red or purple. When not feeding, the large mouth is kept closed using adhesive bands of epithelial cells that stick together, holding the mouth closed.

== Anatomy and behavior ==
Abyssal comb jelly (Beroe abyssicola) swimming

Beroe abyssicola is a ctenophore with a flexible, highly muscular body. Being a predator, B. abyssicola uses its muscular body along with its ctene rows to swim and capture its prey, and uses its wide mouth to swallow its prey whole. When not feeding, the mouth is held closed using bands of adhesive epithelial cells paired for each mouth. The mesoglea of Beroe have large smooth muscle fibers, which allows the ctenophore the flexibility to swallow much of its prey whole.

=== Nervous system ===
The nervous system of B. abyssicola does not have a central nervous system, but rather consists of a nerve net. The largest concentration of nervous function is concentrated in the aboral organ, located opposite the mouth. Beroe has a defense response that retracts the entire aboral organ inside the body of itself for protection. This organ mediates swimming, gravity sensing and possibly more functions. The nerve net extends out from this organ, covering the surface and pharyngeal surface, as well as a separate system of neurons in the mesoglea.

There is a band of sensory cells surrounding the mouth of abyssicola that can detect chemical and mechanical stimuli. These "lips" can be used by Beroe to detect prey and assist with feeding.

The nervous system of Beroe abyssicola, along with other Ctenophora, is different to those of other animals. Almost no neurotransmitters but glutamate are shared between ctenophore nervous systems and others, as well as lacking many of the same pathways involved in other nervous systems. It has been hypothesized that the nervous systems of Beroe abyssicola, along with other Ctenophores, evolved independently of those of other animals.

=== Feeding ===
Beroe abyssicola, like other members of the class Nuda, are predatory ctenophores, whose diet consists mainly of smaller ctenophores. The primary prey of B. abyssicola is Bolinopsis infundibulum. Beroe has a set of large cilia on the inside of its mouth called macrocilia. These macrocilia are large enough to function as teeth, used to keep prey inside and even tear the tissue of the gelatinous prey. Using its "lips" to detect prey, Beroe opens its mouth and swallows its prey whole. B. abyssicola possesses a large pharynx that spans nearly the length of the body to digest its food, using pharyngeal muscles and macrocilia to keep its mouth closed and prey inside. Once digested, the food then moves through the gastrovascular system in canals, which supplies nutrients throughout the mesoglea.

=== Locomotion ===
Beroe's swimming is powered by 8 comb rows of joined cilia, swimming mouth-first. They swim constantly and strongly to search for prey, and swallow their prey blindly when they do. Their swimming is controlled largely by the aboral organ.

== Distribution ==
Beroe abyssicola can be found throughout the Northern Pacific Ocean. Abyssicola can be found up to 2000 meters below the ocean surface, and is common in the waters around Japan, as well as the Arctic Ocean, mostly found below 400 meters.

== Bioluminescence ==
Like other ctenophores, B. abyssicola has a rainbow effect on its comb rows caused by light refraction, but it also possesses bioluminescence. Bioluminescence in Beroe is caused by calcium activated photoproteins, similar to hydromedusae. This photoprotein is called berovin, and differs from photoproteins used by hydromedusa in that it is sensitive to visible and UV light, and largely has a different genetic sequence. However both types of photoprotein have a similar EF-Hand structure despite the sequence differences between the two proteins.

== Taxonomy ==
Beroe abyssicola is a ctenophore in the genus Beroe, in the class Nuda. It is classified here because of its lack of tentacles placing it into the Nuda class, and its cylindrical body shape classifying it as Beroe. Ctenophore phylogeny is complicated and not agreed upon entirely. Recent evidence suggests that the Beroida order may be polyphyletic, with Beroe abyssicola being outside of the clade including all other Beroe species. This also suggests B. abyssicola evolved a loss of tentacles independently of other beroid species.
