= Beroe baffini =

Scientific classification
- Kingdom: Animalia
- Phylum: Ctenophora
- Class: Nuda
- Order: Beroida
- Family: Beroidae
- Genus: Beroe
- Species: B. baffini

Binomial name
- Beroe baffini Kramp, 1942

Species of comb jelly

Beroe baffini is a species of beroid ctenophore, or comb jelly. It was originally described by Paul Lassenius Kramp in 1942.
