= Paraliparis bathypelagicus =

Scientific classification
- Kingdom: Animalia
- Phylum: Chordata
- Class: Actinopterygii
- Division: Teleostei
- Order: Perciformes
- Suborder: Cottoidei
- Family: Liparidae
- Genus: Paraliparis
- Species: P. bathypelagicus

Binomial name
- Paraliparis bathypelagicus Chernova & Desmet, 2026

Species of deep-sea snailfish

Paraliparis bathypelagicus is a species of deep-sea snailfish in the family Liparidae. It was described in 2026 from Burdwood Bank in the southwestern Atlantic Ocean and is known from a single specimen collected at a depth of 1,470 m.

== Description ==
Paraliparis bathypelagicus has a slender, laterally compressed body that tapers strongly towards the tail. It has 68 vertebrae, 61 dorsal-fin rays, 57 anal-fin rays, 16 pectoral-fin rays and 6 caudal-fin rays. The dorsal surface of the head and body is pale, while the underside of the head and belly is black and the tail is darkly pigmented. The skin is thin, naked and transparent.

== Distribution ==
The species is known only from Burdwood Bank, southeast of the Falkland Islands. The holotype was collected at a depth of 1,470 m on 3 April 2025.

== Etymology ==
The specific epithet bathypelagicus is derived from the Greek bathýs, meaning "deep", and pelagios, meaning "of the sea", referring to the deep-water habitat in which the holotype was collected.
