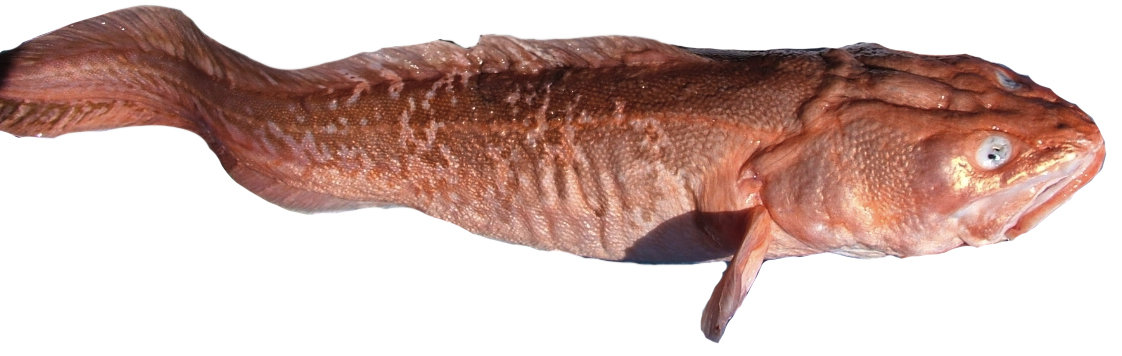

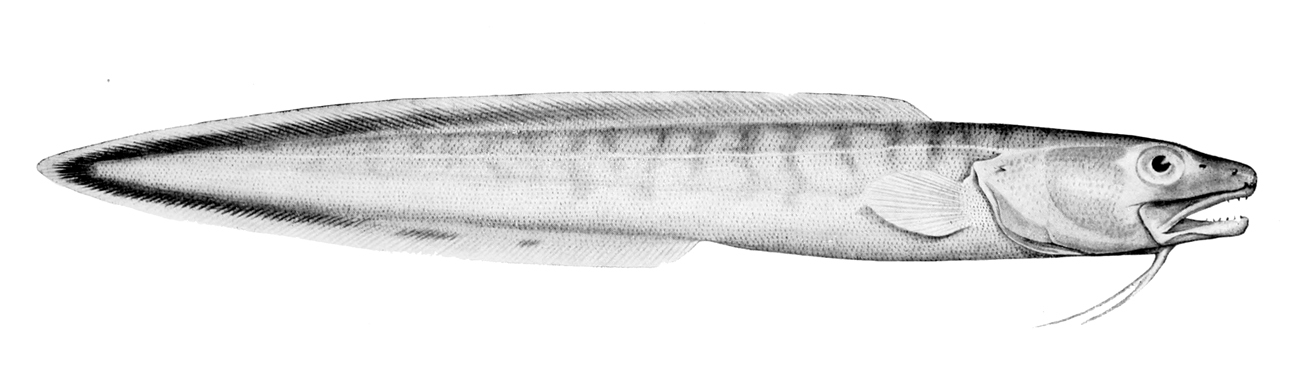

Conservation status
- Vulnerable (IUCN 3.1)

Scientific classification
- Kingdom: Animalia
- Phylum: Chordata
- Class: Actinopterygii
- Division: Teleostei
- Order: Ophidiiformes
- Family: Ophidiidae
- Genus: Genypterus
- Species: G. blacodes

Binomial name
- Genypterus blacodes (J. R. Forster, 1801)

Synonyms
- Ophidium blacodes Forster, 1801; Genypterus australis Castelnau, 1872; Genypterus microstomus Regan, 1903

= Pink cusk-eel =

Species of fish

The pink cusk-eel, Genypterus blacodes, is a demersal species of cusk-eel in the family Ophidiidae found in the oceans around southern Australia, Chile, Brazil, and around New Zealand except the east coast of Northland, in depths of 22 to 1,000 metres (70 to 3,280 ft; 10 to 550 fathoms). It is found in the Chilean Patagonia fjords, one of the least researched ocean regions in the world.

Other names for the pink cusk-eel include ling, Australian rockling, New Zealand ling, kingklip, pink ling, and northern ling. The South African kingklip is a similar, related species (Genypterus capensis)

== Species description ==
This species has a pinkish yellow body marbled with irregular reddish brown blotches dorsally, with no dorsal spines or anal spines. They have a small head and body with pinkish or orangish cast with irregular dark brown to gray blotches and mottlings and are whitish ventrally. Their body is elongated, and cylindrical with moderately small, elliptical eyes. Their mouth is large, terminal, slightly oblique, reaching to or well beyond the posterior margin of eye. They have lips that are thick and fleshy. Their jaws have an outer row of enlarged, canine-like and cardiform teeth of irregular size and spacing, and an inner band of smaller villiform teeth. They have a single, straight lateral line. Some specimens from Tasmanian waters have a distinct crimson abdomen.

They have developed rakers on the lower limb of the first gill arch. Snout with anterior nostrils forming a low tube above the upper lip near the tip. A strong spine is present on the upper operculum. Their scales are minute and cycloid, covering most of the body and head. Their length is up to 200 centimetres (79 in), and they can live for up to 39 years. Their maximum weight is 25 kilograms (55 lb).They have a sedentary life-style and are slow-growing, long-lived, relatively large and delayed maturity.

== Distribution ==
The pink cusk-eel is found exclusively in the southern hemisphere. Their range extends from New Zealand, southern coast of Australia from New South Wales to western Australia, and to southern South America from Argentina to southern Chile. The first official pink cusk-eel landings in Chile were recorded four decades ago, in 1978. In Chile, pink cusk-eel is distributed from 32°00′S to the last tip of Patagonia at 57°00′S

Pink cusk-eel populations are divided into northern and southern stocks, each with significantly different life history traits. There has been no evidence of large-scale movements. In the month-long NORFANZ Expedition of 2003 which was examining the biodiversity of the seamounts and slopes of the Norfolk Ridge near New Zealand, a single specimen weighing 6.3 kg (13 lb 14 oz) was collected.

== Biology ==
Age determinations, based on the reading of saggital otoliths, were between 1 and 14 years in males and between 1 and 16 years in females in the Chilean austral zone. Statistical differences in growth were found between the sexes and management fishing zones. Juveniles of this species are found in shallower shelf waters.

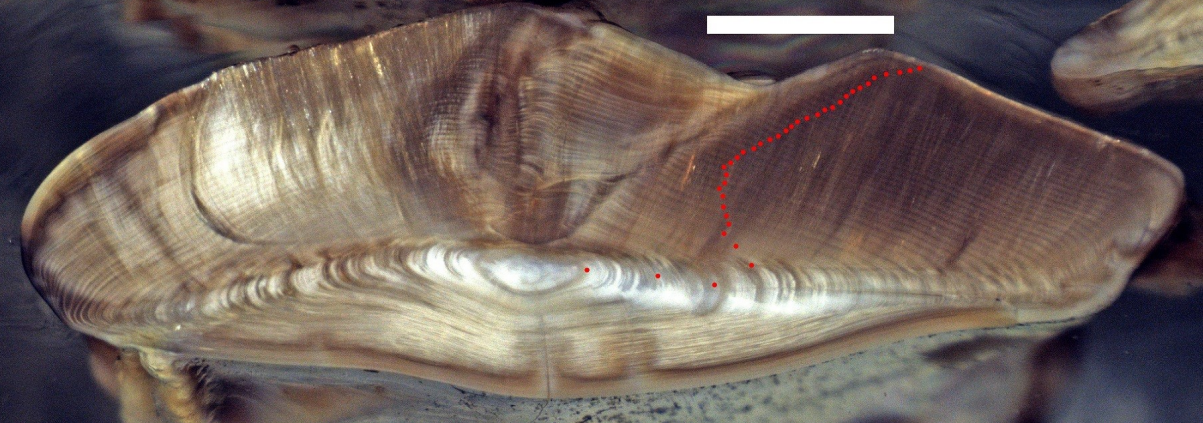
Otolith cross-section of a male ling

It has been noted that males grow significantly faster than females. Females actively search for food, aiming to recover energy after spawning. Fish that continue to feed during the reproductive season are known as income breeders and typically have reproduction characterized by asynchronous ovary development. They have a deep connection between feeding and reproductive strategy.

This species is oviparous, and its eggs float on the surface in a pelagic mass. Females have a gonadal development of the asynchronous type with indeterminate fecundity due to the presence of different types of oocytes in the same ovarian tissue.

== Diet ==
This species feeds on crustaceans, such as the lobster krill Munida gregaria, isopods (Cirolana spp., Serolidae), stomatopods (Pterygosquilla armata) and gammarid amphipods. Fish are also eaten by the cusk-eel, such as the notothenioid Patagonotothen ramsayi and the Argentine hake (Merluccius hubbsi). It was also reported to have fed on cephalopods. It has been caught on the bottom during the spawning season of the blue grenadier (Macruronus novaezelandiae) while feeding on the species.

In northern regions G. blacodes preyed mainly upon fish followed by crustaceans, whereas in southern regions crustaceans were the main prey group, followed by fish and cephalopods. Juvenile specimens of pink cusk-eel feed mainly on crustaceans.

G. blacodes presents a digestive tract typical of a carnivorous benthonic fish.

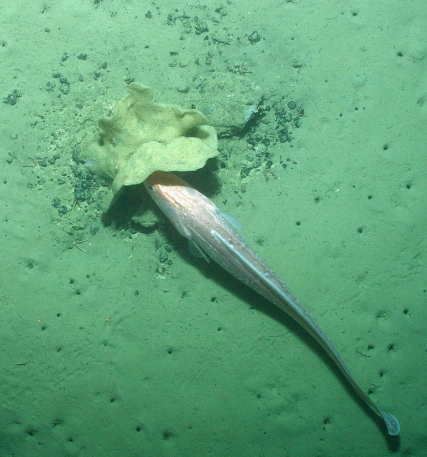
Pink cusk-eel hiding under a sponge

== Conservation ==
G. blacodes is considered an endangered species in Chile.

== Commercial fishing ==
The pink cusk-eel is of major importance to commercial fisheries, with catches in 2011 amounting to 38,451 tonnes (42,385 short tons). It is utilized fresh, frozen or smoked, and can be fried or baked.

G. blacodes is a species that has great farming potential in Chile, due to the exceptional quality of its flesh and high commercial value. This fish supports an important commercial fishery in Chile where it is exploited over an extensive geographic area. It is important in terms of landings and target intention.

It has been intensively fished since the late 1970s between Talcahuano (36°44′S) and south of Cape Horn 'Cabo de Hornos' (57°00′S), however, fisheries logbooks indicate that catches take place mostly in the austral zone (41°28′–57°00′).

== Aquaculture ==
The ling, Genypterus blacodes, is an important and abundant commercial species on the New Zealand continental shelf and also supports fisheries off Chile, Argentina, the Falkland Islands, and Australia.

Little is known regarding the nutritional requirements and feed ingredients, which has been recognized as one of the main critical limitations to be overcome for aquafeed development.

Feeding studies to assess the nutritional value of the novel ingredient Schizochytrium limacinum for G. blacodes have been performed. S. limacinum is a heterotrophic microalgae commercially available and sustainably produced that can produce high levels of lipids rich in DHA (docosahexaenoic acid). This microalgae has been assessed successfully as a replacement for fish oil in aquaculture feeds for other fishes.

Studies are being conducted to assess potential in cusk-eel grown to harvestable weight class and to determine the effects of whole-cell S. limacinum meal on nutrient digestibility and fatty acid concentrations of muscle tissue in the diet of pink cusk-eel.
