= Patagonotothen squamiceps =

Scientific classification
- Kingdom: Animalia
- Phylum: Chordata
- Class: Actinopterygii
- Division: Teleostei
- Order: Perciformes
- Family: Nototheniidae
- Genus: Patagonotothen
- Species: P. squamiceps

Binomial name
- Patagonotothen squamiceps (Peters, 1877)

Synonyms
- Notothenia squamiceps Peters, 1877

Species of ray-finned fish

Patagonotothen squamiceps is a species of marine ray-finned fish in the family Nototheniidae, found off southern South America and the Falkland Islands. It is a benthic species associated mainly with shallow coastal habitats, although it has been recorded at depths of at least 116 m in Falkland Islands waters.

== Etymology ==
The specific epithet squamiceps is derived from the Latin squamus, meaning "scale", and -ceps, meaning "head", referring to the scales on the upper surface and sides of the head.

== Description ==
Patagonotothen squamiceps is a small notothenioid fish with a relatively deep body and a broad interorbital region. The head, including the cheeks, opercula and interorbital region, is partly covered with scales. It has 30–40 tubular scales in the upper lateral line and 13–16 gill rakers on the lower limb of the first branchial arch. The jaws are approximately equal in length, although the lower jaw may project slightly. These characters help distinguish it from the closely related Patagonotothen sima.

Its colouration is generally brownish, sometimes with indistinct darker cross-bars and pale rounded spots on the back and sides. The pectoral fins are yellowish and the pelvic fins may be partly blackish. The dorsal, anal and caudal fins may bear darker markings or bands.

== Distribution and habitat ==
The species occurs off southern South America and the Falkland Islands. It was originally described from Punta Arenas in the Strait of Magellan, where the type specimen was collected at a depth of approximately 2–4 m. In the Falkland Islands it has been recorded from shallow coastal habitats, including Berkeley Sound, Port Louis, Port William and Stanley, at depths of 1–25 m. Specimens have been collected over mud, sand, gravel, stones and shells, as well as amongst algae.

The species is generally associated with shallow coastal habitats, particularly rocky substrates and macroalgal assemblages. In 2026, five specimens were collected as shelf-trawl bycatch in Falkland Islands waters at depths of 104–116 m, substantially extending its previously documented bathymetric range.

Colouration may vary with habitat; Lönnberg observed that specimens collected amongst algae were more variegated than those from other bottom types.

== Taxonomy ==
The species was described by German zoologist Wilhelm Peters in 1877 as Notothenia squamiceps, based on a specimen from Punta Arenas in the Strait of Magellan. It was subsequently confused with the closely related Notothenia sima (now Patagonotothen sima). Norman reassigned Falkland Islands specimens previously identified as N. sima to N. squamiceps, distinguishing the species by its deeper body, broader interorbital region with larger scales, greater number of gill rakers and differences in colouration.

Historical museum material also supports its occurrence in the Falkland Islands. A specimen collected in Berkeley Sound in 1902 is held by the Swedish Museum of Natural History, while two specimens collected at Stanley in 1893 and held by the Natural History Museum of Hamburg were subsequently identified as P. squamiceps. In 2026, two newly collected specimens were deposited in the Chilean National Museum of Natural History under catalogue numbers MNHNC-ICT8294 and MNHNC-ICT8295.
