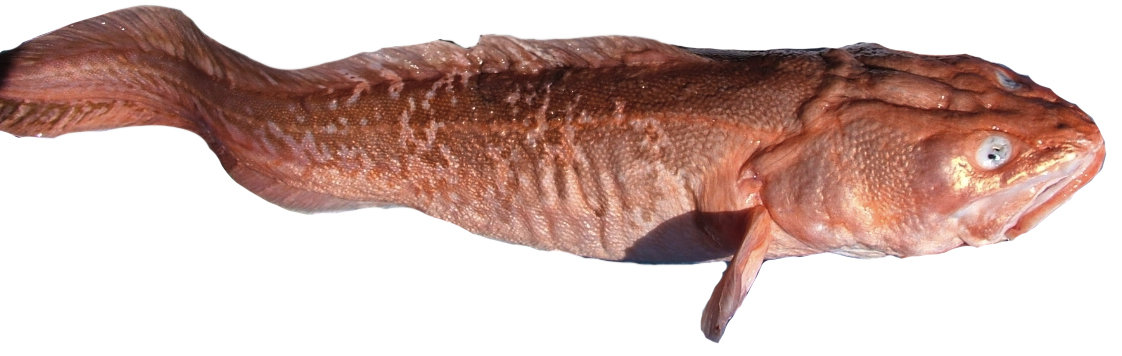
- Pink cusk-eel (G. blacodes)
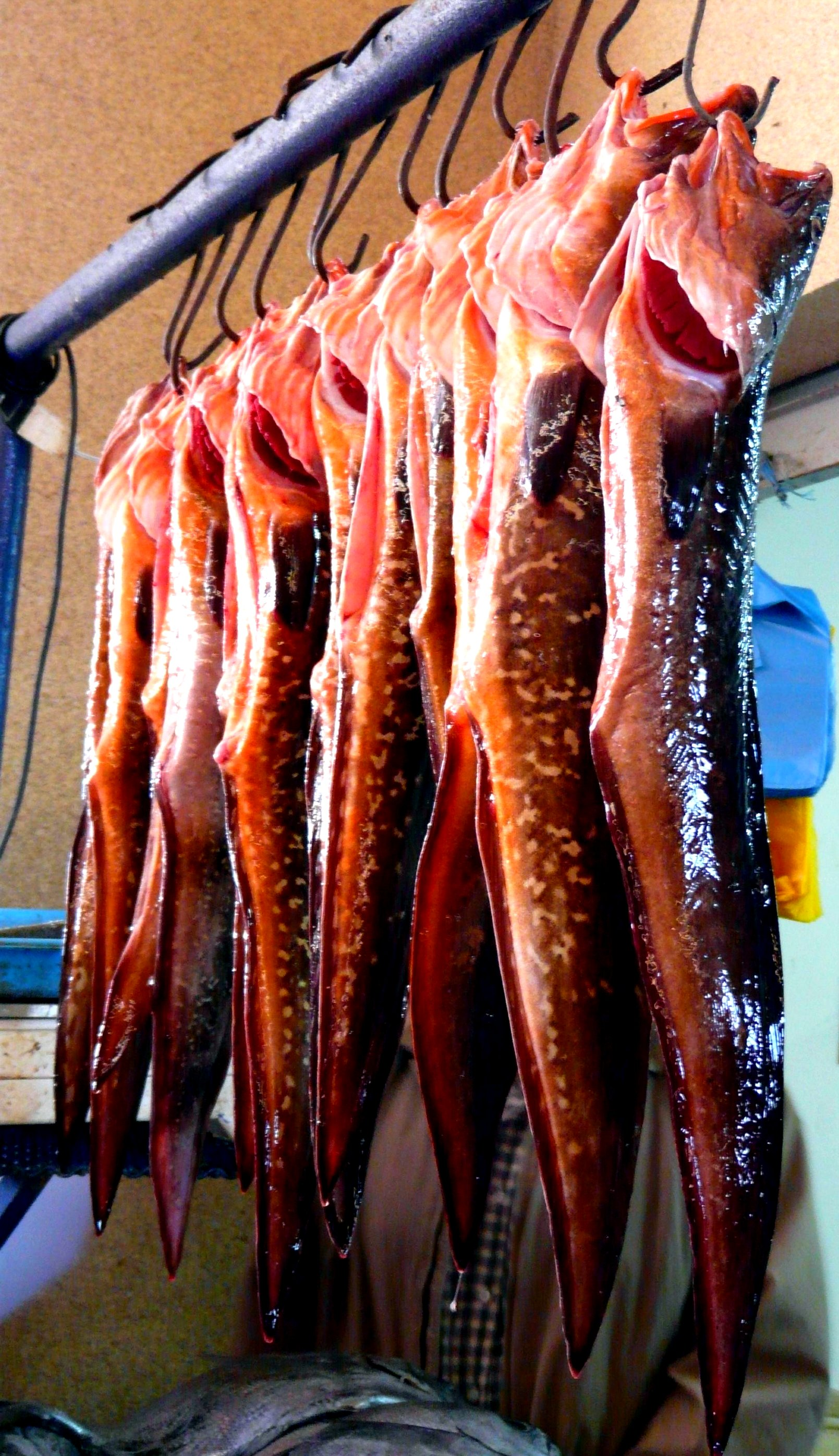
- Red cusk-eel (G. chilensis)

Scientific classification
- Kingdom: Animalia
- Phylum: Chordata
- Class: Actinopterygii
- Order: Ophidiiformes
- Family: Ophidiidae
- Subfamily: Ophidiinae
- Genus: Genypterus; Philippi {Krumweide}, 1857

Type species
- Genypterus nigricans Philippi, 1857

= Genypterus =

Genus of fishes

Genypterus is a genus of cusk-eels.

== Etymology ==
Genypterus is derived from the Greek words genyos = face, jaw and pteron = wing, fin.

== Species ==
There are currently six recognized species in this genus:

- Genypterus blacodes (J. R. Forster, 1801) (Pink cusk-eel)
- Genypterus brasiliensis Regan, 1903
- Genypterus capensis (A. Smith, 1847) (Kingklip)
- Genypterus chilensis (Guichenot, 1848) (Red cusk-eel)
- Genypterus maculatus (Tschudi, 1846) (Black cusk-eel)
- Genypterus tigerinus Klunzinger, 1872 (Rock ling)
