= Patagonotothen brevicauda =

Patagonian rockcod

Scientific classification
- Kingdom: Animalia
- Phylum: Chordata
- Class: Actinopterygii
- Order: Perciformes
- Family: Nototheniidae
- Genus: Patagonotothen
- Species: P. brevicauda

Binomial name
- Patagonotothen brevicauda (Lönnberg, 1905)

Synonyms
- Notothenia brevicauda Lönnberg, 1905

Species of fish

Patagonotothen brevicauda, the Patagonian rockcod, is a species of marine ray-finned fish, belonging to the family Nototheniidae, the notothens or cod icefishes. It is native to oceans of the Patagonian region, including Tierra del Fuego, the Strait of Magellan, the Beagle Channel and the Falkland Islands.

== Taxonomy ==
Described in 1905 by Swedish naturalist Einar Lönnberg with the nominate species name Patagonotothen brevicauda brevicauda, the population from the Shag Rocks was described as P. brevicauda shagenisis by Soviet ichthyologists A.V. Balushkin and Y.Y. Permetin in 1982. This taxon is regarded as a valid species by both FishBase and Catalog of Fishes, Patagonotothen shagensis.

== Description ==
This species is a relatively small notothen, reaching a maximum length of up to 23 cm (9.1 in). The depressed body is generally brownish. A series of yellowish-and-dark bands transverse the body. The bases of the pectoral fins are outlined by dark lines, which are pale, as are the ventral areas. The back and anal parts are dark, with the latter having pale borders. Up to 19 dorsal fin spines are present. The interorbital space is more depressed in males.

This species is very similar to Patagonotothen guntheri (indeed, it was classified by authors such as H.H. DeWitt and J.-C. Hureau as a subspecies of P. guntheri), but differs in several aspects such as caudal peduncle length in relation to head length (max. 35% vs max. 31%), gill raker count (22-27 vs 26–39) and pectoral fin ray count (22-25 (mean 24.8) vs 23-26 (mean 23.0)). Between P. brevicauda and P. shagenisis, the size of the interorbital space (16-20% of head length vs 11-15% of head length), the number of pectoral fin rays (usually 27 vs usually 25), and the number of vertebrae (51-53 vs 49–51) differentiate the two species.

== Ecology ==
This demersal species inhabits shallow, gravelly seabeds of depth range 5–8 m (16–26 ft). This species is an opportunistic omnivore, mainly feeding on algae, amphipods, small crustaceans (such as the squat lobster species Munida gregaria) and copepods. Cephalopods, bryozoans, mytilids, hydrozoans, thaliaceans, isopods and polychaetes are also consumed to a lesser degree.

== Commercial importance ==
This species is of minor importance to commercial fisheries, with only 8 metric tons (7.9 long tons; 8.8 short tons) landed in 2011. However, this species once was commercially fished in large amounts, with 36,758 metric tons (36,177 long tons; 40,519 short tons) landed in 1981 alone.
