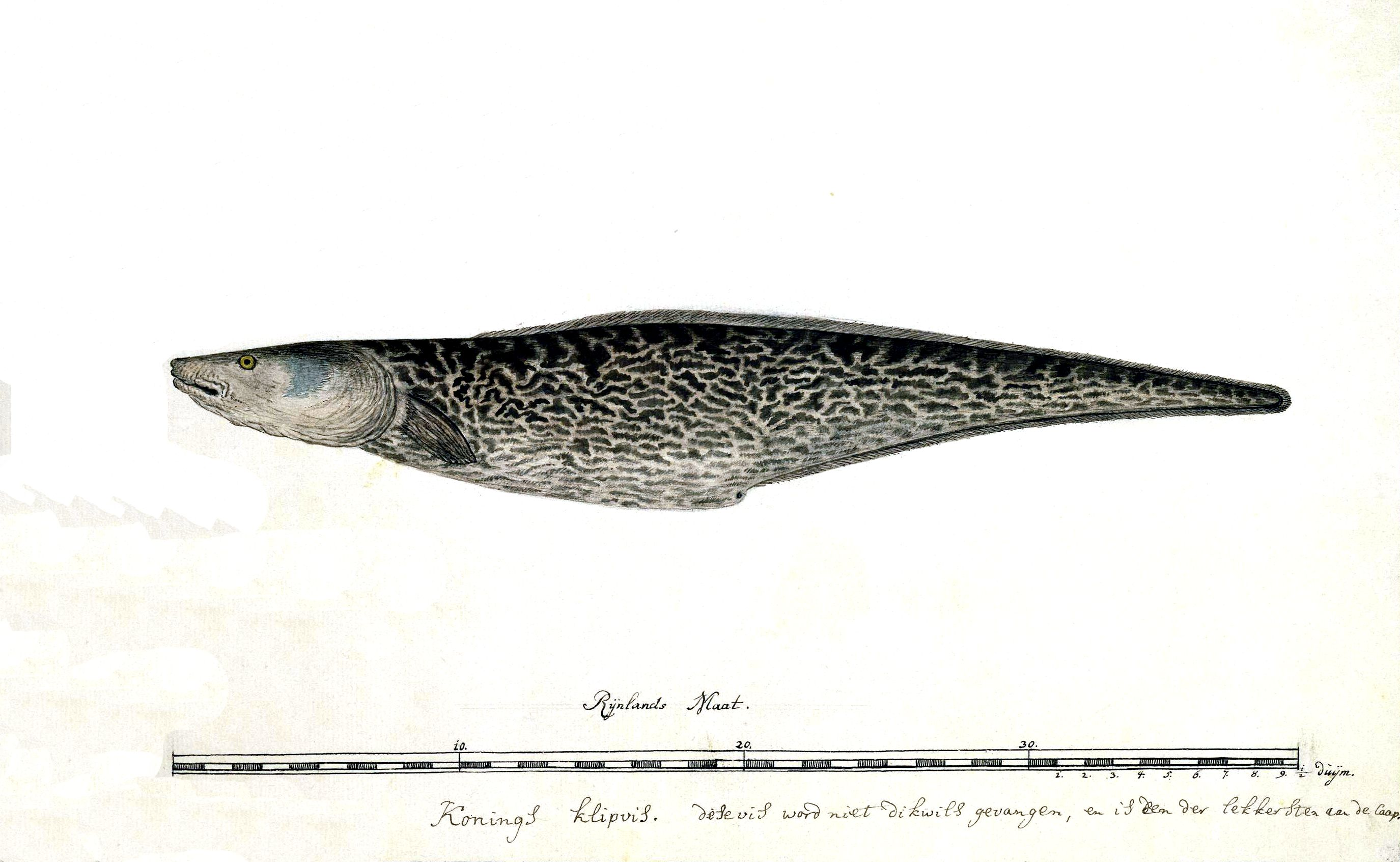

Scientific classification
- Kingdom: Animalia
- Phylum: Chordata
- Class: Actinopterygii
- Division: Teleostei
- Order: Ophidiiformes
- Family: Ophidiidae
- Genus: Genypterus
- Species: G. capensis

Binomial name
- Genypterus capensis (A. Smith, 1847)

Synonyms
- Xiphiurus capensis Smith, 1847; Hoplophycis lalandi Kaup, 1858

= Kingklip =

Species of fish from the South African coast

Genypterus capensis, commonly known as kingklip, is a species of cusk eel occurring along the Southern African coast from Walvis Bay in Namibia to Algoa Bay in South Africa. It is closely related to Genypterus blacodes from New Zealand. The species grows to a maximum length of 180 cm (71 in) and a weight of 15 kg (33 lb). It is one of the most popular fish items on South African menus. Despite appearances, it is not closely related to the eels of the order Anguilliformes.

Kingklip occur at depths of 50–500 m (160–1,640 ft), but usually in the range of 250–350 m (820–1,150 ft). They are bottom-dwelling and inhabit rocky localities on the shelf and upper continental slope. Juveniles are more often found in shallow waters. They feed on dragonets, mantis shrimps, hake, squid, and various fish species. Spawning usually takes place from August to October. The species is oviparous, with oval pelagic eggs floating in a gelatinous mass. Their dorsal soft rays number 150, while the anal soft rays number 110. The head and body are normally pink to orange in colour, with dark blotches dorsally.

Andrew Smith, the redoubtable Scots explorer and zoologist, first described the kingklip species in 1847 from a specimen caught near the entrance to Table Bay and named it Xiphiurus capensis ('xiphos'=sword, 'oura'=tail). His description was published in "Illustrations of the zoology of South Africa", an account of the natural history objects he collected during his expedition into the interior of South Africa in 1834-36. It was also described by the German naturalist Johann Jakob Kaup in 1858 and named Hoplophycis lalandi.

Kingklip were heavily exploited in the 1980s, and populations have not yet recovered so that some precautions are in place. Being relatively slow-growing and long-lived, stocks cannot sustain the pressure of targeted fishing, and are taken only as a bycatch species. It is one of the economically important species to South African fisheries. The related species from New Zealand, Genypterus blacodes, has made its way to South African markets and is retailed as kingklip. Kingklip's lack of obvious scales has sparked lively and ongoing debate in Jewish circles as to whether it qualifies as kosher or treif.

A 12-month study on larval development in the southern Benguela Current suggested that there are different spawning strategies for the western Agulhas Bank and the West Coast. On the Agulhas Bank, spawning is initiated by a decrease in sea surface temperature, whereas on the West Coast, spawning only occurs when upwelling has decreased, i.e., between June and December. Females grow larger than males in both areas, but are slower growing.
