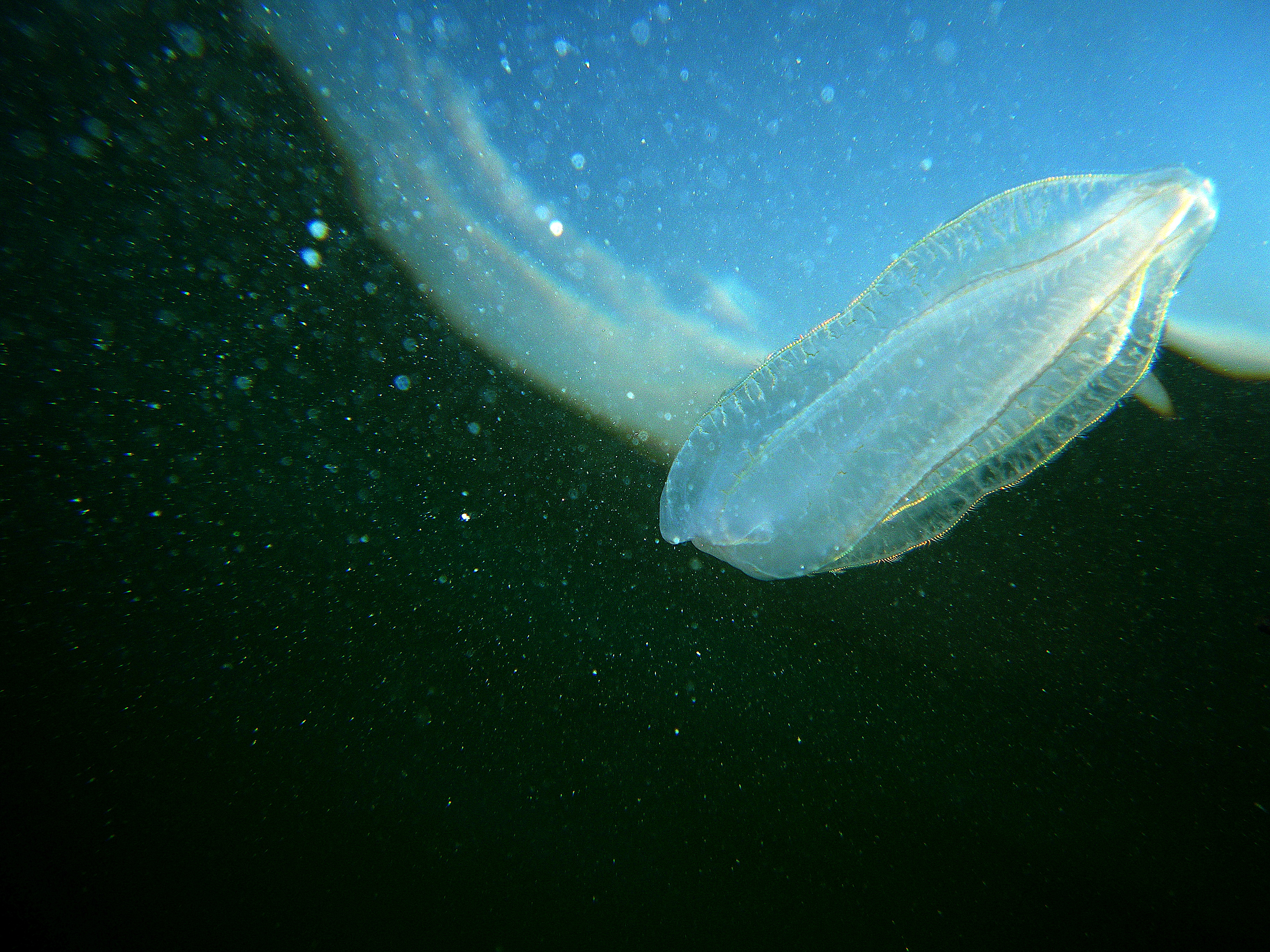
- In the Black Sea

Scientific classification
- Kingdom: Animalia
- Phylum: Ctenophora
- Class: Nuda
- Order: Beroida
- Family: Beroidae
- Genus: Beroe
- Species: B. ovata

Binomial name
- Beroe ovata Bruguière, 1789

= Beroe ovata =

Species of comb jelly

Beroe ovata is a comb jelly in the family Beroidae. It is found in the South Atlantic Ocean and the Mediterranean Sea and has been introduced into the Black Sea, the Aegean Sea, the Sea of Azov and the Caspian Sea. It was first described by the French physician and zoologist Jean Guillaume Bruguière in 1789.

== Description ==
Beroe ovata grows to a total length of about 16 cm (6 in). In shape it is roughly oval or cylindrical, but can be flattened like a mitten or deformed. At one end, known as the oral end, is the large mouth and at the other (aboral) end is a statocyst which has a sensory role and is involved in maintaining the animal's equilibrium. The body wall is composed of a gelatinous mesoglea sandwiched between two layers of cells. It is translucent and pale blue, or sometimes pale pink. On the exterior surface, eight longitudinal rows of cilia form the "combs", and it is these cilia, beating in unison, that propel the animal through the water. It usually moves with the mouth at the front but can reverse the direction of travel. This comb jelly has no tentacles. The internal gastric cavity is connected to a network of canals forming a meshwork in the mesoglea.

== Distribution ==
Beroe ovata is a pelagic species and has a wide distribution in the Atlantic Ocean and Mediterranean Sea. It is present in the southern Atlantic off both the coasts of Africa and of Brazil and has been observed in the northwestern Atlantic as far north as New Brunswick and the Chesapeake Bay. Its depth limit is about 100 m (328 ft) although it has been reported at a depth of 1,719 m (5,640 ft). It has been introduced into a number of seas in Eastern Europe including the Black Sea, the Aegean, the Sea of Azov and the Caspian Sea. The species has a high salinity tolerance ranging from 1.2% in the Caspian Sea to 3.3–3.7% at the surface of the Atlantic Ocean.

== Biology ==
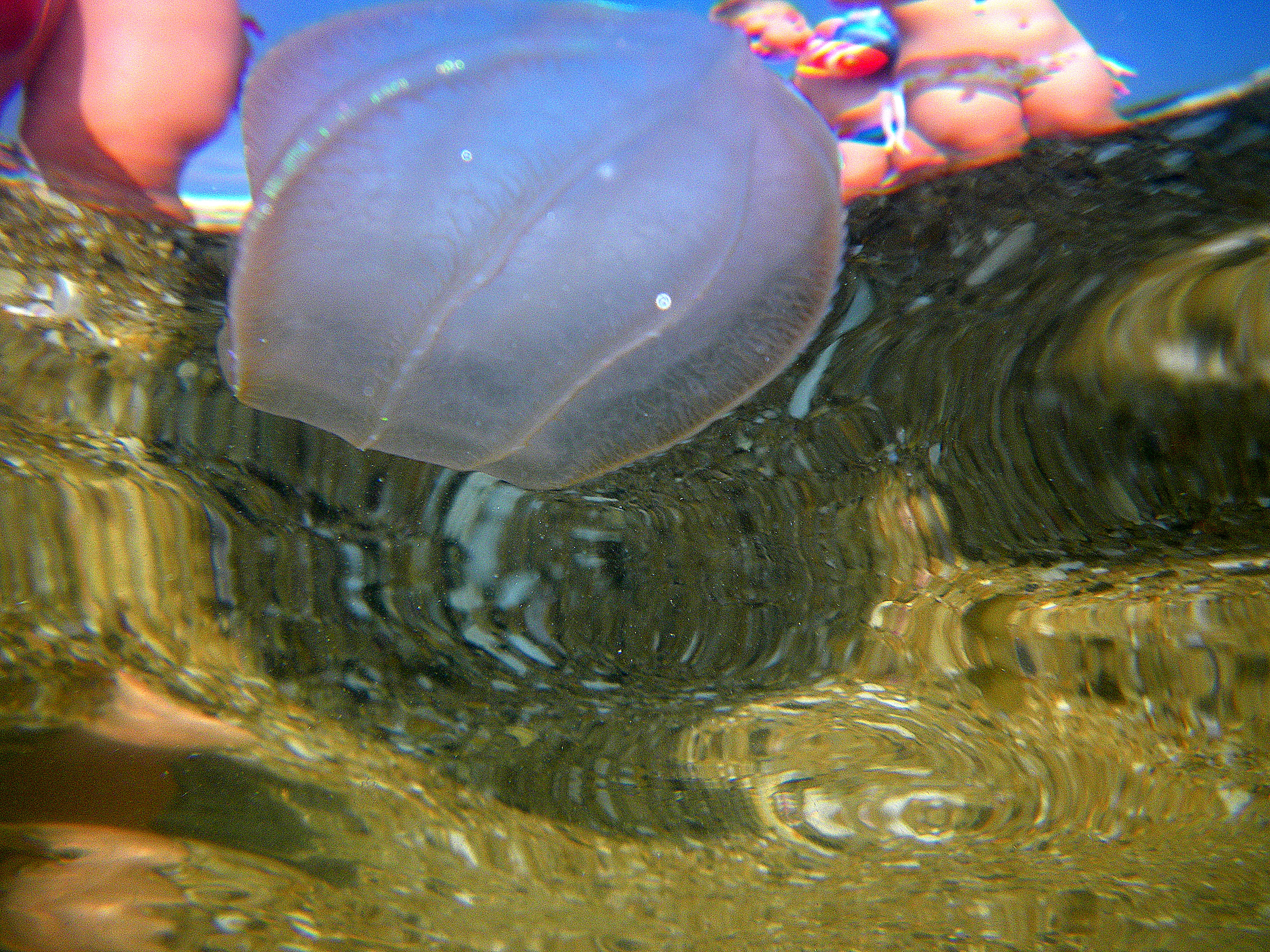
In shallow water in the Black Sea

Beroe ovata is a predator, opening its mouth wide and sucking in prey, sometimes as big or bigger than itself. The mouth is then closed and the prey digested in the gastric cavity. Its prey consists mostly of other comb jellies, mainly sea gooseberries such as Hormiphora plumosa and Pleurobrachia pileus. Under optimal conditions, Beroe ovata can eat as much as four times its body weight each day and has a maximum daily growth rate of 0.37 to 0.66.

Beroe ovata is a hermaphrodite, and the gonads are located under the rows of cilia. Gametes are liberated into the water and fertilisation is external. The eggs are large and transparent and the planktonic larvae pass through a number of developmental stages before adopting the adult form.

When the comb jelly Mnemiopsis leidyi was accidentally introduced into the Black Sea in the 1980s, it flourished and by 1989 there were as many as 400 individuals per cubic metre of water (more than 10 per cubic foot). These competed with native fish for food and also consumed their eggs and larvae, and the balance of the ecosystem was upset. Beroe ovata, which feeds on M. leidyi, was introduced as a biological pest control to try to redress the balance. This approach has been successful. The biomass of M. leidyi begins to build up in the Black Sea around July and August, which causes the population of B. ovata to rise sharply and consequently that of M. leidyi to fall to a level where it has little effect on the ecosystem. After the disappearance of B. ovata during the autumn, M. leidyi biomass again increases but to a much lower peak. The result is that the introduction of B. ovata has considerably shortened the time large numbers of M. leidyi are present in the plankton and therefore their predatory impact on the zooplankton.
