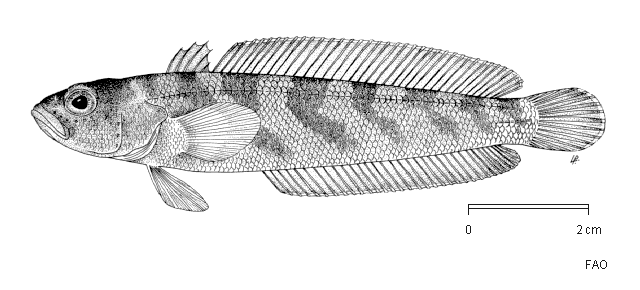
- Patagonotothen guntheri

Scientific classification
- Kingdom: Animalia
- Phylum: Chordata
- Class: Actinopterygii
- Order: Perciformes
- Family: Nototheniidae
- Genus: Patagonotothen; Balushkin, 1976

Type species
- Notothenia tessellata J. Richardson, 1845

= Patagonotothen =

Genus of fishes

Patagonotothen is a genus of marine ray-finned fishes, belonging to the family Nototheniidae, the notothens or cod icefishes. They are native to the southeast Pacific Ocean, southern Atlantic Ocean and the Southern Ocean.

== Taxonomy ==
Patagonotothen was first formally described in 1976 by the Soviet ichthyologist Arkadii Vladimirovich Balushkin with Notothenia tessellata, which had been described in 1845 by the Scottish naturalist, Arctic explorer and naval surgeon John Richardson with a type locality of the Falkland Islands, as the type species. Some authorities place this genus in the subfamily Nototheniinae, but the 5th edition of Fishes of the World does not include subfamilies in the Nototheniidae. The genus name is a compound of Patago, a reference to Patagonia, and notothen, indicating that this genus is part of the family Nototheniidae.

== Species ==
The 15 recognized species in this genus are:

- Patagonotothen brevicauda (Lönnberg, 1905) (Patagonian rockcod)
- Patagonotothen canina (Smitt, 1897)
- Patagonotothen cornucola (J. Richardson, 1844)
- Patagonotothen elegans (Günther, 1880)
- Patagonotothen guntheri (Norman, 1937) (yellowfin notothen)
- Patagonotothen jordani (W. F. Thompson, 1916)
- Patagonotothen kreffti (Balushkin & Stehmann, 1993)
- Patagonotothen longipes (Steindachner, 1876)
- Patagonotothen ramsayi (Regan, 1913) (longtail southern cod)
- Patagonotothen shagensis Balushkin & Permitin, 1982
- Patagonotothen sima (J. Richardson, 1845)
- Patagonotothen squamiceps (W. K. H. Peters, 1877)
- Patagonotothen tessellata (J. Richardson, 1845) (black southern cod)
- Patagonotothen thompsoni (Balushkin, 1993)
- Patagonotothen wiltoni (Regan, 1913)

== Characteristics ==
Patagonotothen fishes are small to medium-sized notothens which have small to moderately sized heads. The scales on the head vary in extent from almost totally unscaled to having scales over the crown, cheeks and gill covers. The skin on the head is smooth. Typically they have two lateral lines, although some species may have a third lower lateral line, and these are usually made up of tubed scales. The maximum total length varies from 11 cm (4.3 in) in P. cornucola to 44 cm (17 in) in P. ramsayi.

== Distribution, habitat and biology ==
Patagonotothen species are found in the waters off southern South America off Chile and Argentina as well as the Falkland Islands and South Georgia. They are demersal or benthopelagic fishes which feed mainly on zooplankton such as krill.
