= Patagonotothen elegans =

Scientific classification
- Kingdom: Animalia
- Phylum: Chordata
- Class: Actinopterygii
- Order: Perciformes
- Family: Nototheniidae
- Genus: Patagonotothen
- Species: P. elegans

Binomial name
- Patagonotothen elegans (Günther, 1880)

Synonyms
- Notothenia elegans Günther, 1880

Species of fish

Patagonotothen elegans is a species of marine ray-finned fish, belonging to the family Nototheniidae, the notothens or cod icefishes. It is native to the waters off southern South America in both the southeastern Pacific Ocean and the southwestern Atlantic, including the Falkland Islands.
