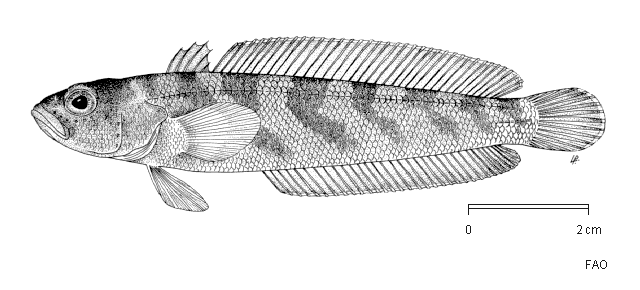
- Illustration

Scientific classification
- Domain: Eukaryota
- Kingdom: Animalia
- Phylum: Chordata
- Class: Actinopterygii
- Order: Perciformes
- Family: Nototheniidae
- Genus: Patagonotothen
- Species: P. guntheri

Binomial name
- Patagonotothen guntheri (Norman, 1937)

= Patagonotothen guntheri =

Yellowfin notothen

Species of fish

Patagonotothen guntheri, the yellowfin notothen, is a species of notothen found in the Argentinian region of Patagonia, the Falkland Islands, the Burdwood Bank and the Shag Rocks (where it is found in abundance) west of South Georgia on the continental shelf at depths of 120-250 m (394-820 ft), but may be found in waters deeper than 250 m in the Argentinian region.

== Etymology ==
This species was named in honor of Mr. E. R. Gunther, a fisheries biologist of the Discovery investigations, who made this discovery.

== Description ==
This species is a small notothen with lemon yellow caudal, pectoral and pelvic fins. The anal and dorsal fins are also yellow. All fins are lighter at the tips and the body is generally colored gray, with the snout and the top of the head being darker. 2 or 3 dark stripes extend across the cheek, and a horizontal stripe may be present above the eye. This species attains a maximum length of 23 cm (9 inches). Up to 9 cross-bars may form on the body after preservation.

This species is very similar to congener Patagonotothen brevicauda, however, it has more gill rakers (26 to 39 in total compared to 22 to 27 in total) and the difference between the number of pectoral fin rays (23-26 compared to 22–25, with a mean of 24.8 for P. guntheri and a mean of 23.0 for P. brevicauda) can also be used to distinguish between the two species.

== Ecology ==
This species is a benthopelagic predator which mainly feeds on krill (comprising 89% of total prey mass), but also takes amphipods. At around 3-4 years of age, females may spawn for the first time, with the Shag Rocks being a spawning hotspot.

== Commercial importance ==
This species was once very important to commercial fisheries, with 12, 000 tonnes (13, 228 tons) being landed in 1979 from the Shag Rocks alone. However, this is no longer the case; it is of little to no commercial importance at present.
