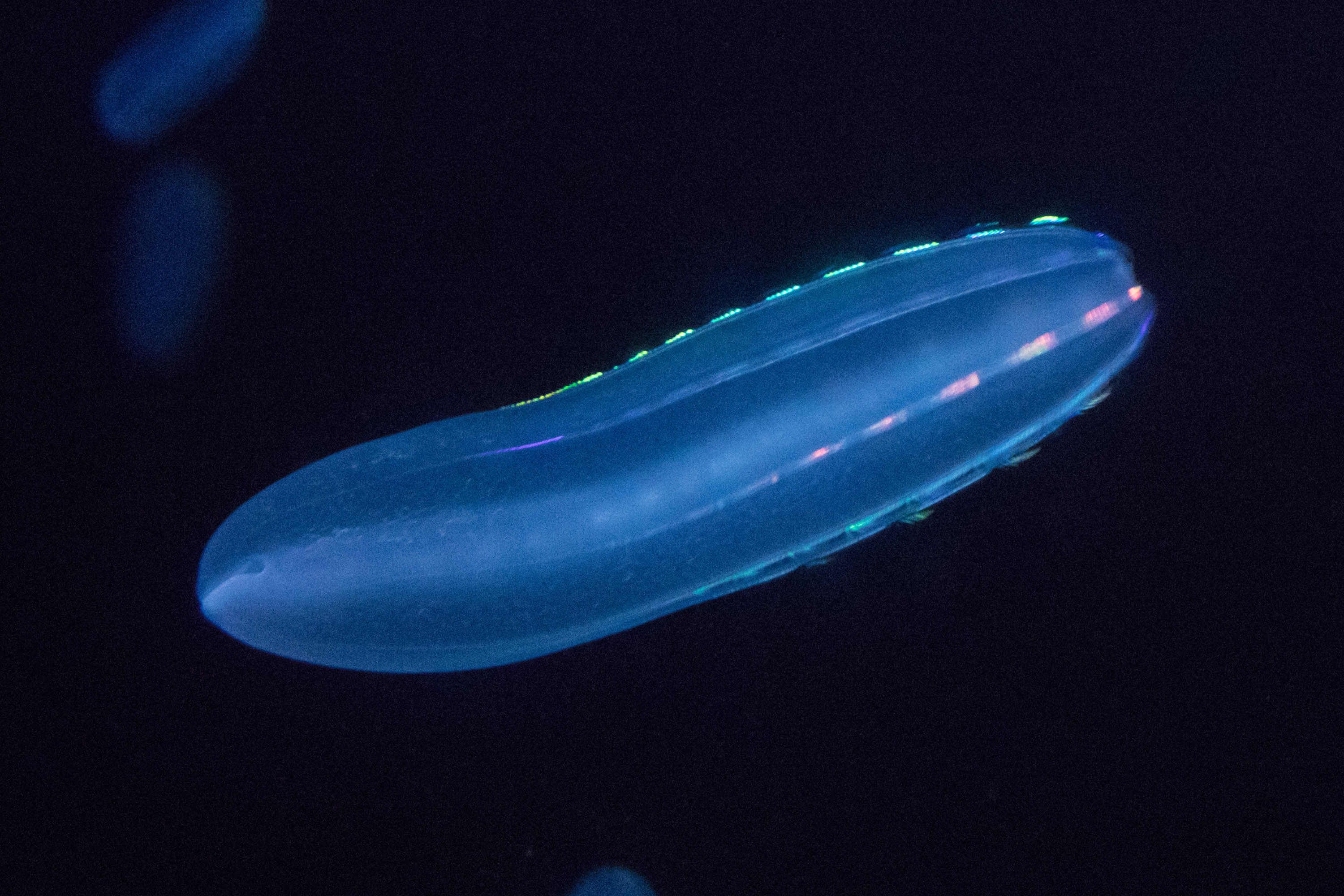
- Beroe abyssicola

Scientific classification
- Kingdom: Animalia
- Phylum: Ctenophora
- Class: Nuda
- Order: Beroida
- Family: Beroidae
- Genus: Beroe; Browne, 1756

Species
- See Text

Synonyms
- Idya Fréminville, 1809; Idyiopsis L. Agassiz, 1860

= Beroe (ctenophore) =

Genus of comb jellies

Beroe, commonly known as the cigar comb jellies, is a genus of comb jellies in the family Beroidae. Beroe exhibits bioluminescence.

== Anatomy ==
Inside the mouths of beroid ctenophores, macrocilia are present and essential for feeding. Each macrocillium contains multiple axonemes that are surrounded by a common membrane with a distinct capping structure at the distal tip. The cap structure consists of extensions of axonemal microtubules that are embedded in an electron dense matrix to form pointed projections or "teeth". During the beat cycle of macrocilia, these teeth shift from a straight to hooked configuration which is thought to aid ingestion and break up prey. These macrocilia are diverse amongst Beroe families and can be used to identify ctenophores by way of morphological differences.

== Species ==
According to the World Register of Marine Species, the following species are members of this genus:

- Beroe abyssicola Mortensen, 1927
- Beroe australis Agassiz & Mayer, 1899
- Beroe baffini Kramp, 1942
- Beroe basteri Lesson, 1830
- Beroe campana Komai, 1918
- Beroe compacta Moser, 1909
- Beroe constricta Chamisso & Eysenhardt, 1821
- Beroe cucumis Fabricius, 1780
- Beroe culcullus Martens, 1829
- Beroe cyathina A. Agassiz, 1860
- Beroe flemingii (Eschscholtz, 1829)
- Beroe forskalii Milne Edwards, 1841
- Beroe gilva Eschscholtz, 1829
- Beroe gracilis Künne, 1939
- Beroe hyalina Moser, 1907
- Beroe macrostoma Péron & Lesueur, 1808
- Beroe mitraeformis Lesson, 1830
- Beroe mitrata (Moser, 1907)
- Beroe ovale Bosc, 1802
- Beroe ovata Bruguière, 1789
- Beroe pandorina (Moser, 1903)
- Beroe penicillata (Mertens, 1833)
- Beroe ramosa Komai, 1921
- Beroe roseus Quoy & Gaimard, 1824
- Beroe rufescens (Eschscholtz, 1829)
