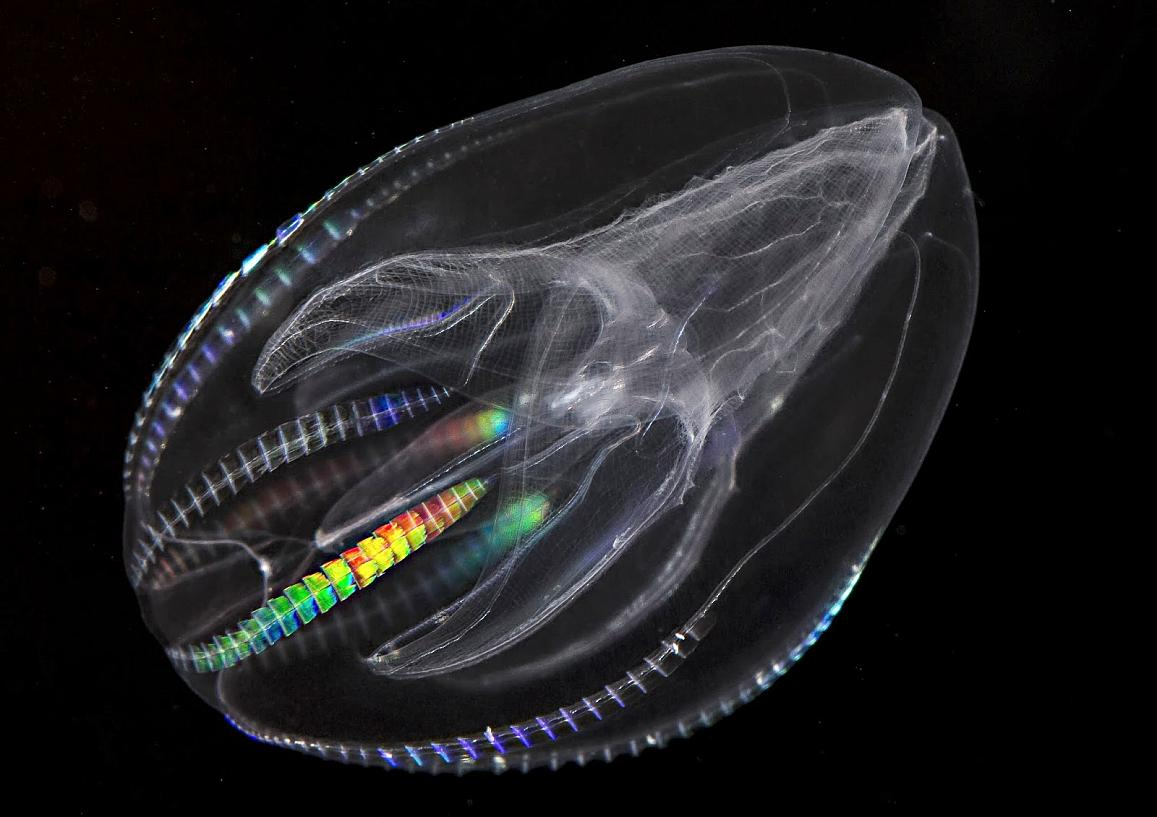

Scientific classification
- Kingdom: Animalia
- Phylum: Ctenophora
- Class: Tentaculata
- Order: Lobata
- Family: Bolinopsidae
- Genus: Mnemiopsis; Agassiz, 1860
- Species: M. leidyi

Binomial name
- Mnemiopsis leidyi A. Agassiz, 1865

Synonyms
- Mnemiopsis gardeni Agassiz, 1860; Mnemiopsis mccradyi Mayer, 1900

= Mnemiopsis =

Genus of comb jellies

Mnemiopsis leidyi, the warty comb jelly or sea walnut, is a species of tentaculate ctenophore (comb jelly). It is native to western Atlantic coastal waters, but has become established as an invasive species in European and western Asian regions. Three species have been named in the genus Mnemiopsis, but they are now believed to be different ecological forms of a single species M. leidyi by most zoologists.

== Description and ecology ==
Mnemiopsis have an oval-shaped and transparent lobed body, with eight rows of ciliated combs that run along the body vertically and glow blue-green when disturbed. They have several feeding tentacles. Unlike cnidarians, Mnemiopsis does not sting. Their body comprises 97% water. They have a maximum body length of roughly 7–12 centimetres (3–5 in) and a diameter of 2.5 centimetres (1 in).

It is euryoecious, tolerating a wide range of salinity (2 to 38 psu), temperature (2–32 °C or 36–90 °F), and water quality.

Mnemiopsis is a carnivore that consumes zooplankton including crustaceans, other comb jellies, and eggs and larvae of fish. Many of its predators are vertebrates, including birds and fish. Others are members of gelatinous zooplankton such as Beroe ctenophores and various Scyphozoa (jellyfish).

The comb jelly has the capacity for self-fertilization, as they are hermaphroditic. They have gonads that contain the ovary and spermatophore bunches in their gastrodermis. It carries 150 eggs along each meridional canal. Eggs and sperm are released into the water column where fertilization takes place. The spawning commences at late evening or at 1:00 or 2:00 a.m. The spawning eggs develop a thick outer layer within a minute of encountering seawater. As many as 10,000 eggs are produced from large specimens in areas with abundant prey. Egg production can start when the animals reach about 15 mm in length. Egg production increases with ctenophore size, and it is unclear when senescence occurs. Indeed, much like the so-called immortal jellyfish, Mnemiopsis leidyi can undergo reverse development, namely reverting into a previous life cycle stage.

It has a transient anus, which means that it appears only during defecation. There is no permanent connection between the gut and the rear of the body. Instead, as waste accumulates, part of the gut starts to balloon out until it touches the outer layer, or epidermis. The gut then fuses with the epidermis, forming an anal opening. Once excretion is complete, the process is reversed and the anus vanishes. The animals defecate at regular intervals: once an hour in the 5-centimetre-long adults, and once every 10 minutes or so in the larvae.

The species moves so slowly that it is referred to as "sea walnut".

In 2024 it was described to possess the ability be biological immortal by undergoing reverse development after the onset of sexual reproduction from mature lobate to early cydippid, similar to Turritopsis dohrnii and other jellyfish with this ability from the Cnidaria phylum and the only one known from the Cteniphora phylum.

== As an invasive species ==
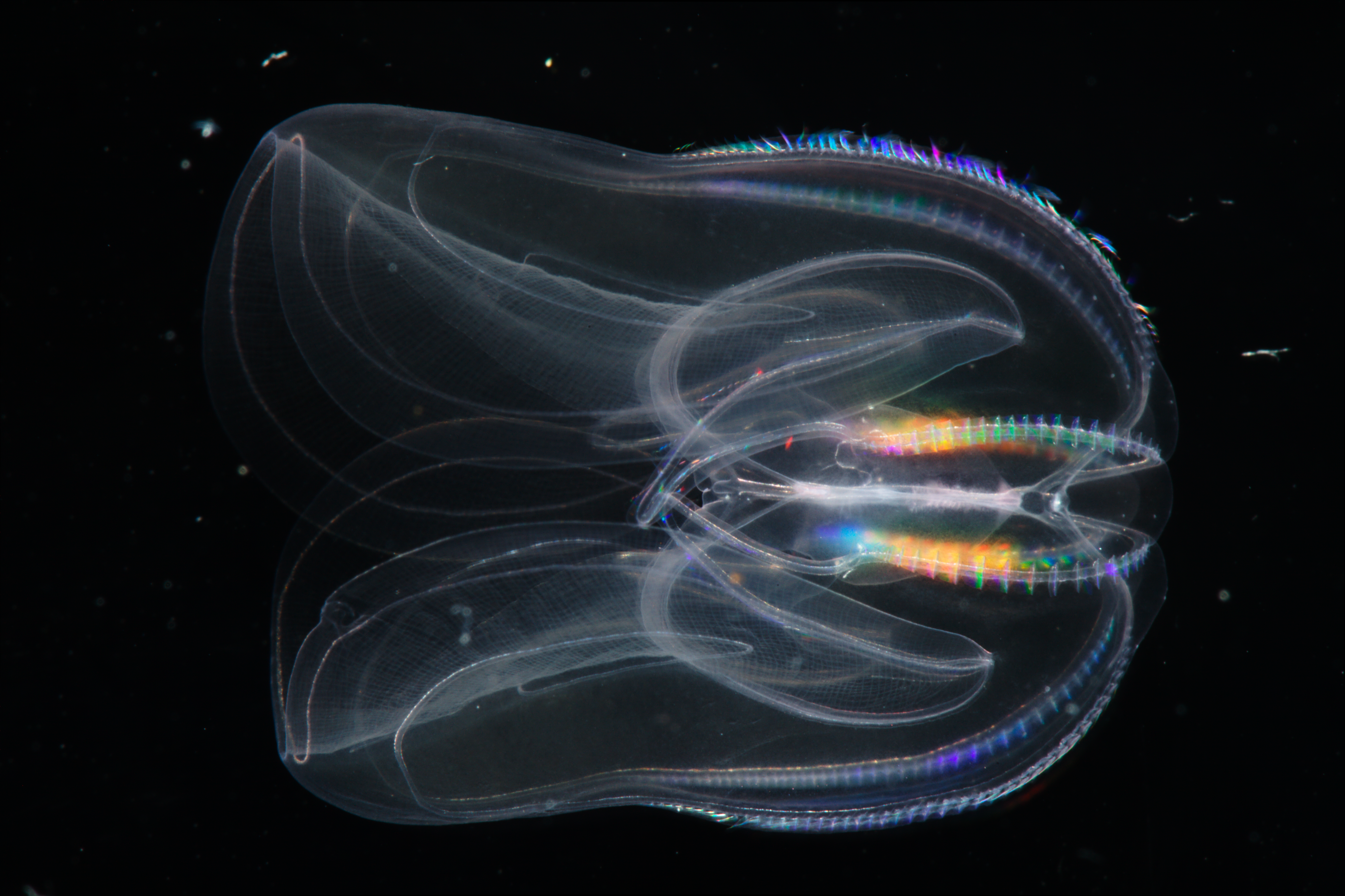
Mnemiopsis leidyi

=== 1980s – Black Sea ===
Mnemiopsis leidyi was introduced in the Black Sea in the 1980s, where only one species of comb jelly, the small sea gooseberry Pleurobrachia pileus, occurred until then. The most likely cause of its introduction is accidentally by merchant ships' ballast water. The first Black Sea record was in 1982.

By 1989, the Black Sea population had reached the highest level, with some 400 specimens per m^{3} of water (>10 animals/cubic foot) in optimal conditions. Afterwards, due to depletion of foodstocks resulting in lower carrying capacity, the population dropped somewhat.

In the Black Sea, M. leidyi eats eggs and larvae of pelagic fish. It caused a dramatic drop in fish populations, notably the commercially important anchovy Engraulis encrasicholus (known locally as hamsi, hamsiya, hamsa, etc.), by competing for the same food sources and eating the young and eggs. Biological control was tried with Beroe ovata, another comb jelly, with some degree of success; it appears as if a fairly stable predator-prey dynamic has been reached.

=== 1999 – Caspian Sea ===
In 1999 the species was introduced in the Caspian Sea via the Unified Deep Water System of European Russia. The establishment of this population led to a 60% reduction in the number of sprat, which in turn led to a reduction in the population of sturgeon and seals.

Worldwide distribution of Mnemiopsis leidyi. Native range in red, colonized areas in pink

=== 2006 – North and Baltic Seas ===
Since then, the species has apparently spread throughout the Mediterranean basin and the northwestern Atlantic. In 2006, it was first recorded in the North Sea, and since October 17, 2006 in the western Baltic Sea, namely the Kiel Fjord and The Belts. Up to 100 animals per cubic metre were counted in the Baltic, whereas the population density in the North Sea was at a much lower 4 animals/m^{3} at most.

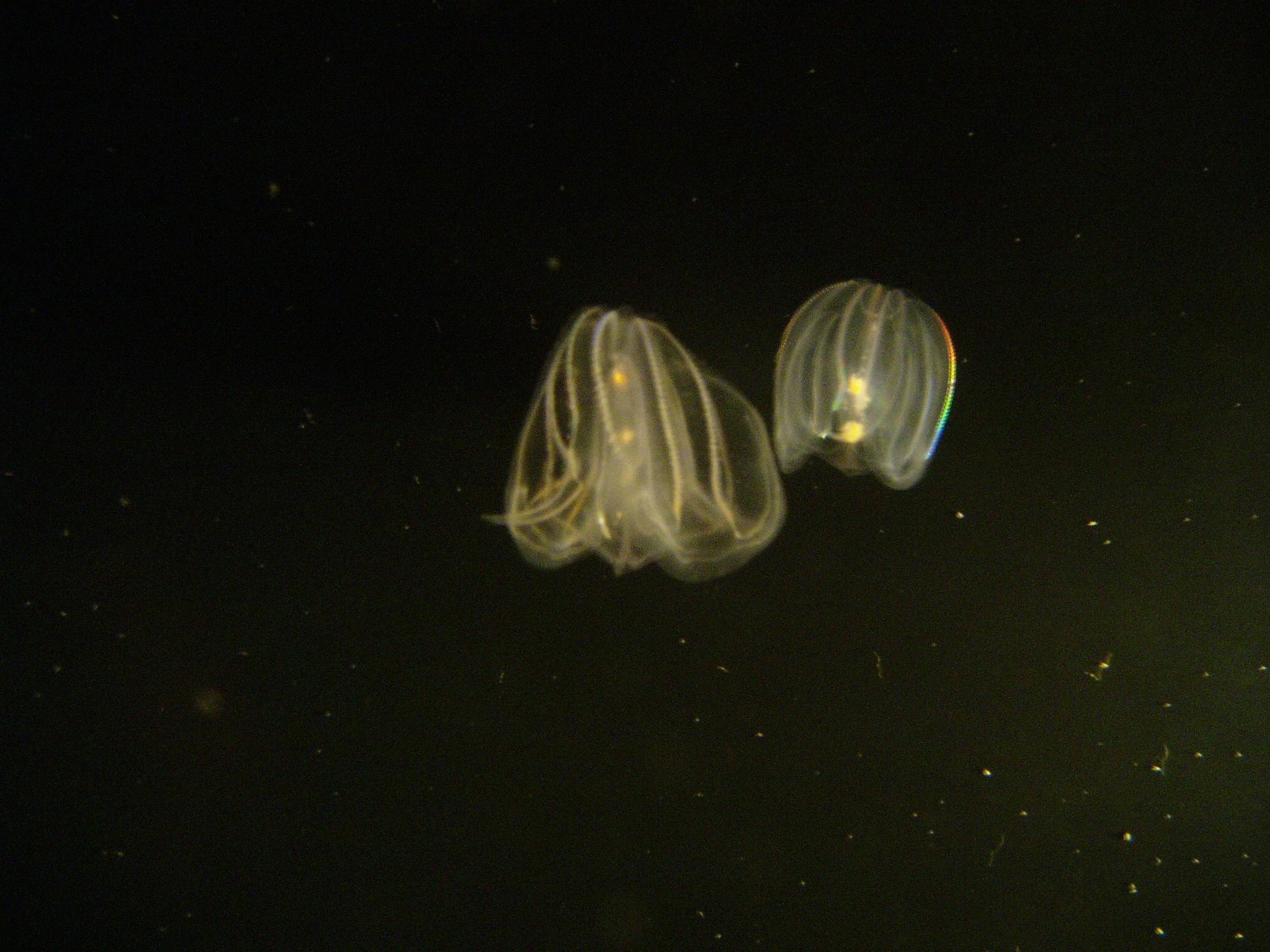
M. leidyi at the Monterey Bay Aquarium

One year later, the Baltic population of M. leidyi was found to have spread east to the Gotland Basin and the Bay of Puck. The impact of the species on the already heavily stressed Baltic ecosystem is unknown. The species overwinters in the deep waters where the temperature does not drop below 4 °C (39 °F); the fact that the Baltic is heavily stratified, with the waters above and below the halocline mixing little, is believed to aid its survival.

Apart from the widespread P. pileus, three comb jelly species occasionally drift into the Baltic from the North Sea but do not seem to be present as a stable population of significant size: Bolinopsis infundibulum, Beroe cucumis and Beroe gracilis. The second species might potentially be used for biological control.

The route of dispersal of M. leidyi to the North Sea/Baltic region is unknown. It might have occurred naturally by drifting individuals, or with ballast water of ships, either from its natural range or from the Black Sea, via the Mediterranean and eastern Atlantic. At least technically possible given the species' euryhaline habits is an alternative route of dispersal through continental Europe, being carried with ballast water in ships travelling from the Black Sea to the Rhine Estuary via the Rhine-Main-Danube Canal. The latter route is known to be the point of entry into continental Europe for numerous invasive freshwater neozoons from the Ponto-Caspian region, such as the zebra mussel, the quagga mussel, the amphipods Dikerogammarus villosus and Chelicorophium curvispinum, and the polychaete Hypania invalida.

== Genomics ==
Both the nuclear and mitochondrial genomes of Mnemiopsis leidyi have been sequenced, providing insight into the evolutionary position of Ctenophora (comb jellies).

In the original 2013 paper reporting the nuclear genome sequence, phylogenetic analysis of the presence and absence of genes, introns, and amino acid alignments suggested that the comb jelly is the sister lineage to the rest of all animals. However, a 2015 study applied different methodologies and found support for Porifera as the sister group to all other animals, and confirmed findings from the original study that amino acid alignments gave mixed support for this hypothesis. The position of Ctenophora and Porifera is currently being actively debated.

Its mitochondrion shows several interesting features. It is 10 kilobases in length making it the smallest animal mitochondrial DNA sequence known to date. It has lost at least 25 genes, including MT-ATP6 and all the tRNA genes. The atp6 gene has been relocated to the nuclear genome and has acquired introns and a mitochondrial targeting presequence. All tRNA genes have been genuinely lost along with nuclear-encoded mitochondrial aminoacyl tRNA synthetases. The mitochondrial rRNA molecules possess little similarity with their homologs in other organisms and have highly reduced secondary structures.

The genome of Mnemiopsis leidyi appears to lack recognizable microRNAs, as well as the nuclear proteins Drosha and Pasha, which are critical to canonical microRNA biogenesis. It is the only animal thus far reported to be missing Drosha. MicroRNAs play a vital role in the regulation of gene expression in all non-ctenophore animals investigated thus far except for Trichoplax adhaerens, one of three known members of the phylum Placozoa.

In Mnemiopsis leidyi, NOS is present both in adult tissues and differentially expressed in later embryonic stages suggesting the involvement of NO in developmental mechanisms. Ctenophores also possess soluble guanylyl cyclases as potential NO receptors with weak but differential expression across tissues. Combined, these data indicate that the canonical NO-cGMP signaling pathways existed in the common ancestor of animals and could be involved in the control of morphogenesis, cilia activities, feeding and different behaviors.

== Neurobiology ==
The first neural connectome of a ctenophore was reconstructed from the aboral organ of M. leidyi cydippid larva. Serial electron microscopy identified over 1,000 cells in the network. The reconstruction showed a synaptic nerve net of syncytial neurons that coordinates gravity-sensing balancer cilia, using as their sole source of feedback bridge cells. The circuit is not a sensory–motor reflex but shares parallels with ciliomotor control in annelid larvae.
