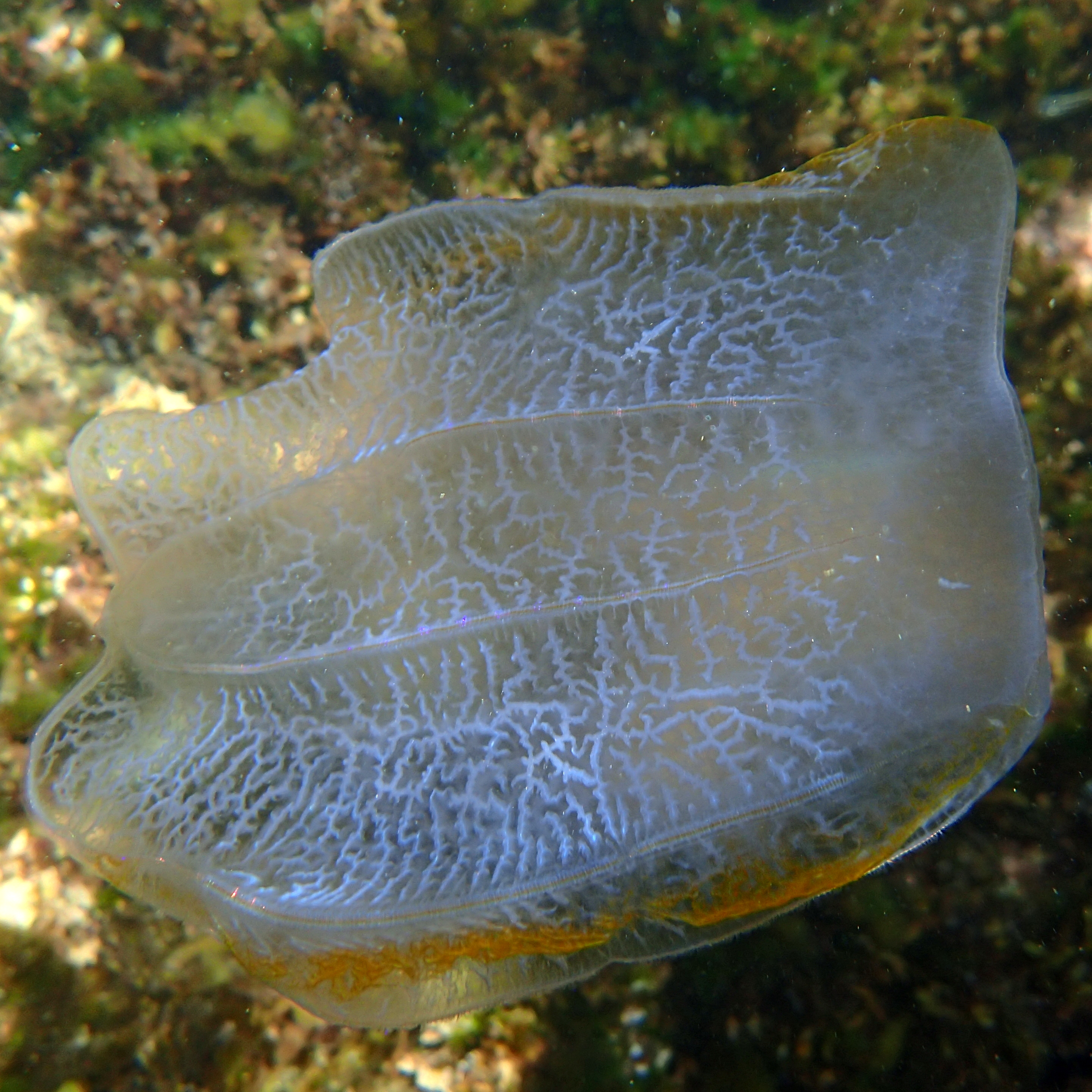
- Neis cordigera, Shelly Beach, Manly, Sydney, Australia

Scientific classification
- Kingdom: Animalia
- Phylum: Ctenophora
- Class: Nuda
- Order: Beroida
- Family: Beroidae
- Genus: Neis
- Species: N. cordigera

Binomial name
- Neis cordigera (Lesson, 1824)

= Neis =

Genus of comb jellies

Neis is a genus of nudan ctenophores. It is a monotypic genus containing the single species Neis cordigera. It occurs only near Australia. As all beroids, it is a free-swimmer that form part of the plankton.

Neis cordigera, commonly known as the Winged Pocket Comb Jelly, is among the largest species in the class, often exceeding 30 cm (12 in) in length. It is somewhat flattened and characterized by a pair of trailing gelatinous "wings" that extend beyond the aboral tip.

Like other comb jellies, the body wall of nudans consists of an outer epidermis and an inner gastrodermis, separated by a jelly-like mesoglea. The mesoglea has pigments that give many nudan species a slightly pink color; Neis cordigera may be yellowish or a deep orange-red. The aboral end is extended into two large lobes and the vascular system is undivided.

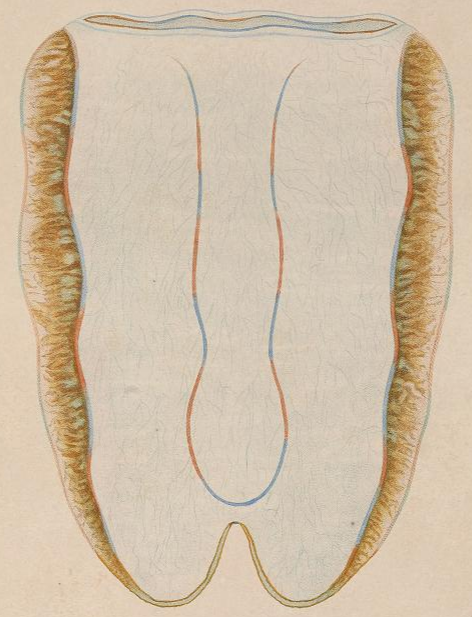
Neis cordigera drawing by René Primevère Lesson
