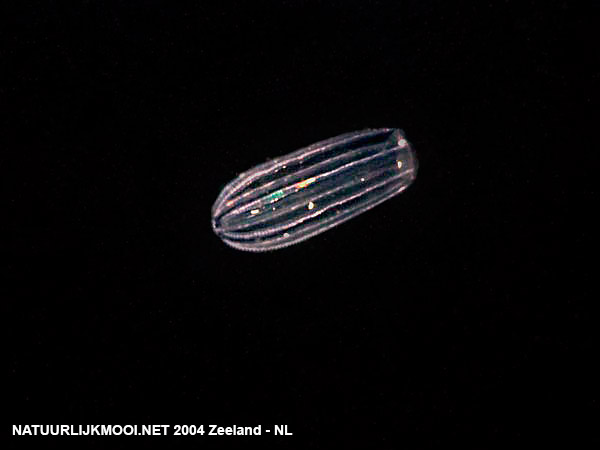

Scientific classification
- Kingdom: Animalia
- Phylum: Ctenophora
- Class: Nuda
- Order: Beroida
- Family: Beroidae
- Genus: Beroe
- Species: B. gracilis

Binomial name
- Beroe gracilis Künne, 1939

= Beroe gracilis =

Species of comb jelly

Beroe gracilis is a species of comb jelly in the family Beroidae. It is a free-swimming species found in the North Sea, the Atlantic Ocean and the Mediterranean Sea.

== Description ==
Beroe gracilis is a translucent, elongated, hollow, cylindrical animal with a maximum length of about 4 cm (1.6 in). Like the other members of the family Beroidae, it has no tentacles. The anterior end, with the gaping mouth at its tip, is slightly broader than the closed, posterior end. At the posterior end there is a statocyst, a flattened structure shaped like a figure-of-eight. From this, eight rows of combs with cilia radiate and extend three-quarters of the way along the body wall; it is the beating of these cilia that drive the animal forward, and their movement creates characteristic multicoloured sparkles. The general colour of the body wall is slightly milky, sometimes bluish or pinkish. The gut and its diverticula can be seen through the body wall.

== Distribution and habitat ==
Beroe gracilis occurs in the northeastern Atlantic Ocean, the North Sea, and the Mediterranean Sea, its range extending from Norway to Morocco, and also periodically in the Baltic Sea. It also occurs in the northeastern Pacific Ocean and cold deep waters off the Bahamas. In 1989 and 1990, and again in 2013, specimens were collected in the southeastern Pacific Ocean, off the coast of Chile, the first records from the Southern Hemisphere. This comb jelly forms part of the nekton, animals that actively swim rather than passively drift like plankton, and usually occurs in the top 100 m (330 ft) of the water column.

== Ecology ==
Beroe gracilis is a voracious predator, feeding almost exclusively on other comb jellies, such as Pleurobrachia pileus. It swims rapidly with its mouth open wide, drawing prey into its pharynx, and processing it with the help of specialised cilia; digestion is extracellular and takes place in the body cavity. The warty comb jelly Mnemiopsis leidyi has become invasive in European waters, and sometimes forms blooms in the North Sea and Baltic Sea; Beroe gracilis has been found to readily prey on M. leidyi, but was limited in controlling the alien species by being unable to ingest prey approaching its own size. Larger individuals of M. leidyi were sometimes partially consumed.
