= Burdwood Bank =

Undersea bank and channel in the South Atlantic Ocean

Coordinates: 54°15′00″S 59°00′00″W

The Burdwood Bank, called Namuncurá in Argentina and other countries, is an undersea bank with a prominence of approximately 200 metres (110 fathoms), part of the Scotia Arc projecting some 600 km (370 mi) from Cape Horn in the South Atlantic Ocean and located some 200 kilometres (120 mi) south of the Falkland Islands. Argentina claims economic rights over the whole of the bank, while the United Kingdom has designated about half of the bank as part of the Falklands Outer Economic Zone.

The Burdwood Bank is one of the four morphological features defined by the 200 metres (110 fathoms) isobath off the coast of southern South America — the other three being the Patagonian Shelf (Argentine Coastal Shelf), Isla de los Estados and the Falkland Islands. It forms a barrier to the northward flow of the Antarctic Circumpolar Current. The bank itself (as defined by the 200 metres; 110 fathoms isobath) is some 300 km (190 mi) from east to west and some 60 km (37 mi) from north to south. The channel to the west of the bank is about 80 km (50 mi) wide and 400 m (220 fathoms) deep while the channel to the east of the bank is 130 km (81 mi) wide and has a depth of up to 1,800 m (980 fathoms) deep.

Burdwood Bank was the location of several landslides some three million years ago. This in turn produced tsunami-like events that hit the Falkland Islands on its southern coast. Estimates of the size of the waves vary from up to 40 metres (130 ft) at the southern coast and up to 10 metres (33 ft) where the capital, Port Stanley, is located.

== Fauna ==
Birds in this area include various species of albatrosses and petrels that feed on the banks and waters of Burdwood Bank: black-browed albatross, grey-headed albatross, wandering albatross, Tristan albatross, northern giant petrel, southern giant petrel, chin petrel White, as well as penguins: Magellanic penguin, rockhopper penguin, gentoo penguin, king penguin, and pinnipeds such as sea lions and elephant seals. The Burdwood Bank generates conditions that favor fishing productivity in the area. In the waters surrounding the bank are breeding and spawning sites for many fish species. The species community on the bank is dominated by the small notothenids Patagonotothen guntheri and Patagonian toothfish. There are also very high levels of chlorophyll.
