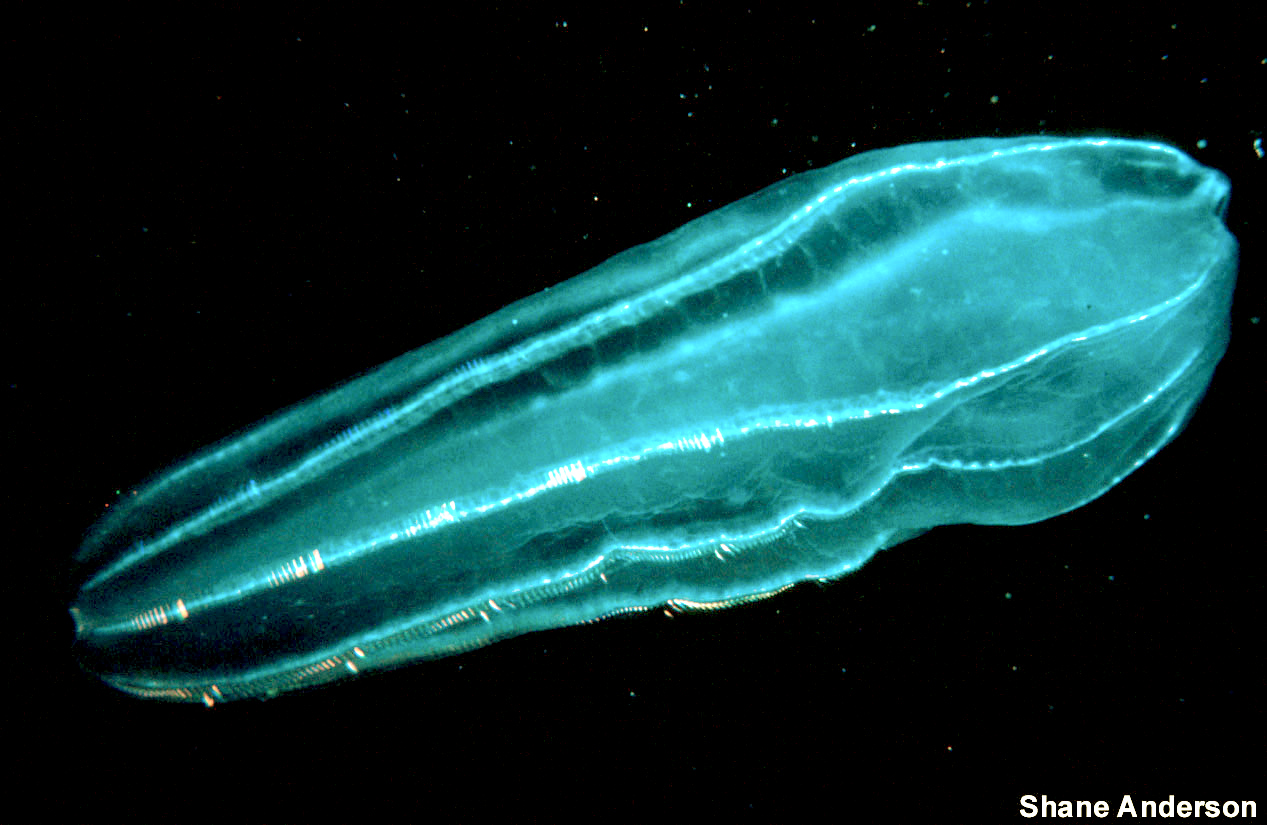

Scientific classification
- Kingdom: Animalia
- Phylum: Ctenophora
- Class: Nuda; Chun, 1879
- Order: Beroida; Eschscholtz, 1829
- Family: Beroidae; Eschscholtz, 1825

Genera
- Beroe; Neis

= Beroidae =

Family of comb jellies without tentacles

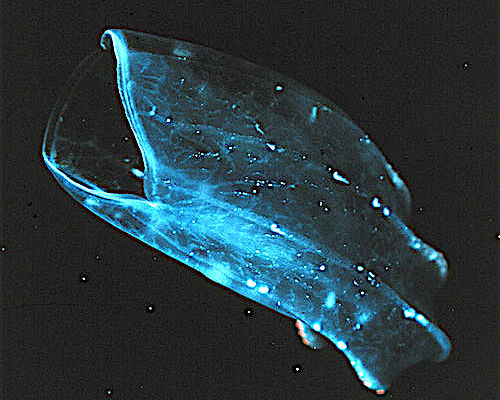
A beroid ctenophore with mouth gaping at left

Beroidae is a family of ctenophores or comb jellies more commonly referred to as the beroids. It is the only known family within the monotypic order Beroida and the class Nuda. They are distinguished from other comb jellies by the complete absence of tentacles, in both juvenile and adult stages. Species of the family Beroidae are found in all the world's oceans and seas and are free-swimmers that form part of the plankton.

== Anatomy ==
Some members of the diverse genus Beroe may occasionally attain a length of up to 30 centimetres (12 in), though most species and individuals are less than about 10 cm; Neis cordigera is among the largest species in the class, often exceeding 30 cm (12 in) in length. The body is melon or cone-shaped with a wide mouth and pharynx and a capacious gastrovascular cavity. Many meridional canals branch off this and form a network of diverticulae in the mesogloea. There are no tentacles but there are a row of branched papillae, forming a figure of eight around the aboral tip.

The sack-like body of the Beroe species may be cylindrical in cross section, or compressed to varying amounts according to species, while Neis is somewhat flattened and characterized by a pair of trailing gelatinous "wings" that extend beyond the aboral tip.

Like other comb jellies, the body wall of nudans consists of an outer epidermis and an inner gastrodermis, separated by a jelly-like mesoglea. The mesoglea has pigments that give many nudan species a slightly pink color; Neis cordigera may be yellowish or a deep orange-red.

=== Mouth opening ===
Some nudans have a very large oral cavity, allowing them to swallow prey whole. While swimming, and particularly while pursuing prey, they close their mouths like a zipper so that they maintain a streamlined profile. The mouth is zipped closed from each end, and the edges seal shut by forming temporary inter-cellular connections. When close to the prey, the lips contract and the mouth is opened rapidly, sucking in the prey. This action is reversible and the lips can be resealed. An alternative method of feeding involves the lips spreading over the prey and the sword-shaped macrocilia lining the lips chopping off chunks. The lips are sealed by the presence of adhesive strips of epithelial cells along their opposite edges. Not all species seem to have these strips which seem specifically adapted to those with wide mouths whereas species with small oral openings are able to control the opening of the aperture by more conventional means.

=== Macrocilia ===
Directly inside the mouth opening, in the lining of the gullet, can be found characteristic finger-like processes known as "macrocilia". These were first described by J.G.F. Will in 1844 and further investigated by George Adrian Horridge in 1965. He found they were complex structures composed of 2,000 to 3,000 filaments in a single, conical functional unit. Each macrocilium shows the typical eukaryote construction of nine external and two internal microtubules. The individual macrocilium is between 50 and 60 micrometres long and 6 to 10 micrometres thick, with the cilia bonded together in a hexagonal cross-sectional structure by permanent fibrils in three different planes. A system of tubules connects the basal bodies from which the macrocilia grow.

The macrocilia move in unison. They are angled towards the gullet and are stacked on top of each other like roof tiles. By this arrangement they effectively grip parts of the prey in synchronized waves like a conveyor belt, transporting it to the stomach, and the throat muscles promote this process. The three-toothed tip of the macrocilia is stiff enough for it to rip the outer wall of larger prey such as other ctenophores; at the same time, proteolytic enzymes penetrate into the resulting wounds, rapidly incapacitating the victim.

Macrocilia also function as teeth, and can be used in the same way as the tentacles of Tentaculata.

=== Channel system ===
As in other ctenophores, from the main stomach a network of channels branch through the mesogloea. Some of these have blind ends and others link up. They supply nutrients to the most active parts of the animal, the mouth, pharynx, combs of cilia and the sensory organs at the hind end of the body. Each comb plate has its own meridional canal situated directly beneath it and a ring of channels surround the mouth.

=== Sensory organs and combs ===
At the aboral end of the animal (the opposite end from the mouth) is a statocyst, a balance organ that helps it to orient itself. Papillae surround the statocyst. Their function is unclear, but they are probably also used for sensory perception. The eight combs of cilia extend part way along the body in ribs. The combs are used in locomotion, with the cilia beating in synchronised waves to propel the animal. It usually moves with the mouth end in front, but the direction of movement can be reversed. When not actively moving, a vertical position is maintained, normally with the mouth upwards.

== Diet ==
Nudans feed on free swimming animals with soft bodies, primarily on other ctenophores, many of them larger than they are themselves. They actively hunt for prey, which they usually devour whole. Some species use their macrocilia as teeth to remove smaller chunks from their prey.

== As invasive species ==
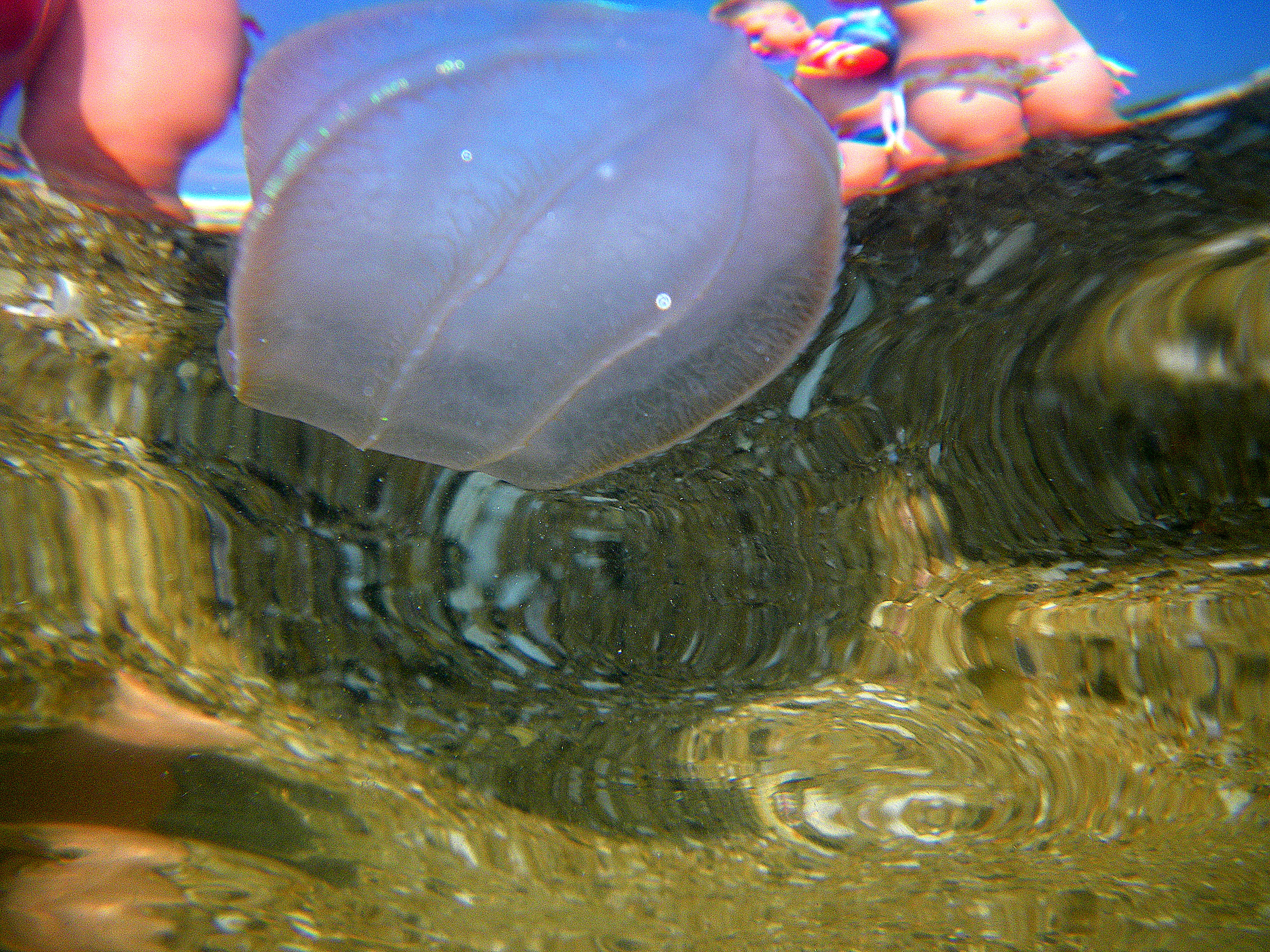
Beroe ovata on the Black Sea coast

In the late 1980s the ctenophore species Mnemiopsis leidyi was introduced into the Black Sea, probably through ballast water, which led to the collapse of the local anchovy population. In 1997 another ctenophore species arrived—Beroe ovata, a predator of Mnemiopsis leidyi. The Beroe population underwent an initial explosion, until the numbers of both ctenophores stabilized. Nevertheless, both Mnemiopsis leidyi and Beroe ovata remain today in the Black Sea. The same phenomenon is occurring at the beginning of the 21st century in the Caspian Sea.

== Reproduction ==
All species are hermaphrodites and reproduce sexually, having both female and male gonads. Although no detailed figures are available, it is assumed that self-fertilization is the exception among nudans. The fertilized eggs hatch into miniature versions of the adult animal, rather than distinct larval forms. They lack tentacles and are otherwise similar to the Cydippea larvae.

== Taxonomy and systematics ==
There are no known fossil nudans, so the phylogenetic evolution of the group by comparison with other modern ctenophores is not possible. In the traditional system, the Nuda form a class distinct from the Tentaculata, which all have at least rudimentary tentacles. This division, after provisional results of morphological and molecular studies, however, probably does not reflect the actual relationships within the ctenophores. The monophyly of Nuda is widely accepted, due to the complete lack of tentacles, and the presence of macrocilia as a common secondary feature, or synapomorphy.

There are approximately 25 species in the family Beroidae, grouped into two genera. The family and order were named in 1825 or 1829 by the German naturalist Johann Friedrich Eschscholtz.

- The genus Beroe includes nearly all the members of the class and is distributed worldwide. One of the best known species, which is widespread in the Northern Hemisphere, is Beroe gracilis. In Beroe species, the body is usually maintained in a vertical position with the mouth end orientated upwards. The vascular system is separated longitudinally into two separate halves.
- The genus Neis is monotypical, containing only one species, Neis cordigera (Lesson 1824), and is found only in the waters around Australia. The aboral end is extended into two large lobes and the vascular system is undivided.
