= Lesueuria vitrea =

Scientific classification
- Kingdom: Animalia
- Phylum: Ctenophora
- Class: Tentaculata
- Order: Lobata
- Family: Bolinopsidae
- Genus: Lesueuria
- Species: L. vitrea

Binomial name
- Lesueuria vitrea Milne-Edwards, 1841

Species of comb jelly

Lesueuria vitrea is a species of comb jelly in the family Bolinopsidae. It is the type species of the genus Lesueuria and is found in the Mediterranean Sea. Its type specimen was collected in the Bay of Nice.

== Taxonomy ==
Lesueuria vitrea was first described by French zoologist Henri Milne-Edwards in 1841, when it was designated as the type species of the newly established genus Lesueuria. Over the next century, several other zoologists collected or viewed the species and included it in their lists. Alessandro Spagnolini in 1870 believed the species may be what is now called Bolinopsis infundibulum, William M'Intosh claimed to have found it in Scotland in 1888, and Fanny Moser expanded the genus by adding L. hyboptera and L. tiedemanni in 1908. Ole Theodor Jensen Mortensen agreed with Spagnolini in 1912, theorizing that L. vitrea was either a rare deep sea species, a heteromorphic form of B. infundibulum, or specimens of B. infundibulum that lost most of their lobes through damage or mutilation. In 1957, Lesueuria vitrea was included in a species compendium, but with the note non revue depuis — "never seen again" since its first description. A series of dive explorations in 1957 in the Bay of Nice, where the species was originally reported, did not find any specimens; they did, however, find several of Bolinopsis hydatina in the range. The genus Lesueuria was assigned to the family Bolinopsidae in 1995.

Despite its status as the name-bearing type of the genus Lesueuria, Milne-Edwards did not submit any of the type material of the species for preservation or study. Because of the likelihood that it is in fact a mutilated member of the genus Bolinopsis, the name Lesueuria vitrea is considered uncertain, or a nomen dubium, by the World Register of Marine Species.

== Description ==
In Milne-Edwards' original description, he noted the species' four auricles which look like ribbons, and its simple oral lobes. He also described a sensory organ but was unable to identify its exact nature. He interpreted several fibers that radiated from the organ as nerve structures, but they were later determined to be unrelated muscle fibers.
