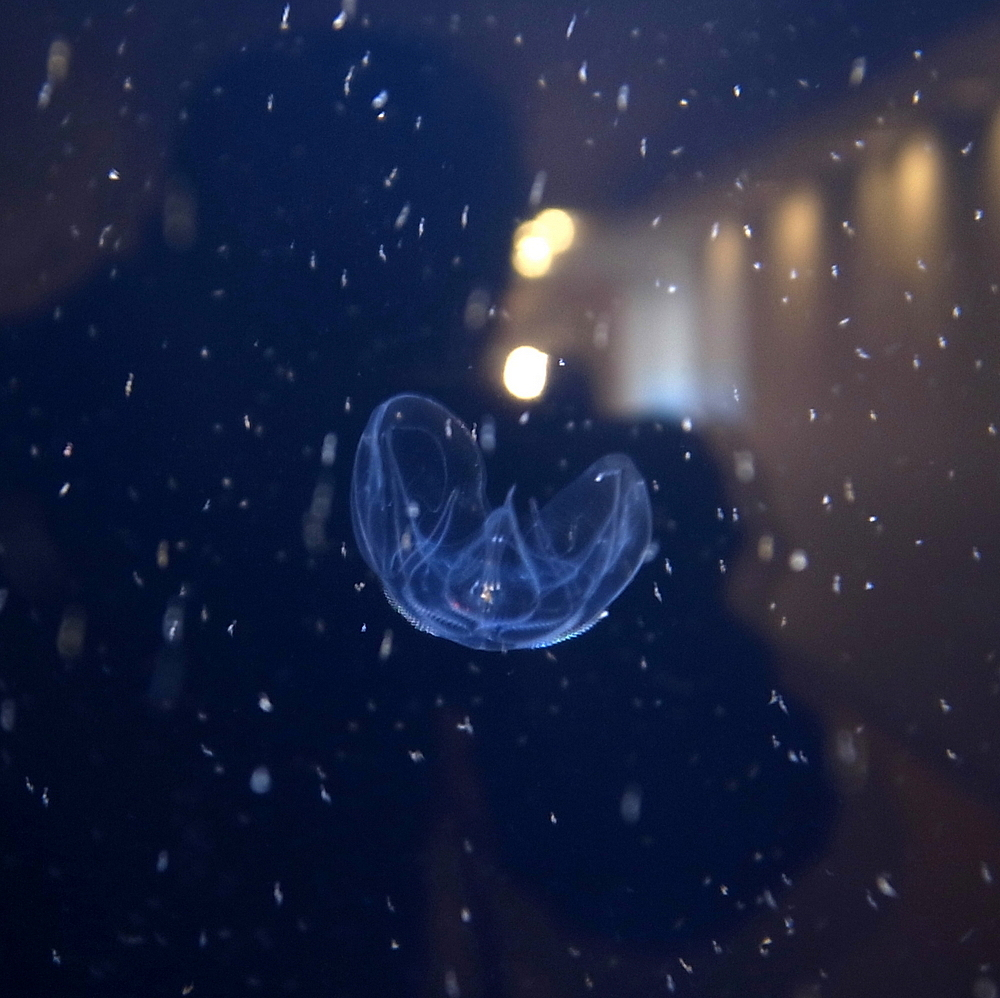
- Ocyropsis fusca

Scientific classification
- Kingdom: Animalia
- Phylum: Ctenophora
- Class: Tentaculata
- Order: Lobata
- Family: Ocyropsidae
- Genus: Ocyropsis; Mayer, 1912

Species
- See text.

= Ocyropsis =

Genus of comb jellies

Ocyropsis, a genus within the comb jelly phylum Ctenophora, belonging to the family of Ocyropsidae, are characterized by their prominent muscular lobes and four auricles. These pale, translucent organisms inhabit a wide range of oceanic environments, from warm tropical waters to the cold depths. Unlike many other ctenophores, which are relatively slow-moving, Ocyropsis species are agile predators, utilizing their powerful lobes for rapid propulsion. Additionally, they possess the ability to secrete bioluminescent mucus, a defense mechanism that can disorient and deter potential threats. To capture prey, Ocyropsis employ their muscular lobes to seize and manipulate food items, subsequently transferring them to their prehensile mouths for ingestion.

== Distribution ==
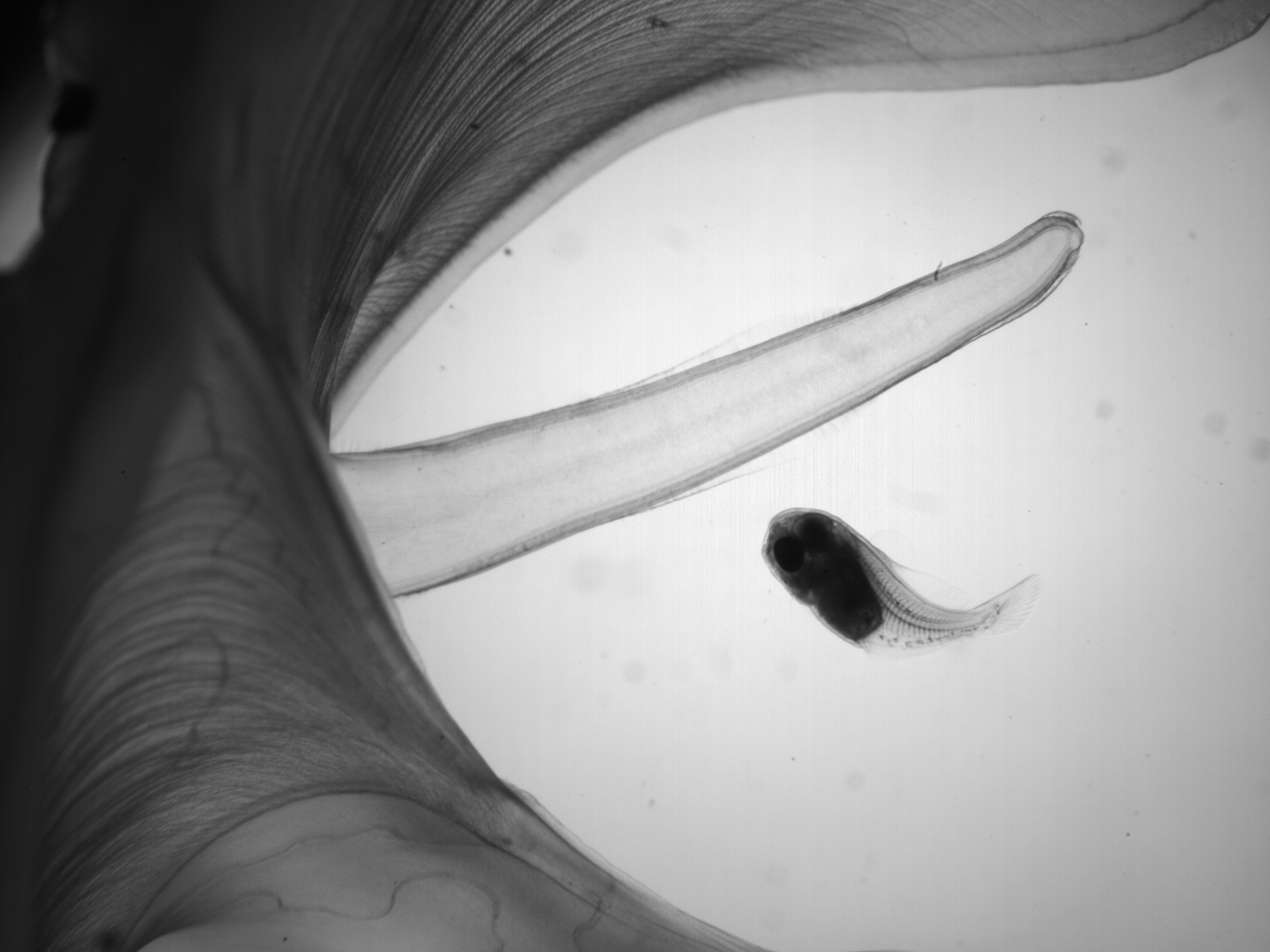
Unknown larval fish swimming around lobes and auricles of Ocyropsis

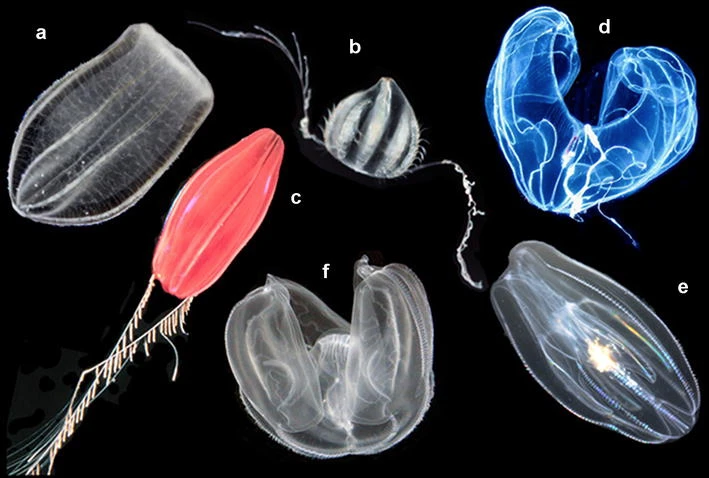
Pelagic ctenophores — (a) Beroe ovata, (b) unidentified cydippid, (c) "Tortugas Red" cydippid, (d) Bathocyroe fosteri, (e) Mnemiopsis leidyi, and (f) Ocyropsis sp.

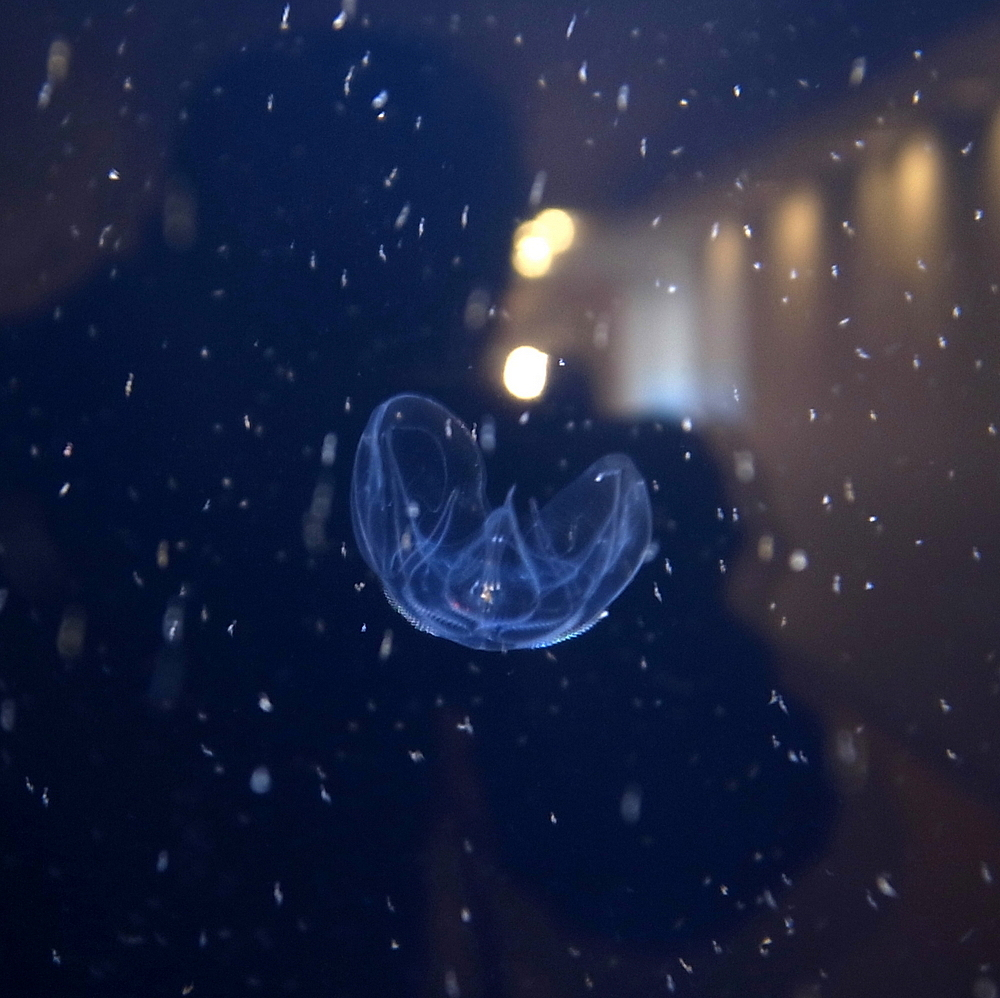
Ocyropsis fusca

=== Habitat ===
While the precise habitat preferences of ctenophores remain an area of ongoing research, Ocyropsis have been documented in diverse marine environments, ranging from warm tropical to colder temperate waters. Notably, they have been observed and photographed in the waters off South Africa, specifically from southern Mozambique to False Bay. Additionally, there have been reports of Ocyropsis near the Madeira Archipelago, with sightings as shallow as 2-6 meters depth near Porto Santo. This particular observation represents the northernmost record of Ocyropsis in the Atlantic Ocean. Although typically associated with subtropical epipelagic zones in the northeastern Pacific, Ocyropsis have also been reported in various other regions, including southern California, the Gulf of Mexico, the western Pacific, and the Indian Ocean.

=== Movement ===
While most ctenophores are slow swimmers relying on cilia-based propulsion, making them vulnerable to predators, Ocyropsis have evolved a unique adaptation for enhanced locomotion. In addition to their ciliary currents, they utilize their broad oral lobes, typically associated with feeding, for powerful rowing motions. This innovative propulsion mechanism allows Ocyropsis to achieve swimming speeds significantly exceeding those of other gelatinous organisms. Studies indicate that they are particularly adept at evading predators during nighttime hours. When startled, Ocyropsis initiate their jet propulsion and simultaneously release a luminous mucus, creating a disorienting spectacle that aids in their escape.

== Eating habits ==
Ocyropsis exhibit a distinctive foraging behavior, actively hunting horizontally through the water column. During pursuit, they generate a subtle wake resulting from the rapid compression and expansion of their bodies, coupled with the unique arrangement of their ctene rows. Prey capture involves the deft use of their muscular oral lobes, which grasp and manipulate food items before transferring them to the prehensile mouth for ingestion.

== Morphology ==
Ocyropsis exhibit a distinctive morphology, often described as resembling two hands clasped in prayer, with a pale, translucent coloration. Their body plan comprises two prominent lateral muscular lobes and four auricles of varying sizes. These lobes, which can extend up to approximately 5cm beyond the mouth, frequently exhibit pigmented spots in shades of brown or black. The sub-tentacular ctene rows are notably shorter than the sub-stomodeal rows, with the former typically possessing 25-27 ctene plates compared to the latter's 35-37 plates. (Ctene rows are characteristic structures in ctenophores, consisting of fused cilia used for locomotion.) As Ocyropsis individuals age, their tentacles tend to regress or disappear entirely.

== Species include ==
- Ocyropsis crystallina (Rang, 1826)
- Ocyropsis fusca (Rang, 1826)
- Ocyropsis maculata (Rang, 1826)
- Ocyropsis pteroessa (Bigelow, 1904)
- Ocyropsis vance (Gershwin, Zeidler & Davie, 2010)
