= Alcinoe (ctenophore) =

Scientific classification
- Domain: Eukaryota
- Kingdom: Animalia
- Phylum: Ctenophora
- Class: Tentaculata
- Order: Lobata
- Family: Ocyropsidae
- Genus: Alcinoe; Rang, 1828

Genus of comb jellies

Alcinoe is a genus of ctenophores belonging to the family Ocyropsidae.

Species:

- Alcinoe rosea Mertens, 1833
- Alcinoe vermicularis Rang, 1828
