= Bolinopsis vitrea =

Scientific classification
- Kingdom: Animalia
- Phylum: Ctenophora
- Class: Tentaculata
- Order: Lobata
- Family: Bolinopsidae
- Genus: Bolinopsis
- Species: B. vitrea

Binomial name
- Bolinopsis vitrea (Louis Agassiz, 1860)

Species of ctenophore

Bolinopsis vitrea, is a species of comb jelly in the family Bolinopsidae. It is found in the Atlantic Ocean and was first described by the American biologist Louis Agassiz in 1860.

== Distribution ==
In Florida waters, Bolinopsis vitrea is the most common ctenophore.
