= Velamen parallelum =

Scientific classification
- Kingdom: Animalia
- Phylum: Ctenophora
- Class: Tentaculata
- Order: Cestida
- Family: Cestidae
- Genus: Velamen; Krumbach, 1925
- Species: V. parallelum

Binomial name
- Velamen parallelum (Fol, 1869)

Synonyms
- Species synonymy: Folia parallela (Fol, 1869); Vexillum parallelum Fol, 1869; Genus synonymy: Folia Mayer, 1912; Vexillum Fol, 1869

Species of marine invertebrate

Velamen parallelum is the only species in the genus Velamen is a genus of ctenophores belonging to the family Cestidae. It contains a single species, Velamen parallelum. Compared to other ctenophores, it has not been studied very much. Because of this, a lot of what we know comes from observations of similar ribbon like species, along with a limited number of direct observations of Velamen parallelum itself.

== Morphology ==
One of the main things that makes Velamen parallelum stand out is its extremely flattened and elongated body shape. Unlike most comb jellies that are more rounded, this species has a thin, ribbon like body that almost looks like a strip of fabric drifting in the water. Its width is much greater than its thickness, which helps to increases its surface area. This shape likely helps with buoyancy and allows it to drift more easily with ocean currents instead of relying entirely on active swimming. Velamen parallelum produces green bioluminescence, which is usually triggered by physical disturbance, contact with predators, or strong water movement. This bioluminescence can be used to startle predators or to attract larger predators to attack whatever is threatening. The species is less than 20 cm long on average.

== Behavior and movement ==
Velamen parallelum uses a combination of two main movement types: Ctenary row propulsion which produces slow and steady movement. This type of movement is very energy efficient and used for long periods and is very common during feeding times. The second is whole body undulation which is a side to side wriggling motion that is used for escaping predators or quickly repositioning in the water. This species typically stays in a horizontal position, drifts sideways through the water column, and makes small adjustments to stay in areas with more prey.

== Feeding and diet ==
Instead of actively chasing prey, Velamen parallelum acts as both an ambush predator and a drift feeder. Its long body acts like a floating net using colloblasts along its surface help capture prey on contact. Although it is generally carnivorous, it mainly feeds on copepods, fish larvae, and occasionally other gelatinous plankton.

== Reproduction ==
Velamen parallelum is a hermaphroditic comb jelly. Being hermaphroditic is beneficial because individuals are often spread far apart, so encounters with others may be rare. Spawning is likely linked to environmental factors like temperature and food availability. its gametes are released into the water column and this increases genetic diversity and fertilization success because they are not often close to one another. Like other ctenophores it has a cydippid like larval stage and then the body gradually elongates into the ribbon form as it matures.

== Geography ==
Found mainly in the Atlantic Ocean and Mediterranean Sea. Found in sea currents like the Gulf Stream. These play a big role by transporting individuals over long distances. This can make sightings somewhat unpredictable.

== Research gaps ==
There is still a lot we do not know about Velamen parallelum. This includes its lifespan, detailed reproductive patterns, population distribution, predator prey relationships, and its role in marine ecosystems and carbon cycling. Studying it is difficult because it is fragile, so most data comes from field observations, plankton sampling, or deep sea imaging.
