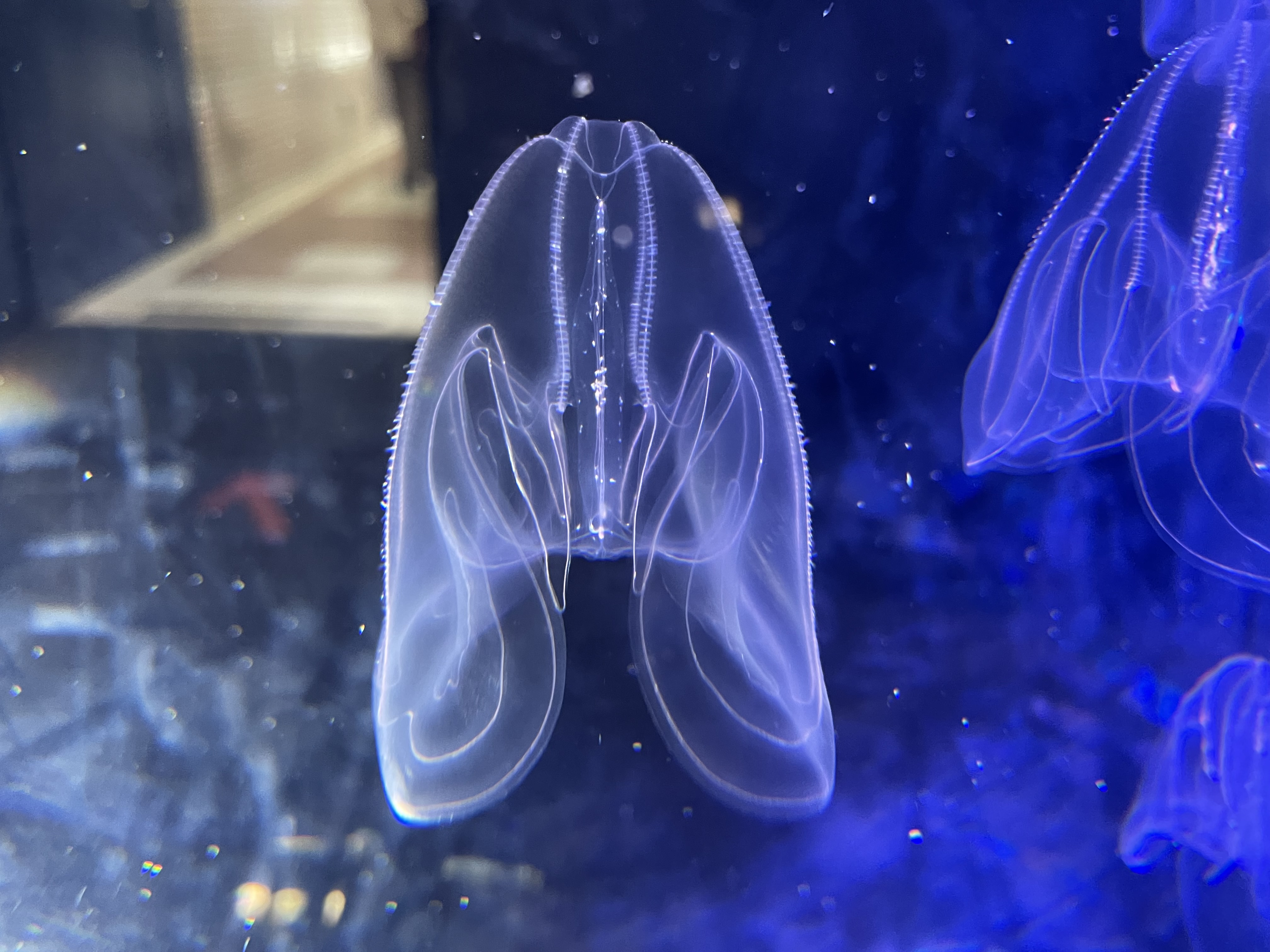

Scientific classification
- Kingdom: Animalia
- Phylum: Ctenophora
- Class: Tentaculata
- Order: Lobata
- Family: Bolinopsidae
- Genus: Bolinopsis
- Species: B. mikado

Binomial name
- Bolinopsis mikado Moser, 1907

= Bolinopsis mikado =

Species of comb jelly

Bolinopsis mikado, commonly referred to as the Mikado comb jelly, is a species of ctenophore in the family Bolinopsidae. It is most prevalent in Japan’s coastal seas, with their highest abundance typically recorded in mid-summer to mid-autumn months in Tokyo Bay. It is suggested that B. mikado has a significant predatory impact on the planktonic community during their period of abundance, and make up an integral part of the pelagic ecosystem throughout the water column.

== Movement ==
Most ctenophores, like Bolinopsis mikado, have apical organs, which are classified as the sensory organs that authorize locomotion. These organs are an assemblage of sensory cells and cilia, in which there are six distinct and diverse types: dome cilia, balancer cilia, ciliated grooves, bristles, bridge/fan cilia, and striated tract cilia. Although their bodies appear to have bioluminescence, this production of light comes from the beating of their cilia during movement. This is due to light diffraction, which produces the colorful rainbow visuals along the sides of their body.

== Life cycle and reproduction ==
This organism is considered a lobate ctenophore, but after they hatch, they enter a cydippid larval stage, and possess tentacles from approximate total length sizes of 1mm-15mm. Typically, when B. mikado reaches lengths greater than 15 mm, they are defined as “post-larvae”, and are considered lobate, having since shed their temporary tentacles. At this point in their life cycle, they have a greater resemblance to the adult form rather than the larval form. They reach their full adult form and begin reproducing at around 20 mm in total length, which occurs approximately 30 days after hatching in temperatures of ~17 degrees celsius. However, in warmer temperatures of ~24 degrees celsius, they reach adulthood in as little as 13 days.

The life-span of B. mikado varies seasonally, and it has been reported that they have an average survival rate of one month during the summer season, and around three months during the winter season in Tokyo Bay, Japan. The likely cause is correlated with sea surface temperatures, which produce a higher or lower maturation rate based on the temperature at the time, as stated above.

Spawning B. mikado are found through all the months of the year, and it is suggested that they reproduce at regular, fast rates; perhaps daily. Egg production rate is more closely linked to body size rather than temperature of the water. Although it takes a greater time for them to reach maturation in the winter, it does not affect their egg production rate once they are mature adult ctenophores.

== Feeding ==
In comparison to other ctenophores in Tokyo Bay with higher metabolic needs, B. mikado has a low minimum prey requirement; therefore, they can be found in clearer, less nutrient rich waters. Due to this, it can be inferred that B. mikado itself is a primary nutrient source for other organisms with its high population abundance and minimum prey density demands. In studying declines in surrounding zooplankton in relation to the higher seasonal abundance of B. mikado, it is deduced that Oithona davisae, Oikopleura dioica, and Acartia omorii are among the primary choice of prey. From these predatory-prey interactions, we are able to deduce that despite their low-minimum prey requirement relative to other species, they still have a heavy influence to their surrounding environment, particularly in these phytoplankton populations.
