= Colloblast =

Type of cell unique to comb jellies

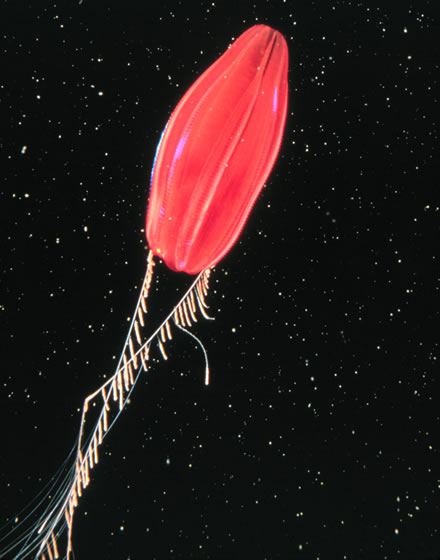
A bioluminescent Ctenophore.

Colloblasts are unique, multicellular structures found in tentaculate ctenophores, a synapomorphy of that group. They are widespread in the tentacles of these animals and are used to capture prey. Colloblasts consist of a collocyte containing a coiled spiral filament, internal granules and other organelles.

Like the cnidocytes of cnidarians, colloblasts are discharged from the animals’ tentacles, and are used to capture prey. However, unlike cnidocytes, which are venomous cells, colloblasts contain adhesives which stick to, rather than sting the prey.

== Form and Function ==
A diagram showing the organelles and feature of a typical colloblast.

Colloblasts were first described in 1844.

Colloblasts are mainly composed of two cell types, the stalk itself, which is divided into the collosphere and collopod, as well as numerous cap cells that deposit external secretion granules on the surface of the collosphere. These granules, also called eosinophilic granules, are thought to be the source of adhesion. A spiral filament is wrapped around the collopod, which is attached to the tentilla via a negatively charged root.

The colloblast is typically concealed by the pleated surface of the tentillum, and only visible when it is extended. When disturbed, the plasma bridge connecting the spiral filament to the collopod breaks, releasing the colloblast from the tentilla of the ctenophore. On contact with prey, external secretion granules on the apical side of the collosphere rupture, releasing an adhesive substance. The spiral filament remains attached to the tentillum, keeping the prey immobilized until it is consumed.

== Variation and Occurrence ==
A diagram showing the five types of colloblasts, as observed in the tentaculate ctenophore Minictena luteola.

Colloblasts are found in all ctenophores except those of the order Beroida, which lack tentacles, and the genus Haeckelia, which uses cnidocytes from cnidarian prey.

The biggest source of variation among Ctenophore groups is the shape of the collosphere. The basal colloblast has a spherical collosphere, as depicted above, though the orders Cestida, Cydippida, and Lobata have an elongated collosphere and an absent collopod, with the spiral filament attached directly to the collosphere. In these species, the spiral filament is also often reduced or absent.

The basal colloblast with a spherical collosphere can be further subdivided into five different types, based on the size and shape of their spiral filament and radii. Types I, II, and III, found on the proximal side of a tentillum, are smaller and have fewer coils in their spiral filament, while type IV and V are found on the distal side, have more complex spiral filaments, and lack external secretion granules. The morphology of this polymorphism is unknown.
