= Ocyropsidae =

Scientific classification
- Kingdom: Animalia
- Phylum: Ctenophora
- Class: Tentaculata
- Order: Lobata
- Family: Ocyropsidae; Harbison & Madin, 1982

Genera
- See text

Family of comb jellies

Ocyropsidae is a family of ctenophores.

== Taxonomy ==
The family Ocyropsidae contains the following species:

- Genus Alcinoe
  - Alcinoe rosea Mertens, 1833
  - Alcinoe vermicularis Rang 1828
- Genus Ocyropsis
  - Ocyropsis crystallina (Rang, 1826)
  - Ocyropsis fusca (Rang, 1826)
  - Ocyropsis maculata (Rang, 1826)
  - Ocyropsis pteroessa Bigelow, 1904
  - Ocyropsis vance Gershwin, Zeidler & Davie, 2010
