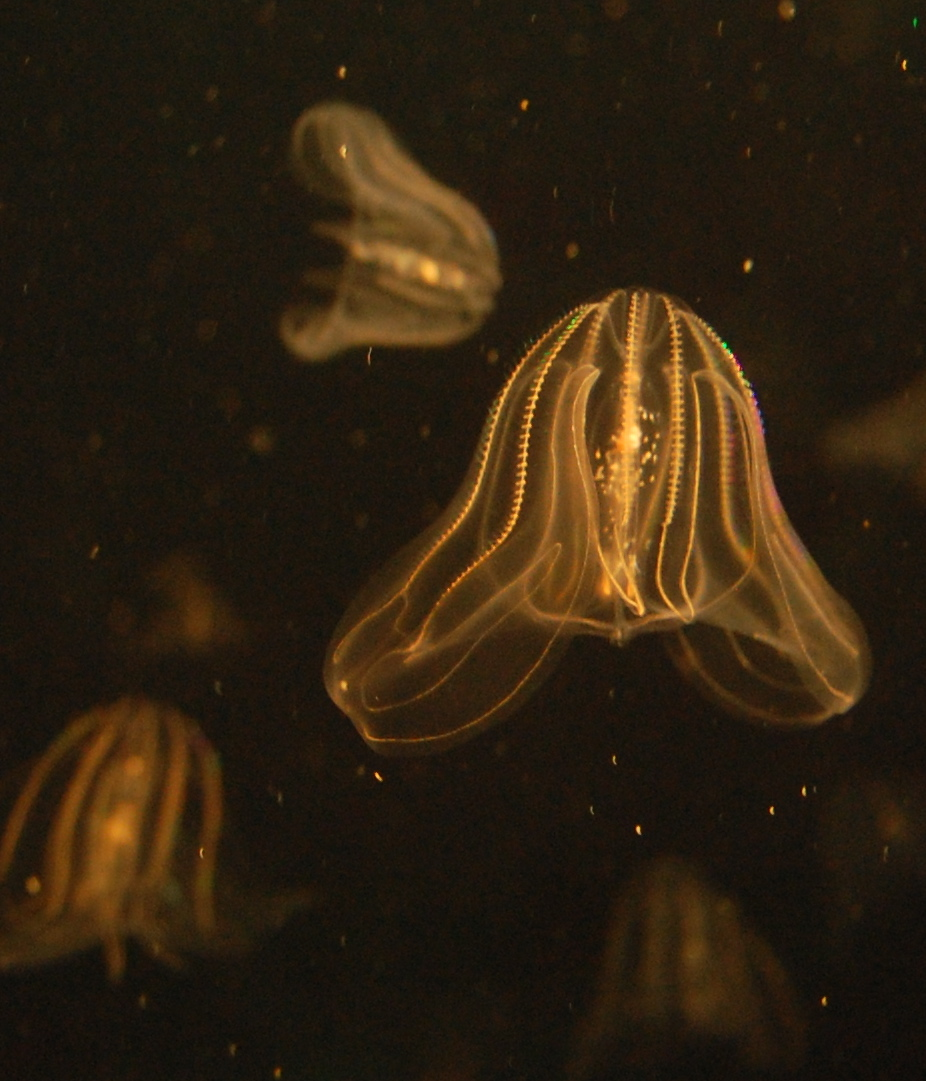
- M. leidyi at the New England Aquarium

Scientific classification
- Kingdom: Animalia
- Phylum: Ctenophora
- Class: Tentaculata
- Order: Lobata
- Family: Bolinopsidae; Bigelow, 1912

Genera
- See text

= Bolinopsidae =

Family of comb jellies

Bolinopsidae is a family of ctenophores.

== Taxonomy ==
The family contains three genera with the following species:

- Genus Bolinopsis
  - Bolinopsis ashleyi Gershwin, Zeidler & Davie, 2010
  - Bolinopsis chuni (von Lendenfeld, 1884)
  - Bolinopsis elegans (Mertens, 1833)
  - Bolinopsis indosinensis Dawydoff, 1946
  - Bolinopsis infundibulum (Müller, 1776)
  - Bolinopsis microptera (Agassiz, 1865)
  - Bolinopsis mikado Moser, 1908
  - Bolinopsis ovalis (Bigelow, 1904)
  - Bolinopsis rubripunctata Tokioka 1964
  - Bolinopsis vitrea (Agassiz, 1860)
- Genus Lesueuria
  - Lesueuria hyboptera Agassiz, 1865
  - Lesueuria pinnata Ralph and Kaberry, 1950
  - Lesueuria tiedemanni (Eschscholtz, 1829)
  - Lesueuria vitrea Milne Edwards, 1841
- Genus Mnemiopsis
  - Mnemiopsis leidyi A. Agassiz, 1865
