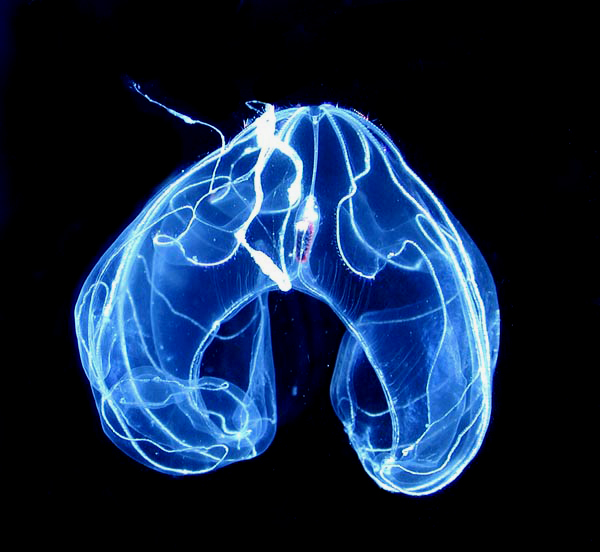
- Bathocyroe fosteri

Scientific classification
- Kingdom: Animalia
- Phylum: Ctenophora
- Class: Tentaculata
- Order: Lobata
- Family: Bathocyroidae; Harbison & Madin, 1982
- Genus: Bathocyroe; Madin & Harbison, 1978

Species
- Bathocyroe fosteri Madin & Harbison, 1978; Bathocyroe longigula Horita, Akiyama & Kubota, 2011; Bathocyroe paragaster (Ralph & Kaberry, 1950)

= Bathocyroe =

Genus of comb jellies

Bathocyroe is a genus of ctenophores, the only genus in the family Bathocyroidae.
