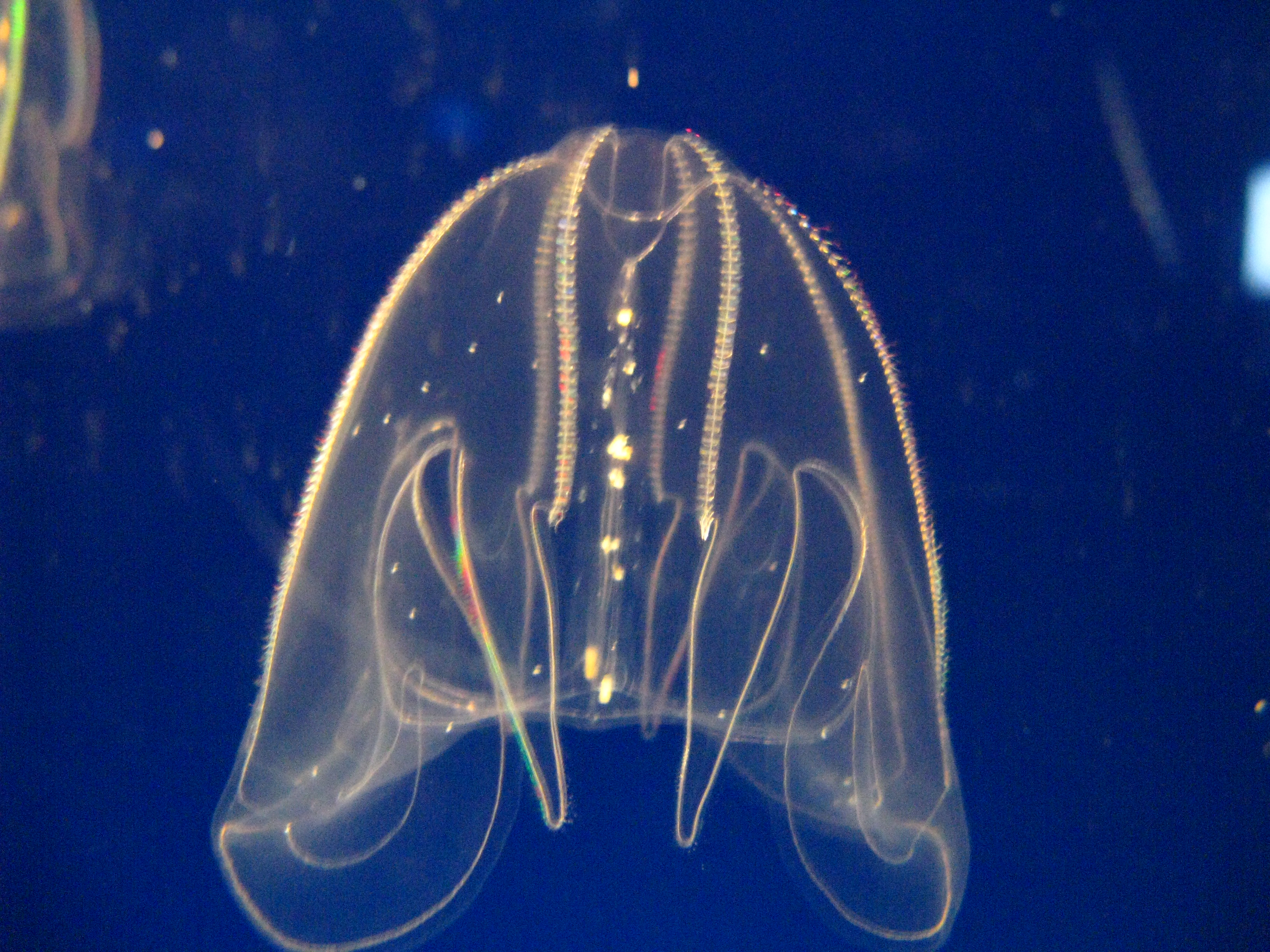
- Bolinopsis mikado

Scientific classification
- Kingdom: Animalia
- Phylum: Ctenophora
- Class: Tentaculata
- Order: Lobata
- Family: Bolinopsidae
- Genus: Bolinopsis; Agassiz, 1860

Synonyms
- Anais Lesson, 1843; Bolina Mertens, 1833

= Bolinopsis =

Genus of comb jellies

Bolinopsis is a genus of ctenophores belonging to the family Bolinopsidae.

The genus has cosmopolitan distribution.

Species:

- Bolinopsis ashleyi Gershwin, Zeidler & Davie, 2010
- Bolinopsis chuni (von Lendenfeld, 1884)
- Bolinopsis elegans (Mertens, 1833)
- Bolinopsis indosinensis Dawydoff, 1946
- Bolinopsis infundibulum (O.F.Müller, 1776)
- Bolinopsis microptera (A.Agassiz, 1865)
- Bolinopsis mikado (Moser, 1907)
- Bolinopsis ovalis (Bigelow, 1904)
- Bolinopsis rubripunctata Tokioka, 1964
- Bolinopsis vitrea (L.Agassiz, 1860)
