= Cryptolobata =

Scientific classification
- Kingdom: Animalia
- Phylum: Ctenophora
- Class: Tentaculata
- Order: Cryptolobiferida
- Family: Cryptolobatidae
- Genus: Cryptolobata; Moser, 1909
- Species: C. primitiva

Binomial name
- Cryptolobata primitiva Moser, 1909

Marine species of ctenophores

Cryptolobata primitiva is a marine species of ctenophores. It is the only species in the monotypic genus Cyptolobata. The genus and species were first described by Fanny Moser in 1909.

== Distribution ==
The species occurs in Indonesia.
