= Lesueuria =

Lesueuria may refer to:

- Lesueuria (ctenophore), a genus of ctenophores in the family Bolinopsidae
- Lesueuria (alga), a genus of algae in the family Mastophoraceae
- Lesueuria, a genus of fishes in the family Gobiidae, synonym of Lesueurigobius
