= Lobocrypta =

Scientific classification
- Kingdom: Animalia
- Phylum: Ctenophora
- Class: Tentaculata
- Order: Cryptolobiferida
- Family: Cryptolobatidae
- Genus: Lobocrypta; Dawydoff, 1946
- Species: L. annamita

Binomial name
- Lobocrypta annamita Dawydoff, 1946

Genus of comb jellies

Lobocrypta is a monotypic genus of ctenophores belonging to the family Cryptolobatidae. The only species is Lobocrypta annamita.
