= Deiopea kaloktenota =

Scientific classification
- Domain: Eukaryota
- Kingdom: Animalia
- Phylum: Ctenophora
- Class: Tentaculata
- Order: Lobata
- Family: Eurhamphaeidae
- Genus: Deiopea; Chun, 1879
- Species: D. kaloktenota

Binomial name
- Deiopea kaloktenota Chun, 1879

Genus of comb jellies

Deiopea kaloktenota is a species of ctenophore in the family Eurhamphaeidae. It is the only species in the monotypic genus Deiopea.
