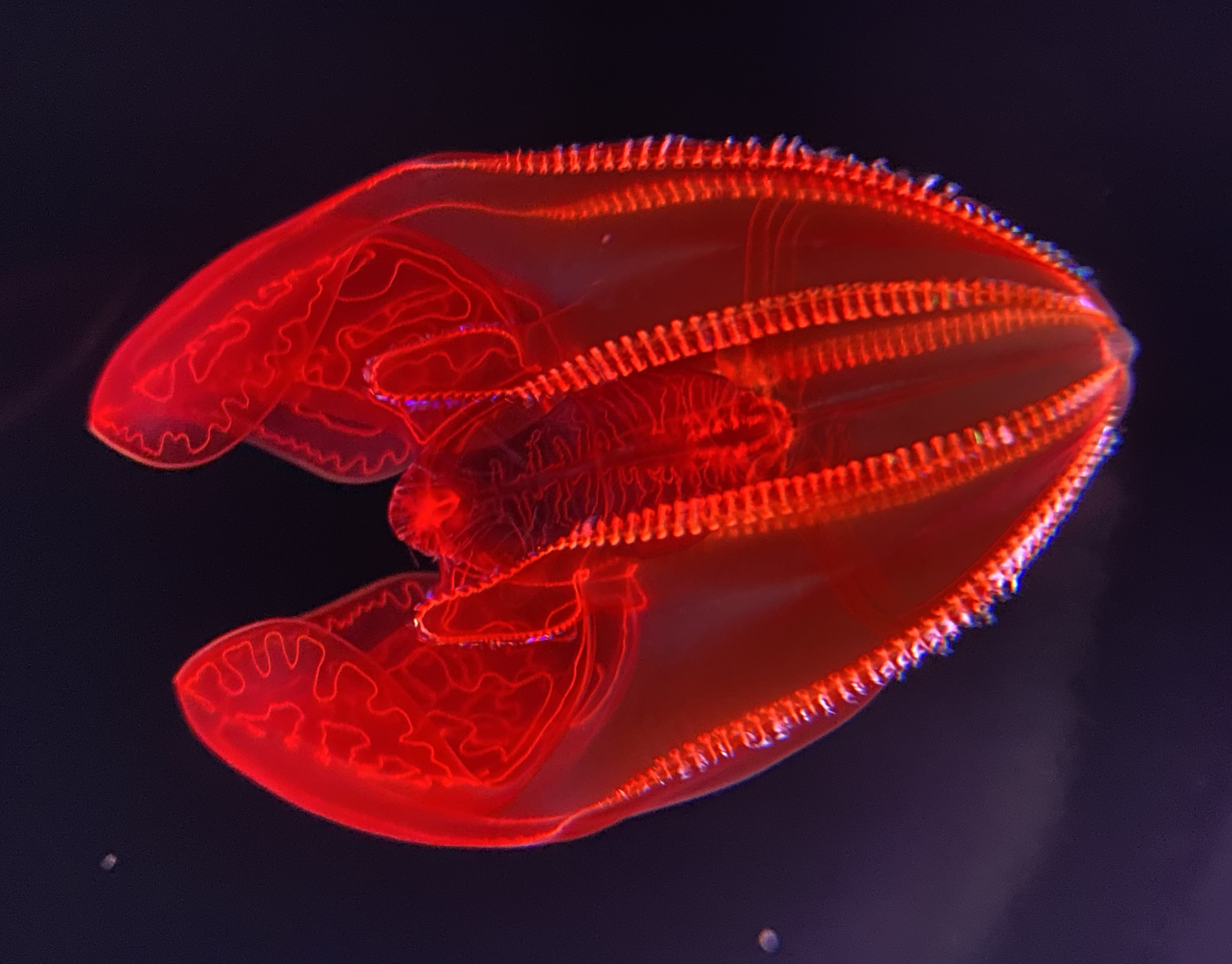
- Lampocteis cruentiventer at the Monterey Bay Aquarium

Scientific classification
- Kingdom: Animalia
- Phylum: Ctenophora
- Class: Tentaculata
- Order: Lobata
- Family: Lampoctenidae; Harbison, Matsumoto and Robison, 2001
- Genus: Lampocteis; Harbison, Matsumoto and Robison, 2001
- Species: L. cruentiventer

Binomial name
- Lampocteis cruentiventer Harbison, Matsumoto and Robison, 2001

= Lampocteis =

Genus of comb jellies

Lampocteis is a monotypic genus of comb jellies, the only genus in family Lampoctenidae. The sole species in this new genus is Lampocteis cruentiventer, the bloodybelly comb jelly. This ctenophore was first collected in the Pacific Ocean off the coast of San Diego, California, in 1979. It was described in 2001. The generic name was formed from the Ancient Greek lampós ("bright, shining, brilliant") and kteís ("comb"), referring to the iridescence of its "combs"; the specific epithet was formed from the Latin cruentus ("blood-red") and venter ("belly"). Two morphological differences separating it from previously known comb jellies warranted the naming of a new family for this animal. These jellies are typically found at a depth of 250–1,500 meters deep in the North Pacific Ocean.

== Description ==
Bloodybelly comb jelly (Lampocteis cruentiventer) swimming

This ctenophore differs from all previously described lobate ctenophores in two major ways: (1) all of the meridional canals have blind aboral endings, and (2) the body is penetrated by a deep notch located between the adjacent subtentacular comb rows at the level of the infundibulum. This mesopelagic jelly ranges in color from deep red, purple, or black to pale purple. The deep color of its belly may mask the animal's bioluminescence to hide it from potential predators. Its "combs," rows of cilia on its body, have a sparkling iridescence. Lampocteis need to be able to conceal their stomach in order to prevent their prey from lighting them up from the inside, effectively revealing its location. Specimens examined have ranged between 1.5 and 16 centimeters in length and 1.2 to 10 centimeters in width. Like other comb jellies, they use their hair-like cilia to navigate through the water.
