= Girdle of Venus =

Girdle of Venus may refer to:

- Girdle of Aphrodite, a magical accessory of Aphrodite/Venus
- The belt of Venus, an atmospheric phenomenon
- An alternative name for the chastity belt
- The girdle of Venus, a minor line in palmistry
- Venus girdle, Cestum veneris, a species of comb jelly
