= Lobatolampea =

Scientific classification
- Kingdom: Animalia
- Phylum: Ctenophora
- Class: Tentaculata
- Order: Lobata
- Family: Lobatolampeidae; Horita, 2000
- Genus: Lobatolampea; Horita, 2000
- Species: L. tetragona

Binomial name
- Lobatolampea tetragona Horita, 2000

Family of ctenophores

Lobatolampeidae is a family of ctenophores belonging to the order Lobata. The family consists of only one genus Lobatolampea and one species Lobatolampea tetragona.
