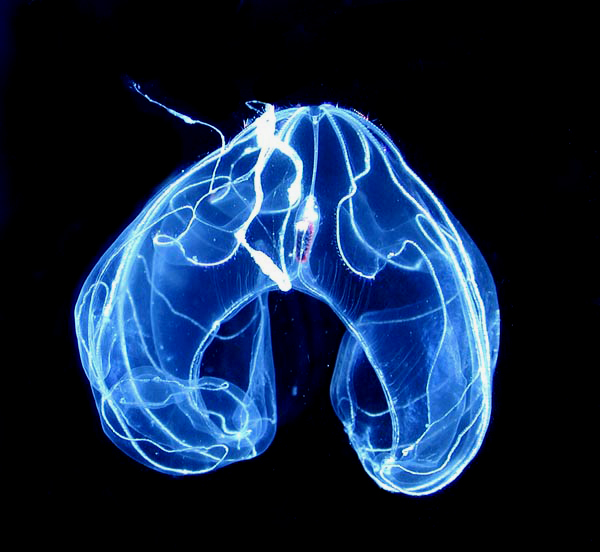

Scientific classification
- Domain: Eukaryota
- Kingdom: Animalia
- Phylum: Ctenophora
- Class: Tentaculata
- Order: Lobata
- Family: Bathocyroidae
- Genus: Bathocyroe
- Species: B. fosteri

Binomial name
- Bathocyroe fosteri L.P. Madin and G.R. Harbison, 1978

= Bathocyroe fosteri =

Species of comb jelly

Bathocyroe fosteri is a species of lobate ctenophore found at intermediate depths in all the world's oceans. The species is very common and abundant near the Mid-Atlantic Ridge. It is bioluminescent, and is typically observed hanging motionlessly in an upright or inverted posture although it can flap its oral lobes to swim. This deep-sea comb jelly is named for Alvin (DSV-2) pilot Dudley Foster, who collected the first specimens.

== Description ==
Bathocyroe fosteri is mostly transparent with red pigmented inner gut walls. It has short comb rows and measures 2–4 cm across the oral lobes. These oral lobes are used to contain prey until they are drawn into the gut with its tentacles.
