= Lesueuria (ctenophore) =

Scientific classification
- Kingdom: Animalia
- Phylum: Ctenophora
- Class: Tentaculata
- Order: Lobata
- Family: Bolinopsidae
- Genus: Lesueuria; Milne Edwards, 1841

Genus of comb jellies

Lesueuria is a genus of ctenophores belonging to the family Bolinopsidae.

Species:

- Lesueuria hyboptera Agassiz, 1865
- Lesueuria pinnata Ralph & Kaberry, 1950
- Lesueuria tiedemanni (Eschscholtz, 1829)
- Lesueuria vitrea Milne Edwards, 1841
