= Deiopea =

Deiopea may refer to:

- Deiopea (ctenophore), a genus of ctenophores (comb jellies) in the family Eurhamphaeidae

== Greek mythology ==
- Deiopea (mythology), two characters in Greek mythology:

- Deiopea, one of the Nereids
- Deiopea, a nymph that Juno promised in marriage to Aeolus if he would unleash his winds against Aeneas
