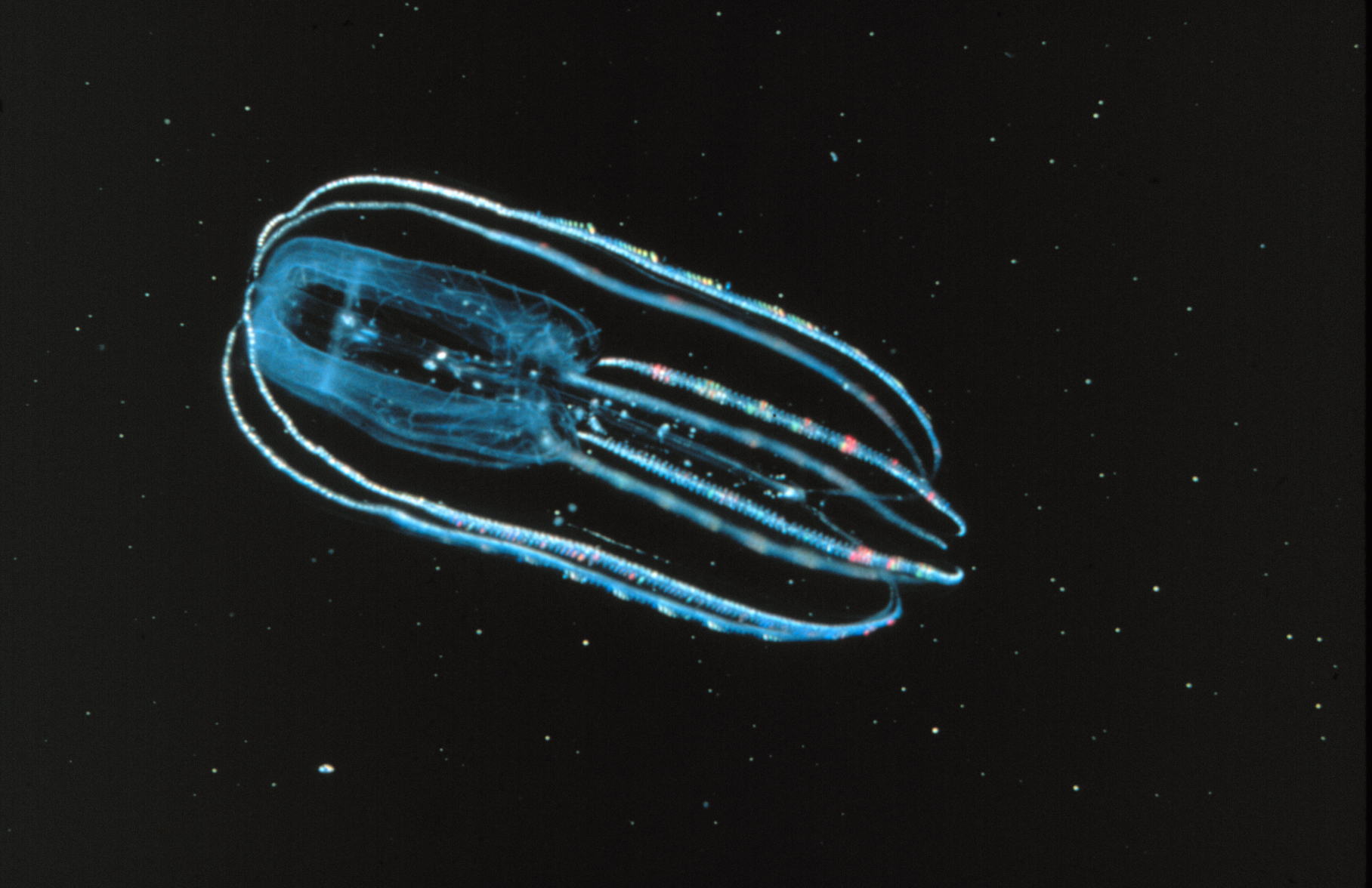

Scientific classification
- Kingdom: Animalia
- Phylum: Ctenophora
- Class: Tentaculata
- Order: Lobata
- Family: Bolinopsidae
- Genus: Bolinopsis
- Species: B. infundibulum

Binomial name
- Bolinopsis infundibulum (O.F. Müller, 1776)

Synonyms
- Bolinopsis alata Agassiz, 1860; Bolinopsis septentrionalis Mertens, 1833

= Bolinopsis infundibulum =

Species of comb jelly

Bolinopsis infundibulum, commonly known as the common northern comb jelly, is a species of comb jelly in the family Bolinopsidae. It is found in the northern Atlantic Ocean and was first described by the Danish naturalist Otto Friedrich Müller in 1776.

== Description ==
Bolinopsis infundibulum is an oblong comb jelly growing to a maximum length of about 15 cm (6 in). The thin gelatinous body wall is transparent, or occasionally milky white. There are two short tentacles with fringed edges. The mouth is at one end of the body and has two large lobes beside it, used to funnel food towards it. Between the lobes are four auricles, gelatinous projections fringed with cilia, that produce feeding currents that help draw in the microscopic prey. The mouth is surrounded by a ring of tentilla (little tentacles). The other end of the body is bluntly pointed. Locomotion is provided by the four long longitudinal rows and four short rows of cilia. These cilia are arranged on transverse plates and beat in synchrony, giving the animal its iridescent appearance. The plates to which the cilia are attached are bioluminescent. Ctenophores differ from cnidarians due to the fact that ctenophores lack stinging cells. Instead, they use colloblasts to capture their prey.

== Distribution ==
Bolinopsis infundibulum occurs in the northern Atlantic, its range extending from the Arctic to the Mediterranean Sea in the east and the Gulf of Maine in the west. It also occurs in the Pacific Northwest from the Bering Sea to California. It is found to a depth of about 1,000 m (3,281 ft), with the largest individuals found at greater depths.

== Ecology ==
Bolinopsis infundibulum is a predator and sometimes occurs in swarms. The food is drawn towards the mouth by the feeding current created by movement of cilia. Weakly swimming prey such as fish eggs and fry, copepod larvae, gastropod veligers, rotifers and other tiny zooplankton are then trapped by the tentilla and ingested.

Bolinopsis infundibulum is an important part of the food chain, occurring in large numbers off the coast of Norway from April to August, and in Scotland from April to June. As many as 250 individuals per square metre have been recorded in mid-May, followed by a rapid decline. This sudden population collapse is believed to be caused by predation by another species of comb jelly, Beroe cucumis. Larger individuals of B. infundibulum have been reported from deeper waters, preying on copepods, later in the year.
