= Eurhamphaeidae =

Scientific classification
- Kingdom: Animalia
- Phylum: Ctenophora
- Class: Tentaculata
- Order: Lobata
- Family: Eurhamphaeidae; L. Agassiz, 1860

Genera
- See text

Family of comb jellies

Eurhamphaeidae is a family of ctenophores.

== Taxonomy ==
The family Eurhamphaeidae contains the following species:

- Genus Deiopea
  - Deiopea kaloktenota Chun, 1879
- Genus Eurhamphaea
  - Eurhamphaea vexilligera Gegenbaur, 1856
- Genus Kiyohimea
  - Kiyohimea aurita Komai and Tokioka, 1940
  - Kiyohimea usagi Matsumoto and Robison, 1992
- Genus Verminculus
