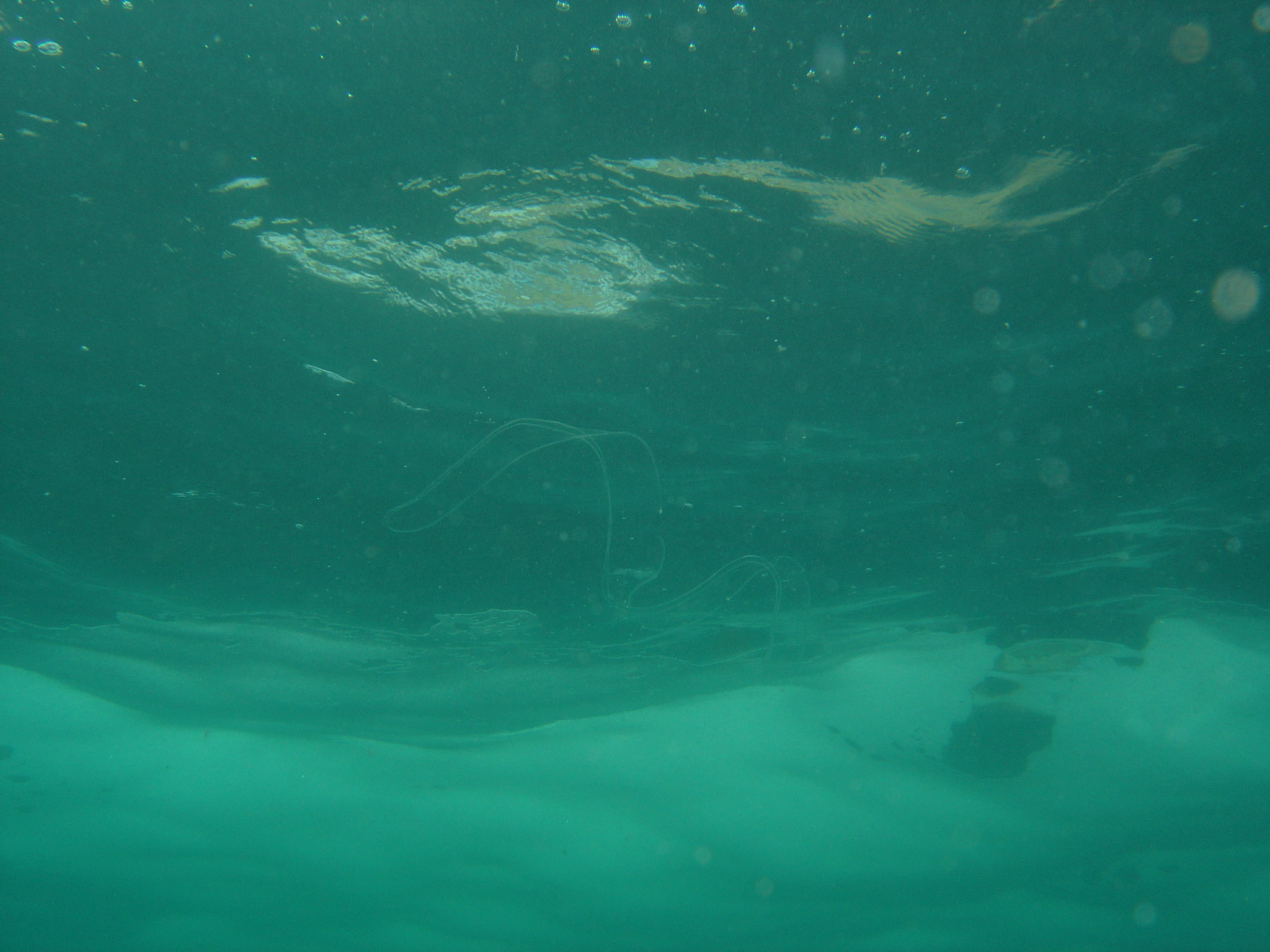
- Ctenophore Venus girdle at the dive site Rocky Bay on the east side of False Bay

Scientific classification
- Kingdom: Animalia
- Phylum: Ctenophora
- Class: Tentaculata
- Order: Cestida; Gegenbaur, 1856
- Family: Cestidae; Gegenbaur, 1856

Genera
- See text

= Cestidae =

Family of comb jellies

Cestidae is a family of comb jellies. It is the only family in the monotypic order Cestida. Unlike other comb jellies, the body of cestids is greatly flattened, and drawn out into a long ribbon-like shape. The two tentacles are greatly shortened, and two of the four ciliated comb rows are reduced. The unusual body form allows the animals to swim by means of muscular undulation, as well as by using their cilia. The largest species, belonging to the genus Cestum, can reach 1.5 metres (4.9 ft) in length.

== Classification ==
The order Cestida has one family, Cestidae, which contains two genera: Cestum and Velamen. Each genus contains one species.

- Cestum veneris Lesueur, 1813
- Velamen parallelum (Fol, 1869)
