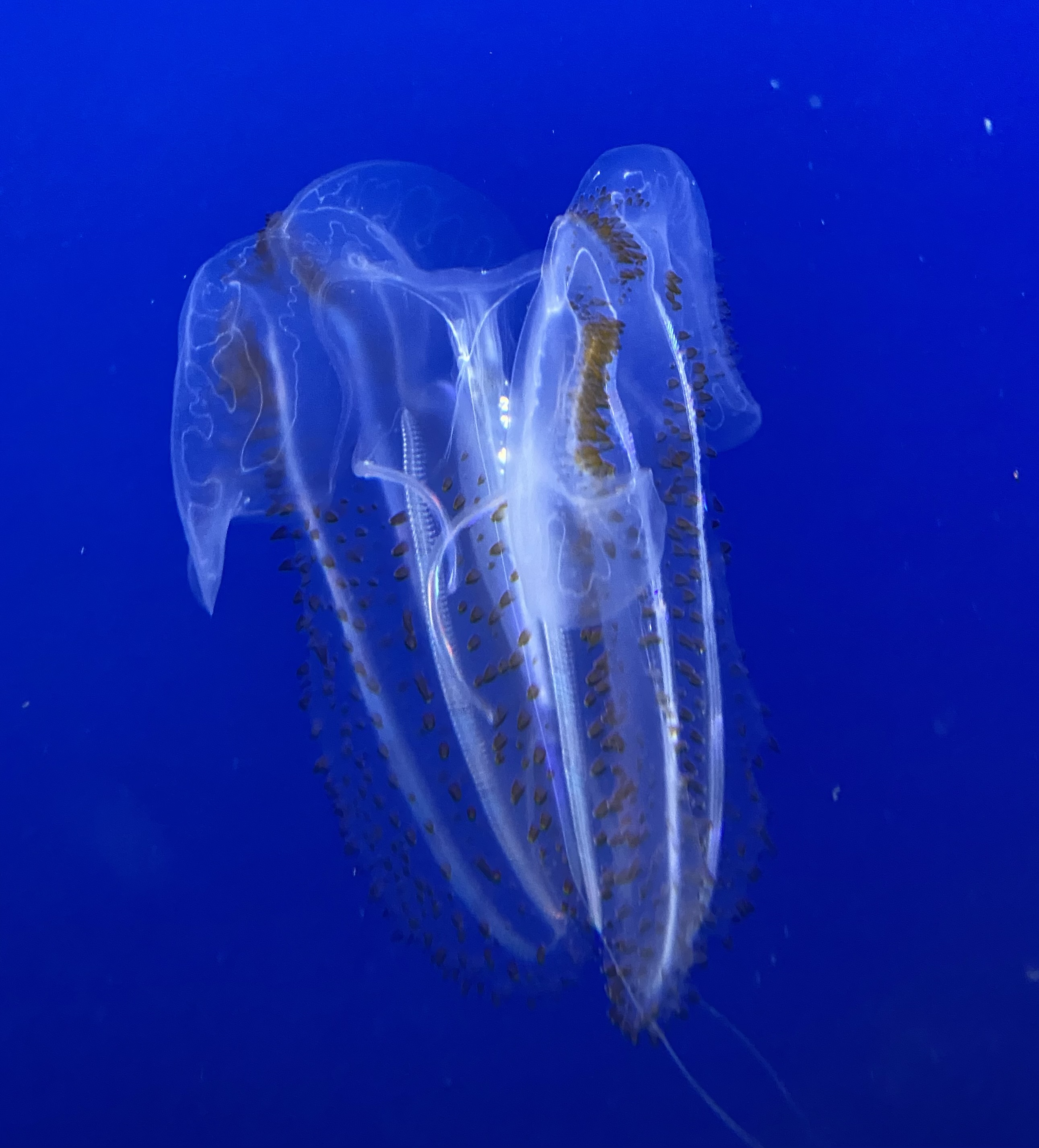
- Leucothea pulchra at the Monterey Bay Aquarium

Scientific classification
- Kingdom: Animalia
- Phylum: Ctenophora
- Class: Tentaculata
- Order: Lobata
- Family: Leucotheidae; Krumbach, 1925
- Genus: Leucothea; Mertens, 1833

Species
- See text

Synonyms
- Eucharis Eschscholtz, 1825 (Preocc.); Alcinoe Della Chiaje, 1841 (Preocc.); Chiaja Lesson, 1843

= Leucothea (ctenophore) =

Genus of ctenophores

Video of Leucothea pulchra moving through the water. Propulsion by use of ctene rows is visible.

Leucothea is a genus of ctenophores in the monotypic family Leucotheidae.

== Species ==
The genus contains the following species:

- Leucothea filmersankeyi Gershwin, Zeidler & Davie, 2010
- Leucothea grandiformis Agassiz & Mayer, 1899
- Leucothea harmata
- Leucothea japonica Komai, 1918
- Leucothea multicornis (Quoy & Gaimard, 1824)
- Leucothea ochracea Mayer, 1912
- Leucothea pulchra Matsumoto, 1988

== Description ==
Like other species in the order Lobata, Leucothea species have a distinct, compressed body shape with two prominent lobes on either side, these being their most distinguishing features. In addition to these two large lobes, they have 4 lengthy, coiled auricles lined with cilia extending around the mouth which assist the animal in guiding prey into the mouth; these auricles will uncoil at points and wave, potentially working to lure prey. There are two tentacles on either side originating around the oral pole Leucothea can be identified by their oblong bodies which have fairly long lobes, taking up almost half of their length with papillae across the body and lobes. They are around 13-20cm, completely transparent, but bioluminescent and have gelatinous spikes that are thought to serve a sensory purpose as they are found to point towards stimuli. Out of their eight ctene rows, four are sub-stomodaeal and stop towards the aboral pole while the others are sub-tentacular and extend to the auricles.

They are easily mistaken for Bolinopsis sp.. Bolinopsis' lobes are attached at the end of their bodies, making them appear very similar to Leucothea – the main difference in the two when trying to identify being the sensory spikes possessed by the latter. Leucothea is thought to have ties to Bolinopsis through similar ancestors which make them very difficult to distinguish at times, especially during Leucothea's 'Bolinopsis phase' in growth when it has not yet grown its surface papillae and the two can hardly be told apart.

== Ecology ==
Leucothea are able to reproduce through self-fertilization and will release hundreds of offspring at a time. Development of these organisms varies by species – for example, through its larval life phase, Leucothea multicornis (of the Mediterranean) passes through a Cydippe-like stage, then a medusiform stage, and then onto the Bolinopsis stage before reaching its Leucothea stage in contrast with Leucothea ochracea (North American) which has prominent yellow markings on the lobes and filaments which the Mediterranean species lack, implying that their development would have to be different although it is not specifically stated how.

By use of their ctene rows, Leucothea travel through the water just like any other ctenophore, they will adjust their direction of travel once they sense a stimulus of some kind – like prey. They are able to travel vertically at higher speeds by using jet propulsion; they will travel much slower when moving horizontally. In times when they do not need to move, they cease use of their ciliary rows and just drift through the water. Leucothea is different in its foraging habits from other ctenophores because it glides through the water with its lobes spread wide – the lobes are lined with colloblasts which will allow prey to adhere to its surface, the auricles and tentacles will wave as well in order to catch other organisms. When moving horizontally, the oral lobes open and spread out, some compare it to flying and the auricles move in a way to help funnel in food; they are thought to only move horizontally during feeding. Leucothea will move to any area in the water column where their prey is the most abundant, in the case of a study carried out on Leucothea in California, 45% of the organisms were found collected between 18-22m feeding on various copepods that thrive at that depth. It is thought that they mainly feed horizontally since their prey seem to aggregate in layers at certain depths, it would not be optimal for Leucothea to travel upwards or downwards through the layer when they could travel through it and potentially have access to more food. They will travel extremely slowly during this period so as not to disturb the water and expose their presence while trying to forage. Their digestive tracts were found to have mainly copepods and snails, raising the idea that they may eat specific organisms, rather than everything.
