= Cambodgia =

Scientific classification
- Kingdom: Animalia
- Phylum: Ctenophora
- Class: Tentaculata
- Order: Cambojiida; Ospovat, 1985
- Family: Cambojiidae; Ospovat, 1985
- Genus: Cambodgia; Dawydoff, 1946
- Species: C. elegantissima

Binomial name
- Cambodgia elegantissima Dawydoff, 1946

Family of comb jellies

Cambojiida is an order of ctenophores belonging to the class Tentaculata. The order contains a single family, Cambojiidae, a single genus, Cambodgia, and species Cambodgia elegantissima.
