= Cryptolobatidae =

Scientific classification
- Kingdom: Animalia
- Phylum: Ctenophora
- Class: Tentaculata
- Order: Cryptolobiferida; Ospovat, 1985
- Family: Cryptolobatidae; Ospovat, 1985

Genera
- See text

Family of comb jellies

Cryptolobatidae is a family of ctenophores. It is the only family in the monotypic order Cryptolobiferida and contains two genera, each with a single species.

== Taxonomy ==
- Genus Cryptolobata
  - Cryptolobata primitiva (Moser, 1909) - found in Indonesia and may possibly be a larval form
- Genus Lobocrypta
  - Lobocrypta annamita Dawydoff, 1946 - found in the China Sea
