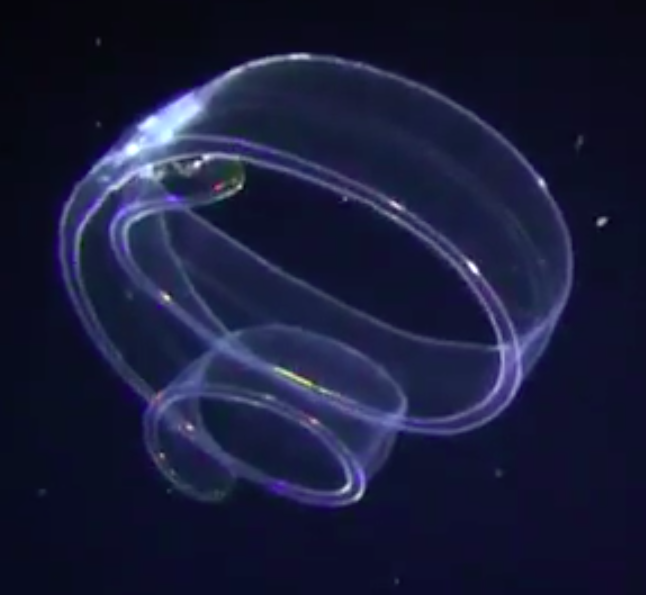
- Photographed in Hawaii

Scientific classification
- Kingdom: Animalia
- Phylum: Ctenophora
- Class: Tentaculata
- Order: Cestida
- Family: Cestidae
- Genus: Cestum; Lesueur, 1813
- Species: C. veneris

Binomial name
- Cestum veneris Lesueur, 1813

= Venus girdle =

Species of comb jelly

The Venus girdle (Cestum veneris) is a comb jelly in the family Cestidae. It is the only member of its genus, Cestum, and is also the largest of all known ctenophores.

== Description ==
Venus girdles resemble transparent ribbons with iridescent edges. They may grow up to 1.5 m in total length. Canals run the length of the ribbon in which bioluminescence activates when disturbed.

== Distribution ==
This species is pelagic and is found in tropical and subtropical oceans worldwide in midwater.

== Ecology ==
These animals swim horizontally using muscular contractions as well as the beating of the comb rows. The oral edge leads. They eat small crustaceans.
