= Collocyte =

Collocyte is a term variously applied in botany and zoology to cells that produce gluey substances, or that bind or capture prey or assorted objects by securing them with gluey materials and structures, or that simply look smooth and gelatinous. Literally the word means "glue cell", and it has a number of poorly distinguished synonyms, such as colloblast.

== Use in botany ==
In English the term "collocyte" (or, less formally, "glue cell") is uncommon in botanical publications. It appears more often in French texts; however, it sometimes is used in referring to individual cells in ground tissues of types characterised as collenchyma.

== Use in zoology ==
In zoology the word "collocyte" applies to several different types of cell in very different taxa, and there are a few similar terms used confusingly or interchangeably, such as colloblast. Some of the terms refer to specialised subject matter, so from time to time variations and inconsistent definitions have been coined independently in niche disciplines. For example, glial cells sometimes are called "glue cells" but have little in common with other types of so-called glue cells.

Apart from such difficulties, "glue cells" of various types commonly occur in taxa of animals that are practically unrelated to each other, and in such cases they are as a rule non-homologous and differ profoundly in their morphology, histology and function. This suggests that distinct terms should be allocated to the different types. The problem is so marked that to avoid confusion many workers are abandoning traditional terms in favour of new words.

=== Collocytes in Tunicata ===
Among the taxa of animals that have some form of cells that might be classed as collocytes, are the larvae of sessile forms of Tunicates. Near the head end, most of those have collocytes with which they permanently fasten themselves to the substrate.

=== Collocytes in Ctenophora ===
Perhaps the most striking and celebrated examples of collocytes are those of the Ctenophora (comb jellies). The Ctenophora use their colloblasts or collocytes in hunting and gathering food, in much the same way as members of the Cnidaria use cnidocytes; they keep the cells in a retracted form until they deploy them for securing prey. In keeping with their food capturing function, the collocytes sometimes are called "lasso cells", but as is to be expected of common names, the term is not precise and is variously applied to both colloblasts and cnidocytes. The retracted mechanism is kept coiled in the Ctenophora, as opposed to inside out in the Cnidaria. The Cnidaria evert their stings to penetrate the prey, but the Ctenophora eject microscopic balls of adhesive mucus that stick to the prey externally, trailing threads that as a rule do not lose attachment to the parent colloblast. The structure of these specialized cells is extremely complex and varies among ctenophore species. Their mechanisms are still under study.

=== Collenocytes ===
In some organisms collocytes that attach the animal to substrates must be able to release their grip as well as establish it. Commonly, though not always, this requires the ability to dissolve the adhesive substances after the adhesion has been achieved. When a glandular structure has the ability to perform both the adhesion and the dissolving of the adhesive, it is called a duo-gland This is a very common requirement and examples occur in Platyhelminths, both parasitic and free-living, Annelida, Echinodermata and other phyla. In some organisms the adhesion it affords is so remarkably reversible that it is used as the basis of locomotion over solid surfaces.

=== Confusion between collocytes and collencytes ===
Another class of apparently similarly named cells, "collencytes" occurs in sponges, but in this case there is little to do with adhesion. The term was derived from the tissue in which the cells occur: collenchyma. The name collenchyma in turn was borrowed from botany because of a fancied, essentially irrelevant, resemblance between sponge tissue and a particular class of ground tissue in plants. The collencytes are one of the classes of component cells of the sponges' tissue, loose mesenchyme between the ectoderm and the endoderm in the body wall. The functions of the collencytes are not yet fully understood; they are branched amoeboid cells and appear to produce collagen and play roles in forming sponge spicules. It even has been proposed that they have primitive nerve-like physiologic roles.
