= Tentacle =

Varied organ found in many animals and used for palpation and manipulation

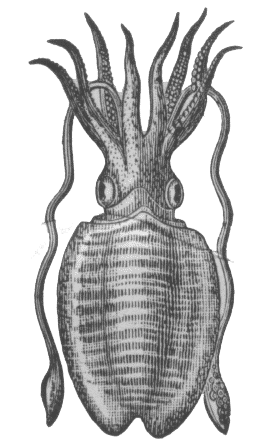
Cuttlefish with two tentacles and eight arms

In zoology, a tentacle is a flexible, mobile, and elongated organ present in some species of animals, most of them invertebrates. In animal anatomy, tentacles usually occur in one or more pairs. Anatomically, the tentacles of animals work mainly like muscular hydrostats. Most forms of tentacles are used for grasping and feeding. Many are sensory organs, variously receptive to touch, vision, or to the smell or taste of particular foods or threats. Examples of such tentacles are the eyestalks of various kinds of snails. Some kinds of tentacles have both sensory and manipulatory functions.

A tentacle is similar to a cirrus, but a cirrus is an organ that usually lacks the tentacle's strength, size, flexibility, or sensitivity. A nautilus has cirri, but a squid has tentacles.

== Invertebrates ==
=== Molluscs ===
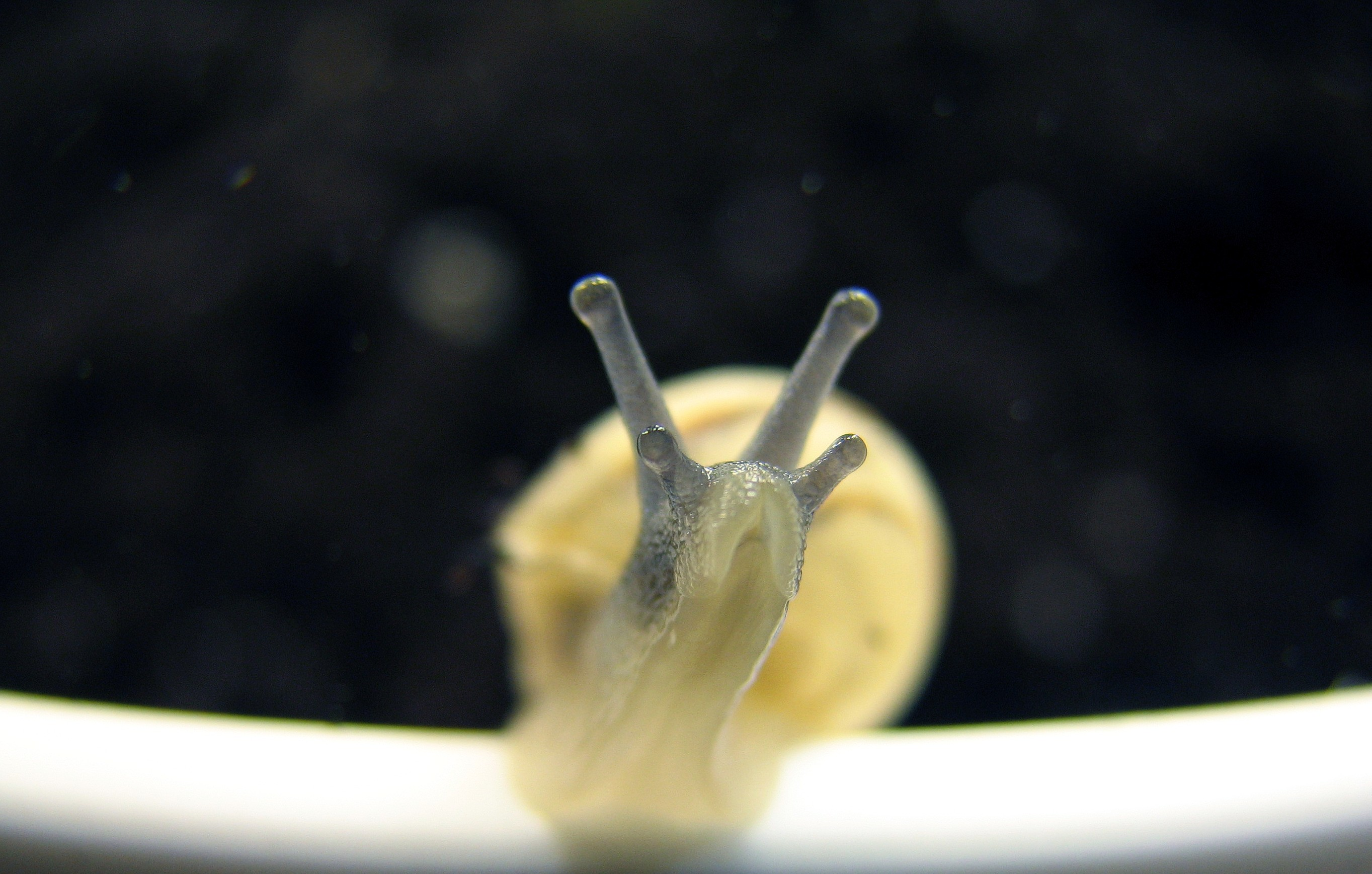
Front view of land snail showing upper and lower sets of tentacles

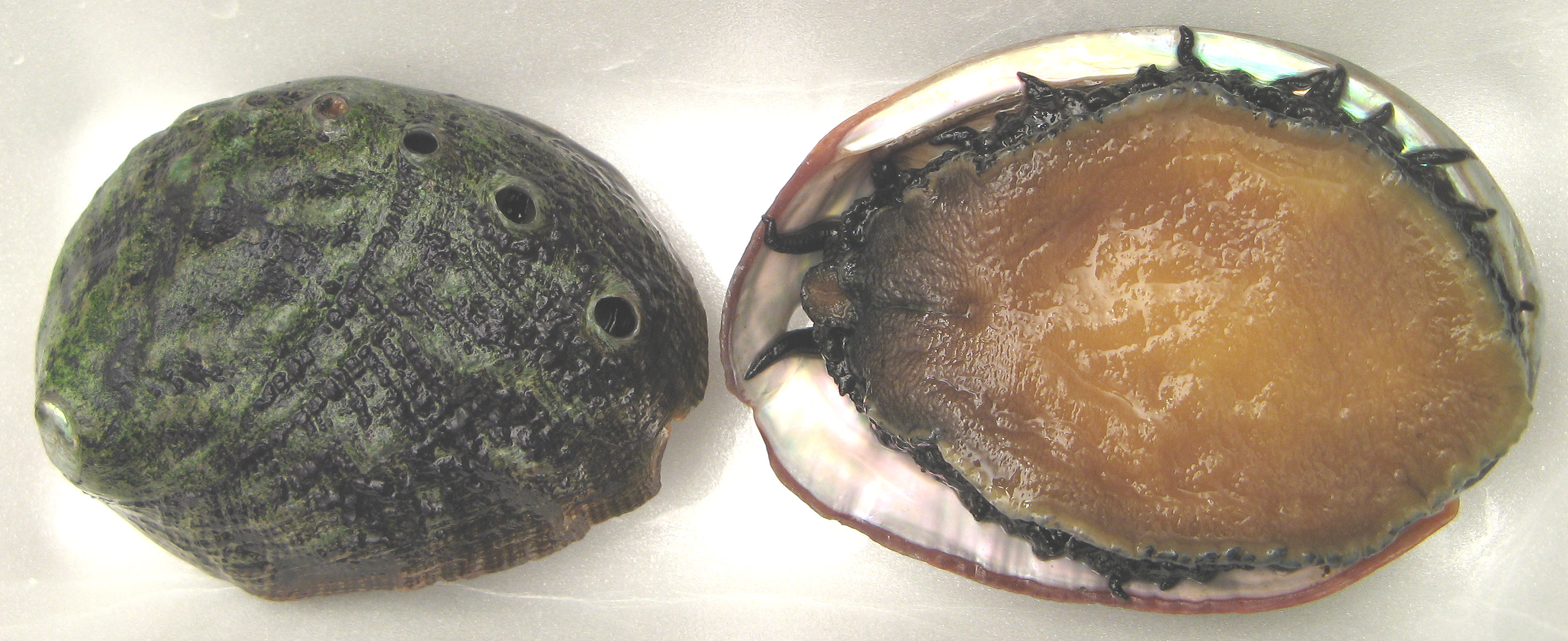
Abalone showing pallial tentacles

Many molluscs have tentacles of one form or another. The most familiar are those of the pulmonate land snails, which usually have two sets of tentacles on the head: when extended the upper pair have eyes at their tips; the lower pair are chemoreceptors. Both pairs are fully retractable muscular hydrostats, but they are not used for manipulation or prey capture. Molluscs have one pair of tentacles close to their mouths that hold close to their captured prey before they can consume it.

Some marine snails such as abalone and top snails, Trochidae, have numerous small tentacles around the edge of the mantle. These are known as pallial tentacles.

Among cephalopods, squids have spectacular tentacles. They take the form of highly mobile muscular hydrostats with various appendages such as suction disks and sometimes thorny hooks. Up to the early twentieth century "tentacles" were interchangeably called "arms". These tentacles are made of stalks of axial nerve cords that are covered by circular transverse muscle tissue that contract in response to stimuli. There is a layer of helical muscle that helps each tentacle to twist or turn in any direction where the prey is sensed.

The modern convention, however, is to speak of appendages as "tentacles" when they have relatively thin "peduncles" or "stalks" with "clubs" at their tips. In contrast the convention refers to the relatively shorter appendages as "arms". By this definition the eight appendages of octopuses, though quite long, count as arms. While arms are distinct from tentacles (a definition specific to the limb featuring peduncles), arms do fall within the general definition of "tentacle" as "a flexible, mobile, and elongated organ" and "tentacle" could be used as an umbrella term.

The tentacles of the giant squid and colossal squid have powerful suckers and pointed teeth at the ends. The teeth of the giant squid resemble bottle caps and function like tiny hole saws, while the tentacles of the colossal squid wield two long rows of swiveling, tri-pointed hooks.

=== Cnidarians ===
Cnidarians, such as jellyfish, sea anemones, Hydra and coral have numerous hair-like tentacles. Cnidarians have huge numbers of cnidocytes on their tentacles. In medusoid form, the body floats on water so that the tentacles hang down in a ring around the mouth. In polyp form, such as sea anemone and coral, the body is below with the tentacles pointed upwards.

The tentacles of the lion's mane jellyfish may be up to 37 m (121 ft) long. They are hollow and are arranged in 8 groups of between 70 and 150. The longer tentacles are equipped with cnidocytes whose venom paralyses and kills prey. The smaller tentacles guide food into the mouth.

=== Ctenophores ===
Many species of the jellyfish-like ctenophores have two tentacles, while some have none. Their tentacles have adhesive structures called colloblasts or lasso cells. The colloblasts burst open when prey comes in contact with the tentacle, releasing sticky threads that secure the food.

=== Bryozoa ===
Bryozoa (moss animals) are tiny creatures with tentacles around their mouths. The tentacles are almost cylindrical and have bands of cilia which create a water current towards the mouth. The animal extracts edible material from the flow of water.

=== Trypanorhynch cestodes ===
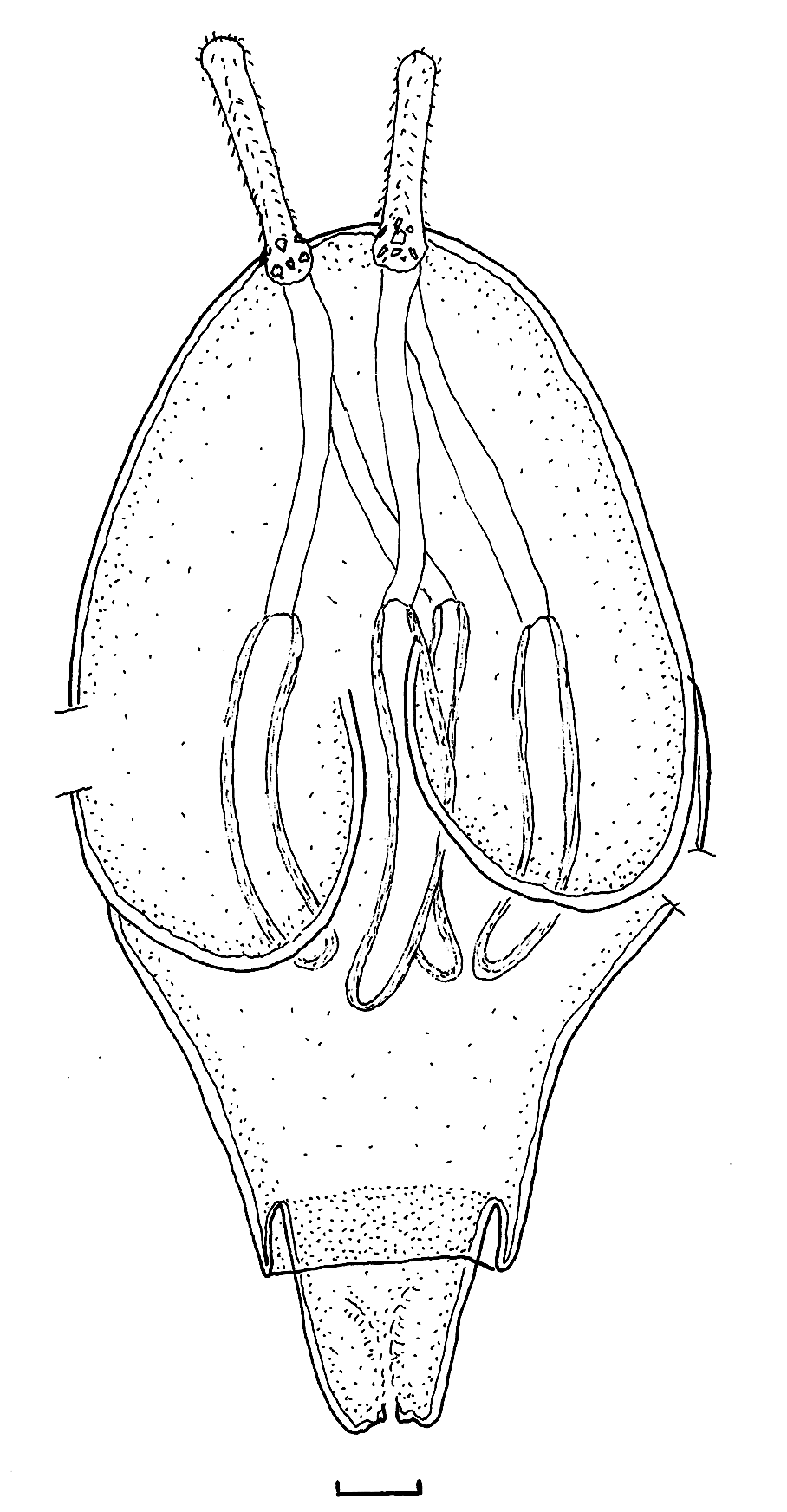
A larva of trypanorhynch cestode (only two tentacles shown). Scale-bar: 0.1 mm

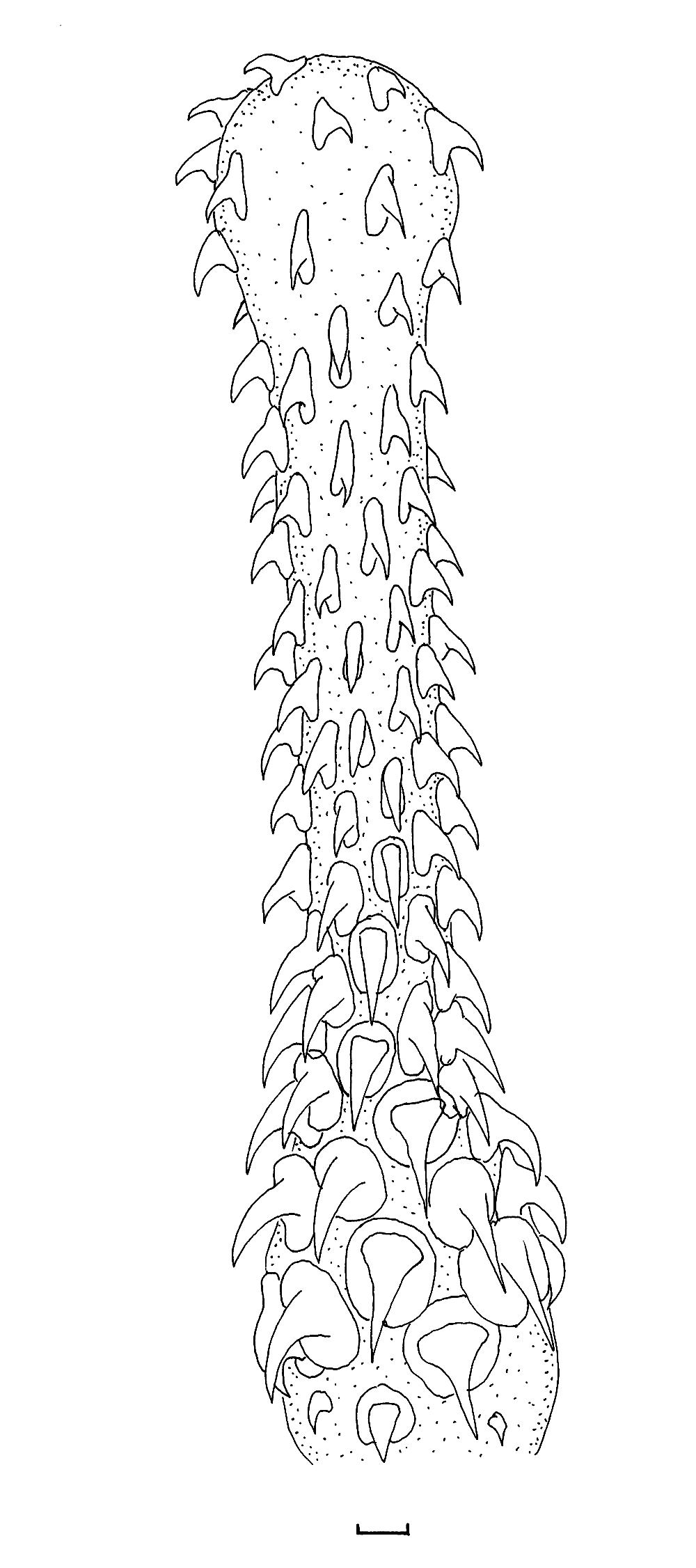
Detail of one tentacle with its spines. Scale-bar: 0.01 mm.

Trypanorhynch cestodes are parasitic in fish. Their scolex shows four tentacles which are covered by spines. These tentacles help the adult cestode to attach to the intestine of the shark or ray that they parasitize. The same tentacles are also present in the larvae.

== Vertebrates ==
=== Amphibians ===
The legless amphibians called caecilians have two short tentacles, one on each side of the head, between their eyes and nostrils. The current opinion is that these tentacles supplement the normal sense of smell, possibly for navigation and to locate prey underground.

=== Mammals ===
The star-nosed mole, Condylura cristata, of North America, has 22 short but conspicuous tentacles around its nose. They are mobile and extremely sensitive, helping the animal to find its way about the burrow and detect prey. They are about 1–4 mm long and hold about 25,000 touch receptors called Eimer's organs, perhaps giving this mole the most delicate sense of touch among mammals.

== Tentillum ==
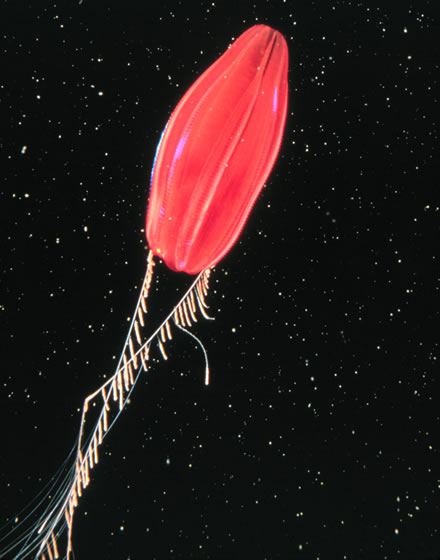
Deep-sea ctenophore trailing tentacles studded with tentilla

The word tentillum (pl.: tentilla) literally means "little tentacle". However, irrespective of size, it usually refers to a side branch of a larger tentacle. In some cases, such tentilla are specialised for particular functions; for example, in the Cnidaria tentilla usually bear cnidocytes, whereas in the Ctenophora they usually have collocytes. Siphonophores are an example of Cnidaria that use tentilla.
