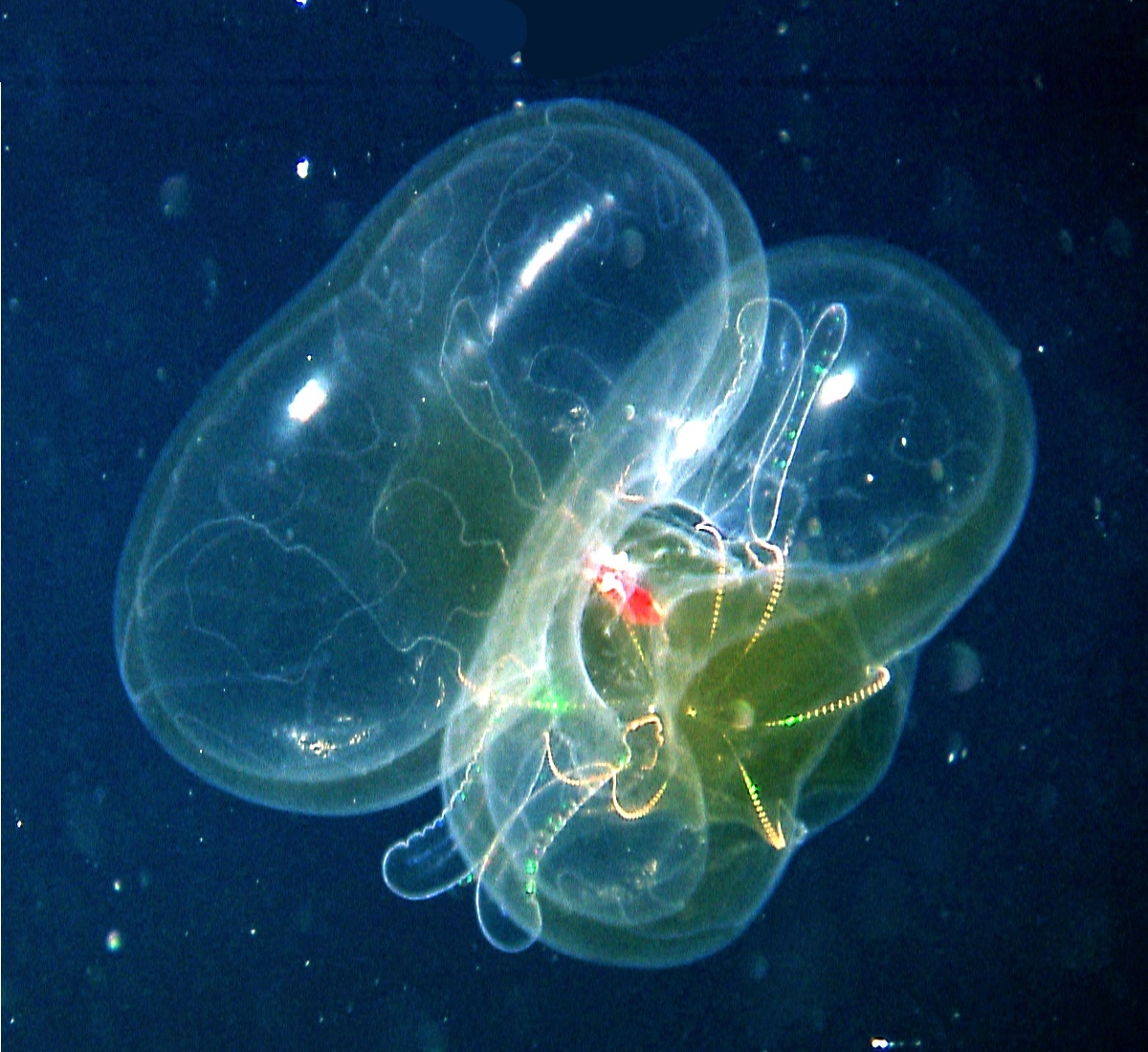

Scientific classification
- Kingdom: Animalia
- Phylum: Ctenophora
- Class: Tentaculata
- Order: Lobata; Eschscholtz 1825

Families
- Bathocyroidae Harbison & Madin, 1982; Bolinopsidae Bigelow, 1912; Eurhamphaeidae L. Agassiz, 1860; Lampoctenidae Harbison, Matsumoto & Robison, 2001; Leucotheidae Krumbach, 1925; Lobata incertae sedis Lobatolampeidae Horita, 2000; Ocyropsidae Harbison & Madin, 1982

= Lobata =

Order of comb jellies

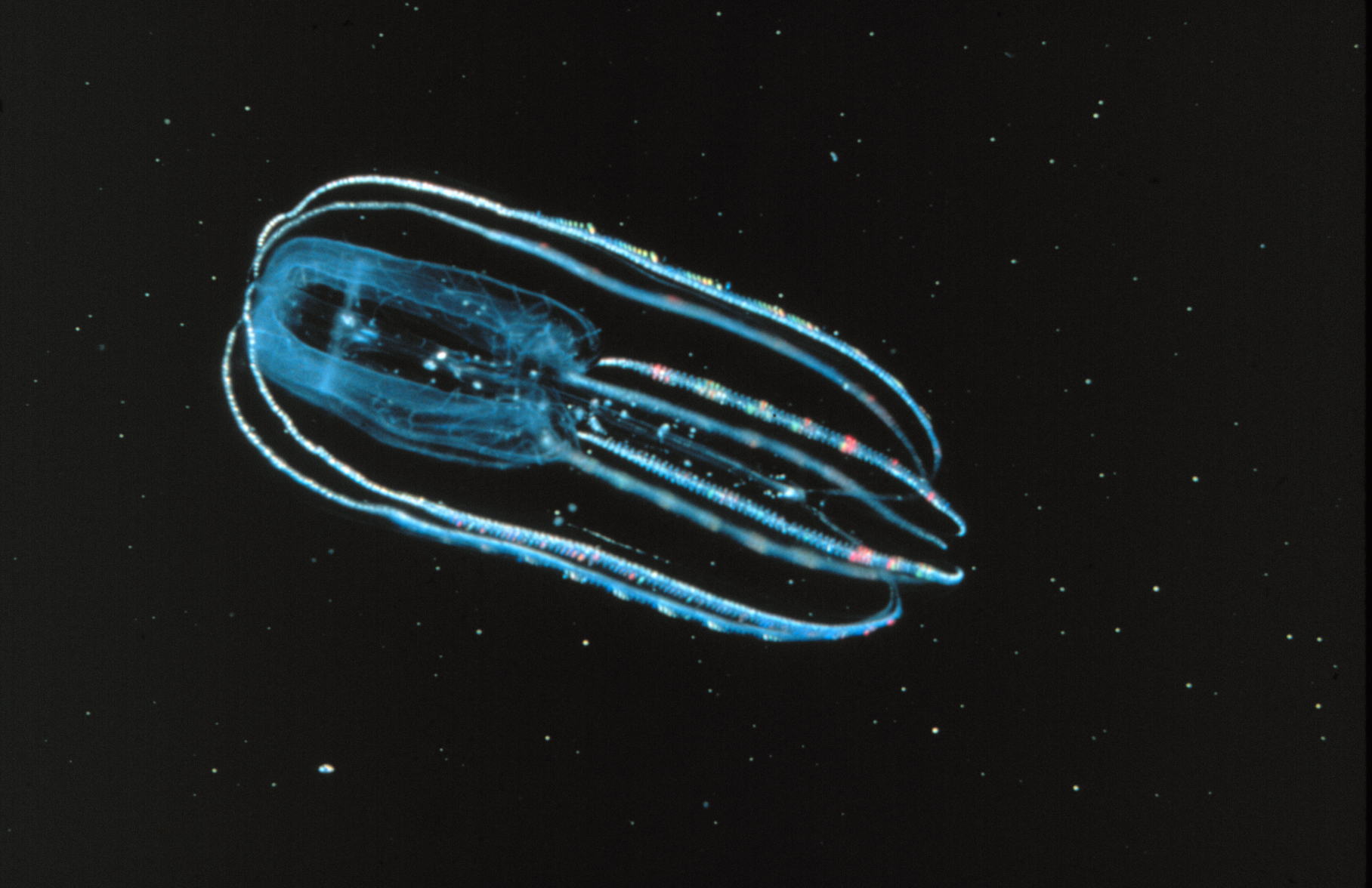
Bolinopsis infundibulum

Lobata is an order of transparent marine invertebrates belonging to the phylum of Ctenophora in the class Tentaculata, and are commonly referred to as comb jellies or sea gooseberries. There are currently 19 extant known species in the order of Lobata. Members of Lobata exhibit a compressed body in the vertical plane and a pair of oral lobes. They are known to inhabit marine pelagic surfaces and the marine shores.

== Anatomy ==
The lobates have a pair of lobes, which are muscular, cuplike extensions of the body that project beyond the mouth. Their inconspicuous tentacles originate from the corners of the mouth, running in convoluted grooves and spreading out over the inner surface of the lobes (rather than trailing far behind, as in the Cydippida). Between the lobes on either side of the mouth, many species of lobates have four auricles, gelatinous projections edged with cilia that produce water currents that help direct microscopic prey toward the mouth. This combination of structures enables lobates to feed continuously on suspended planktonic prey.

Lobates have eight comb-rows, originating at the aboral pole and usually not extending beyond the body to the lobes; in species with (four) auricles, the cilia edging the auricles are extensions of cilia in four of the comb rows. Most lobates are quite passive when moving through the water, using the cilia on their comb rows for propulsion, although Leucothea has long and active auricles whose movements also contribute to propulsion. Members of the lobate genera Bathocyroe and Ocyropsis can escape from danger by clapping their lobes, so that the jet of expelled water drives them backwards very quickly.

Unlike cydippids, the movements of lobates' combs are coordinated by nerves rather than by water disturbances created by the cilia, and combs on the same row beat together rather than in Mexican wave style. This may have enabled lobates to grow larger than cydippids and to have shapes that are less egg-like.

== Reproduction ==
Most members of Lobata exhibit hermaphroditism, where the individual carries both male and female sexual organs. Each comb jelly will release roughly 8,000 eggs during spawning, which occurs during the night when the temperature reaches between 18 and 22 °C (64 and 72 °F). Thirteen days after spawning, young Comb jellies will have grown to a size in which they can release eggs and sperm daily.

== Feeding ==
Members of Lobata are carnivores and are major predators of planktonic organisms such as copepods and fish larvae. By continuously pumping water into its body cavity, comb jellies are able to trap small prey on adhesive cells, known as colloblast, which are found on the tentacles and on the underside of their lobes.
