= Calanus (crustacean) =

- Calanus helgolandicus

Scientific classification
- Kingdom: Animalia
- Phylum: Arthropoda
- Clade: Pancrustacea
- Class: Copepoda
- Order: Calanoida
- Family: Calanidae
- Genus: Calanus; Leach, 1819

Synonyms
- Cetochilus Roussel de Vauzeme, 1834; Daphinia Rafinesque, 1817; Diarthropus Brady, 1918

Genus of crustaceans

Calanus is a genus of marine copepod in the family Calanidae (Order Calanoida). The genus was split in 1974, with some species being placed in a new genus, Neocalanus. The following species are recognised:

- Calanus aculeatus Brady, 1918
- Calanus agulhensis De Decker, Kaczmaruk & Marska, 1991
- Calanus chilensis Brodsky, 1959
- Calanus dorsalis (Rafinesque, 1817)
- Calanus euxinus Hulsemann, 1991
- Calanus finmarchicus (Gunnerus, 1770)
- Calanus glacialis Jaschnov, 1955
- Calanus helgolandicus (Claus, 1863)
- Calanus hyperboreus Krøyer, 1838
- Calanus jashnovi Hulsemann, 1994
- Calanus marshallae Frost, 1974
- Calanus pacificus Brodsky, 1948
- Calanus propinquus Brady, 1883
- Calanus simillimus Giesbrecht, 1902
- Calanus sinicus Brodsky, 1962
- Calanus torticornis (Brady, 1918)
