= Lipid pump =

The lipid pump sequesters carbon from the ocean's surface to deeper waters via lipids associated with overwintering vertically migratory zooplankton. Lipids are a class of hydrocarbon rich, nitrogen and phosphorus deficient compounds essential for cellular structures. This lipid carbon enters the deep ocean as carbon dioxide produced by respiration of lipid reserves and as organic matter from the mortality of zooplankton.

Compared to the more general biological pump, the lipid pump also results in a "lipid shunt", where other nutrients like nitrogen and phosphorus that are consumed in excess must be excreted back to the surface environment, and thus are not removed from the surface mixed layer of the ocean. This means that the carbon transported by the lipid pump does not limit the availability of essential nutrients in the ocean surface. Carbon sequestration via the lipid pump is therefore decoupled from nutrient removal, allowing carbon uptake by oceanic primary production to continue. In the Biological Pump, nutrient removal is always coupled to carbon sequestration; primary production is limited as carbon and nutrients are transported to depth together in the form of organic matter.

The contribution of the lipid pump to the sequestering of carbon in the deeper waters of the ocean can be substantial: the carbon transported below 1,000 metres (3,300 ft) by copepods of the genus Calanus in the Arctic Ocean almost equals that transported below the same depth annually by particulate organic carbon (POC) in this region. A significant fraction of this transported carbon would not return to the surface due to respiration and mortality. Research is ongoing to more precisely estimate the amount that remains at depth. The export rate of the lipid pump may vary from 1–9.3 g C m^{−2} y^{−1} across temperate and subpolar regions containing seasonally-migrating zooplankton. The role of zooplankton, and particularly copepods, in the food web is crucial to the survival of higher trophic level organisms whose primary source of nutrition is copepods. With warming oceans and increasing melting of ice caps due to climate change, the organisms associated with the lipid pump may be affected, thus influencing the survival of many commercially important fish and endangered marine mammals. As a new and previously unquantified component of oceanic carbon sequestration, further research on the lipid pump can improve the accuracy and overall understanding of carbon fluxes in global oceanic systems.

== Lipid pump vs. biological pump ==
Through the seasonal vertical migration of zooplankton, the lipid pump creates a net difference between lipids transported to the deep during the fall (when zooplankton enter diapause) and what returns to the surface during the spring, resulting in the sequestration of lipid carbon at depth. The biological pump encompasses many processes that sequester the CO_{2} taken up in the surface ocean by phytoplankton through the export of POC to the deep ocean. Although zooplankton are known to play important roles in the biological pump through grazing and the repackaging of particulate matter, the active transport of seasonally-migrating zooplankton through the lipid pump has not been incorporated into global estimates of the biological pump.

=== Comparison between net fluxes ===
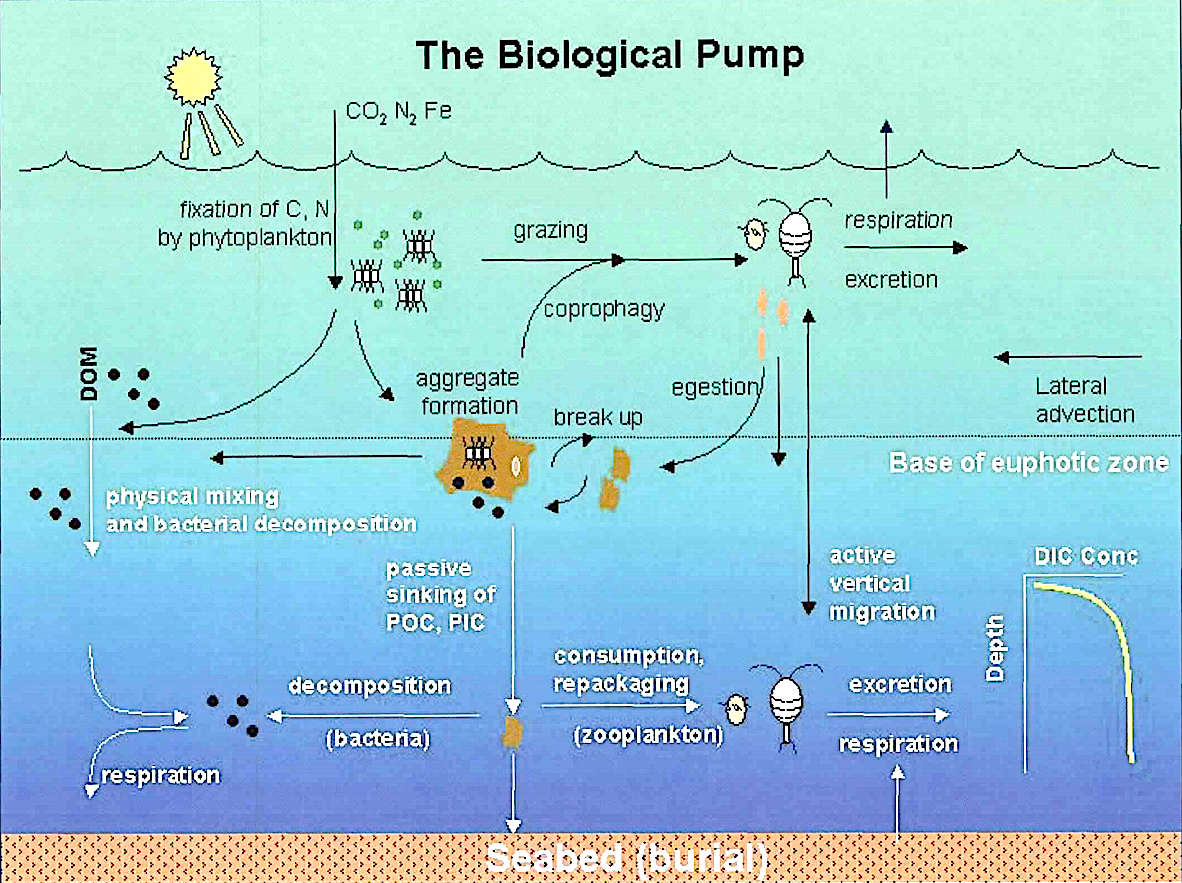
Components of the biological pump

The biological pump transports 1–4 g C m^{−2} y^{−1} of POC below the thermocline annually. The export flux of POC in the temperate North Atlantic out of the surface waters was found to be 29 ± 10 g C m^{−2} y^{−1}. However, studies have shown that processes such as consumption and remineralization contribute to a significant amount of this POC being attenuated as it sinks below the thermocline (near overwintering depths of ~1000 m). Furthermore, the remaining quantity of carbon in the North Atlantic from the export of POC below the thermocline has been calculated (2–8 g C m^{−2} y^{−1}) to be comparable to the seasonal migration of C. finmarchicus in the North Atlantic (1–4 g C m^{−2} y^{−1}) through the lipid pump. Therefore, the lipid pump may contribute 50–100% of C sequestration to the biological pump as net transport that has not been included in its current estimates.

=== Lipid shunt ===
Although the sequestration of marine carbon is a primary outcome of the biological pump, the recycling of nutrients such as N and P in organic matter plays a comparatively important role in maintaining the processes that facilitate this carbon export without removing nutrients for primary production. One key difference between the lipid pump and biological pump is that the ratios of nutrients such as nitrogen and phosphorus relative to carbon are minimal or zero in lipids, whereas the exported POC in the biological pump retains the standard Redfield ratios found throughout the world's oceans. This is primarily due to zooplankton in their copepodite stages releasing an excessive amount of nitrogen and phosphorus from excretion back into the surface. Thus, the production, transport, and metabolism of lipid carbon during overwintering do not contribute to a net consumption or removal of essential nutrients in the surface ocean, which is unlike many components of the biological pump. This process creates what is known as a "lipid shunt" in the biological pump, as the carbon sequestration of the lipid pump is decoupled from nutrient removal.

== Overwintering diapause vs. Diel vertical migration ==
Diel Vertical Migration (DVM) is a well-studied phenomenon, widespread in the temperate and tropical oceans, and previously understood to be the most significant contributor to the active export of carbon as a result of zooplankton migration. The most common form is the nocturnal DVM, a night-time ascent to the upper pelagic and a daytime descent to deeper waters. A relatively unique variation of this form is the twilight DVM, where the ascent happens during dusk and the descent around midnight (i.e., midnight sinking).

While DVM occurs on a daily basis, overwintering diapause (hibernation) occurs on an annual time-scale and enables zooplankton species, particularly Calanus spp., to adapt to seasonal variation in primary productivity in specific ocean basins. Individuals enter diapause and migrate deeper in the water column to overwinter below the thermocline. During diapause they survive on stored lipid reserves that are generated at the end of their time at the surface when nutrients are widely available. The seasonal end of diapause must be closely timed with the beginning of the spring phytoplankton bloom to enable acquisition of food to permit proper egg development and hatching. If the timing is disrupted, eggs that are hatched during diapause will have limited growth time and a lower likelihood of surviving overwintering, as thus is an example of match-mismatch hypothesis. Calanus spp. in ocean basins with shorter growth seasons will be increasingly sensitive to the timing of the spring bloom, such as polar regions.

In the Arctic and Antarctic environments, the productive season is typically short and certain copepods species vertically migrate during overwintering diapause. During the productive seasons of spring and summer, younger developmental stages of these copepods usually thrive in food-rich, warmer, near-surface waters, and they rapidly develop and grow. During late summer and fall, grazing pressure, nutrient limitation, and annual variations of irradiance combine to limit the pelagic primary production. Consequently, the food supply fades toward fall, and overwintering diapause initiates. These copepods migrate to deeper waters with accumulated lipid reserves for overwintering. The overwintering diapause stages remain in deeper waters with limited physical and physiological activity and ascend back to the near-surface waters and complete the life cycle at the onset of the following productive season.

== Calanus spp. ==
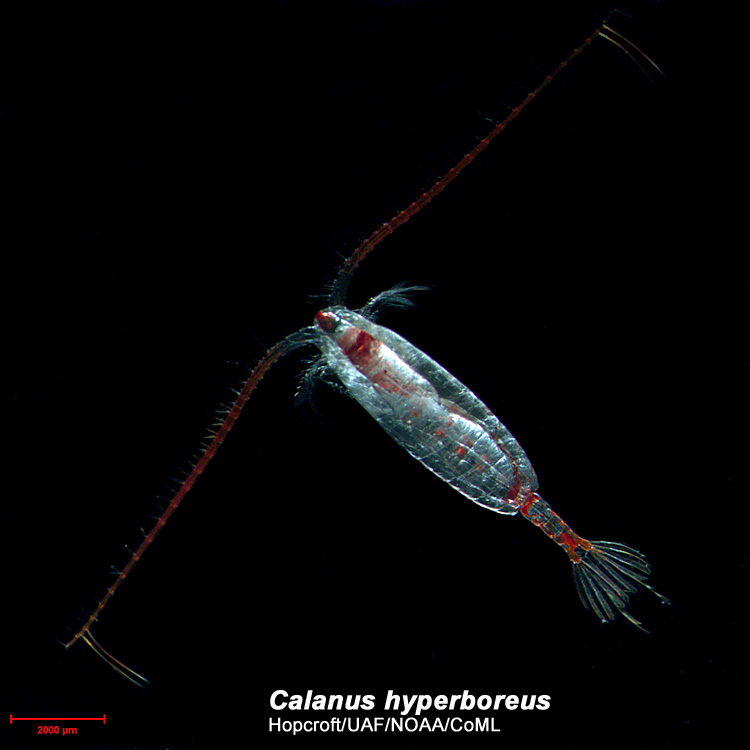
The copepod Calanus hyperboreus, ranging from 4–7 millimeters.

Ecology

Calanus spp. are abundantly distributed copepods, particularly in the polar and temperate North Atlantic. Studies attempting to quantify the lipid pump have primarily focused on the cousin species of C. finmarchicus, Calanus glacialis and Calanus helgolandicus, C. hyperboreus. C. hyperboreous, the largest of these species, uses an overwintering diapause (hibernation) strategy, and its life-history will be described in more detail as a representative Calanus spp. With a life cycle of two to six years on average, each C. hyperboreous individual can go through multiple overwintering periods. Positively buoyant eggs are spawned by females at depth and rise to the surface. Larvae (nauplii) first develop from these eggs, and complete their maturation into an early juvenile (copepodite) within one season, after which they undergo their first overwintering. Copepodite have three stages before maturing to the adult stages. While female Calanus spp. are generally expected to experience mortality after spawning, some may return to the surface to build up lipid stores before entering another overwintering and reproductive cycle.

Lipid accumulation and metabolism

Lipids are stored by all copepodite and adult Calanus spp. in an oil sac, which can account for up to 60% of an individual's dry weight. Calanus spp. accumulate these lipids while feeding closer to the ocean surface during the spring and summer months, aligning with phytoplankton blooms. Early in the growing season, Calanus spp. biogenergetics are allocated to reproduction, feeding and growth, but eventually shift to the production of lipids to provide energy during diapause. These lipids take the form of wax esters, energy-rich compounds like omega-3 fatty acids, and long-chain carbon molecules. At the end of the feeding/growing season, Calanus spp. migrate downward, with to depths varying from 600 to 3000m, but with the requirement that Calanus spp. settle below the thermocline to prevent premature return to the surface waters. Stored lipids are metabolized at these depths, accounting for approximately 25% of the basal metabolic rate. A 6–8 month-long overwintering period can drain a substantial fraction (44–93%) of the stored lipids despite the decreased metabolism.

Physical characteristics

The physical characteristics of Calanus spp. (i.e., dry weight, prosome length, lipid content, and carbon content) are always changing, varying between different regions, temporally, and across life stages. Based on isomorphism, or the similarity in form or structure of organisms, Calanus spp. may deviate in size but their basic physical structure remains constant across different overwintering stages and between different copepod species. The only significant taxonomic difference is the number of segments on the tail across developmental stage CIII and older (CIV, CV). With an outcome of isomorphism, dry weight (d [mg]) and prosome length (p [mm]) can be scaled as they are related as d = cp^{3}, where c is a coefficient. Observations identify the relationship between dry weight and prosome length with a coefficient between 3.3 and 3.5 for C. hyperboreus. Although this relationship is not supported extensively by empirical evidence, it has been used for model frameworks to observe Calanus spp. carbon content.

Relationships between NAO and Calanus spp. populations

In the North Atlantic and Nordic Seas, a primary long-term forcing that affects Calanus spp. and its habitat is the North Atlantic Oscillation (NAO) index, defined as the normalized difference in sea surface pressure between the Azores High and the Icelandic Low. While high NAO index values indicate a net flow of Atlantic water to the northeast and into the Norwegian Sea, low NAO index values indicate a reduced Atlantic water inflow into the Nordic Seas. In the Northwestern Atlantic, positive trends in the abundances of Calanus spp. correspond with higher sea surface temperatures and positive NAO forcing with a lag of one or two years. However, the influence of the NAO in explaining Calanus spp. abundance was substantially diminished when temporal autocorrelation and detrending analyses were involved.

== Regional differences ==
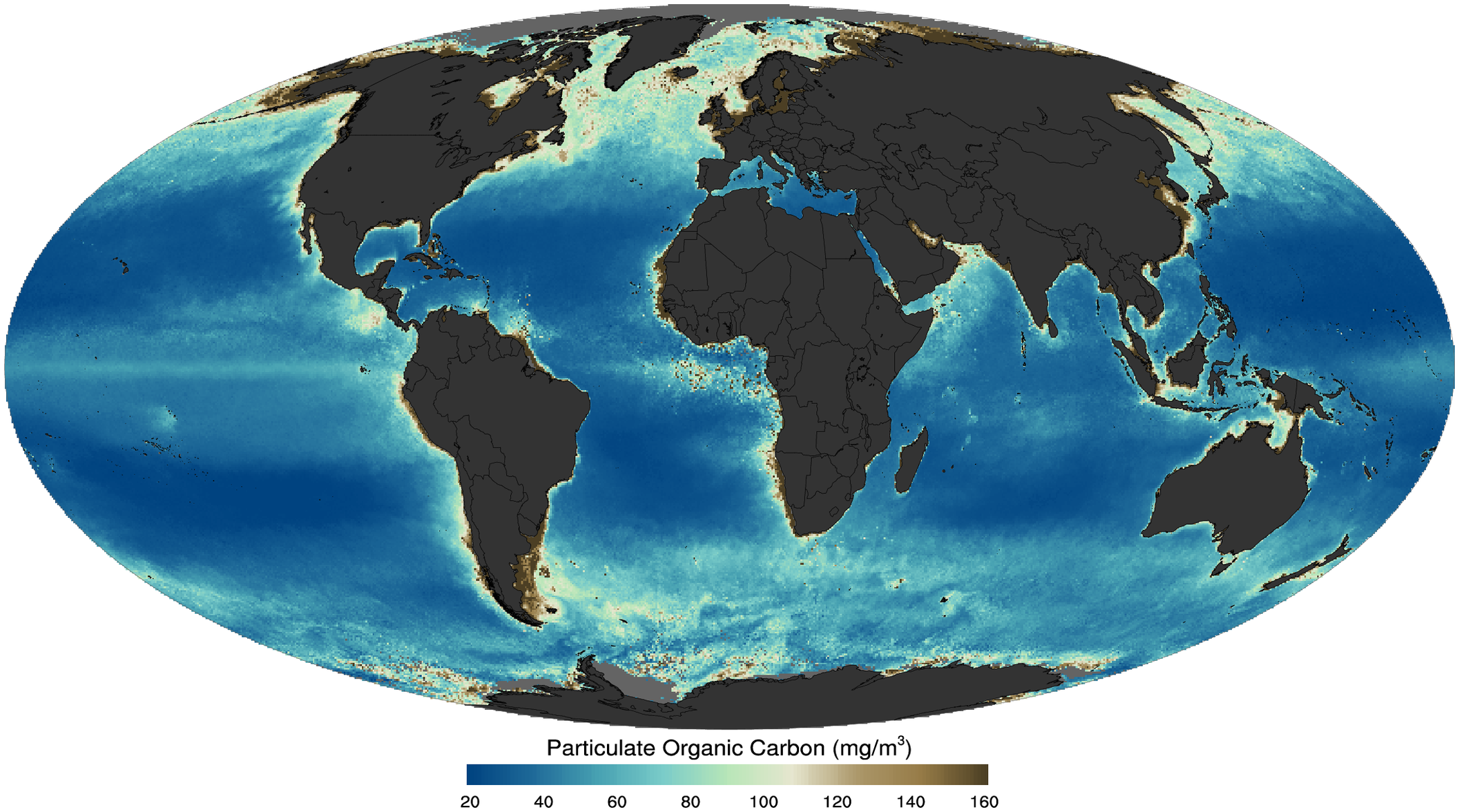
Global distribution of particulate organic carbon (POC).

Certain aspects of the lipid pump such as the diapause depth and duration of zooplankton can vary among regions that have different overwintering temperatures and resident community characteristics. There are other subarctic regions that have shown similar carbon export rates to those found in the temperate North Atlantic (1–4 g C m^{−2} y^{−1}) via seasonally-migrating zooplankton. For instance, C. glacialis and C. hyperboreus are the most dominant zooplankton species found in the Arctic Ocean at similar latitudes, and they contribute to a 3.1 g C m^{−2} y^{−1} flux of lipid carbon below 100 m during overwintering. A slightly higher maximum flux in lipid carbon (2–4.3 g C m^{−2} y^{−1}) below 150 m was observed in the subarctic North Pacific and was primarily attributed to the Neocalanus genus of copepods. In these areas, N. flemingeri, N. cristatus, and N. plumchrus are the primary contributors to the lipid pump, whereas, the subantarctic Southern Ocean consists primarily of N. tonsus contributing to a lipid carbon flux of 1.7–9.3 g C m^{−2} y^{−1} out of the euphotic zone. The rates or magnitude of these processes may slightly vary due to characteristic differences between these subpolar regions, which have largely been under-studied relative to their contributions to the lipid pump.

== Ecological impacts ==
=== Role in the food web ===
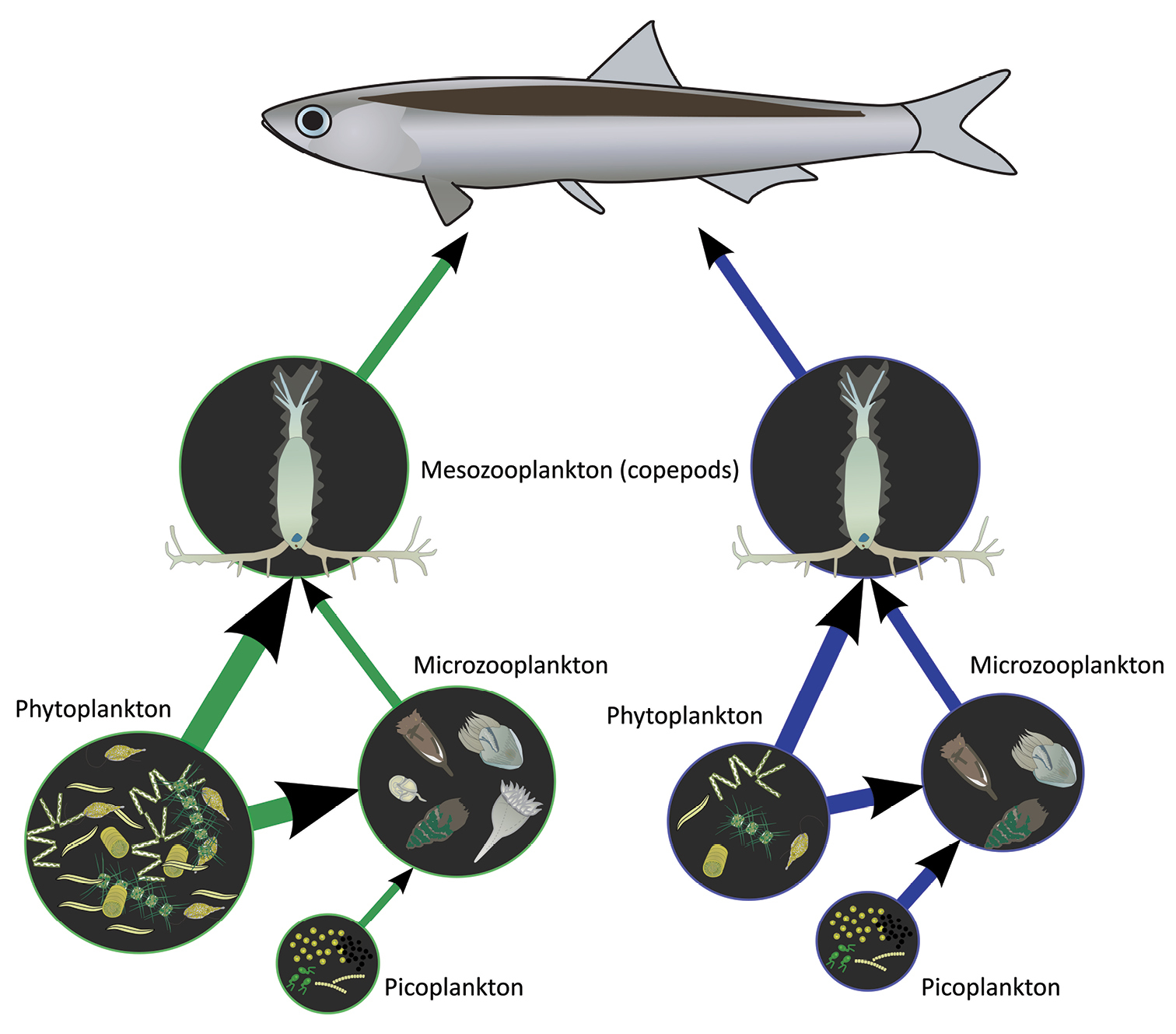
Planktonic relationships to fish.

The zooplanktonic Calanus spp. are not only important for moving carbon out of the photic zone and into the deep ocean, but these lipid-rich organisms play a critical role in the success of many marine species that depend on them as food. They comprise the majority of diets for fishes, seabirds and even large mammals such as whales. Copepods can account for about 70–90% of total zooplankton biomass, depending on region. Additionally, their eggs are a main source of food for commercially important fish stocks. The copepod eggs are buoyant and will rise to the sea surface, but are susceptible to predation by fish and other organisms. Copepods also provide the benthic community with food via sinking fecal pellets, meaning that as fish and smaller invertebrates excrete waste, that waste falls to the sea floor and organisms on the sea floor compete for the pellets as food. The role of copepods in the food web is crucially intertwined amongst other organisms.

Copepod abundance, specifically the C. finmarchicus, has a direct impact on the endangered right whales of the North Atlantic. North Atlantic right whales rely on copepods as their primary prey in order to meet their nutritional needs. To meet the right whale's energetic requirements they need about 500 kg of C. finmarchicus a day. Each copepod measures about 2–4 millimetres long which is about the size of a grain of rice and they weigh, on average, between 1.0274 and 1.0452 g cm^{−3}. A loss in C. finmarchicus has the potential to affect the right whale's migration, reproduction, and/or ability to successfully nurse their young (only for lactating females).

Relationship of organisms in an arctic system.

=== Economic impacts ===
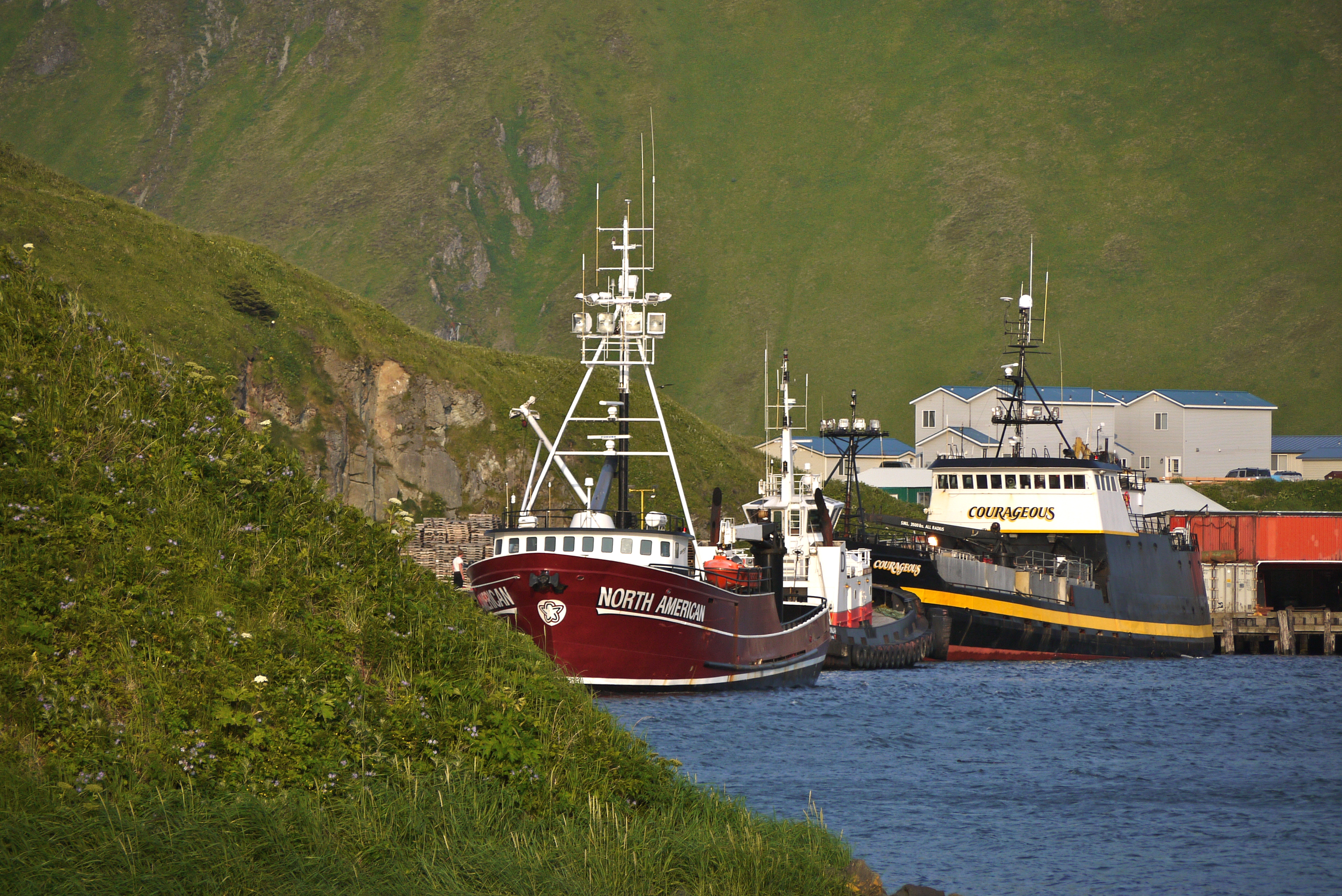
Pollock fishing vessels in an Alaskan port.

Many commercial and subsistence fisheries in arctic and subarctic regions fish for cod, salmon, crab, groundfish, and pollock depend on this energy-rich zooplankton as food. In 2017, the highest value of commercial fish species for the US was salmon ($688 million), crabs ($610 million), shrimp ($531 million), scallops ($512 million), and pollock ($413 million). Pollock alone is the largest fishery in the US based on volume, but is also the second largest fishery in the world supporting 2–5% of the global fishery production. Not only do millions of people rely on fish for subsistence, but recreational fishing is one of the most popular activities in the US. Recreational fishing contributes about $202 million to the US economy. Changes in the abundance and distribution of copepods could drastically affect the economic livelihoods of millions of people connected to the fishing industry or who rely on fishing as a primary source of protein.

== Climate change impacts ==
Anthropogenic climate change is estimated to impact the marine environment in a variety of ways. In the arctic and subarctic environments where a vast majority of Calanus spp. reside, melting ice caps and timing of the spring phytoplankton bloom could have implications for copepod density, distribution and timing of return from overwintering. A phytoplankton bloom occurs in the spring in arctic and subarctic environments when sea ice melts, allowing an increase in light to penetrate deeper into the water column, thus supporting photosynthesis. An input of freshwater from the sea ice melting increases the stratification of the ocean in the summertime. Stratification leaves nutrient-rich water on the bottom and nutrient-poor water on the top due to an increase in freshwater from the ice. However, in the wintertime, this region of the world experiences an increase in storms that bring nutrient-rich waters into the more nutrient-poor surface waters. Climate change alters the timing of the spring bloom by promoting an earlier or later ice melt. Warmer waters could lead to weaker stratification, meaning the density differences between the first and second layer of the ocean are increasing due to an increased flux of freshwater from ice melt. Typically, the amount of total annual primary productivity in the Bering Sea associated with a spring bloom is approximately 10–65%, however warmer waters could impact the amount of primary production occurring.

=== Reproduction and changes to the food web ===
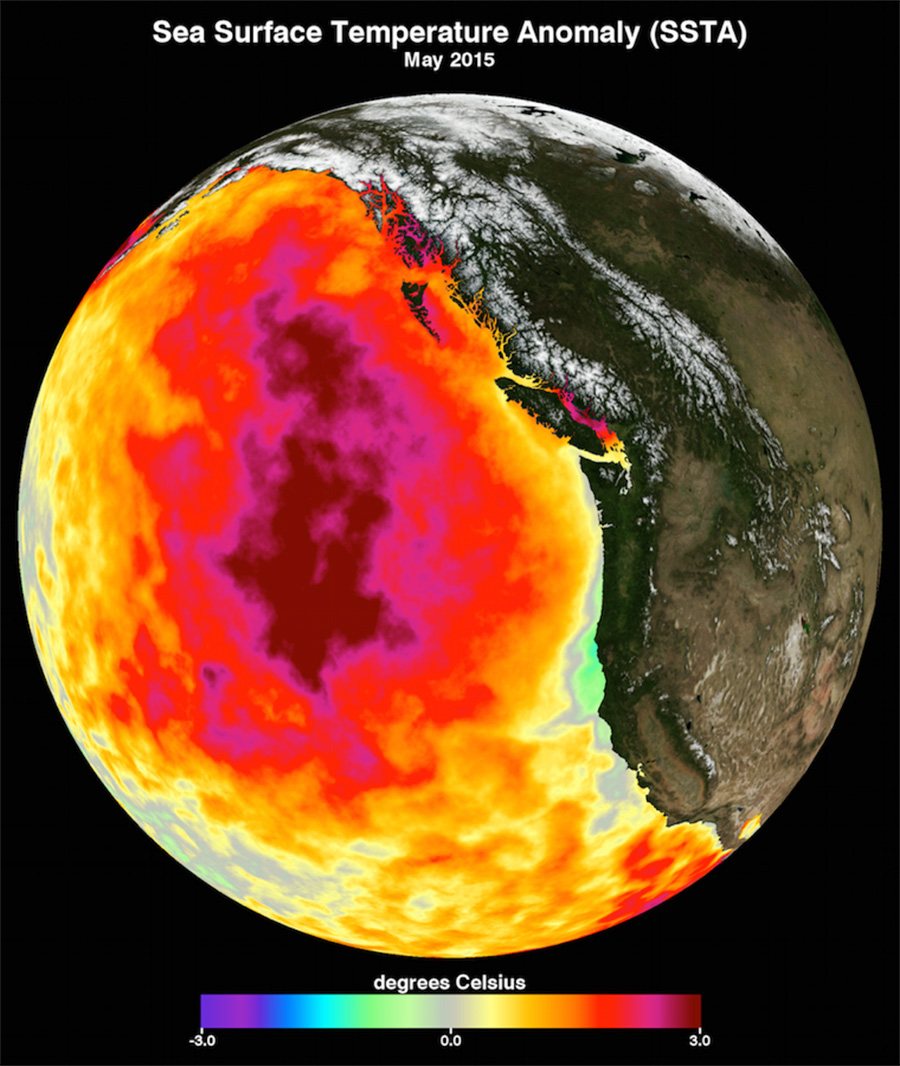
This data image shows the monthly average sea surface temperature for May 2015. Between 2013 and 2016, a large mass of unusually warm ocean water--nicknamed the blob--dominated the North Pacific, indicated here by red, pink, and yellow colors signifying temperatures as much as three degrees Celsius (five degrees Fahrenheit) higher than average. Data are from the NASA Multi-scale Ultra-high Resolution Sea Surface Temperature (MUR SST) Analysis product."

For the C. finmarchicus species specifically, the start of reproduction is linked to the start of the spring bloom. Thus, changes in the timing of the spring bloom would directly influence the reproductive capabilities of C. finmarchicus and alter the food chain from the bottom-up. However, the food chain could also be altered from the top-down through habitat disturbance and the removal of marine mammals and fish. Large-scale commercial fisheries exert top-down effects by lowering the abundance of larger species and increasing the amount of lipid-rich copepods and even paving way for other species to consume them. Under warming ocean conditions, prey switching is to be expected. Egg production and hatching success may also be affected with increasing sea surface temperatures and ocean acidification.

=== Physical ocean ===
Other climate change factors to consider that might influence these lipid-rich copepods are shifts of current systems, storm activity and sea-ice cover. In some regions of the arctic, specifically the Bering Sea, studies have forecasted a decrease in storms due to warming. This impacts the mixing of the water column that brings nutrient-rich water upwards. Copepods consume primary producers that require nutrients to survive. Limiting the amount of nutrients in the water column could decrease the abundance of these primary producers and subsequently reduce Calanus spp. abundance as well.

Changes in the water masses and temperature could have a direct effect on the zooplankton's vertical migration. The distribution of the zooplankton in the water column is controlled by the currents. The Calanus spp. use the water column for their vertical migration. Changes to the currents while Calanus spp. are in diapause could result in a reduction in the abundance of the copepods in the Norwegian Sea. Since the lipid pump is controlled through the movement of copepods, particularly Calanus spp., impacts of climate change that affect copepod abundance or seasonal migration will directly impact the lipid pump and carbon export to the deep ocean.

=== Climate modeling ===
A study that utilized climate modeling to simulate the effects of predicted increases in water temperature and salinity as a result of climate change on C. finmarchicus of the eastern shelf of North America forecasts lower abundance of copepods. The decrease in favorable environmental conditions is expected to decrease the size and density of C. finmarchius, and will likely have negative effects on whales and other components of the food web that are inextricably tied to copepods. The impact of diapause and variation in seasonal productivity was not explicitly included as increasing model complexity and more accurate accounting for Calanus spp. metabolic processes during diapause is required. The importance of diapause timing with spring plankton blooms is well-established, suggesting that there is potential for additional population impacts as a result of climate change, which would further reverberate throughout the ecosystem.

== Key implications ==
The 2015 paper by Jónasdóttir et al., marked the first comprehensive accounting for the amount of carbon sequestration resulting from the movement of lipids by vertically migrating zooplankton during their overwintering diapuse. Although only elucidating the impact of one particular species, in this case, C. finmarchicus, both the magnitude of carbon flux and widespread global distribution of Calanus spp. suggest the possible importance of the lipid pump in global carbon cycling by contributing an estimated 50–100% of carbon sequestration to the biological pump. Subsequent research has underscored this significance as estimates that attempt to more accurately account for the mortality and respiration rates of other overwintering Calanus spp. have suggested similar, although regionally variable, magnitudes of carbon export from the lipid pump. Overwintering diapause is an ecological strategy to enable Calanus spp. to adapt to the seasonal variability in food availability in ocean basins. Changes in the timing or length of high food periods are likely to negatively impact the distribution and abundance of Calanus spp. Changes in ocean temperature and salinity due to anthropogenic climate change are also predicted to decrease concentrations of Calanus spp. in some ocean basins. In addition to potential ecosystem impacts due to the large number of species that rely on copepods as a major constituent of their diets, there may be implications for oceanic carbon sequestration from consequent changes in the magnitude of the lipid pump due to overwintering zooplankton.

== Future directions ==
The global estimates of the biological pump have yet to include the elements of the lipid pump which could represent 50–100% of C export that is not accounted for. This is likely due to many observational challenges pertaining to the analysis of these seasonal migrations. As described above, more accurate ways to measure both mortality and respiration rates of overwintering zooplankton are being conducted in recent work, which are the two factors that primarily control the amount of lipid carbon that is sequestered at depth. For the zooplankton that survive overwintering, their upward migration during the spring returns a fraction of the lipid reserves to the surface as nonrespired carbon, with losses attributed to predation by deep-dwelling predators, disease, starvation, and other sources of mortality generally not accounted for. Similar to the lysis shunt, the dynamics of the lipid shunt causes uncertainty in observational methods of the lipid pump when comparing its efficiency to that of the biological pump. Additionally, large zooplankton usually avoid mooring instruments such as sediment traps during seasonal migrations which further explains why the lipid pump has yet to become incorporated into estimates of the global carbon export flux. These observations can be challenging to make given the remote locations they are conducted in and the harsh, deep sampling conditions, but these adaptations in the data collection are needed to better integrate global estimates of the carbon export flux provided by the lipid pump.

== See also ==
- Biological pump
- Oceanic carbon cycle
