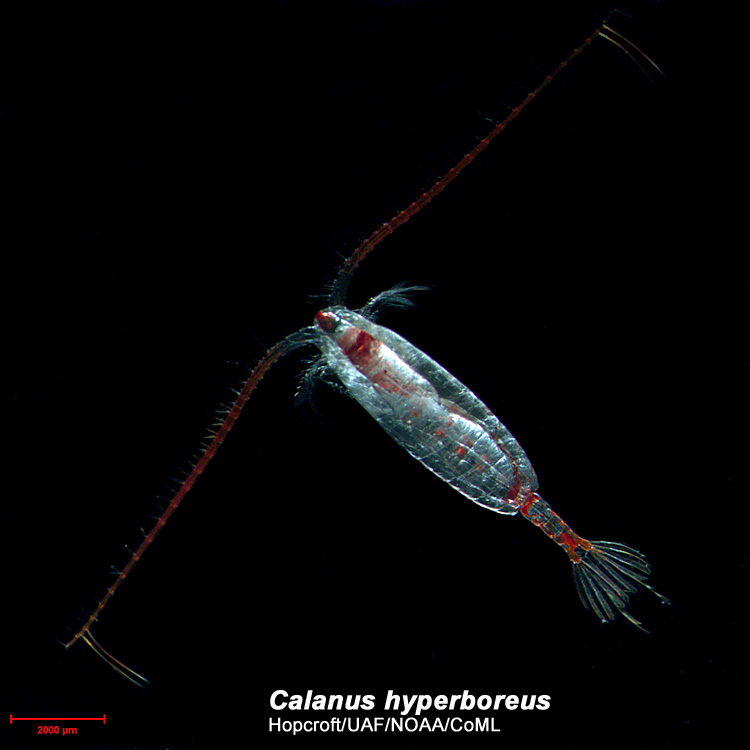

Scientific classification
- Kingdom: Animalia
- Phylum: Arthropoda
- Clade: Pancrustacea
- Class: Copepoda
- Order: Calanoida
- Family: Calanidae
- Genus: Calanus
- Species: C. hyperboreus

Binomial name
- Calanus hyperboreus Krøyer, 1838

Synonyms
- Calanus magnus Lubbock, 1854; Calanus plumosus Lubbock, 1854

= Calanus hyperboreus =

Species of crustacean

Calanus hyperboreus is a copepod found in the Arctic and northern Atlantic. It occurs from the surface to depths of 5,000 metres (16,000 ft).

== Description ==
The size of C. hyperboreus varies with its geography; individuals located in more temperate waters usually range from just over 4 to 5.5 millimetres (0.16 to 0.22 in) in more temperate waters, whereas those in colder areas usually range from 6 to 7 millimetres (0.24 to 0.28 in). The length of its prosome can vary anywhere from 2.5 to 5.6 millimetres (0.098 to 0.220 in). The antennae are longer or of equal length to the body. This copepod is very clear, and is generally colourless. The gut walls and posterior may be orange to dark red in colour, with a prominent lipid sac that is usually red-orange. The borders between segments have a deep red pigment.

== Distribution ==
Calanus hyperboreus is found in the Arctic, north of the Bering Strait in the Pacific and the Lofoten Islands in the Atlantic. It occurs as deep as 5,000 metres (16,000 ft).

== Ecology ==
=== Reproduction and life-cycle ===
This copepod spawns between October and March (winter), using lipid-reserves to fuel reproduction (making it a capital breeder). The male is most abundant during the breeding season, found between 500 and 1,000 metres (1,600 and 3,300 ft) in depth at this time. The females lay clutches at depths between 200 and 500 metres (660 and 1,640 ft), usually at intervals of 9 to 10 days, generally containing 51 to 150 eggs.

Life spans from one to two years to four to six years have been suggested for C. hyperboreus based on food availability. After the plankton bloom, the eggs develop into stage II and III copepodites and feed actively near the surface from May to October (summer). They then overwinter, generally at depths from 800 to 1,500 metres (2,600 to 4,900 ft), as stage III copepodites, and grow to stage IV copepodites over the next summer. After overwintering again, they grow to stage V during the next summer, increasing their dry mass by a factor of seven, and expanding their lipid content to be more than 65% of their dry mass. The development into an adult occurs over another winter, after which C. hyperboreus breeds. In some areas, such as the West Spitsbergen Current, stage V copepodites likely moult (below depths of 500 metres (1,600 ft) to males and females before their third-year of overwintering. During this winter, some mature females are found near the surface. This shows a life cycle of three years (in the case of the male, which is not found during the summer) and three to four years (for the female). In other areas, like the Greenland Sea Gyre, development into adults may occur in the second year of development, indicating a likely life cycle of two to three years.

Compared to the congeneric C. finmarchicus, C. hyperboreus has a higher concentration of lipids as a percentage of dry mass. Additionally, its lipid stores have a higher concentration of wax esters than C. finmarchicus and C. glacialis. C. hyperboreus also has longer chained fatty alcohols and (albeit to a lesser extent) fatty acids than the two other species. This is likely due to the higher concentration of energy per unit mass of longer chained fatty alcohols and acids. Finally, this species also has higher concentrations of polyunsaturated fatty acids than either C. finmarchicus or C. glacialis.

=== Feeding ===
This species is a herbivore and a filter feeder, feeding on phytoplankton and protists, especially diatoms.
