= Calanus marshallae =

Scientific classification
- Kingdom: Animalia
- Phylum: Arthropoda
- Clade: Pancrustacea
- Class: Copepoda
- Order: Calanoida
- Family: Calanidae
- Genus: Calanus (crustacean)
- Species: C. marshallae

Binomial name
- Calanus marshallae Frost, 1974

Species of copepod

Calanus marshallae is a species of copepod which forms part of the zooplankton in the northern Atlantic Ocean and the northern Pacific Ocean.

== Taxonomy ==
Several species of copepod in the genus Calanus tend to dominate the zooplankton of the northern oceans; Calanus finmarchicus is the best known species, but historically there was little to distinguish it from other closely related species. Analysis in 1974 by the American marine biologist B.W. Frost of specimens gathered throughout the northern Atlantic and Pacific Oceans, and the Arctic Ocean, showed that there are three species present; C. finmarchicus, C. glacialis and a new species, C. marshallae. Taxonomic markers were found through which these three species could be identified from each other in the field.

== Distribution and habitat ==
In the northern Atlantic, Calanus marshallae has been recorded from Spitsbergen, Saint Lawrence Island, the Chukchi Sea, the Bering Sea, the coasts of Greenland, the Beaufort Sea, Banks Island and the Aleutian Islands. In the northern Pacific, it is known from the Gulf of Alaska, British Columbia and the coasts of Washington and Oregon. It is an open water species, and the nauplius larvae occur at depths of 65 m (200 ft). C. glacialis is mainly found on the shelf that surrounds the Arctic Ocean, C. finmarchicus mainly in the northern Atlantic Ocean and C. marshallae mainly in the Bering Sea and northern Pacific Ocean.

== Ecology ==
Calanid copepods play a key role in the food web in northern seas, providing a link between the photosynthetically active primary producers and the commercially important fish which feed in these waters.

As they swim vertically, newly moulted females leave a pheromone trail behind them in the water some tens of centimetres long. Males swim mainly horizontally and on encountering a trail they do a little wiggle dance before chasing and homing in on the female. Following the first contact, the female jerks away and the male follows. After several touch/jump sequences, mating occurs.
