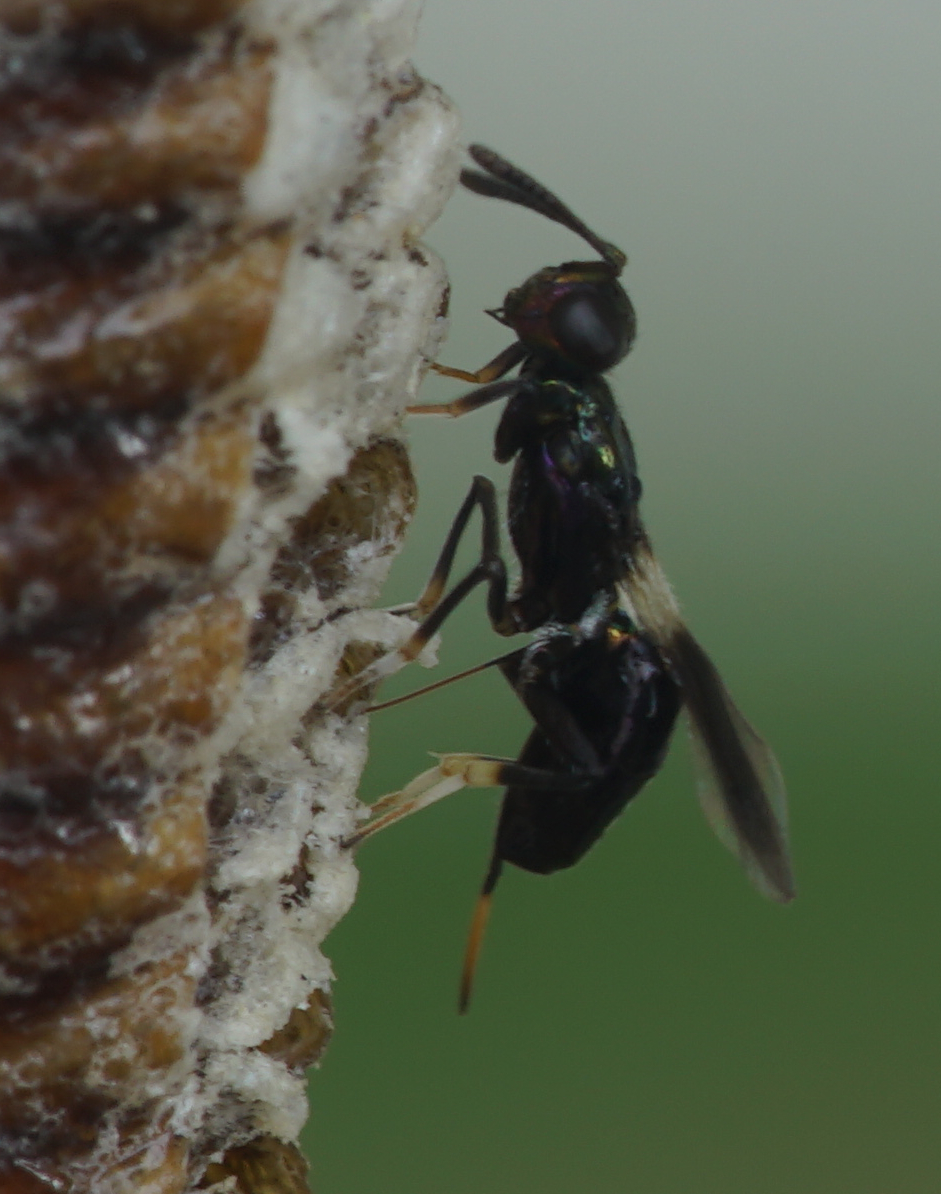
- Eupelmus antipoda

Scientific classification
- Kingdom: Animalia
- Phylum: Arthropoda
- Class: Insecta
- Order: Hymenoptera
- Family: Eupelmidae
- Genus: Eupelmus; Dalman, 1820

= Eupelmus =

Genus of insects

Eupelmus is a genus of wasps belonging to the family Eupelmidae. Species are parasitic, being either parasitoids attacking a wide variety of insects, or phytophagous with larvae feeding on different species of plants.

The genus has more than 330 species and a cosmopolitan distribution.

Species include:

- Eupelmus achreiodes Perkins, 1910
- Eupelmus acinellus Askew, 2009
- Eupelmus antipoda Ashmead, 1900
- Eupelmus niger Ashmead, 1901 - known parasitoid of Hylaeus anthracinus
- Eupelmus nihoaensis Timberlake, 1926
- Eupelmus orientalis (Crawford, 1913)
- Eupelmus vuilleti (Crawford, 1913)
