= Calanus pacificus =

Scientific classification
- Domain: Eukaryota
- Kingdom: Animalia
- Phylum: Arthropoda
- Class: Copepoda
- Order: Calanoida
- Family: Calanidae
- Genus: Calanus
- Species: C. pacificus

Binomial name
- Calanus pacificus Brodsky, 1948

Species of crustacean

Calanus pacificus is a species of copepod found in the Pacific Ocean. The female has an average length of about 3.1 millimetres (0.12 in), and the male has a value of about 2.9 millimetres (0.11 in).

== Description ==
The female is about 3.1 millimetres (0.12 in) in length, and typically ranges from 2.2 to 5.3 millimetres (0.087 to 0.209 in) in length. The male has an average length of about 2.9 millimetres (0.11 in), and ranges in length from about 2.4 to 4.4 millimetres (0.094 to 0.173 in). The male has enlarged aesthetes (found on the antennules), which are likely used for chemoreception.

== Distribution ==
This copepod is found in the Pacific, from Alaska to Central America in coastal North America, and from Russia to southeast Asia in Asia.

== Ecology ==
=== Life cycle and reproduction ===
When the male senses a potential mate (likely through pheromones), it swims irregularly, alternating zig-zags with looping and figure eights. This is likely to find the potential mate or as a precopulatory behaviour. C. pacificus This copepod typically lays a clutch of 24 to 54 eggs. The egg production rate increases with an increase in food, indicating that C. pacificus is an income breeder, relying on food stores gained concurrently with reproduction to breed. In addition, it has three generations per year, with generations being about 10 to 25 days. This copepod does not migrate until it is a nauplius stage III, when it moves closer to the surface. This behaviour continues until it is a nauplius stage V. Then, until maturity, the depth during the day gets progressively deeper. The depth of migration is influenced by predation; when there are more predators, the intensity of diel vertical migration increases.

=== Feeding ===
C. pacificus is a particle feeder, feeding on plankton, copepod nauplii, and marine snow. It generally feeds on the food of greatest abundance and size. However, it also rejects low quality food, likely through chemical means, in addition to rejecting inert particles. Examples of low quality food include Ptychodiscus brevis, which produces neurotoxins, and Protoceratium reticulatum, which causes regurgitation or an elevated heart rate. Additionally, the presence of the latter decreases the intake of a preferred food, Gyrodiniurn resplendens. This allows P. reticulatum to decrease the concentration of C. pacificus when the former is in bloom. C. pacificus can take advantage of marine snow as food, with aggregations of various compositions being responsible for between about .3 and 1.5 micrograms (4.6×10^{−6} and 2.31×10^{−5} gr) dry weight of fecal pellets copepod^{−1} hr^{−1} (per copepod per hour), at a maximum feeding rate. Assuming a 70% assimilation efficiency, this species can ingest from .3 to 1.8 micrograms (4.6×10^{−6} to 2.78×10^{−5} gr) marine snow copepod^{−1} hr^{−1}. Another important food source, diatoms, are able to be ingested at a rate of about 1.1 micrograms (1.7×10^{−5} gr) copepod^{−1} hr^{−1}.
