= Calanus euxinus =

Scientific classification
- Kingdom: Animalia
- Phylum: Arthropoda
- Clade: Pancrustacea
- Class: Copepoda
- Order: Calanoida
- Family: Calanidae
- Genus: Calanus
- Species: C. euxinus

Binomial name
- Calanus euxinus Hulsemann, 1991

Species of crustacean

Calanus euxinus is a copepod ubiquitous to the Black Sea and the Marmara Sea and a main source of prey for small and juvenile fish as the largest part of the zooplankton biomass.

Calanus euxinus was misidentified originally as a variation of Calanus finmarchicus and Calanus helgolandicus, until being labeled as its own species. Calanus euxinus are considerably larger than Mediterranean species, like Calanus helgolandicus, with a larger lipid reserve.

Previous origin hypotheses, assumed the Black Sea Calanus to be derived from a population of Calanus helgolandicus in the Mediterranean, but more recent phenetic research points to earlier population divergences from the Boreal derived Calanus.

== Diel vertical migration ==
Like other copepods, Calanus euxinus follow typical vertical migration patterns, hunting at night at the surface and sinking near the oxygen minimum zone during the daytime. There is no significant difference in seasonal total abundance in deep-water, as the final copopodite stage staggers entering their diapause state from June to September and rest along the lower limit of the oxygenated layer of the water column.

Diel vertical migrations can span 80-180 meters in depth. The bottom of the migration tends to remain consistent temperatures year-round, with water column temperature gradients becoming steep during summer and autumn stratification. In the Black Sea, there is very little change in salinity, staying brackish throughout the water column, while the Marmara Sea experiences consistently steep salinity gradients.

== Salinity adaptations ==
The difference in salinity gradients between the Black and Marmara Seas leads to limitations on the development of Calanus euxinus. There are noticeable examples of the Black Sea and estuarine copepods displaying decreases in swimming activity, total locomotion, body length, and development time. Overall, the Marmara Sea population of Calanus euxinus tend to develop to adult stages faster than the Black Sea, which leads to a reduction of large lipid storage, smaller bodies, and significantly higher respiration rates due to the development under high salinity conditions.
