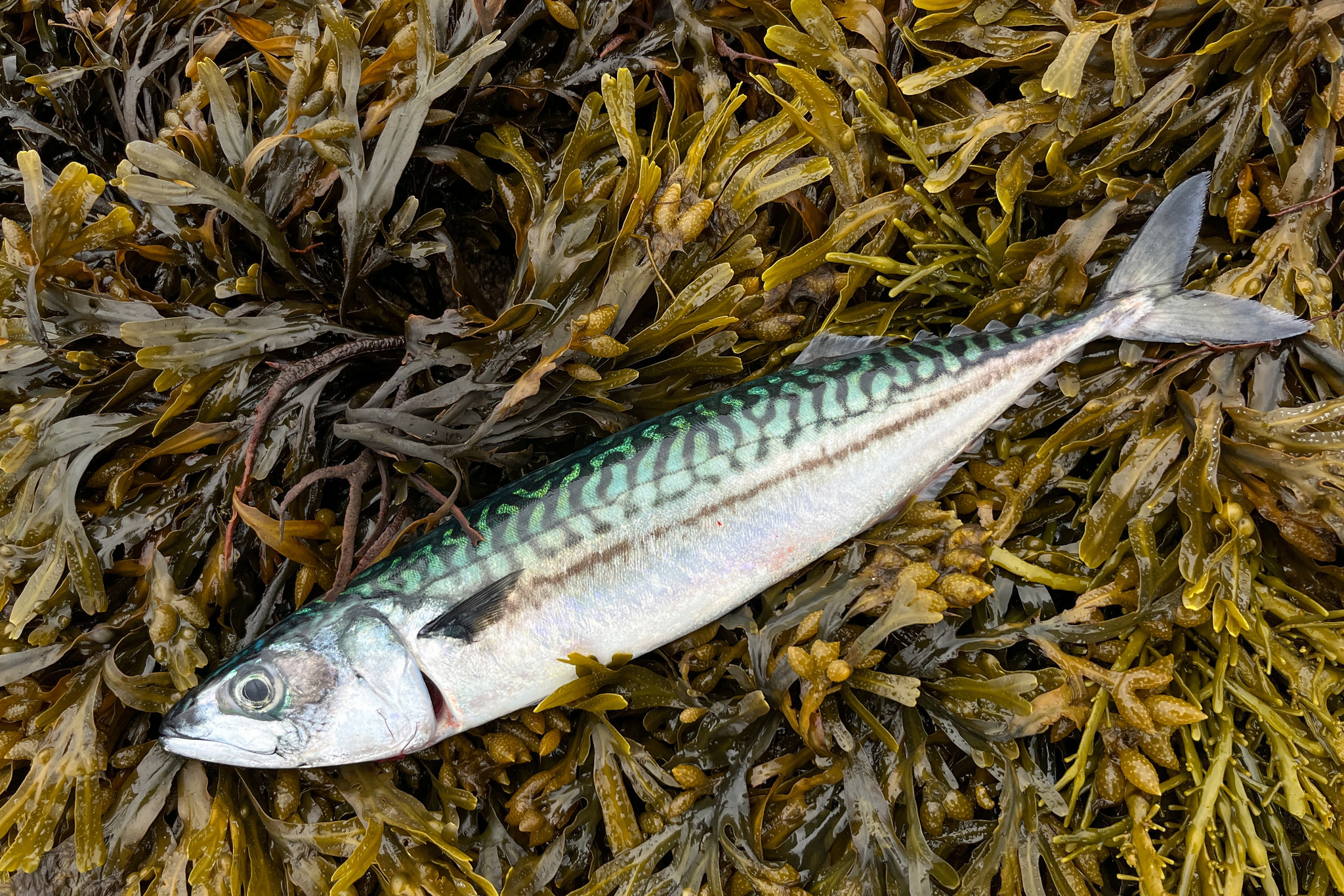

Conservation status
- Least Concern (IUCN 3.1)

Scientific classification
- Kingdom: Animalia
- Phylum: Chordata
- Class: Actinopterygii
- Division: Teleostei
- Order: Scombriformes
- Family: Scombridae
- Tribe: Scombrini
- Genus: Scomber
- Species: S. scombrus

Binomial name
- Scomber scombrus Linnaeus, 1758

Synonyms
- Scomber scomber Linnaeus, 1758; Scomber glauciscus Pallas, 1814; Scomber vernalis Mitchill, 1815; Scomber vulgaris Fleming, 1828; Scomber vulgaris Wood, 1837; Scomber punctatus Couch, 1849; Scomber scriptus Couch, 1863

= Atlantic mackerel =

Species of fish

The Atlantic mackerel (Scomber scombrus), also known as Boston mackerel, Norwegian mackerel, Scottish mackerel or just mackerel, is a species of mackerel found in the temperate waters of the Mediterranean Sea, the Black Sea, and the northern Atlantic Ocean, where it is extremely common and occurs in huge shoals in the epipelagic zone down to about 200 m (660 ft). It spends the warmer months close to shore and near the ocean surface, appearing along the coast in spring and departing with the arrival of colder weather in the fall and winter months. During the fall and winter, it migrates out into deeper and more southern water, seeking warmer temperatures.

The Atlantic mackerel's body is elongate, steel-blue marked with wavy black lines dorsally and silvery-white ventrally, its snout long and pointed. It possesses two spiny dorsal fins, which are spaced far apart, two pectoral fins, and small caudal and anal fins, also spaced far apart. 4–6 dorsal finlets and 5 anal finlets are typical among members of this species. The fish's body tapers down its length, ending with a large tail fin. Typical size for a mature fish is 30 cm (0.98 ft), but individuals have been caught as large as 60 cm (2.0 ft). The maximum published weight is 3.4 kg (7.5 lb). Reproduction, which is oviparous, occurs near the shore in the spring and summer, during which a female can produce as many as 450,000 eggs. Juveniles reach sexual maturity at around 2 years of age and can live to be 17.

A highly commercial species, the Atlantic mackerel is sought after for its meat, which is strong in flavor and high in oil content and omega-3 fatty acids among other nutrients. Nearly 1 million tonnes of Atlantic mackerel are caught each year globally, the bulk of which is sold fresh, frozen, smoked, or canned. Despite its highly commercial status, the Atlantic mackerel is listed as Least Concern by the International Union for Conservation of Nature (IUCN) and global catch has remained sustainable.

== Taxonomy and phylogeny ==
The Atlantic mackerel was first described in 1758 by Swedish zoologist Carl Linnaeus in his 10th edition of Systema Naturae. Linnaeus gave it the scientific name Scomber scomber from the Greek word skombros meaning "tunny" or "mackerel". Because of its wide distribution, the Atlantic mackerel was independently described six more times by five different scientists between 1814 and 1863. Its specific name was later changed to scombrus by B. B. Collette and C. E. Nauen in 1983. It is differentiated from its congeners in a number of ways, the first being the absence of a swim bladder. Its palatine bone is also wider than other members of its genus and its otolith is oval-shaped where its congeners' are rectangular.

In the eastern Atlantic Ocean there are three stocks differentiated by location and time at which spawning occurs, but studies have not found any distinct genetic differences between these populations. Genetic differences only start to appear at the transatlantic scale, a fact supported by a lack of migration between western and eastern Atlantic populations, whereas eastern Atlantic stocks are known to converge in certain locations like the Norwegian Sea and North Sea.

== Description ==
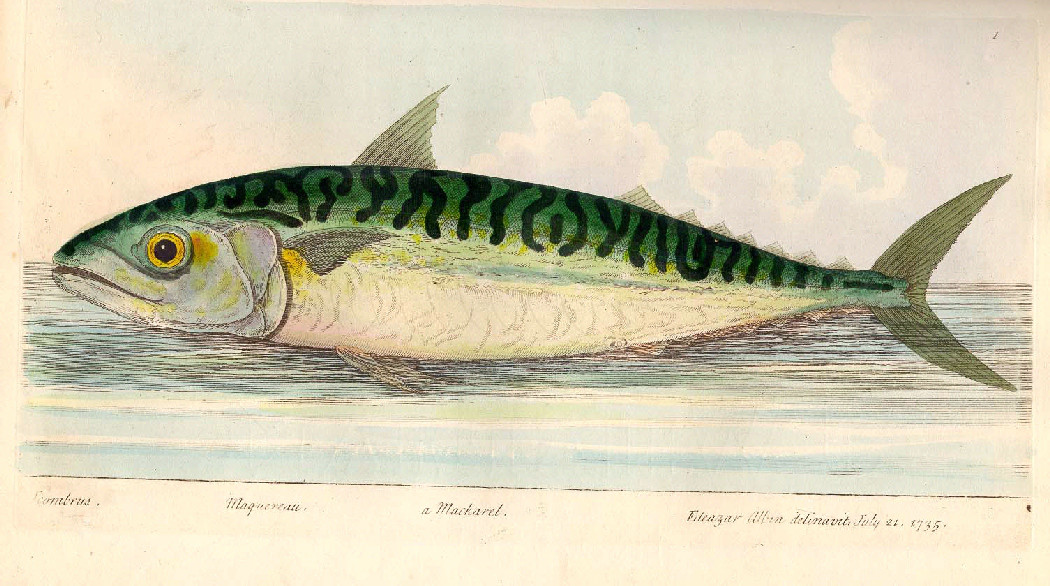
An 1835 illustration of the Atlantic mackerel.

The Atlantic mackerel has an elongate, fusiform body with a long, pointed snout. The eyes are large and covered by an adipose eyelid, while the teeth are small, sharp, and conical. Scales are also small, with the exceptions of those immediately posterior to the head and around the pectoral fins. These small scales give the Atlantic mackerel a velvet-like feel. The two dorsal fins are large and spaced far apart. The second dorsal fin is typically followed by 5 dorsal finlets, though it can have 4 or 6. The anal fin, which originates slightly behind the second dorsal fin, is similar to it in size and shape and is also succeeded by 5 finlets. The fish's body tapers to a slim caudal peduncle, the end of the fish to which the short but broad tail fin is attached. Its body is steel-blue dorsally with wavy black lines running perpendicular to the fish's length. The rest of its body is silvery-white to yellow and may have darker splotches. It can reach sizes of up to 60 cm (24 in) and has a common length of 30 cm (12 in). Its maximum published weight is 3.4 kg (7.5 lb).

== Distribution and habitat ==
The Atlantic mackerel's native range in the western Atlantic extends from Labrador, Canada to Cape Lookout, North Carolina. In the eastern Atlantic, it can be found from Iceland and Norway to as far south as Mauritania. It is also found in the Mediterranean, Black, and Baltic Seas. Its latitudinal range is 70°N-25°N and its longitudinal range is 77°W-42°E. Its preferred water temperature is above 8 °C (46 °F), but Atlantic mackerel are common in waters as cold as 7 °C (45 °F) and have been found, albeit rarely, in 4.5 °C (40.1 °F) waters. The Atlantic mackerel's common depth range extends from the surface to 200 m (660 ft), but individuals can be found as deep as 1,000 m (3,300 ft).

Atlantic mackerel are migratory fish, spending the spring and summer closer to shore about 32–161 km (20–100 mi) out, with juveniles moving closer in to shore than adults. Occasionally, fish will even enter harbors, and those that do are usually juveniles. In the fall and winter they move farther out and farther south to the warmer waters on the edge of the continental shelf. They first come in to land in North America in April at the southern end of their range, but are found along the coast through their entire range by July. They start moving back out to sea again in September and are completely gone from the coast by December. Food availability increases greatly during the summer, and fish reach a peak for fat tissue in August, a mere four months after their lowest point in April.

== Biology and ecology ==
The Atlantic mackerel is an active, fast-moving fish that must keep in constant motion to bring in enough oxygen to survive. It swims using short movements of the rear of its body and the caudal fin. Unlike other mackerel, Atlantic mackerel do not leap out of the water unless attempting to escape a predator. They form large schools, consisting of individuals of the same relative size, near the ocean surface during all seasons but winter. Because larger fish have a greater ratio of muscle mass to surface area, schools of larger fish are able to swim more quickly than schools made up of smaller individuals.

=== Feeding ===
When feeding on larger prey, schools tend to break down into shoals and individuals find food on their own. When consuming plankton, however, Atlantic mackerel form tight aggregations, open their mouths as wide as possible, and extend their operculums, swimming in a tightly packed school that acts like a series of miniature tow nets. Spaced only about the diameter of a single fish's mouth apart, this formation greatly reduces the ability of plankton to evade capture, as a plankton darting out of the way of one fish is likely to end up in the jaws of another. Copepods make up the majority of the Atlantic mackerel's diet, Calanus finmarchicus being the most abundant.

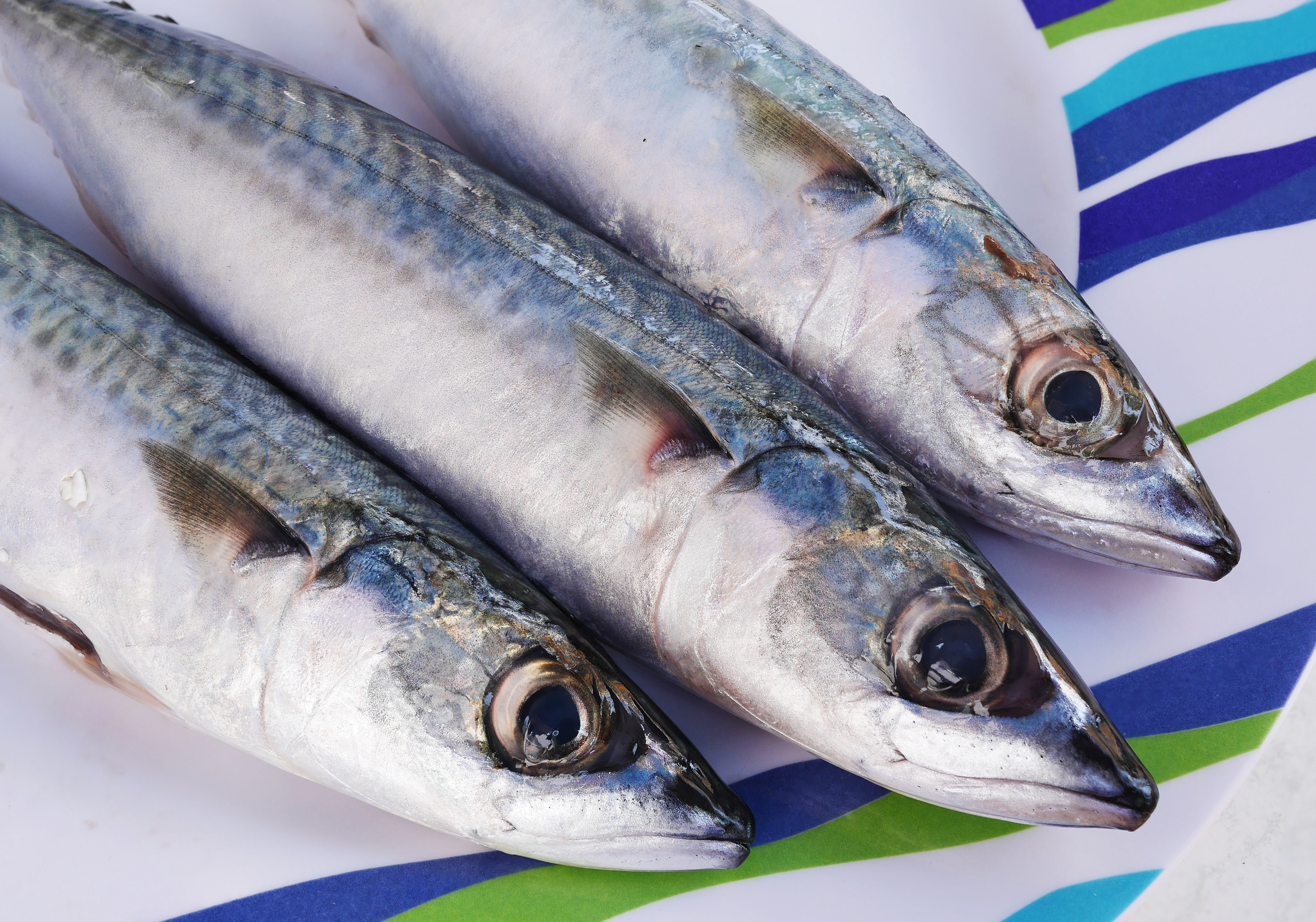
Atlantic mackerel close-up

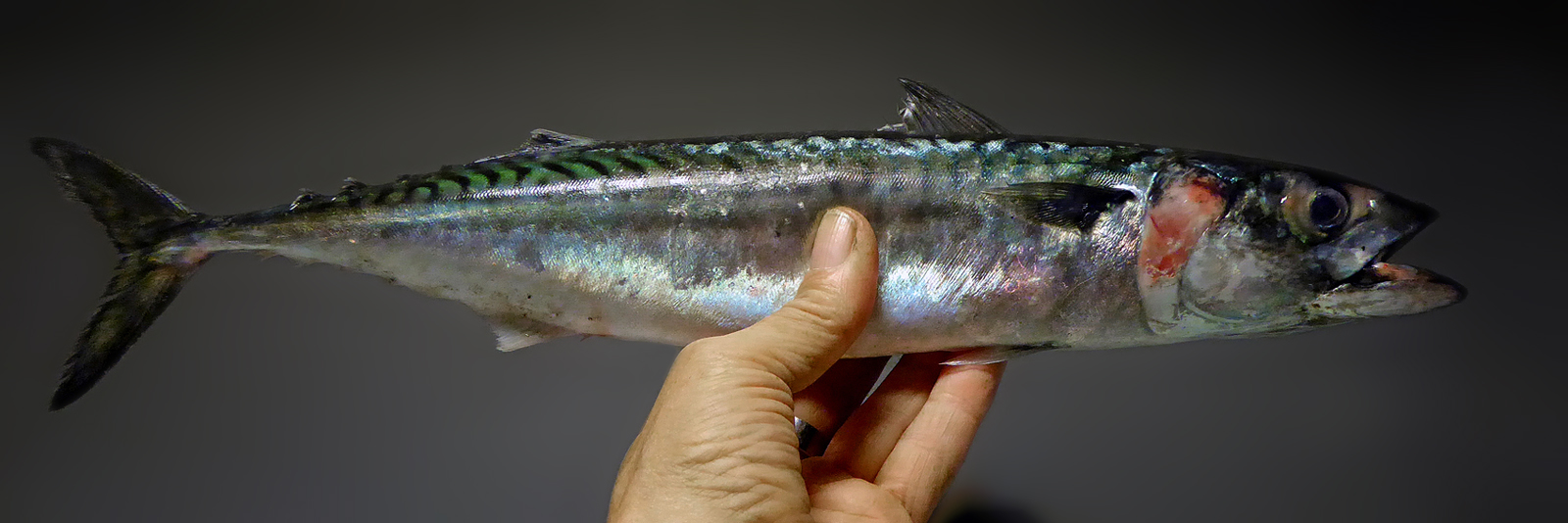
Atlantic mackerel.

=== Life history ===
Like other mackerels, reproduction in the Atlantic mackerel is oviparous. Spawning occurs day or night in the spring and summer months, primarily within 48 km (30 mi) of shore, though it can occur as far out as 130 km (81 mi). A single female can spawn as many as 450,000 eggs in a spawning season. Eggs mature in batches over the course of a week and are pelagic once released, remaining within 15–25 m (49–82 ft) of the surface. Time to hatching is dependent on the water temperature, and ranges from 2 days at 21 °C (70 °F) to 8.5 days at 10 °C (50 °F). Most eggs are spawned in waters 9–12 °C (48–54 °F) in temperature, and as such the majority of eggs hatch in about a week. Eggs are anywhere from 1.0–1.3 mm (0.039–0.051 in) in size, trending towards smaller as the spawning season goes on. Larvae undergo three developmental stages: the yolk sac stage, the larval stage, and the post-larval stage. Larvae are 3 mm (0.12 in) when they hatch and feed on the yolk sac for about 5 days. During the larval stage, which lasts about a month, larvae grow to 10 mm (0.39 in) in length. They are largely incapable of swimming, instead floating with the current. During the post-larval stage, which occurs over the next 40 days and during which the fish reaches 50 mm (2.0 in) in length, it swims to the surface at night and down to deeper waters during the day. At the end of the post-larval stage, juveniles resemble an adult mackerel in all but size. Schooling behavior occurs around this time.

Sexual maturity is reached at around 2 years of age, though some fish may reproduce a season earlier or a season later. Though some fish are sexually mature at 25 cm (9.8 in) in length, even by 34 cm (13 in) only about half of females will be ready to reproduce. At 37 cm (15 in), 90% of fish are capable of reproduction. An Atlantic mackerel can live for up to 17 years and attain a length of 60 cm (24 in) and a weight of 3.4 kg (7.5 lb).

== Human interaction ==
Atlantic mackerel, raw
Nutritional value per 100 g (3.5 oz)
- Energy: 858 kJ (205 kcal)
- Carbohydrates: 0 g
- Fat: 14 g
- Protein: 19 g
Vitamins and minerals
Vitamins	Quantity %DV^{†}
Vitamin A equiv.	6% 50 μg
Choline	12% 65 mg
Vitamin D	80% 643 IU
Minerals	Quantity %DV^{†}
Calcium	1% 12 mg
Iron	9% 1.63 mg
Magnesium	18% 76 mg
Phosphorus	17% 217 mg
Potassium	10% 314 mg
Zinc	6% 0.63 mg
- Other constituents: Quantity
- Water: 64 g
- ^{†}Percentages estimated using US recommendations for adults, except for potassium, which is estimated based on expert recommendation from the National Academies.

Global capture production of Atlantic mackerel (Scomber scombrus) in million tonnes from 1950 to 2022, as reported by the FAO

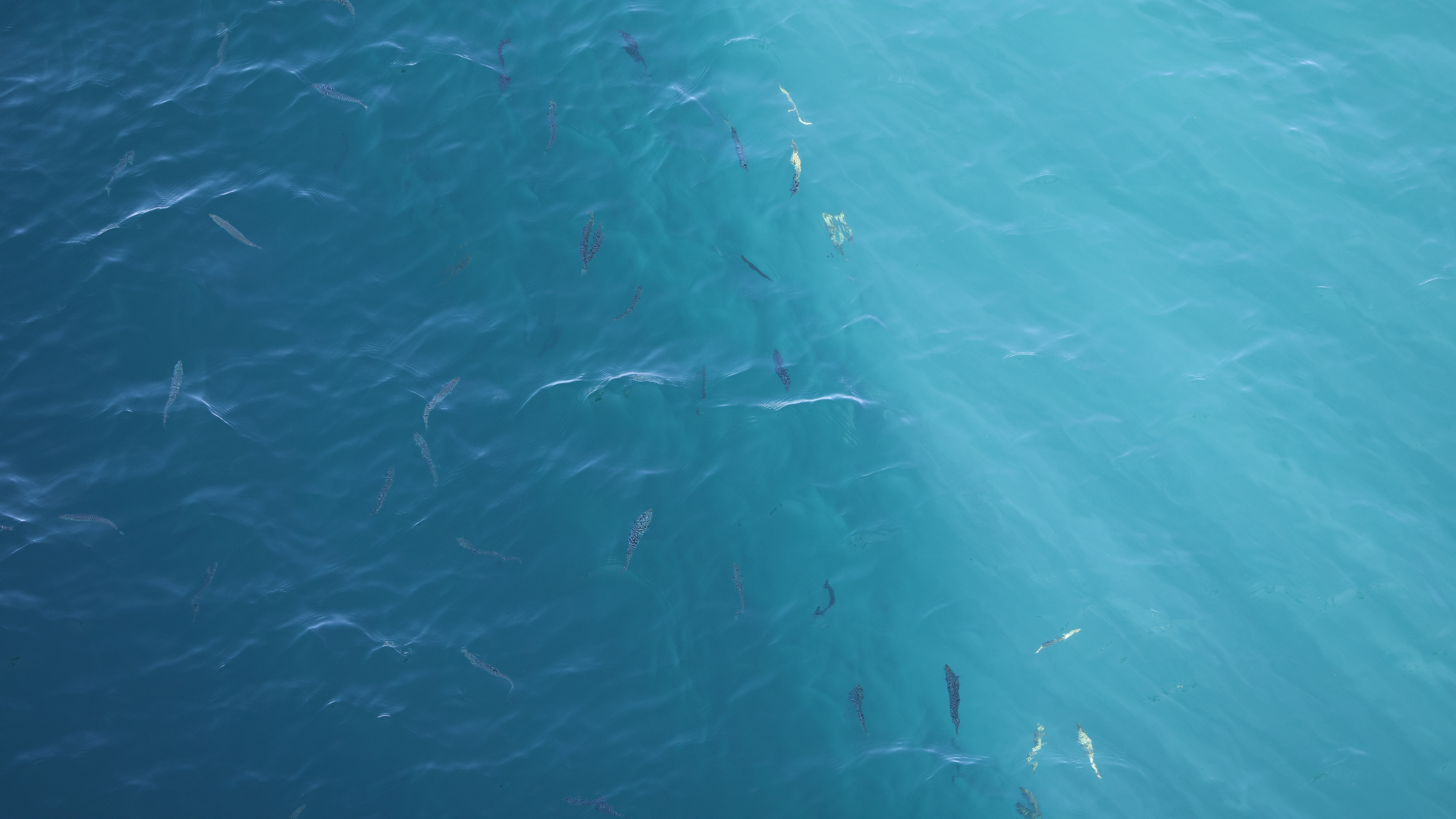
School of mackarel in the shade of a wind turbine at sea

The Atlantic mackerel is of commercial importance to many Atlantic fisheries, which catch it with purse seines, trawls, gill and trammel nets, and trolling lines. Global annual catch is typically in the range of 1 million tonnes, though a 50% spike in 2014 put this number at nearly 1.5 million tonnes. The United Kingdom and Norway bring in the most Atlantic mackerel, with annual catches coming in at over 166,000 tonnes and 160,000 tonnes respectively. In 2022 alone, Norwegian fisheries exported an estimated 6.3 billion Norwegian Kroner worth of the Atlantic mackerel. The majority of the mackerel caught by Norwegian fisheries is exported to countries including China, Japan, South Korea, and Vietnam. There are three stocks in the eastern Atlantic: one in the south, one in the west, and another in the North Sea. There are two populations in the Mediterranean, one in the east and one in the west. In the western Atlantic there are two stocks, one in the north and one in the south, for which assessments are, according to the IUCN, "highly uncertain".

=== As food ===
Atlantic mackerel outer meat is red meat while inner meat is white, with a strong taste desirable to some consumers. They are sold fresh, frozen, smoked, salted, filleted, or as steaks. The fish is extremely high in oil content, vitamin B_{6}, vitamin B_{12}, selenium, niacin, and omega 3, a class of fatty acids, containing nearly twice as much of the latter per unit weight as salmon. Unlike the King and Spanish species, Northern Atlantic mackerel are very low in mercury, and can be eaten at least twice a week according to United States Environmental Protection Agency guidelines.

The remarkably high omega-3 and other unsaturated fatty acid concentration of the Atlantic mackerel makes it an excellent source of essential fatty acids, even when compared against the closely related Pacific chub mackerel, which is also recognised for its high omega-3 content. In the Government of Japan ministry's food composition tables, the Atlantic mackerel's fat content is recorded as 26.8 grams per 100 grams of edible raw fish compared to 16.8 grams for its Pacific cousin. Similarly, the tables list a combined 4,400 mg of EPA and DHA per 100 grams of Atlantic mackerel, notably higher than the 1,660 mg in the Pacific chub mackerel, with higher amounts also listed for other omega-3 fats such as DPA, ALA, SDA and ETA. The differences recorded in these tables between the total omega-3 and omega-6 contents correspond to an omega-3 to omega-6 ratio of approximately 10.3:1 for the Atlantic mackerel, and 4.9:1 for the Pacific chub mackerel, respectively. The Atlantic mackerel's total fat content can vary substantially by catch season.

=== Conservation ===
Despite its commercial status, the Atlantic mackerel was assessed to be of Least Concern by the IUCN in 2011. Its abundance and extensive range combined with a cyclical increase/decrease in catch mean that it is not currently in danger of going extinct. The IUCN did recommend careful monitoring, however, especially as the effects of climate change may impact population size and distribution. In the northeastern Atlantic, several countries impose minimum landing sizes. In the European Union this size is 18 cm (7.1 in), Ukraine 15 cm (5.9 in), Turkey 20 cm (7.9 in), Romania 23 cm (9.1 in), and Canada 26.8 cm (10.6 in).

Local fisheries have been affected by fishing pressure, such as in Canada where commercial fisheries drove Atlantic mackerel to historic population lows in 2021. This led to the species being listed as in the "Critical Zone", a term used to define a population with dangerously low reproductive abilities, and therefore it being banned from commercial fishing in Canadian waters (with some exceptions). Since then the Canadian population has recovered, but is not yet in the "Healthy Zone" that would allow commercial fishing once more.

=== Symbol ===
The Spanish word for mackerel (caballa) is a colloquial demonym for the people of Ceuta, Spain.
