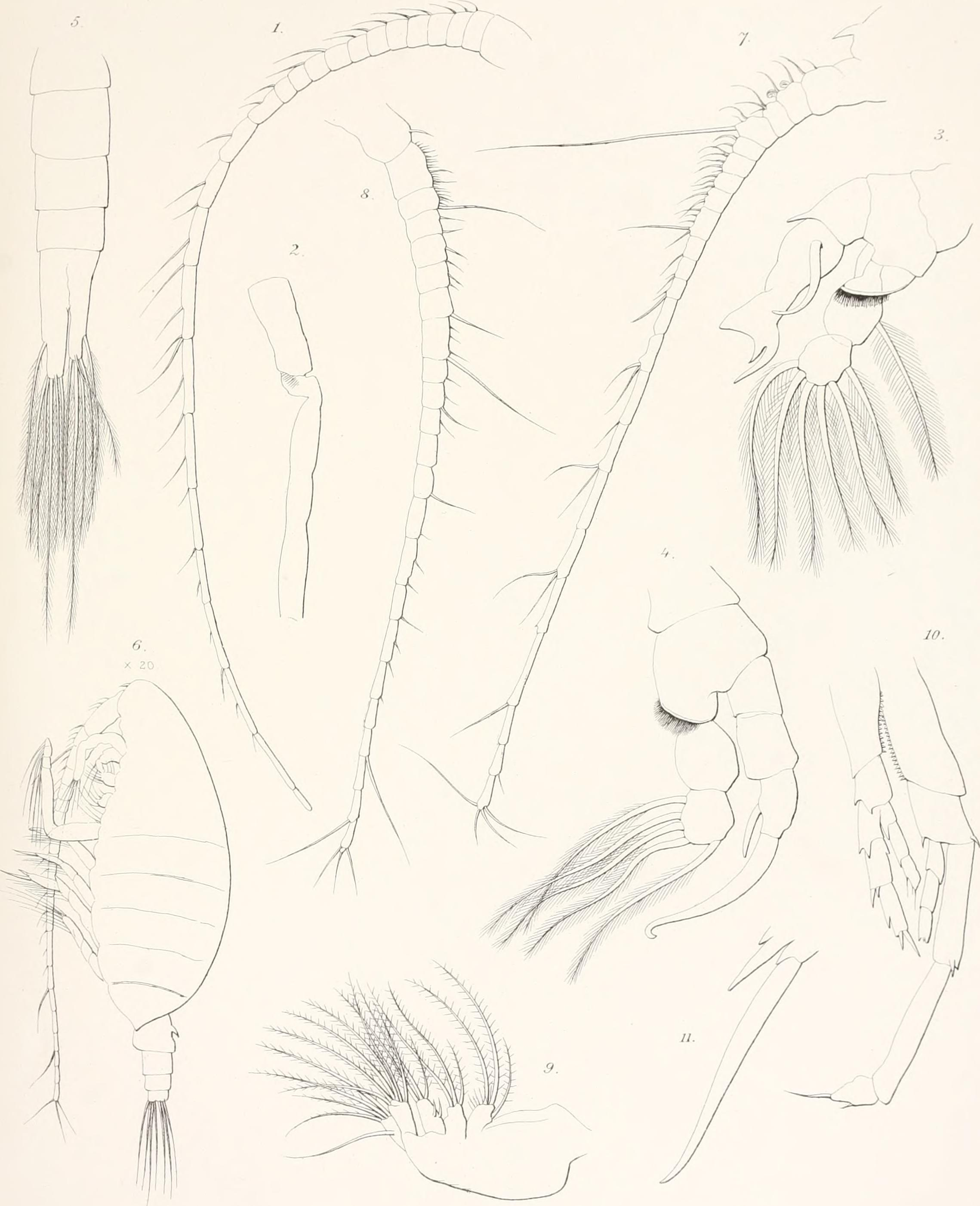

Scientific classification
- Kingdom: Animalia
- Phylum: Arthropoda
- Clade: Pancrustacea
- Class: Copepoda
- Order: Calanoida
- Family: Calanidae
- Genus: Calanus
- Species: C. propinquus

Binomial name
- Calanus propinquus Brady, 1883

= Calanus propinquus =

Species of crustacean

Calanus propinquus is a copepod found in Antarctica, and the surrounding waters.

== Description ==
The female averages about 5.3 millimetres (0.21 in) in length, whereas the male has an average of about 5.1 millimetres (0.20 in). The female usually ranges between around 4.8 and 6.0 millimetres (0.19 and 0.24 in), and the male ranges from about 4.8 to 5.3 millimetres (0.19 to 0.21 in).

== Distribution ==
C. propinquus is found off Antarctica, southern Africa, and southern South America.

== Ecology ==
=== Life cycle and reproduction ===
Reproduction occurs from October to March. In February, the population of C. propinquus greatly increases. During this time, the population is mostly concentrated in the top 150 metres (490 ft) of the sea. The next month, the population shifts, with stages I through III found from sea level to 25 metres (82 ft) in depth. The females, on the other hand, are usually found deeper than 500 metres (1,600 ft). In the Southern Hemisphere autumn, some stage III through V copepodites migrate to overwinter below depths of 200 metres (660 ft) (probably in diapause). Most of these copepodites, however, stay at the surface, overwintering in an active state. During October and November, most of the population is found between 100 and 500 metres (330 and 1,640 ft) of depth.

The lipid content of this species changes throughout its lifecycle. The highest concentration of lipids are found in adults, with lipids making up about 40%, on average, of the dry weight of females during the summer. It has the highest lipid content during the autumn, and the lowest during the spring. These stores decrease as its gonads develop. Most of the accumulated lipids are triglycerides, contrasting with other calanoid copepods that primarily use wax esters. This is partially achieved through the elongation of 11-Eicosenoic acid into erucic acid, which serves to concentrate the energy found. C. propinquue primarily uses triglycerides likely because most individuals are active during winter. The percentage of lipids that are triglycerides increases as the copepod ages; about 42% of the lipids in stage II copepodites are triglycerides, whereas in females, this increases to about 91% of the total lipid content.
