= Calanus sinicus =

Scientific classification
- Domain: Eukaryota
- Kingdom: Animalia
- Phylum: Arthropoda
- Class: Copepoda
- Order: Calanoida
- Family: Calanidae
- Genus: Calanus
- Species: C. sinicus

Binomial name
- Calanus sinicus Brodsky, 1962

Species of crustacean

Calanus sinicus is a copepod found in the northwest Pacific.

== Description ==
The female C. sinicus generally ranges from about 2.1 to 3.6 millimetres (0.083 to 0.142 in). The male generally ranges between about 2 and 3.5 millimetres (0.079 and 0.138 in). For adults and copepodite stages IV and above, lower temperatures result in longer prosomes.

== Distribution ==
C. sinicus is found in the northwest Pacific, off of the east coast of Asia to the South China Sea.

== Ecology ==
=== Life cycle and reproduction ===
C. sinicus reproduces throughout the year. There are generally two peaks in reproduction. In the southern Yellow Sea, these peaks occur from May to July and from November to January. These peaks occur when the temperatures throughout the water column fall into its preferred temperature range of 10 to 23 °C (50 to 73 °F). It can tolerate ranges between 1 and 27 °C (34 and 81 °F) for limited periods of time, and can reproduce between about 5 and 23 °C (41 and 73 °F). It is likely that there are two different reproductive strategies carried out during spring and autumn. In the first reproductive period, during spring, the average prosome length is high, which allows it to produce more eggs around the time of the phytoplankton bloom. During autumn, on the other hand, accumulated energy is likely used to finance reproduction. Spawning occurs at the surface during the night and dawn, with peak spawning occurring during the latter. The depth at which eggs are found varies seasonally; a study in the Sea of Japan found that eggs generally occurred at about 12 metres (39 ft) in depth in August and September, about 25 metres (82 ft) in November, about 30 metres (98 ft) in June, and about 41 metres (135 ft) in March. The depth at which eggs are found may be related to the avoidance of cannibalism by late copepodite stages and adults, as, in some cases, a lack of overlap between the vertical distribution of eggs and potential cannibals has been observed. The eggs hatch into nauplii in about one day.

From August onwards, the population declines and its distribution shrinks. During this time, it is found in cooler waters; it oversummers, for example, in the Yellow Sea Cold Bottom Water, where temperatures are usually below 10 °C (50 °F). Adults, stage V copepodites, and some stage IV copepodites are found in the colder bottom waters, whereas copepodite stages I through III are found in the middle layer, where temperatures are between about 10 and 20 °C (50 and 68 °F). During this time, it still feeds actively.

== Relationship with humans ==
C. sinicus is an important food of anchovies, sandeels, and sardines, which are important commercially.
