= Minimum depth of occurrence =

Shallowest depth in the ocean at which a species is observed

The minimum depth of occurrence (MDO) is the shallowest depth in the ocean at which a species is observed. Because some aberrant individuals often can be found far outside their typical depth range, the MDO is sometimes defined as the depth below which 90% of individuals are observed or captured. In practice, observations of pelagic organisms are limited to trawling at a known depth, scuba diving observations, or use of underwater vehicles such as ROVs or AUVs. A species' MDO can change throughout ontogeny if the species is an ontogenetic vertical migrator; that is, it changes its habitat depth as it matures (typically descending deeper with increased maturity). Additionally, some species undergo diel vertical migration in which they migrate vertically each day. In these taxa, the MDO is defined based on their shallowest depth during their diel migration.

== Relation to metabolic rate ==
For pelagic visually oriented organisms such as cephalopods, fishes, and crustaceans, metabolic rate decreases with increasing minimum depth of occurrence (MDO). In other words, the shallower an organism ever has to go, the higher its metabolic rate must be. This is because inhabiting shallow waters requires locomotory ability to evade visually-hunting predators and function well as a visual predator on one's own prey. The visual-interactions hypothesis is the idea that many pelagic animals in the ocean have decreasing activity levels and metabolic rates with increasing minimum-depth of occurrence (MDO) due to decreasing light levels. According to this hypothesis, high metabolic rates are not an asset but a high cost to an organism, unless that high metabolic rate is necessary for survival. In well-lit euphotic waters, a high metabolic rate is advantageous because it helps an organism both avoid visually hunting predators and perform well as a visual predator itself. At depths below the euphotic zone, however, the efficiency of visual predation is substantially lessened, and thus high metabolic rates are no longer strongly selected.

In addition to light levels, other factors (notably food limitation, oxygen, temperature, and pressure) are sometimes ascribed to be the driver of low metabolic rates in the deep sea. It has been well demonstrated, however, that the decrease in metabolic rate with depth is indeed due to visual predation rather than other factors. Firstly, the decline in metabolic rate is only observed in visually hunting predators such as most fishes, cephalopods, and crustaceans. Gelatinous zooplankton such as chaetognaths and jellies, for example, are semi-transparent and are not visual hunters themselves and thus their metabolic rate is light-independent. Seibel et al. (2007) assessed the merits of these factors on impacting the relationship between metabolic rate and MDO and found decreasing light to be the dominating factor. Their evidence was as follows:

- Metabolic rate is only related to habitat depth in visually orienting animals where light impacts their responses to prey and predators.
- Food availability 1000 m below eutrophic surface waters can be similar to food availability in surface oligotrophic waters. Despite similar food supply, metabolic rate is still lower at depth. Also, decreasing metabolic rate with depth often tapers off near the bathypelagic zone (1000 m) but food availability continues to decrease an order of magnitude with each kilometer of depth.
- Oxygen does not decline uniformly with depth. There are normoxic and deep habitats where taxa still have low metabolic rates.
- Temperature does not decrease with depth in Antarctica, but metabolic rates of Antarctic organisms still decrease with depth.
- Pressure gradients with depth do not affect the metabolic rates of gelatinous and benthic taxa.

The relationship between MDO and metabolic rate is similar for both aerobic and anaerobic potential. While hiding is a good primary defense, if this fails, the organisms still need to be able to quickly escape from a predator. Thus, anaerobic potential must stay high in the high predatory-risk epipelagic, but can drop off in the less risky darker depths.
