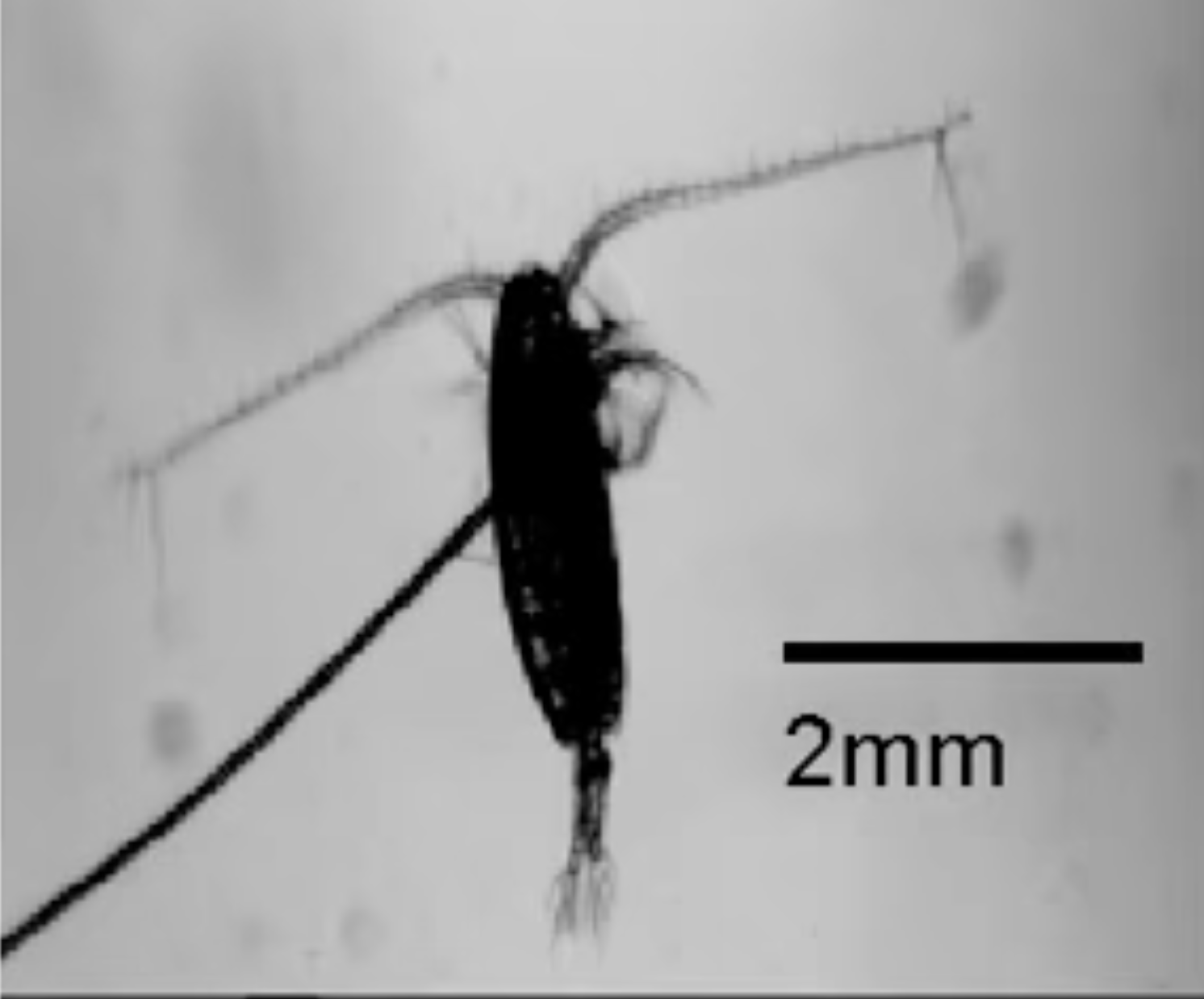
- Calanus helgolandicus

Scientific classification
- Domain: Eukaryota
- Kingdom: Animalia
- Phylum: Arthropoda
- Class: Copepoda
- Order: Calanoida
- Family: Calanidae
- Genus: Calanus
- Species: C. helgolandicus

Binomial name
- Calanus helgolandicus (Claus, 1863)

Synonyms
- Cetochilus helgolandicus Claus, 1863; Calanus syunpuensis Kurasige, 1933

= Calanus helgolandicus =

Species of crustacean

Calanus helgolandicus is a copepod found in the Atlantic, from the North Sea south to the western coast of Africa. The female has an average size of about 2.9 millimetres (0.11 in) and the male has an average size of about 2.7 millimetres (0.11 in).

== Description ==
The female has an average size of about 2.9 millimetres (0.11 in) and the male has an average size of about 2.7 millimetres (0.11 in).

== Distribution ==
Calanus helgolandicus is found in the Atlantic, from the North Sea south to the western coast of Africa. It can also be found in the Mediterranean and Black Sea. Because of increasing temperatures due to climate change, its range is expanding northward. It is usually found in waters between 9 and 20 °C (48 and 68 °F) in temperature, with maximum abundance being between 13 and 17 °C (55 and 63 °F).

== Ecology ==
=== Life cycle and reproduction ===
Calanus helgolandicus overwinters as a stage V copepodite. However, only those with enough energy stores can overwinter; the rest stay at the surface. In fact, it has been observed that overwintering copepods are heavier than those that stay at the surface. During this overwintering process, the copepodites moult into adult females. After moulting, the females breed the next spring. In the absence of food during this time, they can lay their first few eggs from accumulated energy stores. Although this is true, it is mainly an income breeder, reproducing using recently gained energy. It has a maximum of about three generations per year. In the central North Sea, it is most abundant during spring and autumn. It is likely that warmer temperatures can facilitate egg production for more of the year.

=== Feeding ===
Calanus helgolandicus is a planktonic herbivore, although it has been shown to eat both dead diatoms and faeces from other members of its species. This copepod seems to select particles based on their structure; marine snow (which is unstructured), is rejected, whereas dead diatoms and objects such as polystyrene (when given as beads 30 micrometers in diameter) are accepted as food. Faecal pellets are generally not accepted in whole (possibly due to the difficulty in handling very large particles). When faecal pellets are rejected, they are generally damaged. When the pellets are fragmented (corporhexy), they are generally ingested with alternate food, and the "loosening" (coprochaly) of a pellet can precede the removal (and likely ingestion) of the peritrophic membrane, which has bacteria and other organisms which increase its nutritional value. Its grazing (the efficiency of the removal of food from seawater) and ingestion rates (the actual amount of food eaten) increase with increasing body weight, however, as body weight increases, the grazing and ingestion rates per unit of body weight decrease.
