= Eupelmus nihoaensis =

Conservation status
- Imperiled (NatureServe)

Scientific classification
- Domain: Eukaryota
- Kingdom: Animalia
- Phylum: Arthropoda
- Class: Insecta
- Order: Hymenoptera
- Family: Eupelmidae
- Genus: Eupelmus
- Species: E. nihoaensis

Binomial name
- Eupelmus nihoaensis Timberlake

Species of parasitic wasp

Eupelmus nihoaensis, the Nihoan Eupelmus wasp, is a species of parasitic wasp endemic to the island of Nīhoa, Hawaiian Islands. The species was described by Philip Hunter Timberlake in 1926. It is listed as "Imperiled" by NatureServe, for habitat loss, climate change, and other factors that are affecting the island of Nīhoa, are affecting the species greatly.
