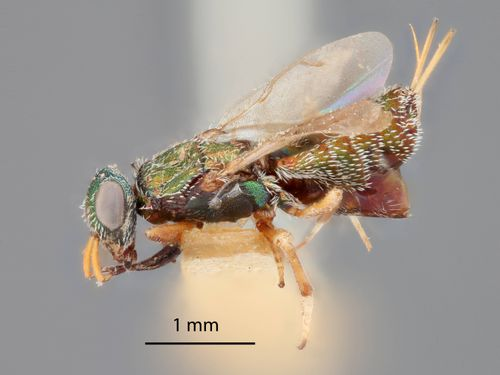

Scientific classification
- Kingdom: Animalia
- Phylum: Arthropoda
- Class: Insecta
- Order: Hymenoptera
- Family: Eupelmidae
- Genus: Eupelmus
- Species: E. vuilleti

Binomial name
- Eupelmus vuilleti (Crawford, 1913)

= Eupelmus vuilleti =

Species of wasp

Eupelmus vuilleti is a species of parasitic wasp found in Burkina Faso and Togo. It is a solitary ectoparasite of bruchids. The female is about 3 millimetres (0.12 in) in length and is green in color with bronzy tints, while the male averages 2.25 millimetres (0.089 in) in length and is green with a brassy tint.

This wasp is synovigenic. It is also an income breeder in terms of sugars, but a capital breeder in terms of lipids.
