= Eupelmus orientalis =

Scientific classification
- Kingdom: Animalia
- Phylum: Arthropoda
- Class: Insecta
- Order: Hymenoptera
- Family: Eupelmidae
- Genus: Eupelmus
- Species: E. orientalis

Binomial name
- Eupelmus orientalis (Crawford, 1913)

Synonyms
- Bruchocida orientalis Crawford, 1913

Species of wasp

Eupelmus orientalis is a species of Old-World parasitoid wasp. It attacks a range of insects, including bruchid beetle larvae in legume seeds. The species may be important in the control of Callosobruchus maculatus, a pest that consumes cowpea and other legume seeds.
