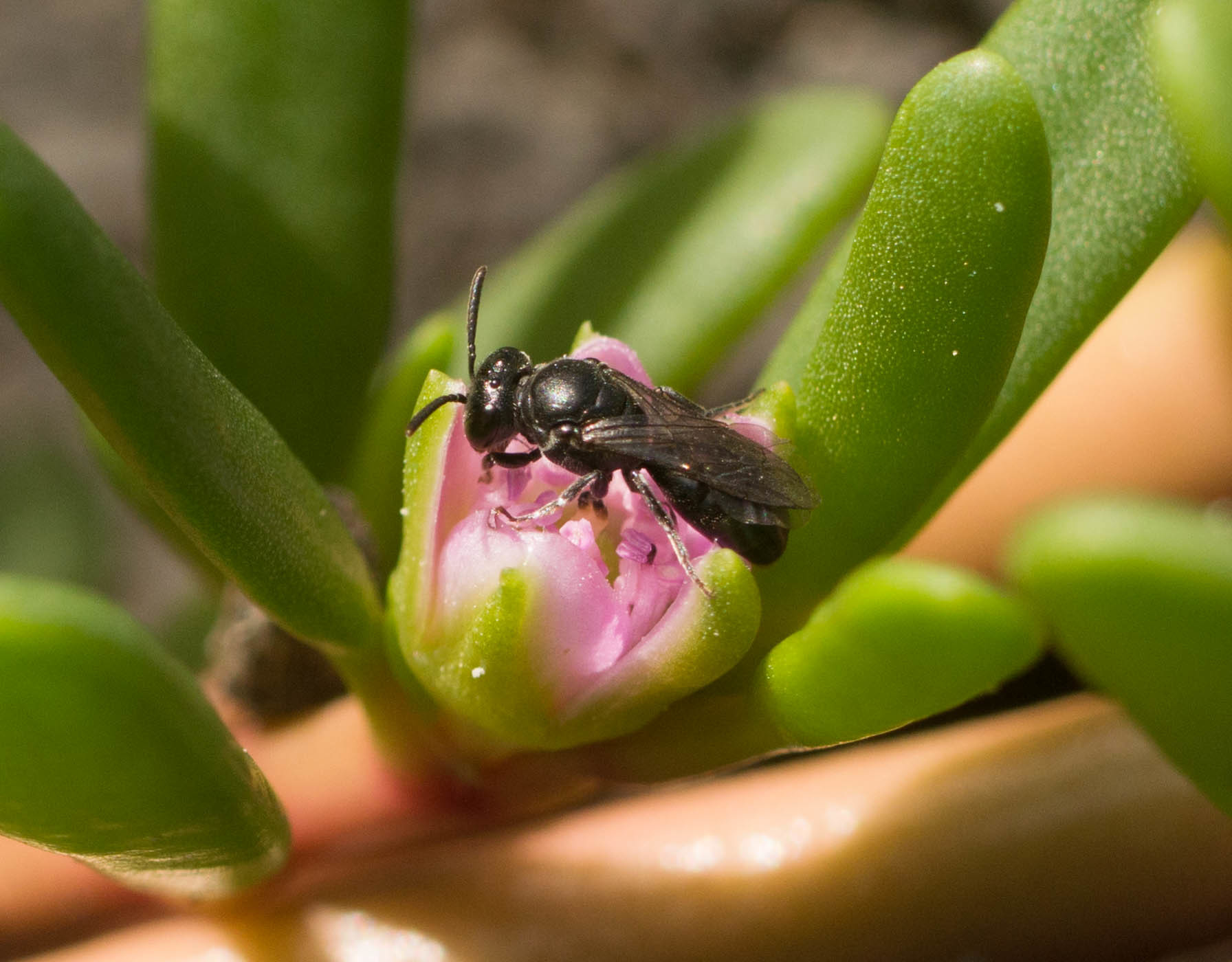

Conservation status
- Endangered (ESA)

Scientific classification
- Kingdom: Animalia
- Phylum: Arthropoda
- Clade: Pancrustacea
- Class: Insecta
- Order: Hymenoptera
- Family: Colletidae
- Genus: Hylaeus
- Species: H. anthracinus

Binomial name
- Hylaeus anthracinus (Smith, 1853)

Synonyms
- Prosopis anthracina Smith, 1853; Prosopis rugiventris Blackburn, 1886

= Hylaeus anthracinus =

Species of bee

Hylaeus anthracinus is a species of bee, also known by the common name anthricinan yellow-faced bee. It is endemic to Hawaii and known from only 16 populations. In September 2016, along with six other Hawaiian Hylaeus species, H. anthracinus was listed for protection under the United States Endangered Species Act. This marked a first listing for any bee species in the US.

== Description ==
Hylaeus anthracinus is colored black and of medium size. Its legs are black and the wings are clearish. Males have a large facial yellow spot whereas females are completely black.

== Distribution and habitat ==
Hylaeus anthracinus is found in coastal and lowland dry forest. Populations are now only known from the islands of Hawaii, Kahoolawe, Maui, Molokai and Oahu. Threats to the species include habitat degradation by nonnative animals and plants, predation by nonnative insects, fires and climate change.
