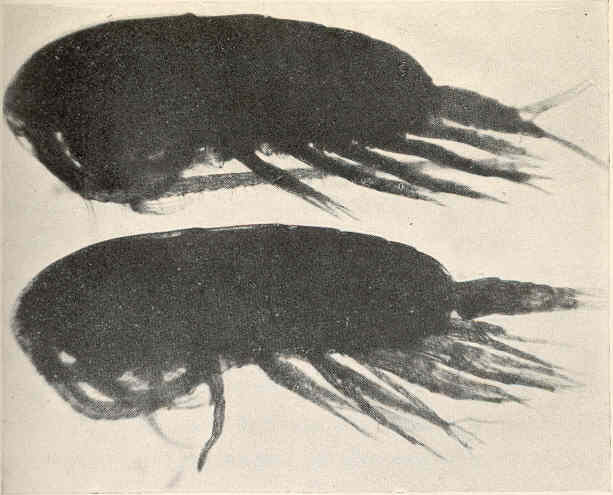

Scientific classification
- Kingdom: Animalia
- Phylum: Arthropoda
- Clade: Pancrustacea
- Class: Copepoda
- Order: Calanoida
- Family: Calanidae
- Genus: Calanus
- Species: C. finmarchicus

Binomial name
- Calanus finmarchicus (Gunnerus, 1770)

Synonyms
- List: Calanus arietis Templeton, 1836; Calanus borealis Lubbock, 1854; Calanus elegans Lubbock, 1854; Calanus mundus Dana, 1849; Calanus perspicax Dana, 1852; Calanus quinqueannulatus Krøyer, 1842; Calanus recticornis Dana, 1849; Calanus sanguineus Dana, 1849; Calanus septentrionalis (Goodsir, 1843); Calanus spitzbergensis Krøyer, 1843; Cetochilus finmarchicus (Gunner, 1765); Cetochilus septentrionalis Goodsir, 1843; Cyclops finmarchicus Müller O.F., 1776; Monoculus finmarchicus Gunner, 1765

= Calanus finmarchicus =

Species of crustacean

Calanus finmarchicus is a species of copepod and a component of the zooplankton, which is found in enormous amounts in the northern Atlantic Ocean.

== Distribution and ecology ==
Calanus finmarchicus is most commonly found in the North Sea and the Norwegian Sea. It is also found throughout the colder waters of the North Atlantic, especially off the coast of Canada, in the Gulf of Maine, and all the way up to western and northern Svalbard.

Calanus finmarchicus is one of the most commonly found species of zooplankton in the subarctic waters of the North Atlantic. Sometimes confused with C. helgolandicus and C. glacialis, C. finmarchicus is a large planktonic copepod whose chief diet includes diatoms, dinoflagellates, and other microplanktonic organisms. In fact, some studies have shown that heterotrophic microplankton provide a "prey resource sufficient for net lipid synthesis as well as egg production". C. finmarchicus is a key component in the food web of the North Atlantic, providing sustenance for a variety of marine organisms including fish, shrimp, and whales.

Although the organism prefers these types of habitats, it has demonstrated that it is capable of surviving a wide range of environmental conditions. In terms of depth, C. finmarchicus can be found living anywhere from the ocean surface down to about 4,000 metres (13,000 ft) deep. It can also live in waters as cold as −2 °C (28 °F) and as warm as 22 °C (72 °F). Other environmental conditions and their ranges include salinity (18–36 pps), oxygen (1–9 mL/L), nitrate (0–45 μmol/L), phosphate (0–3 μmol/L) and silicate (1–181 μmol/L) levels.

Calanus finmarchicus primarily feeds on different forms of phytoplankton. This includes diatoms, dinoflagellates, ciliates, and other photosynthetic marine organisms. Some scientific evidence suggests that copepods like C. finmarchicus are feeding on microzooplankton as well.

Mesozooplankton are among the most important components of their regional food web. Several species of harvestable fish, including cod, herring and red fish (along with a plethora of other marine life) depend on C. finmarchicus for some form of nourishment. Scientists working in Canada estimate that 90%–100% of larval redfish prey on Calanus eggs in the Gulf of the St. Lawrence.

Calanus finmarchicus is especially important ecologically because it shows rapid responses to climate variability, including shifts in species' distribution and abundance, timing of life history events, and trophic relationships.

== Physiology ==
Calanus finmarchicus is considered to be a large copepod, being typically 2–4 millimetres (0.08–0.16 in) long. Copepods like C. finmarchicus represent a major part of dry weight (biomass) mesozooplankton in pelagic ecosystems. Calanus finmarchicus is high in protein and polyunsaturated omega-3 fatty acids.

Calanus finmarchicus has survived intense periods of climate change. During the last ice age (approx. 18,000 years ago), the species migrated north in order to maintain its large populations. The organism's overwintering strategy, known as diapause, gives it the ability to survive during long periods of food shortage, typical of temperate and high latitudes. During this six-month period of hibernation, many of these organisms will sink to depths of 500–2,500m in the ocean, where they remain at rest until the following spring when they awake and return to the surface waters to breed. Many scientists believe that C. finmarchicus use this strategy as a survival method by reducing physiological costs and predation risk. This ability leads scientists to believe that they may be able to track some of the current changes in climate using the habits of these planktonic organisms.

The overwintering strategy employed by C. finmarchicus helps it survive intense starving periods and plays a significant role in the organism's life cycle. During these starving periods C. finmarchicus has shown that it is able to maintain a consistent rate of egg production as well as a constant proportion of adenosine triphosphate (ATP) to carbon; granted their absolute amounts of carbon, nitrogen, and ATP vary significantly. Scientists look at these levels of ATP because they usually remain constant over a range of physiological conditions, making them useful indicators of biomass. Both egg production and ATP composition were previously thought to have varied directly with food availability on a linear scale. More recently, it has been shown that despite low concentrations of phytoplankton (one of the organism's primary food sources), C. finmarchicus maintained relatively high rates of egg production. In fact, these rates were strikingly similar to the egg production rates of those recorded in the lower St. Lawrence estuary, where the water had a much higher concentration of chlorophyll (indicating a larger presence of phytoplankton).

Adults reproduce almost exclusively in surface waters. Calanus eggs are typically 0.05 mm (0.0020 in) in diameter, and hatch in 2–3 days.

== See also ==
- Atlantic Mackerel
