= Diel vertical migration =

Pattern of daily vertical movement in many aquatic species

Daily migration of marine life between the twilight zone and the ocean surface – animation by NASA

Diel vertical migration (DVM), also known as diurnal vertical migration, is a pattern of movement used by some organisms, such as copepods, living in the ocean and in lakes. The adjective "diel" (IPA: /ˈdaɪ.əl/, /ˈdiː.əl/) comes from Latin: diēs, lit. 'day', and refers to a 24-hour period. The migration occurs when organisms move up to the uppermost layer of the water at night and return to the bottom of the daylight zone of the oceans or to the dense, bottom layer of lakes during the day. DVM is important to the functioning of deep-sea food webs and the biologically-driven sequestration of carbon.

In terms of biomass, DVM is the largest synchronous migration in the world. It is not restricted to any one taxon, as examples are known from crustaceans (copepods), molluscs (squid), and ray-finned fishes (trout).

The phenomenon may be advantageous for a number of reasons, most typically to access food and to avoid predators. It is triggered by various stimuli, the most prominent being changes in light-intensity, though evidence suggests that biological clocks are an underlying stimulus as well. While this mass migration is generally nocturnal, with the animals ascending from the depths at nightfall and descending at sunrise, the timing can alter in response to the different cues and stimuli that trigger it. Some unusual events impact vertical migration: DVM can be absent during the midnight sun in Arctic regions and vertical migration can occur suddenly during a solar eclipse. The phenomenon also demonstrates cloud-driven variations.

The common swift is an exception among birds in that it ascends and descends into high altitudes at dusk and dawn, similar to the vertical migration of aquatic organisms.

== Discovery ==
The phenomenon was first documented by French naturalist Georges Cuvier in 1817. He noted that daphnia, a type of plankton, appeared and disappeared according to a diurnal pattern.

During World War II the U.S. Navy was taking sonar readings of the ocean when they discovered the deep scattering layer (DSL). While performing sound propagation experiments, the University of California's Division of War Research (UCDWR) consistently had results of the echo-sounder that showed a distinct reverberation that they attributed to mid-water layer scattering agents. At the time, there was speculation that these readings may be attributed to enemy submarines.

Martin W. Johnson of Scripps Institution of Oceanography proposed a possible explanation. Working with the UCDWR, the Scripps researchers were able to confirm that the observed reverberations from the echo-sounder were in fact related to the diel vertical migration of marine animals. The DSL was caused by large, dense groupings of organisms, like zooplankton, that scattered the sonar to create a false or second bottom.

Once scientists started to do more research on what was causing the DSL, it was discovered that a large range of organisms were vertically migrating. Most types of plankton and some types of nekton have exhibited some type of vertical migration, although it is not always diel. These migrations may have substantial effects on mesopredators and apex predators by modulating the concentration and accessibility of their prey (e.g., impacts on the foraging behavior of pinnipeds).

== Types of vertical migration ==
=== Diel ===
This is the most common form of vertical migration. Organisms migrate on a daily basis through different depths in the water column. Migration usually occurs between shallow surface waters of the epipelagic zone and deeper mesopelagic zone of the ocean or hypolimnion zone of lakes. There are three recognized types of diel vertical migration:

==== Nocturnal vertical migration ====
In the most common form, nocturnal vertical migration, organisms ascend to the surface around dusk, remaining at the surface for the night, then migrating to depth again around dawn.

==== Reverse migration ====
Reverse migration occurs with organisms ascending to the surface at sunrise and remaining high in the water column throughout the day until descending with the setting sun.

==== Twilight diel vertical migration ====
Twilight diel vertical migration involves two separate migrations in a single 24-hour period, with the first ascent at dusk followed by a descent at midnight, often known as the "midnight sink". The second ascent to the surface and descent to the depths occurs at sunrise.

=== Seasonal ===
Organisms are found at different depths depending on what season it is. Seasonal changes to the environment may influence changes to migration patterns. Normal diel vertical migration occurs in species of foraminifera throughout the year in the polar regions; however, during the midnight sun, no differential light cues exist so they remain at the surface to feed upon the abundant phytoplankton, or to facilitate photosynthesis by their symbionts. This is not true for all species at all times, however. Zooplankton have been observed to resynchronize their migrations with the light of the moon during periods when the sun is not visible, and to stay in deeper waters when the moon is full.

Larger seasonally-migrating zooplankton such as overwintering copepods have been shown to transport a substantial amount of carbon to the deep ocean through a process known as the lipid pump. The lipid pump is a process that sequesters carbon (in the form of carbon-rich lipids) out of the surface ocean via the descent of copepods to the deep during autumn. These copepods accumulate these lipids during late summer and autumn before descending to the deep to overwinter in response to reduced primary production and harsh conditions at the surface. Furthermore, they rely on these lipid reserves that are metabolized for energy to survive through winter before ascending back to the surface in the spring, typically at the onset of a spring bloom.

=== Ontogenetic ===
Organisms spend different stages of their life cycle at different depths. There are often pronounced differences in migration patterns of adult female copepods, like Eurytemora affinis, which stay at depth with only a small upward movement at night, compared to the rest of its life stages which migrate over 10 meters (33 ft). In addition, there is a trend seen in other copepods, like Acartia spp. that have an increasing amplitude of their DVM seen with their progressive life stages. This is possibly due to increasing body size of the copepods and the associated risk of visual predators, like fish, as being larger makes them more noticeable.

== Vertical migration stimuli ==
There are two different types of factors that are known to play a role in vertical migration, endogenous and exogenous. Endogenous factors originate from the organism itself; sex, age, size, biological rhythms, etc. Exogenous factors are environmental factors acting on the organism such as light, gravity, oxygen, temperature, predator-prey interactions, etc.

=== Endogenous factors ===
==== Endogenous rhythm ====
Biological clocks are an ancient and adaptive sense of time innate to an organism that allows them to anticipate environmental changes and cycles so they are able to physiologically and behaviorally respond to the expected change.

Evidence of circadian rhythms controlling DVM, metabolism, and even gene expression have been found in copepod species, Calanus finmarchicus. These copepods were shown to continue to exhibit these daily rhythms of vertical migration in the laboratory setting even in constant darkness, after being captured from an actively migrating wild population.

An experiment was done at the Scripps Institution of Oceanography which kept organisms in column tanks with light/dark cycles. A few days later the light was changed to a constant low light and the organisms still displayed diel vertical migration. This suggests that some type of internal response was causing the migration.

==== Clock gene expression ====
Many organisms, including the copepod C. finmarchicus, have genetic material devoted to maintaining their biological clock. The expression of these genes varies temporally with the expression significantly increasing following dawn and dusk at times of greatest vertical migration. These findings may indicate they work as a molecular stimulus for vertical migration.

==== Body size ====
The relative body size of an organism has been found to affect DVM. Bull trout express daily and seasonal vertical migrations with smaller individuals always staying at a deeper layer than the larger individuals. This is most likely due to a predation risk, but is dependent on the individuals own size such that smaller animals may be more inclined to remain at depth.

=== Exogenous factors ===
==== Light ====
"Light is the most common and critical cue for vertical migration". However, as of 2010, there had not been sufficient research to determine which aspect of the light field was responsible. As of 2020, research has suggested that both light intensity and spectral composition of light are important.

==== Temperature ====
Organisms will migrate to a water depth with temperatures that best suit the organisms needs, for example some fish species migrate to warmer surface waters in order to aid digestion. Temperature changes can influence swimming behavior of some copepods. In the presence of a strong thermocline some zooplankton may be inclined to pass through it, and migrate to the surface waters, though this can be very variable even in a single species. The marine copepod, Calanus finmarchicus, will migrate through gradients with temperature differences of 6 °C over George's Bank; whereas, in the North Sea they are observed to remain below the gradient.

==== Salinity ====
Changes in salinity may promote organism to seek out more suitable waters if they happen to be stenohaline or unequipped to handle regulating their osmotic pressure. Areas that are impacted by tidal cycles accompanied by salinity changes, estuaries for example, may see vertical migration in some species of zooplankton. Salinity has also been proposed as a factor that regulates the biogeochemical impact of diel vertical migration.

==== Pressure ====
Pressure changes have been found to produce differential responses that result in vertical migration. Many zooplankton will react to increased pressure with positive phototaxis, a negative geotaxis, and/or a kinetic response that results in ascending in the water column. Likewise, when there is a decrease in pressure, the zoo plankton respond by passively sinking or active downward swimming to descend in the water column.

==== Predator kairomones ====
A predator might release a chemical cue which could cause its prey to vertically migrate away. This may stimulate the prey to vertically migrate to avoid said predator. The introduction of a potential predator species, like a fish, to the habitat of diel vertical migrating zooplankton has been shown to influence the distribution patterns seen in their migration. For example, a study used Daphnia and a fish that was too small to prey on them (Lebistus reticulatus), found that with the introduction of the fish to the system the Daphnia remained below the thermocline, where the fish was not present. This demonstrates the effects of kairomones on Daphnia DVM.

==== Tidal patterns ====
Some organisms have been found to move with the tidal cycle. A study looked at the abundance of a species of small shrimp, Acetes sibogae, and found that they tended to move further higher in the water column and in higher numbers during flood tides than during ebb tides experiences at the mouth of an estuary. It is possible that varying factors with the tides may be the true trigger for the migration rather than the movement of the water itself, like the salinity or minute pressure changes.

== Reasons for vertical migration ==
There are many hypotheses as to why organisms would vertically migrate, and several may be valid at any given time.

=== Predator avoidance ===
The universality of DVM suggests that there is some powerful common factor behind it. The connection between available light and DVM has led researchers to theorize that organisms may stay in deeper, darker areas during the day to avoid being eaten by predators who depend on light to see and catch their prey. While the ocean's surface provides an abundance of food, it may be safest for many species to visit it at night.

Light-dependent predation by fish is a common pressure that causes DVM behavior in zooplankton and krill. A given body of water may be viewed as a risk gradient whereby the surface layers are riskier to reside in during the day than deep water, and as such promotes varied longevity among zooplankton that settle at different daytime depths. Indeed, in many instances it is advantageous for zooplankton to migrate to deep waters during the day to avoid predation and come up to the surface at night to feed. For example, the northern krill Meganyctiphanes norvegica undergoes diel vertical migration to avoid planktivorous fish.

Patterns among migrators seem to support the predator avoidance theory. Migrators will stay in groups as they migrate, a behavior that may protect individuals within the group from being eaten. Groups of smaller, harder to see animals begin their upward migration before larger, easier to see species, consistent with the idea that detectability by visual predators is a key issue. Small creatures may start to migrate upwards as much as 20 minutes before the sun sets, while large conspicuous fish may wait as long as 80 minutes after the sun goes down. Species that are better able to avoid predators also tend to migrate before those with poorer swimming capabilities. Squid are a primary prey for Risso's dolphins (Grampus griseus), an air-breathing predator, but one that relies on acoustic rather than visual information to hunt. Squid delay their migration pattern by about 40 minutes when dolphins are about, lessening risk by feeding later and for a shorter time.

=== Metabolic advantages ===
Another possibility is that predators can benefit from diel vertical migration as an energy conservation strategy. Studies indicate that male dogfish (Scyliorhinus canicula) follow a "hunt warm - rest cool" strategy that enables them to lower their daily energy costs. They remain in warm water only long enough to obtain food, and then return to cooler areas where their metabolism can operate more slowly.

Alternatively, organisms feeding on the bottom in cold water during the day may migrate to surface waters at night in order to digest their meal at warmer temperatures.

=== Dispersal and transport ===
Organisms can use deep and shallow currents to find food patches or to maintain a geographical location.

=== UV radiation exposure ===
As sunlight can penetrate into the water column, the chance of harmful UV exposure increases near the surface. An organism, especially something small like a microbe, might avoid getting too close to the surface during daylight so as to limit the amount of UV that damages them.

=== Water transparency ===
A theory known as the "transparency-regulator hypothesis" predicts that "the relative roles of UV and visual predation pressure will vary systematically across a gradient of lake transparency." In less transparent waters, where fish are present and more food is available, fish tend to be the main driver of DVM. In more transparent bodies of water, where fish are less numerous and food quality improves in deeper waters, UV light can travel farther, thus functioning as the main driver of DVM in such cases.

== Unusual events ==
Due to the particular types of stimuli and cues used to initiate vertical migration, anomalies can change the pattern drastically.

For example, the occurrence of midnight sun in the Arctic induces changes to planktonic life that would normally perform DVM with a 24-hour night and day cycle. In the summers of the Arctic the Earth's north pole is directed toward the sun creating longer days and at the high latitude continuous day light for more than 24 hours. Species of foraminifera found in the ocean have been observed to cease their DVM pattern, and rather remain at the surface in favor of feeding on the phytoplankton. For example Neogloboquadrina pachyderma, and for those species that contain symbionts, like Turborotalita quinqueloba, remain in sunlight to aid photosynthesis. Changes in sea-ice and surface chlorophyll concentration are found to be stronger determinants of the vertical habitat of Arctic N. pachyderma.

There is also evidence of changes to vertical migration patterns during solar eclipse events. In the moments that the sun is obscured during normal day light hours, there is a sudden dramatic decrease in light intensity. The decreased light intensity, replicates the typical lighting experienced at night time that stimulate the planktonic organisms to migrate. During an eclipse, some copepod species distribution is concentrated near the surface, for example Calanus finmarchicus displays a classic diurnal migration pattern but on a much shorter time scale during an eclipse.

== Importance for the biological pump ==
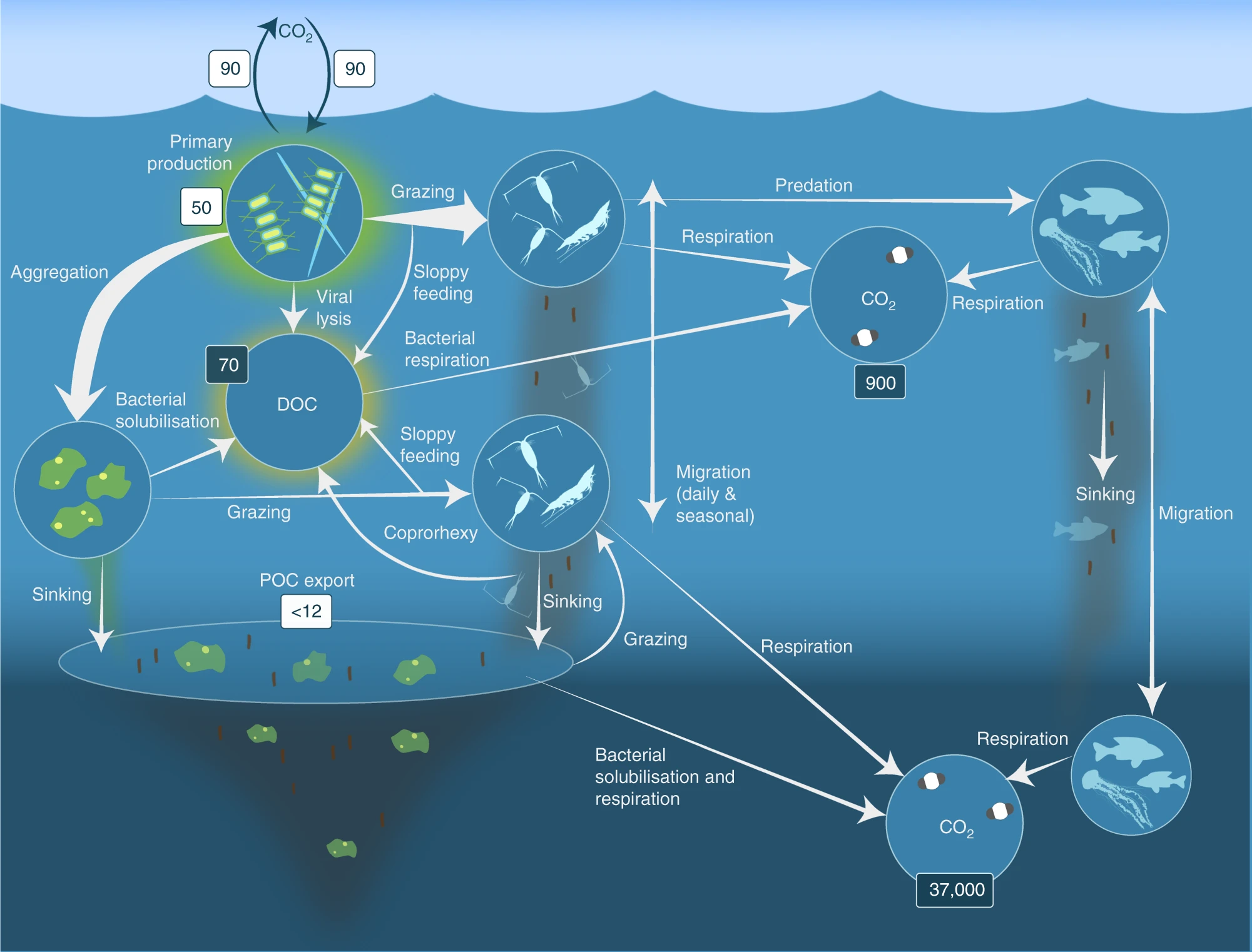
Biological pump Diel vertically migrating krill, smaller zooplankton such as copepods, and fish can actively transport carbon to depth by consuming particulate organic carbon (POC) in the surface layer at night, and metabolising it at their daytime, mesopelagic residence depths. Depending on species life history, active transport may occur on a seasonal basis as well.

The biological pump is the conversion of CO_{2} and inorganic nutrients by plant photosynthesis into particulate organic matter in the euphotic zone and transference to the deeper ocean. This is a major process in the ocean and without vertical migration it wouldn't be nearly as efficient. The deep ocean gets most of its nutrients from the higher water column when they sink down in the form of marine snow. This is made up of dead or dying animals and microbes, fecal matter, sand and other inorganic material.

Organisms migrate up to feed at night so when they migrate back to depth during the day they defecate large sinking fecal pellets. Whilst some larger fecal pellets can sink quite fast, the speed that organisms move back to depth is still faster. At night organisms are in the top 100 meters (330 ft) of the water column, but during the day they move down to between 800 and 1,000 meters (2,600 and 3,300 ft). If organisms were to defecate at the surface it would take the fecal pellets days to reach the depth that they reach in a matter of hours. Therefore, by releasing fecal pellets at depth they have almost 1000 meters less to travel to get to the deep ocean. This is known as active transport. The organisms are playing a more active role in moving organic matter down to depths. Because a large majority of the deep sea, especially marine microbes, depends on nutrients falling down, the quicker they can reach the ocean floor the better.

Zooplankton and salps play a large role in the active transport of fecal pellets. 15–50% of zooplankton biomass is estimated to migrate, accounting for the transport of 5–45% of particulate organic nitrogen to depth. Salps are large gelatinous plankton that can vertically migrate 800 meters and eat large amounts of food at the surface. They have a very long gut retention time, so fecal pellets usually are released at maximum depth. Salps are also known for having some of the largest fecal pellets. Because of this they have a very fast sinking rate, small detritus particles are known to aggregate on them. This makes them sink that much faster. As previously mentioned, the lipid pump represents a substantial flux of POC (particulate organic carbon) to the deep ocean in the form of lipids produced by large overwintering copepods. Through overwintering, these lipids are transported to the deep in autumn and are metabolized at depths below the thermocline through winter before the copepods rise to the surface in the spring. The metabolism of these lipids reduces this POC at depth while producing CO_{2} as a waste product, ultimately serving as a potentially significant contributor to oceanic carbon sequestration. Although the flux of lipid carbon from the lipid pump has been reported to be comparable to the global POC flux from the biological pump, observational challenges with the lipid pump from deficient nutrient cycling, and capture techniques have made it difficult to incorporate it into the global carbon export flux. So while currently there is still much research being done on why organisms vertically migrate, it is clear that vertical migration plays a large role in the active transport of dissolved organic matter to depth.

== See also ==
- Krill
- Phytoplankton
- Primary production
