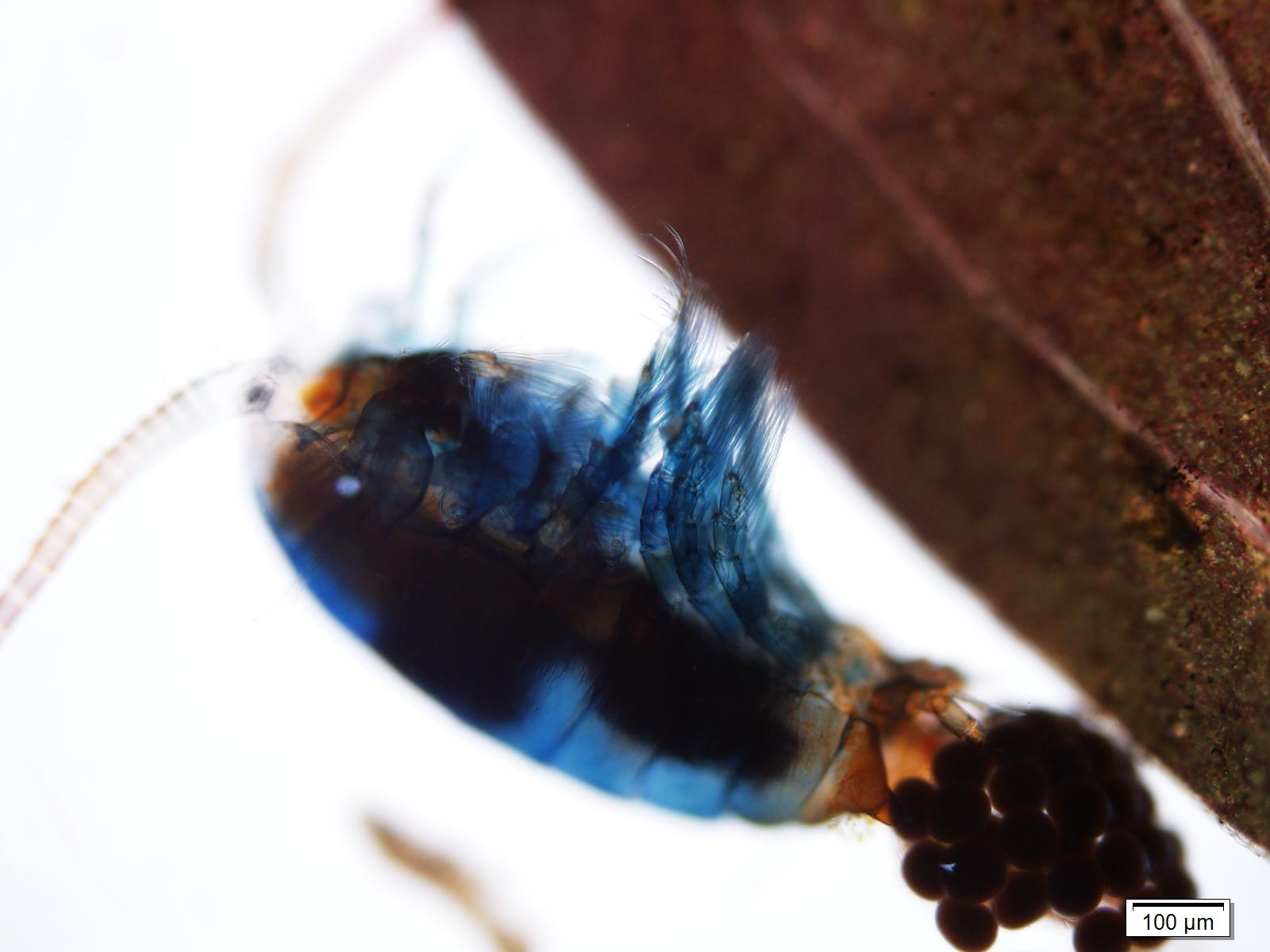
- Calanus glacialis

Scientific classification
- Kingdom: Animalia
- Phylum: Arthropoda
- Clade: Pancrustacea
- Class: Copepoda
- Order: Calanoida
- Family: Calanidae
- Genus: Calanus
- Species: C. glacialis

Binomial name
- Calanus glacialis Jaschnov, 1955

= Calanus glacialis =

Species of crustacean

Calanus glacialis is an Arctic copepod found in the north-western Atlantic Ocean, adjoining waters, and the northwestern Pacific and its nearby waters. It ranges from sea level to 1,800 metres (5,900 ft) in depth. Females generally range from about 3.6 to 5.5 millimetres (0.14 to 0.22 in) in length, and males generally range from about 3.9 to 5.4 millimetres (0.15 to 0.21 in) in length.

== Description ==
C. glacialis females generally range from about 3.6 to 5.5 millimetres (0.14 to 0.22 in) in length, and males generally range from about 3.9 to 5.4 millimetres (0.15 to 0.21 in) in length.

== Habitat and distribution ==
This copepod is found in the northwestern Atlantic, the adjoining waters of the Gulf of St. Lawrence, Greenland Sea, Barents Sea, Norwegian Sea, and the central Arctic Ocean, and northwestern Pacific, in the Bering Sea and the Chukchi Sea. It ranges from sea level to 1,800 metres (5,900 ft) in depth.

== Ecology ==
=== Reproduction and lifecycle ===
Depending on the conditions, it has a one to three year lifecycle. There are six nauplii and copepodite stages. Eggs are laid during the spring, with clutches typically being 40 to 80 eggs. During the summer, when temperatures are below 0 °C (32 °F), it takes about 46 days to go from an egg to a stage I copepodite. The other stages are mainly gone through during the summer. During the autumn, it accumulates lipids before entering diapause, usually as a stage IV or V copepodite. During mid-winter, stage V copepodites develop into females.

When breeding, C. glacialis can follow multiple strategies. When found in ice-covered areas, it uses the ice algae bloom to fuel reproduction. This is consistent with a strategy of income breeding, where resources collected during breeding are used to pay for it. When in primarily ice-free areas without an early ice algae bloom, it instead relies on previously collected resources to breed, making it a capital breeder in these cases. In both scenarios, the young take advantage of the phytoplankton bloom.

=== Feeding ===
C. glacialis is a filter-feeder, mainly feeding on microalgae during the spring bloom.
