= Capital and income breeding =

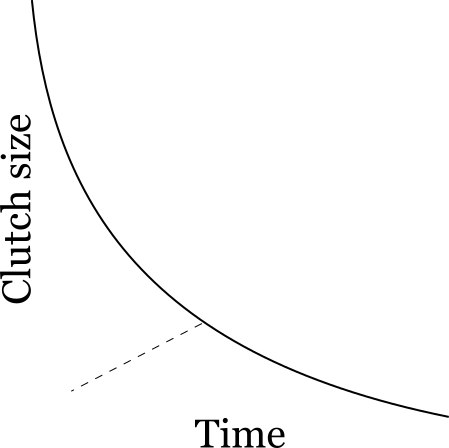
Timing of breeding in birds relying on capital breeding. The dashed line shows an example of an individual increasing in condition, while the solid line shows the threshold of when the individual breeds.

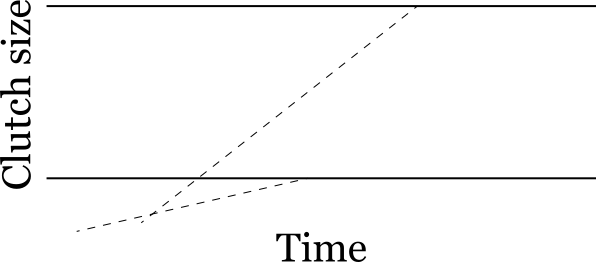
Timing of breeding in birds relying on income breeding. The dashed lines shows two examples of individuals increasing in condition (one faster than the other), while the solid line shows the threshold of when the individual breeds.

Capital breeding and income breeding refer to the methods by which some organisms perform time breeding and use resources to finance their breeding. The former "describes the situation in which reproduction is financed using stored capital; [whereas the latter] [...] refers to the use of concurrent intake to pay for a reproductive attempt."

Income breeders who are growing especially fast hold off the development of their offspring after a threshold is reached so they can produce more offspring, although this does not occur in slower growing income breeders. An organism can be both a capital and an income breeder; the parasitoid Eupelmus vuilletti, for example, is an income breeder in terms of sugars, but a capital breeder in terms of lipids. A different example of the interaction between capital and income breeding is found in Vipera aspis; although these snakes are capital breeders, they lay larger litters when food is abundant, which is a characteristic of income breeders.

The dichotomy between income and capital breeders was introduced in 1980 by R. H. Drent and S. Daan to explain why birds usually laid their eggs later than the time that would maximize nestling survival for the population.

Ectotherms are generally capital breeders, whereas endotherms rely on income breeding more often. This difference is likely due to the difference in maintenance costs, and thus in the energy that can be allocated to stores.

== Determinants of capital versus income breeding ==
In organisms that breed multiple times and live in places where food availability and mortality change significantly on the basis of season, it is predicted that capital breeding will be more prevalent, as the time when the organism is not breeding but when conditions are still favourable will be dedicated to rebuilding stores, therefore allowing them to achieve higher rates of reproduction. Capital breeding also increases with size (at least in organisms with optimal storage and indeterminate growth), as the energy dedicated to growth gives less and less return, thus meaning that energy dedicated to storage will have more return compared to that dedicated to growth. But, in eastern grey kangaroos, capital breeding is used during times of food scarcity, whereas income breeding is used during times of normal food availability. Income breeding, on the other hand, will generally be favoured in non-seasonal environments, as holding off breeding will not increase the chances that the offspring will survive. In addition, high or unpredictable demands during reproduction, which would cause the energy needed to exceed the energy provided by an income breeding strategy, may encourage capital breeding. Similarly, the possibility of decreased agility or increased conspicuity associated with, for example, egg-carrying could increase predation on reproducing individuals, making a strategy based on capital breeding more favourable, so as to avoid having to forage while reproducing.

This model does not hold for organisms that have a feeding season right after the breeding season. Copepods, for example, have their breeding season just before the feeding season, and are primarily divided into mainly capital or mainly income breeders on the basis of geography.

== In endotherms ==
Endotherms have a higher level of energy that needs to be dedicated to maintenance, thus explaining their increased reliance on income breeding.

=== In birds ===
The terms capital breeding and income breeding originated to explain why most individuals lay after the time when nestlings are most likely to survive. Both systems fit with the optimal time of laying for low-quality and high-quality individuals. High-quality individuals may choose to hold off laying until another egg is produced, as the decrease in the likelihood of survival for each egg is compensated by the additional egg. This is the opposite in low-quality individuals, in which the time to make an extra egg decreases the survival of each egg to the point where an additional egg cannot compensate for this loss.

=== In pinnipeds ===
The reliance of capital and income breeding in pinnipeds primarily depends on the availability of food, with more food favouring an increased reliance on capital breeding. This is because increase food availability allows for the accumulation of capital, which allows for a species to use capital breeding, which is more efficient as there are less energetic costs associated with it. Increased seasonality is another factor in capital versus income breeding, with higher seasonality associated with an increased reliance on income breeding, for the reasons discussed previously. Increased unpredictability also affects a pinnipeds reliance on capital breeding; less predictability increase reliance on capital breeding, as a species can use its accumulated stores to breed when there is less food available, whereas an income breeder cannot.

== In ectotherms ==
Ectotherms are generally capital breeders, likely because they have a lower level of body maintenance, meaning that more energy can be converted to body stores.

=== In copepods ===
Copepods generally have their reproduction strategy influenced by geography, with those at higher latitudes usually being capital breeders, and those in waters closer to the equator conforming to the income breeding strategy. This is because more temperate waters allow for a longer feeding season, which allows for multiple generations in income breeders (who reproduce during the feeding season), whereas colder seas with shorter feeding seasons favour capital breeders, who are not as much affected compared to income breeders by having to get their offspring to maturity before the feeding season ends. The length of the feeding season also selects for size in these organisms; income breeders are as small as possible so they can take advantage of having multiple generations per breeding season, in contrast with capital breeders, which are as large as possible so as to catch the most food to put into their reserves.
