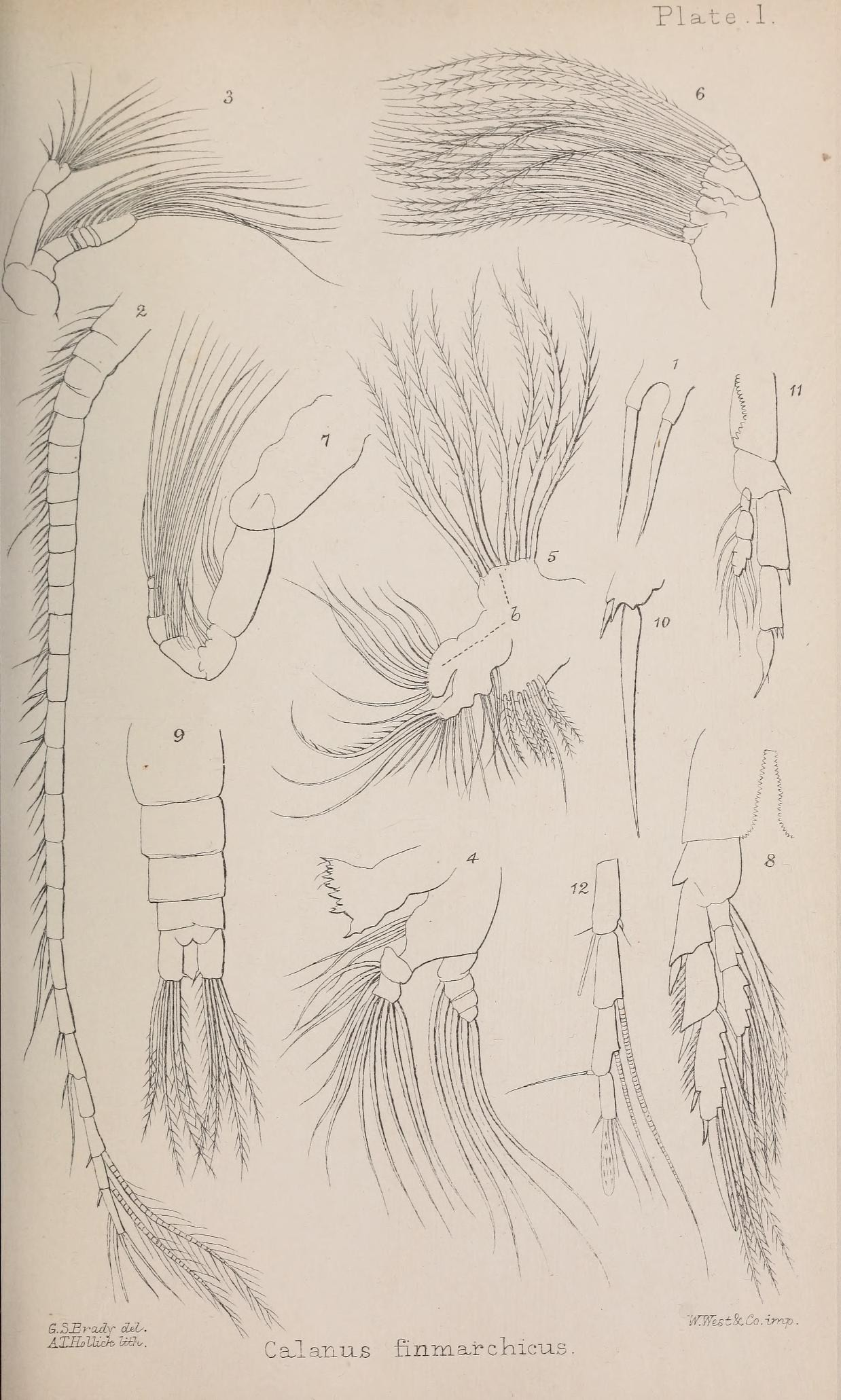
- Calanus finmarchicus

Scientific classification
- Kingdom: Animalia
- Phylum: Arthropoda
- Clade: Pancrustacea
- Class: Copepoda
- Order: Calanoida
- Family: Calanidae; Dana, 1849

Genera
- see text

= Calanidae =

Family of crustaceans

Calanidae is the large family of copepods. It includes the genus Calanus, which may be the most abundant animal genus on Earth.

Copepods of the genera Calanus and Neocalanus are ecologically important in the Arctic and subarctic regions of the world's oceans.

== Genera ==
The family contains the following genera:

- Calanoides Brady, 1883
- Calanus Leach, 1816
- Canthocalanus Scott A., 1909
- Cosmocalanus Bradford & Jillett, 1974
- Mesocalanus Bradford & Jillett, 1974
- Metranura Brady, 1915
- Nannocalanus Sars G.O., 1925
- Neocalanus Sars G.O., 1925
- Undinula Scott A., 1909
