= Calanus =

Calanus may refer to

- Calanus (crustacean), a genus of copepods
- Kalanos (also spelled Calanus), an Indian sage who met Alexander the Great
- RV Calanus, an oceanographic research vessel operated by the Scottish Association for Marine Science

== See also ==
- Kalyan (disambiguation)
