= Callianira antarctica =

Scientific classification
- Kingdom: Animalia
- Phylum: Ctenophora
- Class: Tentaculata
- Order: Cydippida
- Family: Mertensiidae
- Genus: Callianira
- Species: C. antarctica

Binomial name
- Callianira antarctica Chun, 1897

Species of ctenophore

Callianira antarctica is a species of ctenophore that physically resembles Mertensia ovum, but lacks the oil sacs. Just like other ctenophores, over 95% of its body mass and composition is water.

== Physical description ==
Callianira antarctica studied in 2002 ranged in size from 35 to 83.6 mm (1.38 to 3.29 in) in autumn months, and from 8.5 to 98 mm (0.33 to 3.86 in) in winter months. Their weight ranged from 150 to 758 mg (2.31 to 11.70 grains; 0.0053 to 0.0267 ounces) in autumn, and in winter they ranged from 2.8 to 1,366 mg (0.043 to 21.081 grains; 9.9×10^{−5} to 0.048184 ounces).

== Distribution ==
Callianira antarctica has been found in the waters of Southern Chile and Argentina, specifically the Strait of Magellan and Beagle Channel. It has also been studied and observed in Antarctic waters in the Croker Passage and Marguerite Bay. It resides in water depths ranging from 30 to 400 m (98 to 1,312 ft), but through sampling it was seen that the highest abundance of ctenophores was found to be between 120–150 m (390–490 ft) during the day, and about 250 m (820 ft) at night.

== Ecology ==
Callianira antarctica is carnivorous, and primarily hunts copepods, but during winter months will eat pteropods, and larval / juvenile krill. Observed specimens gut contents show that they feed on species such as Calanoides acutus, Limacina helicina, Calanus propinquus, metridia gerlachi, and larval/juvenile Euphausia superba. C. antarctica was observed to have a seasonal feeding on krill larvae that takes place underneath the sea ice. C. antarctica hunts by swimming in a circle pattern under the ice with its tentacles outstretched. C. antarctica's tentacles use colloblasts which stick prey to the tentacles. Then C. antarctica would retract the tentacle into its mouth and down to its gut where digestion would occur. Typically C. antarctica would hunt underneath the sea ice and swim horizontally, but some have been seen attached to the ice while hunting, and instead would hang their tentacles straight down to catch prey.

Digestion in observed specimens took anywhere from 5 hours to 46 hours. Callianira antarctica was seen excreting the hard exoskeletons of its prey after digesting the soft insides. C. antarctica needs carbon and lipids from its prey to survive, and it is thought that these needs increase during the winter months, and when in the juvenile stage of life. Unlike Mertensia ovum, Callianira antarctica has no oil sacs, and instead stores lipids in the stomodeum. Body carbon is distributed among tentacles, the gut wall, and comb rows.
