= Wohlschlag Bay =

Bay on the western side of Ross Island, Antarctica

- Location within Antarctica

Geography
- Location: Antarctica
- Coordinates: 77°22′S 166°25′E

Administration
- Antarctica
- Administered under the Antarctic Treaty System

Wohlschlag Bay (77°22′S 166°25′E) is a large bay indenting the western side of Ross Island, Antarctica, and lying between Harrison Bluff and Cape Royds.

== Exploration and naming ==
Wohlschlag Bay was charted by the Discovery Expedition under Robert Falcon Scott, 1901–1904. It was named by the United States Advisory Committee on Antarctic Names (US-ACAN) in 1964 for Donald E. Wohlschlag, professor of biology at Stanford University, who outfitted the biology laboratories on the USNS Eltanin and at McMurdo Station, where he worked five summer seasons from 1958–64. Wohlschlag, who died in 2007, is known for work on the blood chemistry of fish that survive in very cold water.

On 13 October 1992 a United States Navy Bell UH-1 Iroquois helicopter crashed in bad weather in Wohlschlag Bay near Cape Royds. There were two fatalities out of the five occupants. A stratospheric balloon used in the Japanese American Collaborative Emulsion Experiment (JACEE) came down in Wohlschlag Bay off Cape Royds on 23 December 1993. It crashed through the ice about .25 miles (0.40 km) offshore, and could not be recovered.

== Biology ==
Microalgal communities live in the lower layers of sea ice in Wohlschlag Bay. With a monospecific population of Nitzschia stellata, a common ice alga, studies suggested that there was no grazing activity. The congelation ice appears to be a refugium for the algae that many grazing animals cannot access. However, samples of zooplankton from near the sea edge of the fast sea-ice in Wohlschlag Bay shows much the same mix as further south in McMurdo Sound, apart from higher densities of the pteropod Limacina helicina. The density of zooplankton was low, and dominated by small copepods such as Oithona similis, Ctenocalanus citer and Oncaea curvata, particularly in depths under 100 metres (330 ft). Larger crustaceans were found at greated depths, including copepods such as Metridia gerlachei and Calanoides acutus.

== Features ==
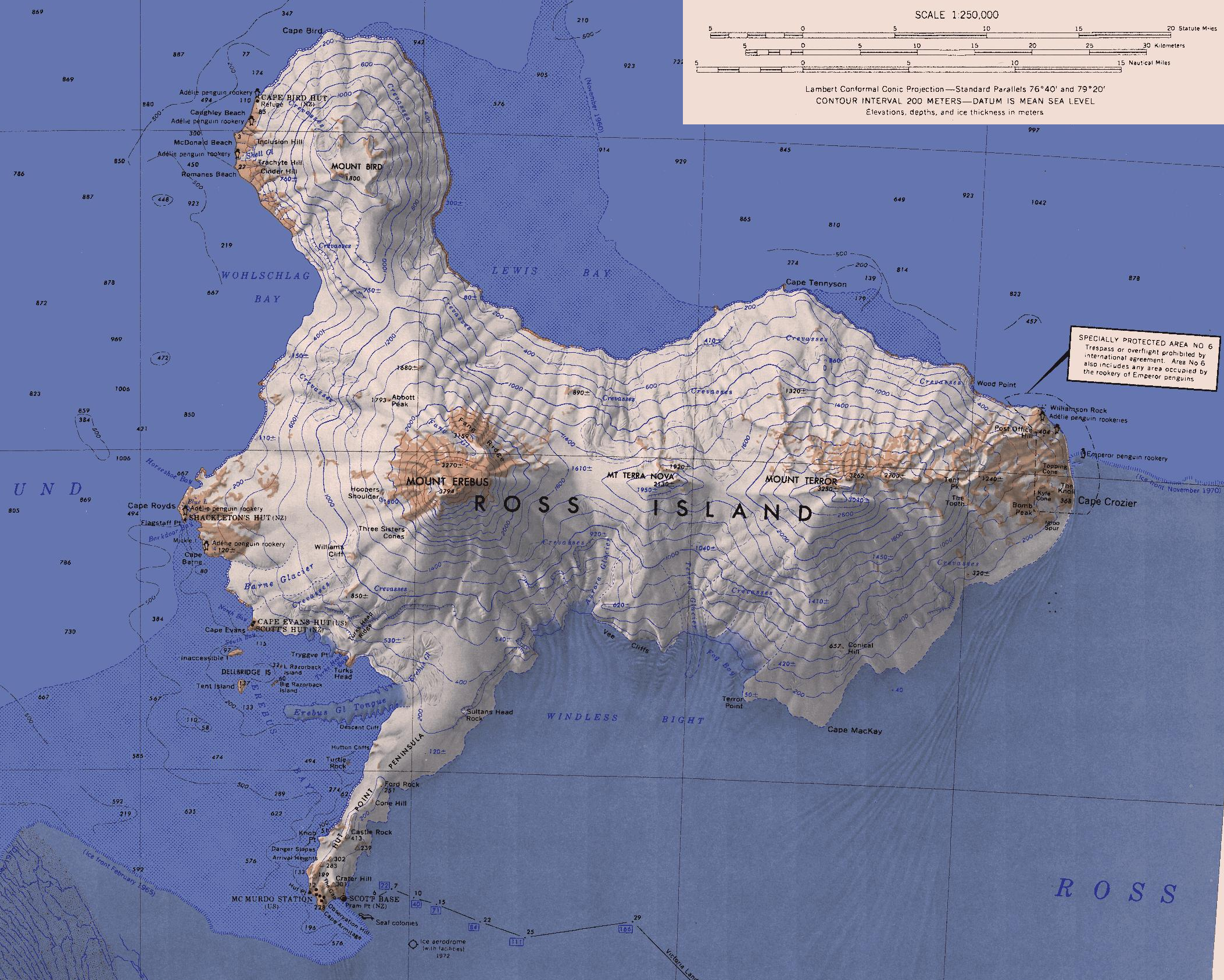
Wohlschlag Bay in northwest

=== Maumee Bight ===
77.478524°S 166.361812°E. A bight between Rocky Point and Micou Point on the west side of Ross Island. The feature is 6 nautical miles (11 km; 6.9 mi) long and forms the south part of Wohlschlag Bay. In association with the names of expedition ships grouped on this island, it was named after U.S. Naval Ship (USNS) Maumee, a tanker that made at least 12 Antarctic deployments to the Ross Sea from 1969-70 to 1984-85. With a 7,000,000 gallon capacity, and increased tank storage at McMurdo Station, Maumee initiated a program of delivering a whole year's supply of bulk petroleum products to the station in a single trip. Prior to 1969 it took two smaller ships six trips to deliver the same amount of fuel.

=== Alcorta Rocks ===
77.503981°S 166.369792°E. A nunatak on the east shore of Maumee Bight, 1.6 mi east-northeast of Rocky Point. The feature rises to about 100 metres (330 ft) and is distinctive because three ridges radiate from the center. Named by Advisory Committee on Antarctic Names (US-ACAN) (2000) after Jesse J. Alcorta, year round support employee with eight field seasons at McMurdo Station from 1992-93 and many trips to South Pole Station and Christchurch; hazardous waste handling specialist at both McMurdo and South Pole Stations; cryogenic technician in support of the U.S. Antarctic Project (USAP) laboratories.

=== Micou Point ===
77.445502°S 166.430885°E. A point 7 nautical miles (13 km; 8.1 mi) northeast of Cape Royds on the west side of Ross Island. The point constitutes the north end of Maumee Bight. Named by the Advisory Committee on Antarctic Names (US-ACAN) in 1993 for air crewman United States Navy (United States Navy) Benjamin Micou, who lost his life in a helicopter accident near this point on October 13, 1992.

=== Tazieff Rocks ===
77.456004°S 166.496495°E. A nunatak 0.8 nautical miles (1.5 km; 0.92 mi) southeast of Micou Point. It rises to about 200 metres (660 ft) high at the south end of Endeavour Piedmont Glacier. At the suggestion of P.R. Kyle, named by Advisory Committee on Antarctic Names (US-ACAN) after Haroun Tazieff (d.), a renowned French volcanologist who worked at Mount Erebus with several groups of French scientists in three field seasons, 1973-79.

== Sources ==
- Alberts, Fred G., ed. (1995), Geographic Names of the Antarctic (PDF) (2 ed.), United States Board on Geographic Names This article incorporates public domain material from websites or documents of the United States Board on Geographic Names.
- "Alcorta Rocks", Geographic Names Information System, United States Geological Survey, United States Department of the Interior
- "Bell HH-1N accident 56399", aviation-safety.net
- Foster, B.A (1987), "Composition and abundance of zooplankton under the spring sea-ice of McMurdo Sound, Antarctica", Polar Biol (8): 41–48, doi:10.1007/BF00297163
- "Maumee Bight", Geographic Names Information System, United States Geological Survey, United States Department of the Interior
- "Micou Point", Geographic Names Information System, United States Geological Survey, United States Department of the Interior
- Pacheco, Luis E., "Balloon launched on 12/14/1993, from Williams Field, McMurdo Station, Antarctica", Stratocat
- Palmisano, Anna C.; Boczar, Barbara A.; Smith, Glen A.; Lizotte, Michael P.; Sullivan, Cornelius W. (1987), "Isolation and identification of photosynthetic pigments in sea-ice communities in McMurdo Sound" (PDF), Antarctic Journal
- Parker, Dan (May 17, 2007), "Wohlschlag leaves legacy", Port Aransas South Jetty
- "Tazieff Rocks", Geographic Names Information System, United States Geological Survey, United States Department of the Interior

This article incorporates public domain material from websites or documents of the United States Geological Survey.
