= Callianira cristata =

Scientific classification
- Kingdom: Animalia
- Phylum: Ctenophora
- Class: Tentaculata
- Order: Cydippida
- Family: Mertensiidae
- Genus: Callianira
- Species: C. cristata

Binomial name
- Callianira cristata Moser, 1909

Species of ctenophore

Callianira cristata is a species of ctenophore of the family Mertensiidae. They have been discovered in the Southern Ocean.
