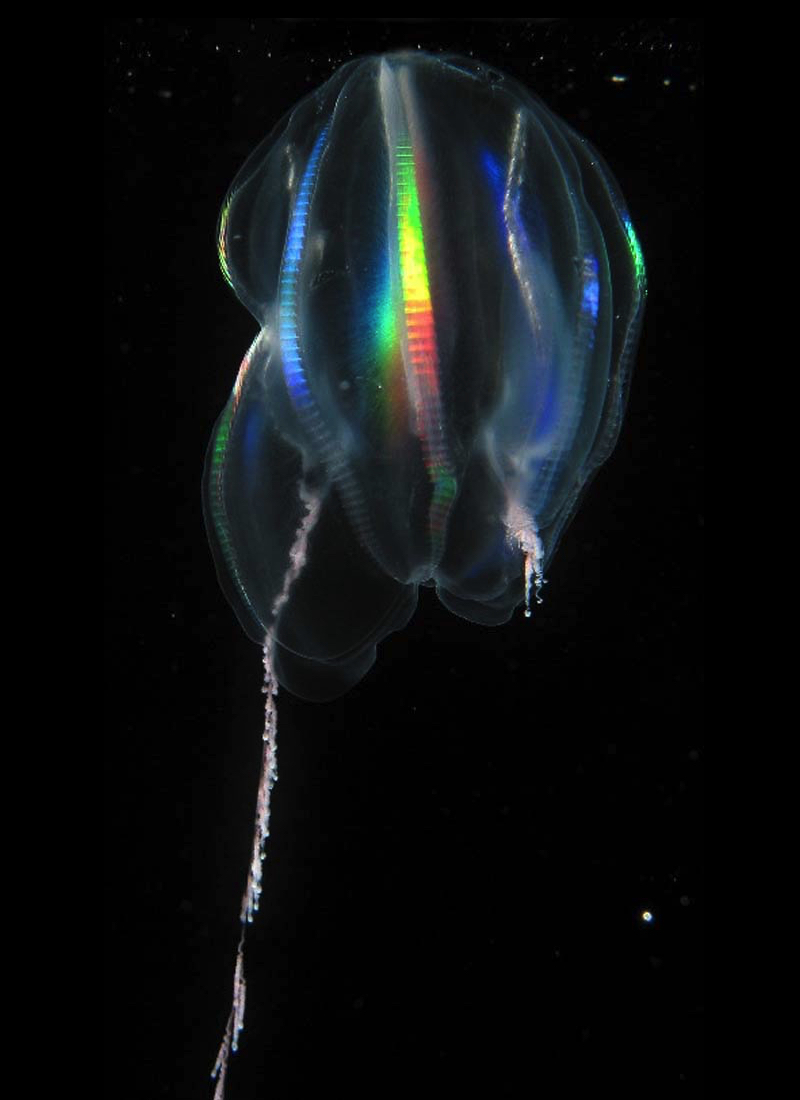

Scientific classification
- Kingdom: Animalia
- Phylum: Ctenophora
- Class: Tentaculata
- Order: Cydippida
- Family: Mertensiidae
- Genus: Mertensia; Lesson, 1830
- Species: M. ovum

Binomial name
- Mertensia ovum (Fabricius, 1780)

Synonyms
- Genus synonymy: Martensia Agassiz, 1860; Species synonymy: Beroe octoptera Mertens, 1833; Beroe ovum Fabricius, 1780; Cydippe ovum Fabr. Mörch.; Martensia octoptera (Mertens, 1833); Mertensia cucullus L. Agassiz, 1860

= Mertensia ovum =

Species of comb jelly

Mertensia ovum, also known as the Arctic comb jelly or sea nut, is a cydippid comb jelly or ctenophore first described as Beroe ovum by Johan Christian Fabricius in 1780. It is the only species in the genus Mertensia. Unusually among ctenophores, which normally prefer warmer waters, it is found in the Arctic and adjacent polar seas, mostly in surface waters down to 50 metres (160 ft).

In addition to being weakly bioluminescent in blues and greens, comb jellies produce a rainbow effect similar to that seen on an oil slick, and which is caused by interference of incident light on the eight rows of moving cilia or comb rows which propel the organism. The comb rows beat sequentially, rather like the action of a Mexican wave. The comb rows also function as chemical sense organs, serving the same role as insect antennae. M. ovum is the major source of bioluminescence from Arctic gelatinous zooplankton.

This species, like other ctenophores, has a large body cavity and is carnivorous, feeding on copepods and small crustaceans snagged by its two extremely sticky and robust tentacles (see Tentaculata). These are long and contractile with numerous lateral tentillae or side branches bearing colloblasts, each of which consists of a coiled spiral filament, structurally similar to a nematocyst, but instead of injecting a toxin, releases an adhesive substance which ensnares the prey. These tentacles can be retracted into a tentacle sheath. The body is on the whole light pink in colour, oval in the tentacular plane and considerably compressed in the sagittal plane. Its unconventional brain consists of a network of nerves arranged under its outer skin.

A study in the Barents Sea found that it ingests prey ranging from small copepods to amphipods and krill, but that its staple diet consists of large copepod species such as Calanus finmarchicus, C. glacialis, C. hyperboreus and Metridia longa.

Like garden snails, Mertensia is hermaphroditic, reproducing sexually and occasionally asexually. Eggs and sperm are ejected into the water and from the fertilized eggs ovoid larvae develop. The planktonic larvae of this species are 2–3 millimetres (0.08–0.12 in) long while adults grow up to 10 centimetres (3.9 in). In the Baltic sea its population is solely consisting of sexual active larvae

The genus name Mertensia commemorates the German naturalist Karl Heinrich Mertens aka Andrei Karlovich Mertens (17 May 1796 – 18 September 1830). Mertens accompanied the Russian naturalist Alexander Philipov Postels aboard the Senyavin in 1826 on a voyage to "reconnoitre and describe the coasts of Kamchatka, the land of the Chuchkis and the Koriaks (the coasts of which have not yet been described by anyone, and which are unknown except by the voyage of Captain Bering); the coasts of the Okhotsk Sea, and the Shantar Islands, which although they are known to us, have not been sufficiently described."
