= Callianira bialata =

Scientific classification
- Kingdom: Animalia
- Phylum: Ctenophora
- Class: Tentaculata
- Order: Cydippida
- Family: Mertensiidae
- Genus: Callianira
- Species: C. bialata

Binomial name
- Callianira bialata Delle Chiaje, 1841

Synonyms
- Eschscholtzia cordata Kölliker, 1853

Species of ctenophore

Callianira bialata is a species of comb jelly within the family Mertensiidae.

== Physical description ==
The body of Callianira bialata is jelly-like, pink, lobed, and heart-shaped, with two outgrowths on the bottom half. It has two tentacles, and its body length ranges between 2-4 cm.

== Ecology ==
Callianira bialata catches its prey using the colloblasts on its tentacles.

It is hermaphroditic, and reproduces externally.
