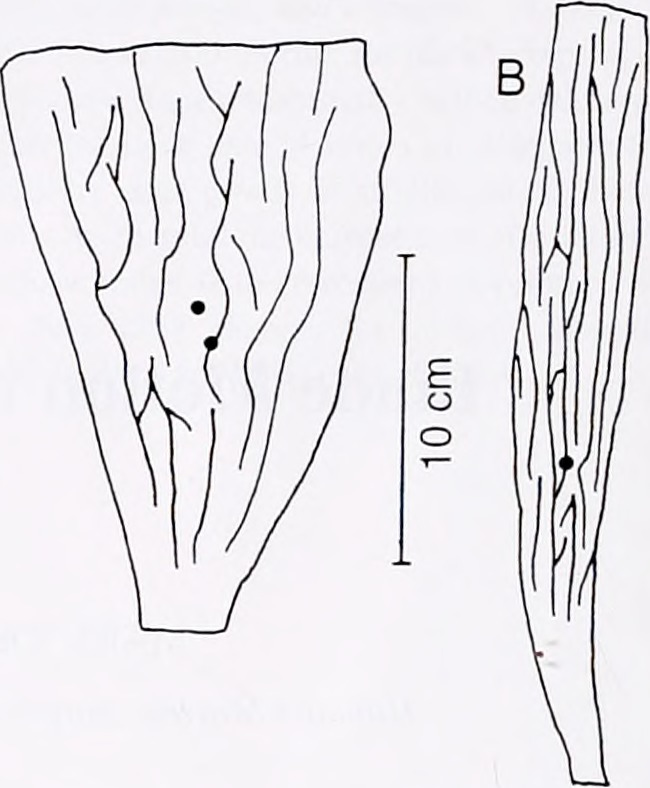

Scientific classification
- Domain: Eukaryota
- Clade: Diaphoretickes
- Clade: SAR
- Clade: Stramenopiles
- Phylum: Gyrista
- Subphylum: Ochrophytina
- Class: Phaeophyceae
- Order: Laminariales
- Family: Lessoniaceae
- Genus: Eisenia
- Species: E. arborea

Binomial name
- Eisenia arborea Aresch., 1876

= Eisenia arborea =

Species of kelp

Eisenia arborea, or the southern sea palm (not to be confused with the sea palm), is a dominant species of kelp that is found on the western Pacific coast of North America, from Vancouver Island, Canada south to Mexico's Isla Magdalena and Baja California, as well as in Japan. They are commonly found from the midtidal areas stretching to the subtidal areas. It is an edible seaweed, a source of nutrients for grazing marine invertebrates and a source of alginic acid, a food thickener. Some of the algas have a hollow stipe above its holdfast with two branches terminating in multiple blades. Eisenia arborea is studied in order to predict environmental stress in oceans intertidal zones. Hollow stipes where present when the Eisenia arborea did not receive essential nutrients for its thalli development. Eisenia arborea with hollow stripes are believed to be evolved algae in order to increase their survival in harsh living conditions. They play a huge role in determining environmental stress.

The phlorotannin Phlorofucofuroeckol-B can be isolated from E. arborea.
