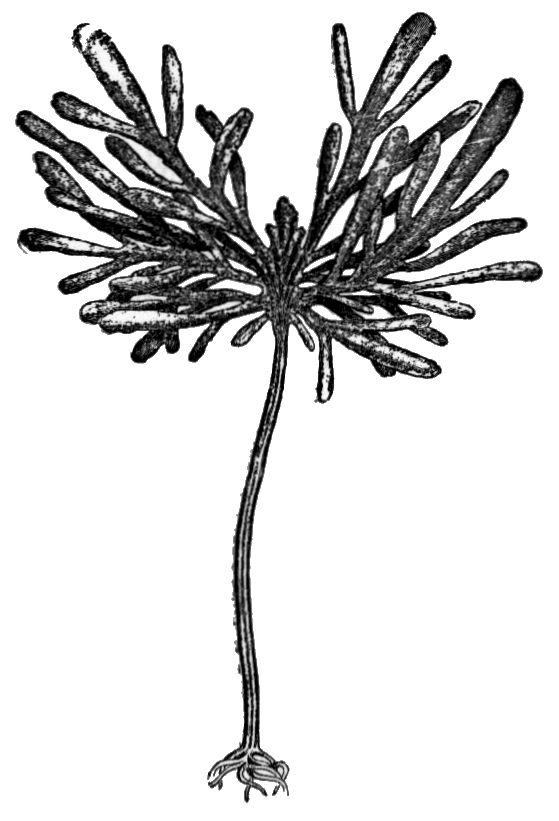
- Eisenia bicyclis

Scientific classification
- Domain: Eukaryota
- Clade: Diaphoretickes
- Clade: SAR
- Clade: Stramenopiles
- Phylum: Gyrista
- Subphylum: Ochrophytina
- Class: Phaeophyceae
- Order: Laminariales
- Family: Lessoniaceae
- Genus: Eisenia; J.E. Areschoug, 1876

Species
- See text

= Eisenia (alga) =

Genus of seaweeds

Eisenia is a brown alga genus in the family Lessoniaceae. The genus is named for California Academy of Sciences curator, Gustav Eisen.

The genus was circumscribed by Johan Erhard Areschoug in Bot. Not. (1876) on page 68 in 1876

Eisenia bicyclis (the arame (荒布)) is a species of kelp best known for its use in Japanese cuisine.

== Species ==
- Eisenia arborea
- Eisenia bicyclis
- Eisenia cokeri
- Eisenia desmarestioides
- Eisenia galapagensis
- Eisenia gracilis
- Eisenia masonii
