= Callianira =

Callianira can refer to:

- one of the Nereids, sea-nymphs in Greek mythology
- Callianira (ctenophore), a genus of tentaculate comb jellies, established by Péron and Lesueur in 1810
- Callianira, an invalid butterfly genus established by Hübner around 1819, now in Limenitis
- Callianira, an invalid butterfly genus established by Doubleday in 1847, now in Eunica
