= Rocky Point (Antarctica) =

Headland of Antarctica

Coordinates: 77°31′09″S 166°13′22″E

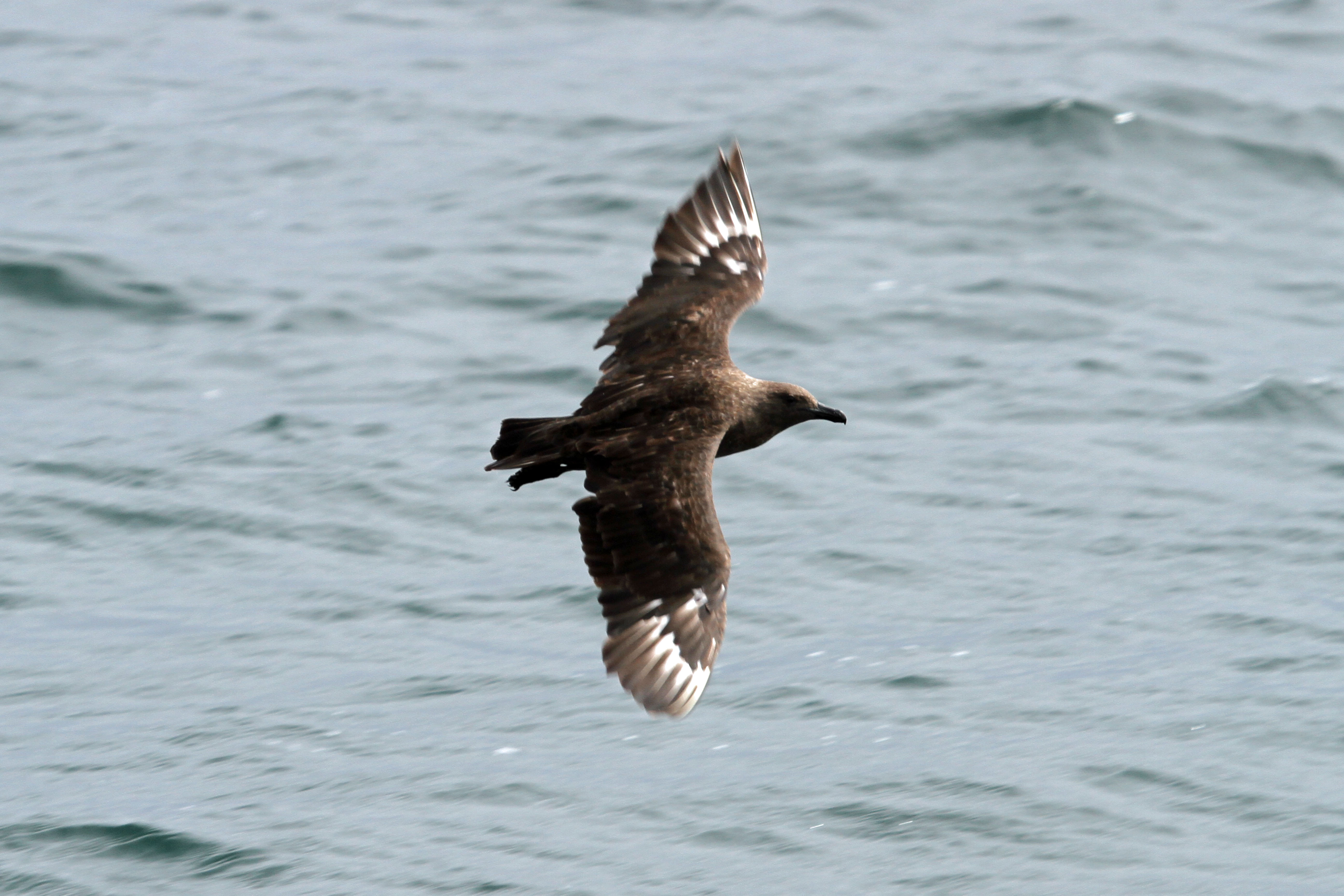
South polar skuas breed at the point

Location of Rocky Point in the Ross Dependency, Antarctica

Rocky Point is a 40 m high headland between Horseshoe Bay and Maumee Bight, about four km north of Cape Royds on Ross Island, Antarctica.

== Important Bird Area ==
A 40 ha site, comprising all the ice-free ground at the point, has been designated an Important Bird Area (IBA) by BirdLife International because it supports a breeding colony of south polar skuas, with abouty 66 breeding pairs counted in 1981.
