= Charistephane =

Scientific classification
- Kingdom: Animalia
- Phylum: Ctenophora
- Class: Tentaculata
- Order: Cydippida
- Family: Mertensiidae
- Genus: Charistephane; Chun, 1879
- Species: C. fugiens

Binomial name
- Charistephane fugiens Chun, 1879

Genus of ctenophore

Charistephane is a monotypic genus of ctenophores belonging to the family Mertensiidae. The only species in this genus is Charistephane fugiens.
