= Karl Heinrich Mertens =

German botanist and naturalist (1796–1830)

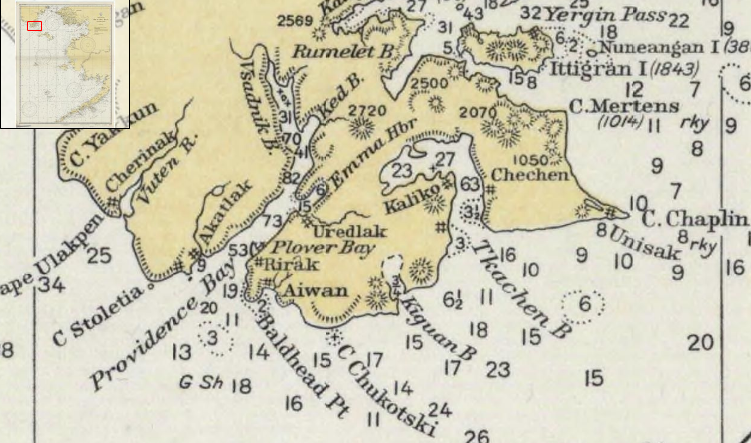
Location of Cape Mertens

Karl Heinrich Mertens (Russian: Андрей Карлович Мертенс, romanized: Andrey Karlovich Mertens; 17 May 1796 – 29 September 1830 Kronstadt), was a German botanist and naturalist, and son of the botanist Franz Carl Mertens.

== Life ==
Mertens was born in Bremen and became interested in botany at an early age from his father. He took part in campaigns in 1813 and 1815 and came to know several French botanists. He visited his father's friend Dawson Turner in England and after returning he began to study medicine and natural sciences at the University of Göttingen and Halle. He moved to Bremen in 1921. He hoped to join the expedition of Kotzebue but found no opening and then practiced as a physician in Ukraine. He then went aboard as a physician and naturalist on the Russian vessel Senyavin under Captain Lieutenant Fedor Petrovich Litke with orders to explore the coasts of Russian America and Asia. This turned out to be one of the most productive voyages of discovery in the nineteenth century. Mertens, ornithologist Baron von Kittlitz, and mineralogist Alexander Postels collected and described over 1 000 new species of animal life, and some 2 500 specimens of plants, algae, and rocks.

Shortly after this voyage, Litke and the Senyavin set out on another scientific expedition to Iceland. Mertens, the chief scientist was struck by an epidemic of typhoid that broke out on the ship. On return Mertens was also infected after the expedition's return to Kronstadt. He died from the infection at St. Petersburg.

Cape Mertens (64°32’N, 172°25’W) east of the Chukotka Peninsula at the exit from the Senyavin Straits is named in his honour, as is the ctenophore genus Mertensia created by Lesson in 1830 and the family Mertensiidae by Louis Agassiz in 1860, as well as many specific names. The plant genus Mertensia is in honour of his father.
