= Elias Magnus Fries =

Swedish mycologist (1794–1878)

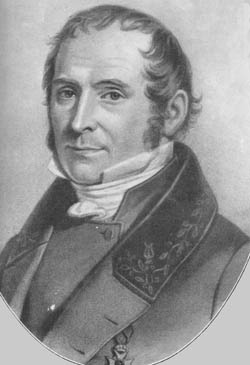
- Born: 15 August 1794; Femsjö, Hylte Municipality, Småland, Sweden
- Died: 8 February 1878 (aged 83); Uppsala
- Education: Lund University
- Known for: Founder of modern fungal taxonomy
- Scientific career
- Fields: Mycology, botany
- Workplaces: Lund University (1814–1834), Uppsala University (1834–1878)
- Author abbrev. (botany): Fr.

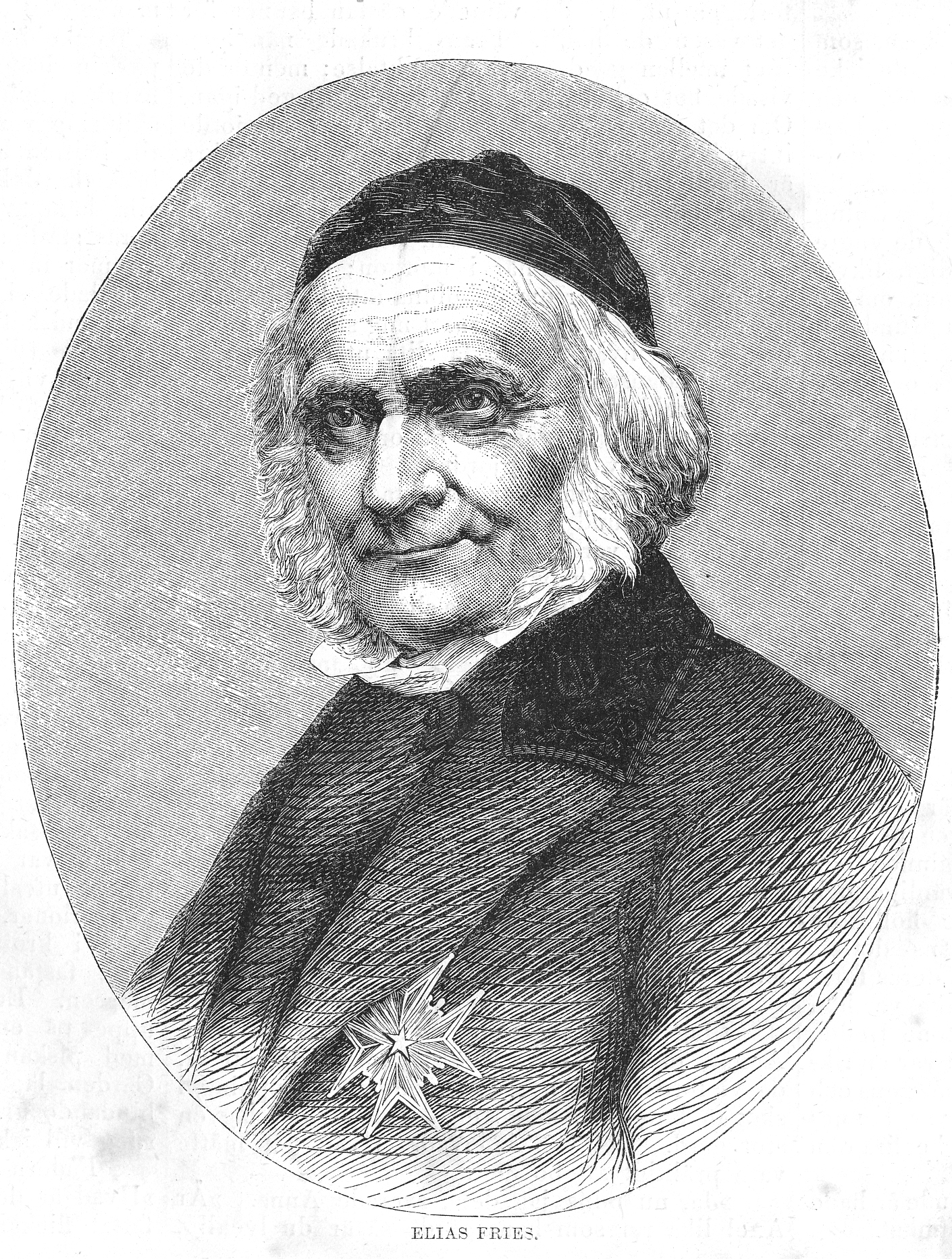
Elias Fries in old age

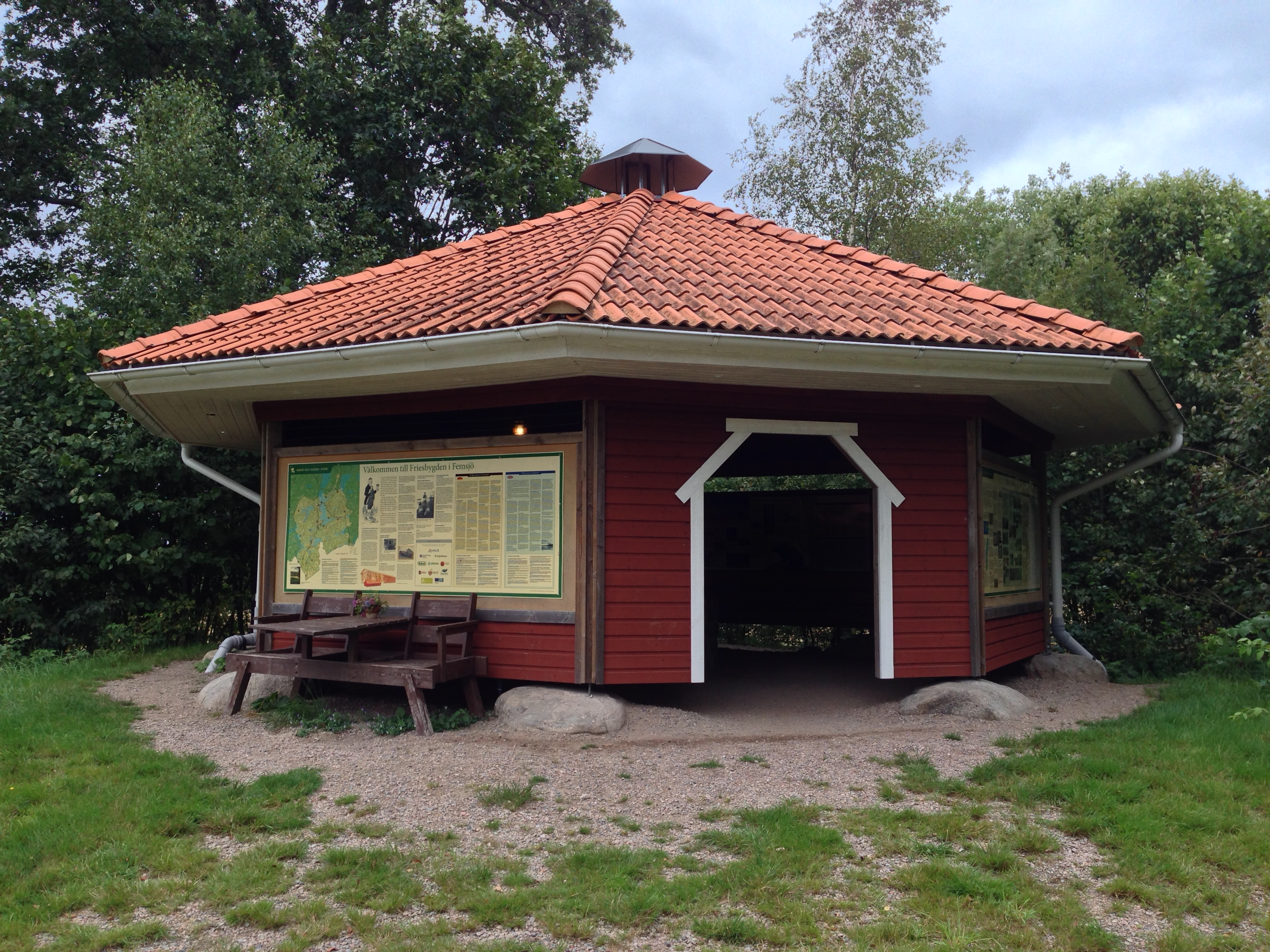
Building containing historical information on Elias Fries located in Femsjö

Elias Magnus Fries (15 August 1794 – 8 February 1878) was a Swedish mycologist and botanist. He is sometimes called the "Linnaeus of Mycology". In his works he described and assigned botanical names to thousands of fungus and lichen species, many of which remain authoritative today.

== Career ==
Fries was born at Femsjö (Hylte Municipality), Småland, the son of the pastor there. He attended school in Växjö.

He acquired an extensive knowledge of flowering plants from his father. In 1811 Fries entered Lund University where he studied under Carl Adolph Agardh and Anders Jahan Retzius. He obtained his doctorate in 1814. In the same year he was appointed an associate professorship in botany. Fries edited several exsiccata series, the first starting in 1818 under the title Lichenes Sveciae exsiccati, curante Elia Fries and the last together with Franz Joseph Lagger under the title Hieracia europaea exsiccata. He was elected a member of the Royal Swedish Academy of Sciences, and in 1824, became a full professor. In 1834 he became Borgström professor (Swed. Borgströmianska professuren, a chair endowed by Erik Eriksson Borgström, 1708–1770) in applied economics at Uppsala University. The position was changed to "professor of botany and applied economics" in 1851. He was elected a Foreign Honorary Member of the American Academy of Arts and Sciences in 1849. That year he was also appointed director of the Uppsala University Botanical Garden. In 1853, he became rector of the University.

Fries most important works were the three-volume Systema mycologicum (1821–1832), Elenchus fungorum (1828), the two-volume Monographia hymenomycetum Sueciae (1857 and 1863) and Hymenomycetes Europaei (1874).

Fries is considered to be, after Christian Hendrik Persoon, a founding father of the modern taxonomy of mushrooms. His taxonomy of mushrooms was influenced by Goethe and the German romantics. He utilized spore color and arrangement of the hymenophore (pores, gills, teeth etc.) as major taxonomic characteristics. He was one of the most prolific authors of new fungal species, having formally described 3210 in his career.

Fries died in Uppsala on 8 February 1878. When he died, The Times commented: "His very numerous works, especially on fungi and lichens, give him a position as regards those groups of plants comparable only to that of Linnaeus." Fries was succeeded in the Borgström professorship (from 1859 to 1876) by Johan Erhard Areschoug, after whom Theodor Magnus Fries, the son of Elias, held the chair (from 1877 to 1899).

== Publications ==
- Monographia Pyrenomycetum Sueciae (1816)
- Systema Mycologicum (1821)
- Systema Orbis Vegetabilis (1825)
- Elenchus Fungorem (1828)
- Lichenographia Europaea Reformata (1831)
- Epicrisis Systematis Mycologici: seu synopsis hymenomycetum (1838)

== Family ==
His wife was Christina Wieslander (1808–1862), with whom he raised nine children. His son Theodor Magnus Fries became a botanist and lichenologist, eventually holding the Borgström professorship himself, and another son, Oscar Robert Fries, became a physician in Gothenburg while maintaining a keen interest in mycology. Theodor "Thore" Magnus's sons Thore Christian Elias Fries and Robert Elias Fries also became botanists.

== See also ==
- Category:Taxa named by Elias Magnus Fries

Cultural offices
Preceded by Erik Gustaf Geijer	Swedish Academy, Seat No.14; 1847–1878	Succeeded by Carl Rupert Nyblom
