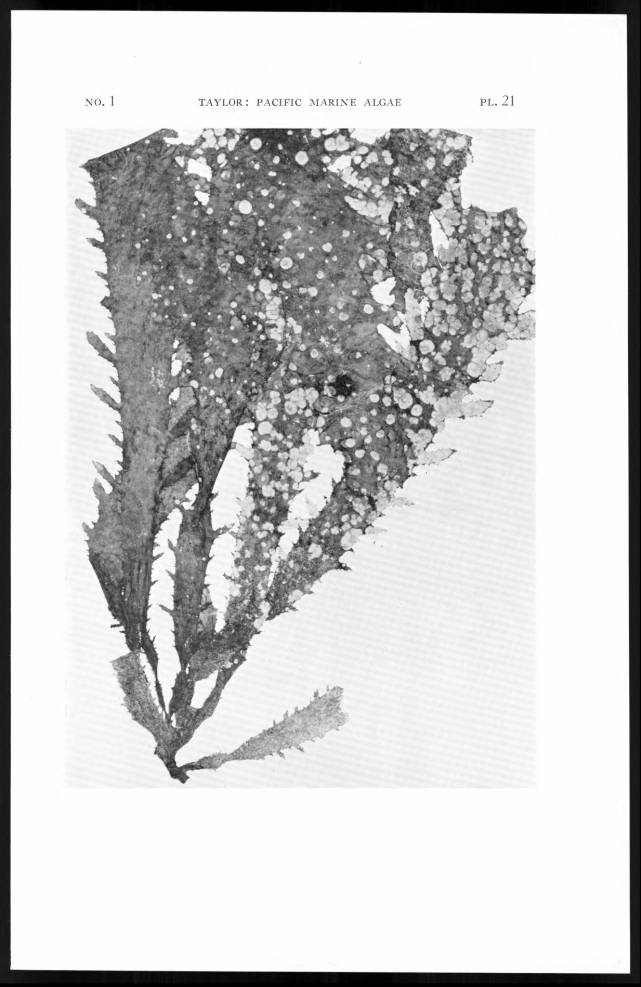

Conservation status
- Vulnerable (IUCN 3.1)

Scientific classification
- Domain: Eukaryota
- Clade: Sar
- Clade: Stramenopiles
- Division: Ochrophyta
- Class: Phaeophyceae
- Order: Laminariales
- Family: Lessoniaceae
- Genus: Eisenia
- Species: E. galapagensis

Binomial name
- Eisenia galapagensis W.R.Taylor, 1945

= Eisenia galapagensis =

Species of kelp

Eisenia galapagensis is an endemic species of kelp that is found around the Galápagos Islands. It is found mostly in the cold nutrient-rich waters west of the archipelago.
