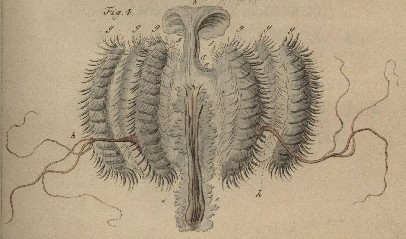
- illustration of Callianira hexagona

Scientific classification
- Domain: Eukaryota
- Kingdom: Animalia
- Phylum: Ctenophora
- Class: Tentaculata
- Order: Cydippida
- Family: Mertensiidae
- Genus: Callianira
- Species: C. hexagona

Binomial name
- Callianira hexagona (Bruguière, 1778)

Synonyms
- Beroe hexagonus Bruguière, 1789

= Callianira hexagona =

Species of comb jelly

Callianira hexagona is a species of ctenophore of the family Mertensiidae. The scientific name of this species was first published in 1789 by Bruguière.
