= Mount Bird =

Mountain in Ross Dependency, Antarctica

- Location within Antarctica

Highest point
- Elevation: 1,765 m (5,791 ft)
- Coordinates: 77°17′S 166°43′E

Geography
- Continent: Antarctica
- Region: Ross Dependency

Geology
- Mountain type: Shield volcano
- Volcanic belt: McMurdo Volcanic Group

Mount Bird (77°17′S 166°43′E) is a 1,765 metres (5,791 ft) high shield volcano standing about 7 nautical miles (13 km; 8.1 mi) south of Cape Bird, the northern extremity of Ross Island. It was mapped by the British National Antarctic Expedition, 1901–04, under Robert Falcon Scott, and apparently named by them after Cape Bird.

== Geography ==
Mount Bird was originally a separate island, which through volcanic activity has become a rounded peninsula on the northwestern tip of Ross Island. At its southernmost point, where it is connected with the rest of the island by a 10-kilometre (6.2 mi) wide isthmus, a 500-metre (1,600 ft) high pass, Bird Pass, separates the bulk of Mount Bird from the northern slopes of Mount Erebus. The peninsula is flanked to the west and east by two large and frequently ice-bound bays, Wohlschlag Bay in the west and Lewis Bay in the east.

== Geology ==
Mount Bird is a basaltic shield volcano that was active from 4.6 to 3.8 million years ago. On the flanks of the volcano there are poorly exposed basalt scoria cones, and phonolite domes and flows. The coastal cliffs display the shield's thick stack of basalt lava flows.

== Glaciers and streams ==
Several glaciers or meltwater streams flow from the mountain to the sea.

=== Fitzgerald Stream ===
77°16′S 166°21′E. A stream between Fitzgerald Hill and Inclusion Hill on the lower ice-free west slopes of Mount Bird, flowing to McMurdo Sound across McDonald Beach. Explored by the NZGSAE, 1958-59, and named by the NZ-APC for E.B. Fitzgerald, deputy leader of the expedition.

=== Shell Glacier ===
77°16′S 166°25′E. A western lobe of the Mount Bird icecap. It descends steeply in the valley north of Trachyte Hill and Harrison Bluff in the center of the ice-free area on the lower western slopes of Mount Bird. Mapped and so named by the New Zealand Geological Survey Antarctic Expedition (NZGSAE), 1958–59, because of the marine shell content of the moraines.

=== Harrison Stream ===
77°17′S 166°24′E. A small stream flowing west between Trachyte and Cinder Hills to the north end of Romanes Beach. Mapped by the NZGSAE, 1958-59. Named by the New Zealand Antarctic Place-Names Committee (NZ-APC) for J. Harrison, mountaineer-assistant with the expedition.

=== Wilson Stream ===
77°17′S 166°26′E. A meltwater stream which flows from the ice-free lower west slopes of Mount Bird, to the south of Alexander Hill, and over steep sea cliffs into Wohlschlag Bay. Mapped by the NZGSAE, 1958-59, and named by the NZ-APC for J. Wilson, mountaineer assistant with the expedition.

=== Quaternary Icefall ===
77°18′S 166°30′E. A western lobe of the Mount Bird icecap, descending steeply into Wohlschlag Bay 1 nautical mile (1.9 km; 1.2 mi) south of Cinder Hill. Mapped and so named by the NZGSAE, 1958-59, because of the Quaternary glacial period marine shells carried by the glacier and deposited in terminal moraines.

=== Endeavour Piedmont Glacier ===
77.406111°S 166.710398°E. A piedmont glacier, 6 nautical miles (11 km; 6.9 mi) long and 2 nautical miles (3.7 km; 2.3 mi) wide, between the southwest part of Mount Bird and Micou Point. In association with the names of expedition ships grouped on this island, named after HMNZS Endeavour, tanker/supply ship which for at least 10 seasons, 1962-63 to 1971-72, transported bulk petroleum products and cargo to Scott Base and McMurdo Station on Ross Island.

== Northern features ==
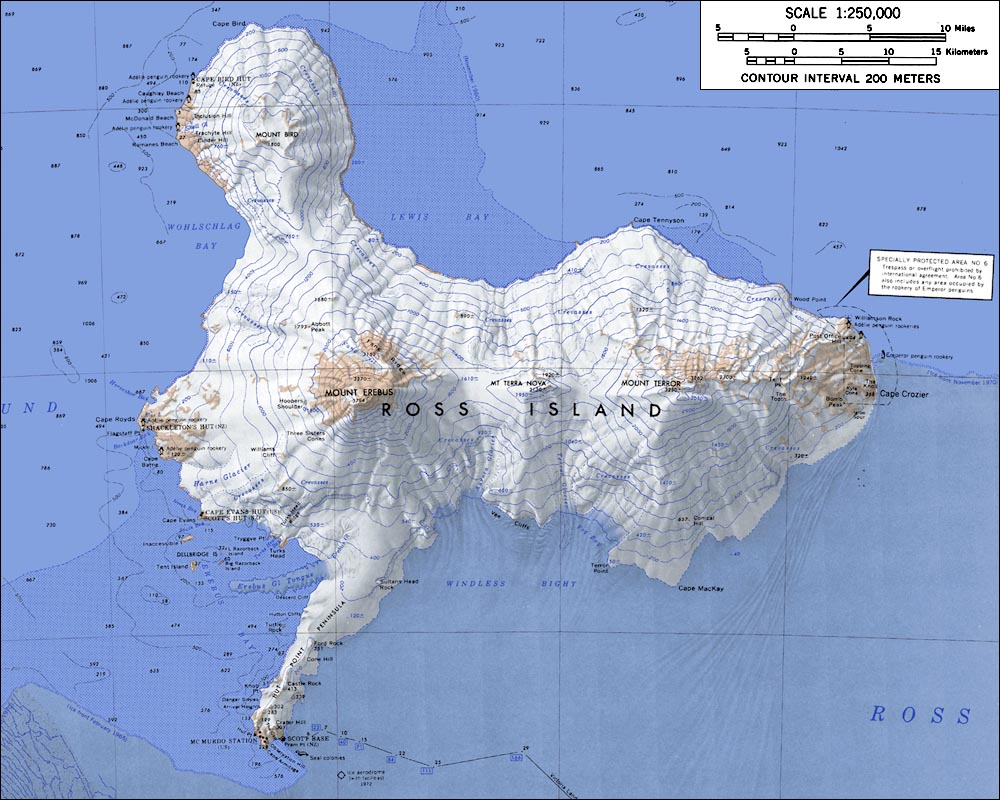
Ross Island. Mount Bird in the northwest

Inland features around the north of Mount Bird include:

=== Takahe Nunatak ===
77.21506°S 166.803196°E. The northern of two similar nunataks that lie 0.3 nautical miles (0.56 km; 0.35 mi) apart and 3.3 nautical miles (6.1 km; 3.8 mi) north-northeast of Mount Bird in northwest Ross Island. It rises to about 1,100 metres (3,600 ft) high and, like Kakapo Nunatak is one of several features near Mount Bird assigned the native name of a New Zealand mountain bird. Named by New Zealand Geographic Board (NZGB), 2000.

=== Kakapo Nunatak ===
77.220489°S 166.795824°E. The southern of two similar nunataks that lie 0.3 nautical miles (0.56 km; 0.35 mi) apart and 3.3 nautical miles (6.1 km; 3.8 mi) north-northeast of Mount Bird in northwest Ross Island. It rises to about 1,200 metres (3,900 ft) high and, like Takahe Nunatak close NE, appears to be part of an ice-covered crater rim. Kakapo Nunatak is one of several features near Mount Bird assigned the native name of a New Zealand mountain bird. Named by New Zealand Geographic Board (NZGB), 2000.

=== Norman Crag ===
77.233769°S 166.746487°E. A rugged nunatak 2.2 nautical miles (4.1 km; 2.5 mi) north of the summit of Mount Bird. The feature has a divided summit area and rises to over 1,400 metres (4,600 ft). Named by New Zealand Geographic Board (NZGB) (2000) after Bob Norman.

=== Ruru Crests ===
77.240196°S 166.634762°E. Two parallel rock ridges 2.2 nautical miles (4.1 km; 2.5 mi) northwest of the summit of Mount Bird. The feature rises to about 1,400 metres (4,600 ft). It is one of several landmarks near Mount Bird assigned the native name of a New Zealand mountain bird. Named by New Zealand Geographic Board (NZGB), 2000.

=== Nash Peak ===
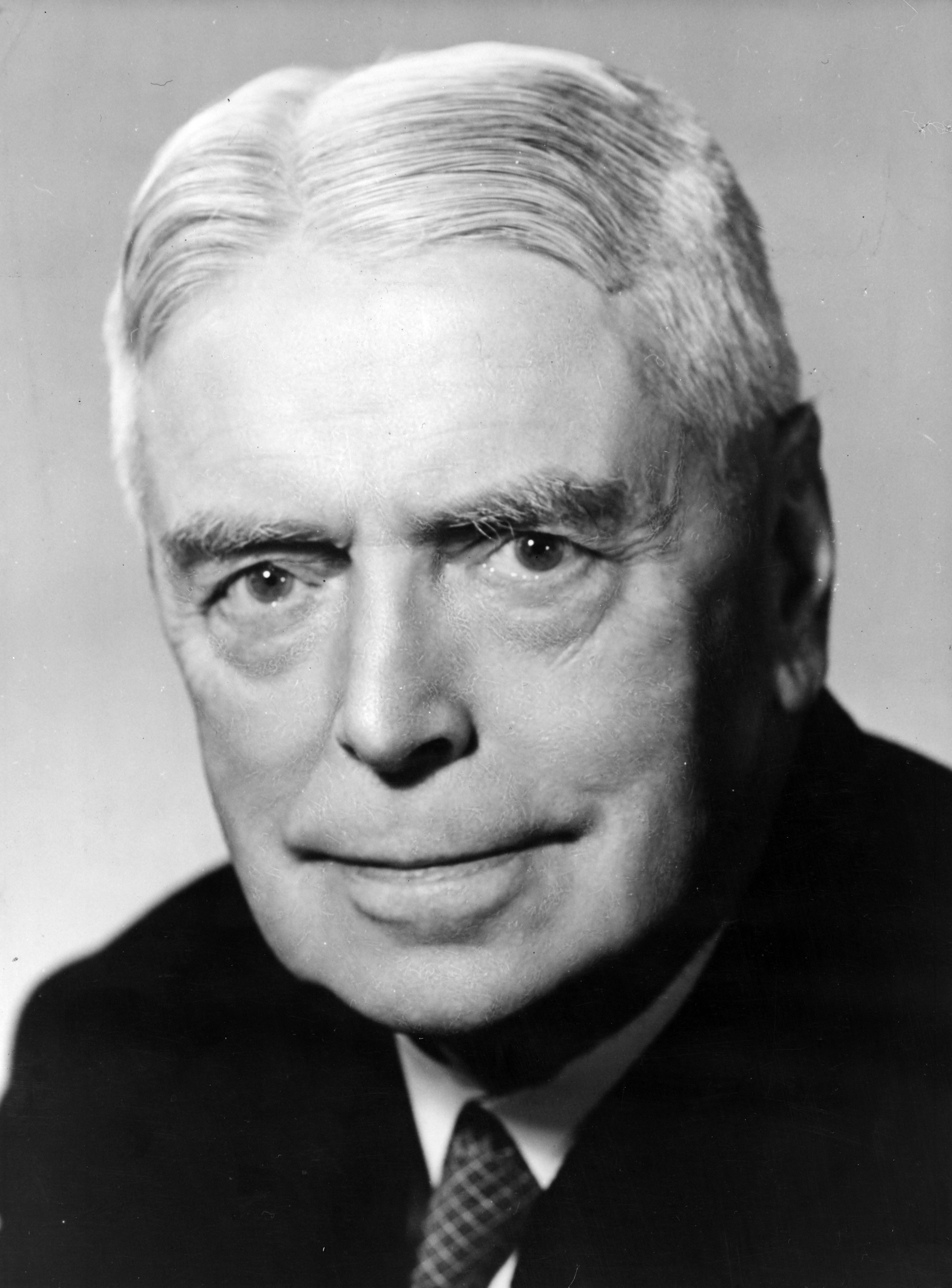
Walter Nash

77.252198°S 166.739187°E. A prominent peak 1.4 nautical miles (2.6 km; 1.6 mi) north of the Mount Bird summit in northwest Ross Island. The feature rises to over 1,600 metres (5,200 ft). Named by the New Zealand Geographic Board (NZGB) (2000) after Sir Walter Nash, who was deeply involved in promoting New Zealand's role in Antarctica and who signed the Antarctic Treaty for New Zealand as Prime Minister.

=== Wong Peak ===
77.251495°S 166.834328°E A peak 1.6 nautical miles (3.0 km; 1.8 mi) northeast of the summit of Mount Bird in northwest Ross Island. The feature rises to over 1,600 metres (5,200 ft). Named by New Zealand Geographic Board (NZGB) (2000) after Frank Wong.

=== Beeby Peak ===
77.257089°S 166.907954°E. A peak 2.4 nautical miles (4.4 km; 2.8 mi) east-northeast of the summit of Mount Bird in northwest Ross Island. The feature rises to about 1,400 metres (4,600 ft). Named by New Zealand Geographic Board (NZGB) (2000) after Chris Beeby.

== Western Features ==
Features near the coast to the west of Mount Bird include, from north to south,

=== Inclusion Hill ===
77°15′S 166°25′E. A prominent steeply conical hill, 335 metres (1,099 ft) high, between McDonald Beach and the Mount Bird icecap. It is a trachyte plug, in parts containing numerous inclusions of basalt. Explored and descriptively named by the NZGSAE, 1958-59.

=== Fitzgerald Hill ===
77°16′S 166°25′E. A hill, 230 metres (750 ft) high, standing west of Mount Bird between Fitzgerald Stream and Shell Glacier. Mapped by the NZGSAE, 1958-59, and named by the NZ-APC for E.B. Fitzgerald, deputy leader of the expedition.

=== Cinder Hill ===
77°17′S 166°26′E. A prominent dissected volcano, 305 metres (1,001 ft) high, consisting of layers of red basalt scoria and cinders and abundant olivine nodules, standing between Harrison Stream and Wilson Stream on the ice-free lower west slopes of Mount Bird. Mapped and descriptively named by the New Zealand Geological Survey Antarctic Expedition (NZGSAE), 1958-59.

=== Alexander Hill ===
77°17′S 166°25′E. A hill, 220 metres (720 ft) high, with a prominent seaward cliff face, lying south of Harrison Stream and Cinder Hill on the lower ice-free west slopes of Mount Bird. Mapped by the NZGSAE, 1958-59, and named by the NZ-APC for B.N. Alexander, a surveyor with the expedition.

=== Trachyte Hill ===
77°17′S 166°25′E. A prominent hill, 470 metres (1,540 ft) high, just south of Shell Glacier in the center of the ice-free area on the lower west slopes of Mount Bird. Mapped and so named by the NZGSAE, 1958-59, because of the rock type composing the hill.

== Southern features ==
=== Keys Hill ===
77.284701°S 166.589986°E. A hill, 1,100 metres (3,600 ft) high, located at the head of Shearwater Glacier, 2.2 nautical miles (4.1 km; 2.5 mi) west-southwest of the summit of Mount Bird in northwest Ross Island. Named by New Zealand Geographic Board (NZGB) (2000) after Gordon Keys, leader of long term NZAP atmospheric research, 1985-95.

=== Palais Bluff ===
77.311348°S 166.543478°E. An ice-free coastal bluff rising to over 400 metres (1,300 ft) high between the terminus of Shearwater Glacier and Quaternary Icefall in northwest Ross Island. The bluff overlooks Wohlschlag Bay. At the suggestion of P.R. Kyle, named by Advisory Committee on Antarctic Names (US-ACAN) (2000) after Julie Palais, Program Manager for Glaciology, Office of Polar Programs, NSF. As a Ph.D. student at Ohio State University, collected snow samples and short ice core on Ross Island to examine the volcanic record. She has made many trips to Antarctica.

=== Kea Nunataks ===
77.289588°S 166.858327°E. A line of several nunataks 1.2 nautical miles (2.2 km; 1.4 mi) southeast of the summit of Mount Bird. The feature trends NW-SE and is 1.5 nautical miles (2.8 km; 1.7 mi) long. Kea Nunataks is one of several features near Mount Bird assigned the native name of a New Zealand mountain bird. Named by New Zealand Geographic Board (NZGB), 2000.

=== Kaka Nunatak ===
77.286419°S 166.838939°E. The most prominent of the Kea Nunataks, rising to about 1,400 metres (4,600 ft) high near the center of the group. It stands 2 nautical miles (3.7 km; 2.3 mi) southeast of the summit of Mount Bird in northwest Ross Island. Kaka Nunatak is one of several features near Mount Bird assigned the native name of a New Zealand mountain bird. Named by New Zealand Geographic Board (NZGB), 2000.

=== Bird Saddle ===
77.378174°S 166.89418°E. The feature is one of three prominent snow saddles on Ross Island, this one at about 800 metres (2,600 ft) high between Mount Bird and Mount Erebus. Named in association with Mount Bird, which rises to 1,800 metres (5,900 ft) high to the north of this saddle.

== Coastal features ==
Coastal features around Mount Bird include Romanes Beach, McDonald Beach, Caughley Beach, Cape Bird Hut and Cape Bird.

=== Romanes Beach ===
77°17′S 166°22′E. Beach on the north shore of Wohlschlag Bay just south of Harrison Bluff. Mapped by a party of the NZGSAE, 1958-59, landed there by the USS Arneb. Named by the NZ-APC for W. Romanes, mountaineer assistant with the expedition.

=== McDonald Beach ===
77°15′S 166°21′E. An extensive beach lying west of Inclusion Hill and 6 nautical miles (11 km; 6.9 mi) southwest of Cape Bird. Named by the NZGSAE, 1958-59, after Captain Edwin A. McDonald, then Deputy Commander, United States Naval Support Force, Antarctica, who provided extensive transport and other facilities to the NZGSAE in support of the survey of the Cape Bird area.

=== Keys Point ===
77.241966°S 166.363249°E. A projecting point of land at McDonald Beach, 1 nautical mile (1.9 km; 1.2 mi) northwest of Inclusion Hill in northwest Ross Island. At the suggestion of P.R. Kyle, named by Advisory Committee on Antarctic Names (US-ACAN) after John R. (Harry) Keys, New Zealand geochemist who worked several seasons during the 1970s and 1980s under the auspices of NZAP and United States Antarctic Research Program (USARP) on investigations as to the origin of salts in the McMurdo Sound area, the Mount Erebus volcano, and the quantity, shapes, and sizes of icebergs in the Antarctic marine environment.

=== Harrison Bluff ===
77°17′S 166°23′E. A pale-colored trachyte headland forming the seaward termination of Trachyte Hill and marking the southern end of McDonald Beach on the western side of Mount Bird. Many skuas nest on the bluff. A survey station marked by a rock cairn was placed on the top of the northwest corner of the bluff by E.B. Fitzgerald of the Cape Bird Party of the NZGSAE, 1958-59. Named by the NZ-APC for J. Harrison, mountaineer-assistant with the expedition.

=== Waipuke Beach ===
77°14′S 166°24′E. Beach between McDonald and Caughley Beaches, lying 6 nautical miles (11 km; 6.9 mi) southwest of Cape Bird. So named by the NZGSAE, 1958-59, because of periodic flooding by meltwater from the Cape Bird icecap, which has been destructive to nearby penguin rookeries. Waipuke is the Maori word for flood.

=== Caughley Beach ===
77°14′S 166°25′E. The northernmost beach on the ice-free coast southwest of Cape Bird. Mapped by the NZGSAE, 1958-59, and named for Graeme Caughley, biologist with the party that visited Cape Bird.

=== Cape Bird ===
77°10′S 166°41′E. Cape which marks the north extremity of Ross Island. Discovered in 1841 by a British expedition under Ross, and named by him for Lieutenant Edward J. Bird of the ship Erebus.

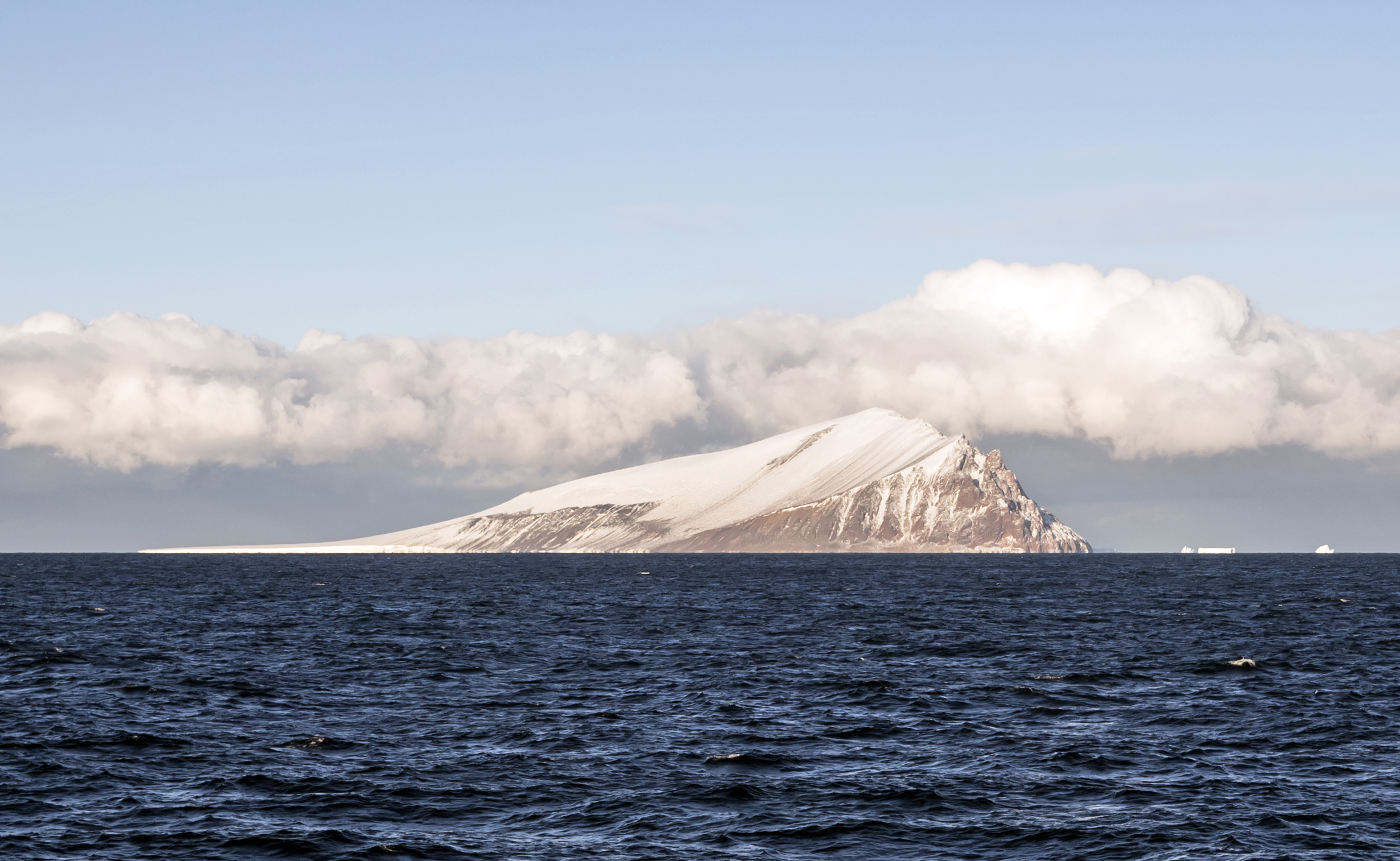
Beaufort Island

=== Beaufort Island ===
76°56′S 166°56′E. An island in the Ross Sea, the northernmost feature of the Ross Archipelago, lying 12 nautical miles (22 km; 14 mi) north of Cape Bird. Discovered and named in 1841 by Ross for Captain Francis Beaufort, Royal Navy, Hydrographer to the Admiralty.

== Sources ==
- Alberts, Fred G., ed. (1995), Geographic Names of the Antarctic (PDF) (2 ed.), United States Board on Geographic Names This article incorporates public domain material from websites or documents of the United States Board on Geographic Names.
- "Beeby Peak", Geographic Names Information System, United States Geological Survey, United States Department of the Interior
- "Bird Saddle", Geographic Names Information System, United States Geological Survey, United States Department of the Interior
- "Endeavour Piedmont Glacier", Geographic Names Information System, United States Geological Survey, United States Department of the Interior
- "Kaka Nunatak", Geographic Names Information System, United States Geological Survey, United States Department of the Interior
- "Kakapo Nunatak", Geographic Names Information System, United States Geological Survey, United States Department of the Interior
- "Kea Nunataks", Geographic Names Information System, United States Geological Survey, United States Department of the Interior
- "Keys Hill", Geographic Names Information System, United States Geological Survey, United States Department of the Interior
- "Keys Point", Geographic Names Information System, United States Geological Survey, United States Department of the Interior
- "Nash Peak", Geographic Names Information System, United States Geological Survey, United States Department of the Interior
- "Norman Crag", Geographic Names Information System, United States Geological Survey, United States Department of the Interior
- "Palais Bluff", Geographic Names Information System, United States Geological Survey, United States Department of the Interior
- Ross Island, USGS: United States Geological Survey
- "Ruru Crests", Geographic Names Information System, United States Geological Survey, United States Department of the Interior
- "Takahe Nunatak", Geographic Names Information System, United States Geological Survey, United States Department of the Interior
- "Wong Peak", Geographic Names Information System, United States Geological Survey, United States Department of the Interior
- Wright, A.C.; Kyle, P.R. (1990), "A.15. Mount Bird", in LeMasurier, W.E.; Thomson, J.W. (eds.), Volcanoes of the Antarctica Plate and Southern Oceans, Antarctica Research, vol. 48, American Geophysical Union, archived from the original on 2013-10-29

This article incorporates public domain material from websites or documents of the United States Geological Survey.
