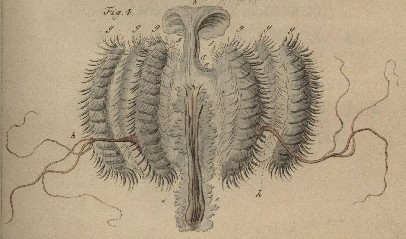

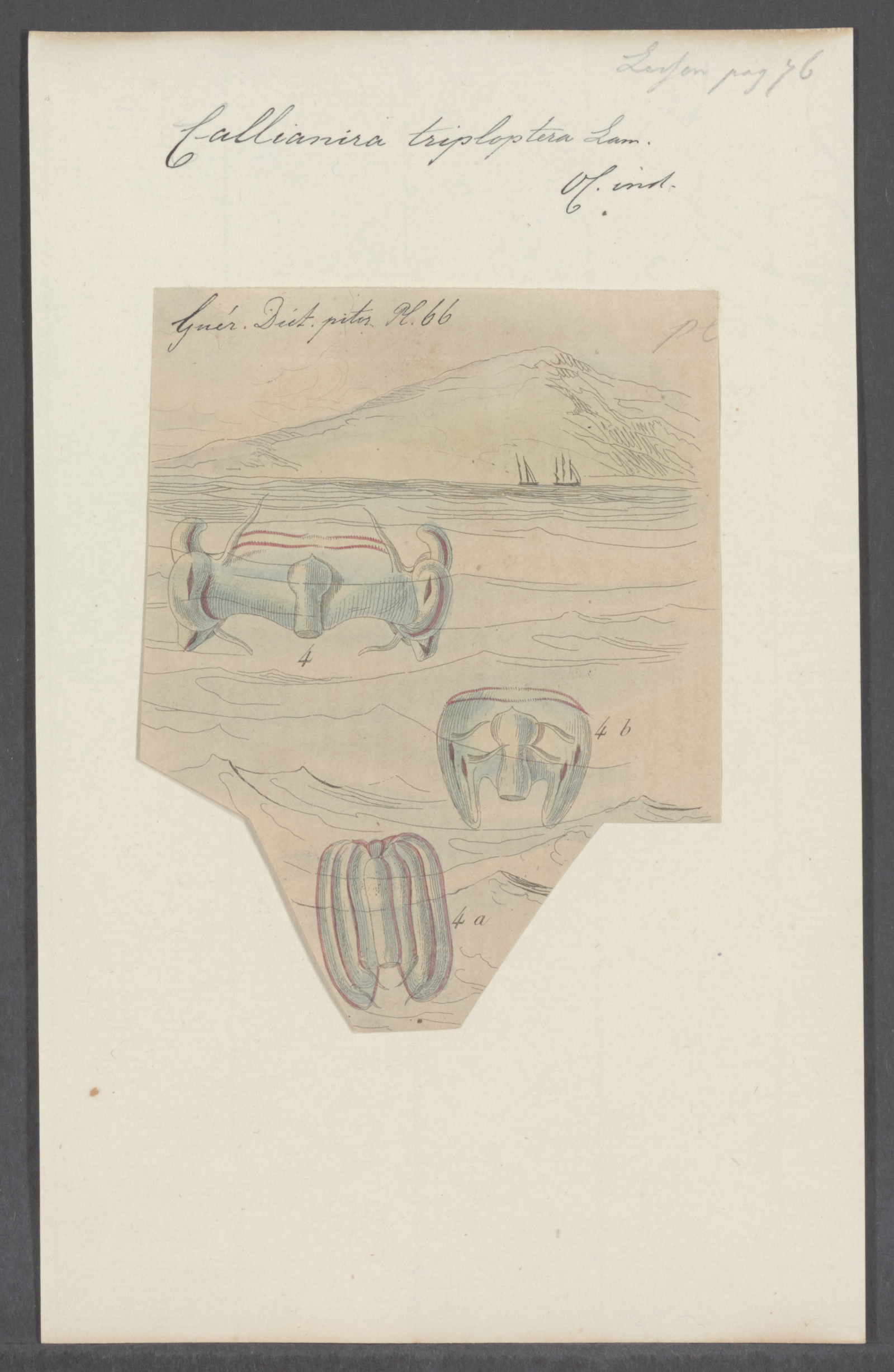

Scientific classification
- Kingdom: Animalia
- Phylum: Ctenophora
- Class: Tentaculata
- Order: Cydippida
- Family: Mertensiidae
- Genus: Callianira; Péron & Lesueur, 1808

= Callianira (ctenophore) =

Genus of ctenophores

Callianira is a genus of ctenophores belonging to the family Mertensiidae.

The species of this genus are found in Europe, Northern America, Southernmost Southern America, Antarctica.

Species:

- Callianira antarctica Chun, 1897
- Callianira bialata Delle Chiaje, 1841
- Callianira compressa (Mertens, 1833)
- Callianira cristata Moser, 1909
- Callianira diploptera Lamarck, 1816
- Callianira ficalbi Curreri, 1900
- Callianira triploptera Lamarck, 1816
- Callianira hexagona (Bruguière, 1789)
