= Alexander Postels =

Russian scientist and artist (1801–1871)

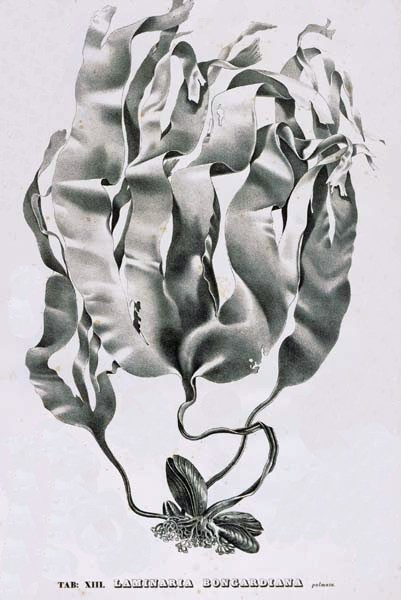
Laminaria bongardiana by Postels

Alexander Filippovich Postels (Russian: Александр Филиппович Постельс; 24 August 1801 in Dorpat – 28 June 1871 in Vyborg) was a Russian naturalist, mineralogist and artist of Baltic German descent.

== Career ==
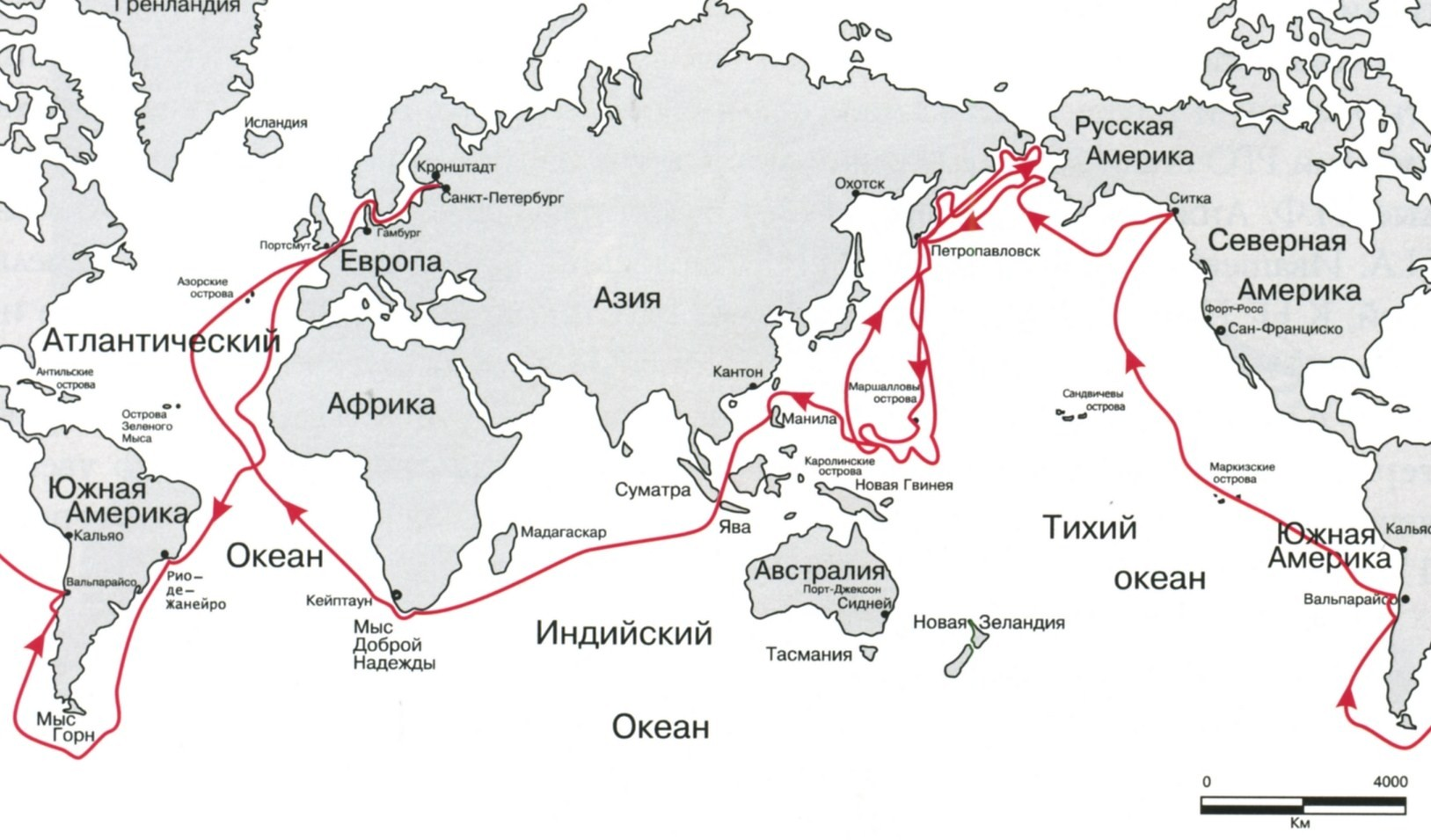
Voyage of the Senyavin

Postels studied at St.Petersburg Imperial University and in 1826 lectured there on inorganic chemistry.

In the 1820s political relations between Russia and the United States were troubled by the extent of Russian territory in North America. Russia intended to enforce its claims by sending two warships to the disputed areas. When the two countries agreed on 54°40′N as the southern limit of Russian claims, Tsar Nicolas I changed their orders in 1826 to an extended three-year survey of the Russian-American and Asian coasts.

Otto von Kotzebue had returned on 10 July 1826 from his voyage of discovery aboard Predpriyatiye. On 16 August 1826, Captain Lieutenant Fedor Petrovich Litke, sailed on board the Russian vessel Senyavin, accompanied by the Möller under Captain Lieutenant M. N. Staniukovich. Postels sailed with Litke as a naturalist/artist and had the distinction of being the first St. Petersburg University graduate to join such a large-scale expedition. On board were also the naturalist Karl Heinrich Mertens (1796–1830), who died in Kronstadt shortly after his return from Iceland and another trip on the Senyavin, and the ornithologist Baron von Kittlitz. Their orders were to:

reconnoitre and describe the coasts of Kamchatka, the land of the Chuchkis and the Koriaks (the coasts of which have not yet been described by anyone, and which are unknown except by the voyage of Captain Bering); the coasts of the Okhotsk Sea, and the Shantar Islands, which although they are known to us, have not been sufficiently described.

The expedition sailed from Kronstadt, the Russian port on Kotlin Island, via Portsmouth and rounded Cape Horn on 24 February 1827. The Senyavin called at Concepcion in Chile, before sailing north to Sitka, and arriving at Petropavlovsk in mid-September. They explored the Caroline Islands and the Bonin-Jima group for four months, returning to Kamchatka in May. During the summer they sailed from Avacha Bay to Karaginskii Island and on through the Bering Strait to reconnoitre the coast as far north as the Anadyr River. They returned via Manila and the Cape of Good Hope, arriving back in Kronstadt on 16 September 1829.

The expedition was called the largest and most productive voyage of discovery of the era, and brought back some 4 000 natural history specimens, including mammals, insects, birds, plants, and minerals. More than 1250 sketches of their findings were made on the voyage. Twelve island groups were discovered along the Asian coast, and 26 Caroline Islands were explored and described. The flattening of the Earth's poles was investigated using an invariable pendulum. Postels was appointed assistant-professor of the Department of Mineralogy and Geology of St.Petersburg University. During the voyage Postels depicted more than 100 seaweeds or marine algae from the northern Pacific in "Illustrationes algarum in itinere circa orbem jussu Imperatoriis Nicolai I" published in St. Petersburg in 1840. The seaweed genus Postelsia is named in his honour. This botanist is denoted by the author abbreviation Postels when citing a botanical name.

Postels was elected an Honorary Member of the Russian Academy of Sciences on 14 January 1866 and invited to act as curator of the Mineralogical Museum. He tutored the Grand Duchesses Maria and Ekaterina, daughters of Tsar Nicolas I's brother Mikhail, and was the tutor of Prince Oldenburgski's children.

== See also ==
- European and American voyages of scientific exploration

== Sources ==
- "Постельс, Александр Филиппович" . Brockhaus and Efron Encyclopedic Dictionary (in Russian). 1906.
