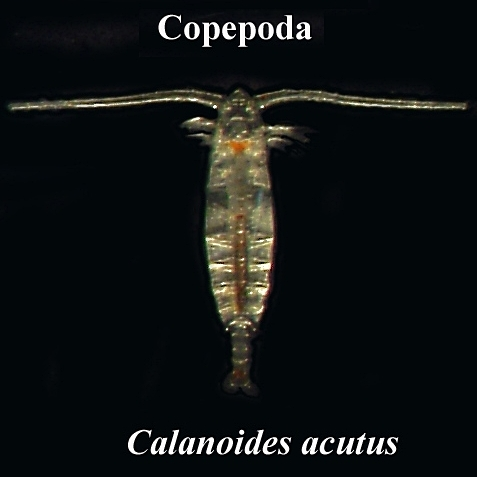

Scientific classification
- Domain: Eukaryota
- Kingdom: Animalia
- Phylum: Arthropoda
- Class: Copepoda
- Order: Calanoida
- Family: Calanidae
- Genus: Calanoides
- Species: C. acutus

Binomial name
- Calanoides acutus (Giesbrecht, 1902)

= Calanoides acutus =

Species of crustacean

Calanoides acutus is a copepod found in Antarctica and the surrounding waters.

== Description ==
The female ranges from about 3.5 to 5.7 millimetres (0.14 to 0.22 in), and the male has an average length of about 4.6 millimetres (0.18 in).

== Distribution ==
Calanoides acutus is found in Antarctic and sub-Antarctic waters, from sea level to 1,000 metres (3,300 ft) in depth.

== Ecology ==
=== Life history and reproduction ===
While C. acutus is only confirmed to breed from November to March, it likely starts breeding in early October, as a study observed females without eggs and late-stage nauplii presumably belonging to this copepod in mid-November. Stage I through III copepodites are generally found from sea level to 100 metres (330 ft) of depth. Older stages, on the other hand, are found in the top 200 metres (660 ft) during the summer, except during December, when they are found in the top 100 metres (330 ft). C. acutus starts to descend in February, although this is affected by the food supply, with individuals in the northern portion of the range, like in Drake Passage, only starting to winter during mid-March. Individuals, mainly stage IV and V copepodites, winter to between about 500 and 1,000 metres (1,600 and 3,300 ft). There is no evidence of diel vertical migration in this species.
