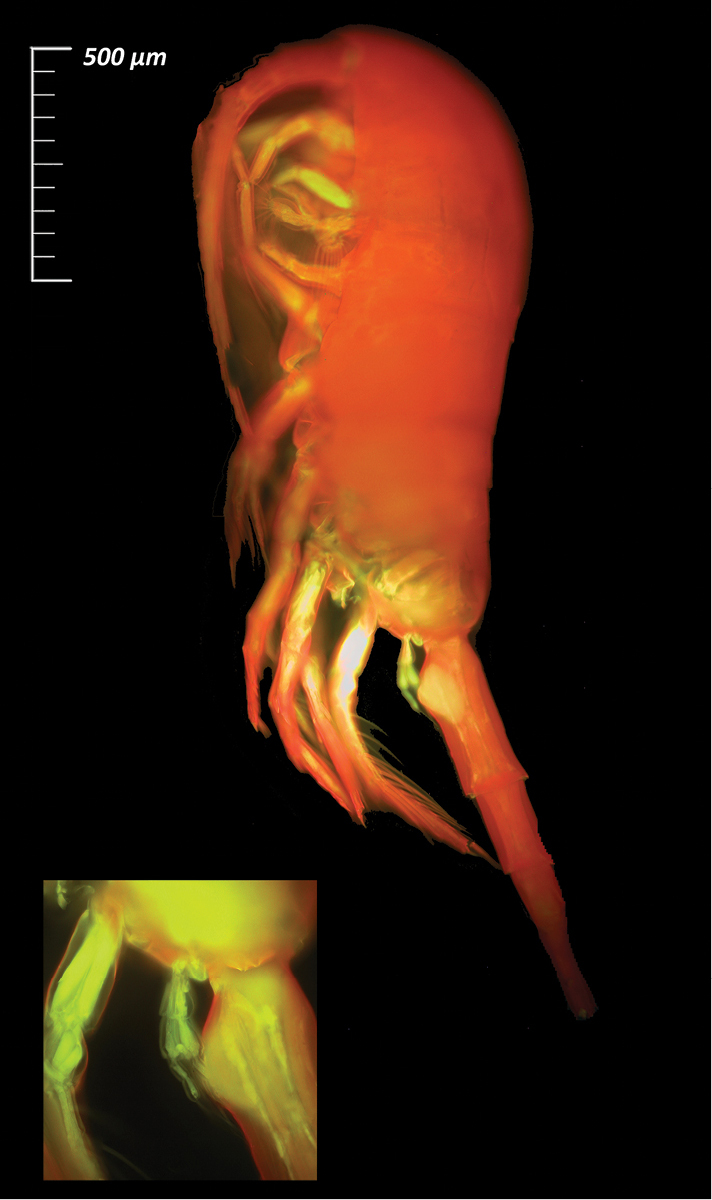

Scientific classification
- Domain: Eukaryota
- Kingdom: Animalia
- Phylum: Arthropoda
- Class: Copepoda
- Order: Calanoida
- Family: Metridinidae
- Genus: Metridia
- Species: M. gerlachei

Binomial name
- Metridia gerlachei Giesbrecht, 1902

= Metridia gerlachei =

Species of crustacean

Metridia gerlachei is a copepod found primarily in Antarctic and sub-Antarctic waters.

== Description ==
In length, the female M. gerlachei is between about 3.25 and 4.3 millimetres (0.128 and 0.169 in) with a mean of 3.8 millimetres (0.15 in). The male is smaller, between about 2.15 and 2.7 millimetres (0.085 and 0.106 in) and averaging 2.55 millimetres (0.100 in) in length.

== Distribution ==
Metridia gerlachei is found primarily in Antarctic and sub-Antarctic waters, in addition to records from the southern Atlantic, Pacific, and Indian Oceans.

== Ecology ==
=== Life cycle and reproduction ===
Metridia gerlachei may start to reproduce during late winter (Note: All seasons are for the Southern Hemisphere.) or early spring and stops during mid-winter (although a more conservative estimate gives from December to April). Breeding peaks in December and January due to the abundance of phytoplankton. It has a relatively low egg production rate of about 6 eggs per day at saturated food concentrations.

=== Vertical distribution ===
During summer, most of the population is found from the surface to 300 metres (980 ft) in depth. The population is evenly distributed throughout the water column in autumn and winter. It then becomes concentrated between 200 and 1,000 metres (660 and 3,280 ft) in depth during spring. During the day, M. gerlachei is concentrated below 200 metres (660 ft). It starts to ascend to the surface when the decrease in light is maximal, reaching the surface a few hours later. The most feeding occurs at this point. The descent starts right after this, and ends when the increase in light reaches its maximum. The population is usually concentrated within 50 metres (160 ft) of depth during this diel vertical migration.

=== Feeding ===
Metridia gerlachei is omnivorous, eating mainly phytoplankton, but also copepod eggs, Oncaea curvata, and other animal matter.
