= Johan Erhard Areschoug =

Swedish botanist (1811–1887)

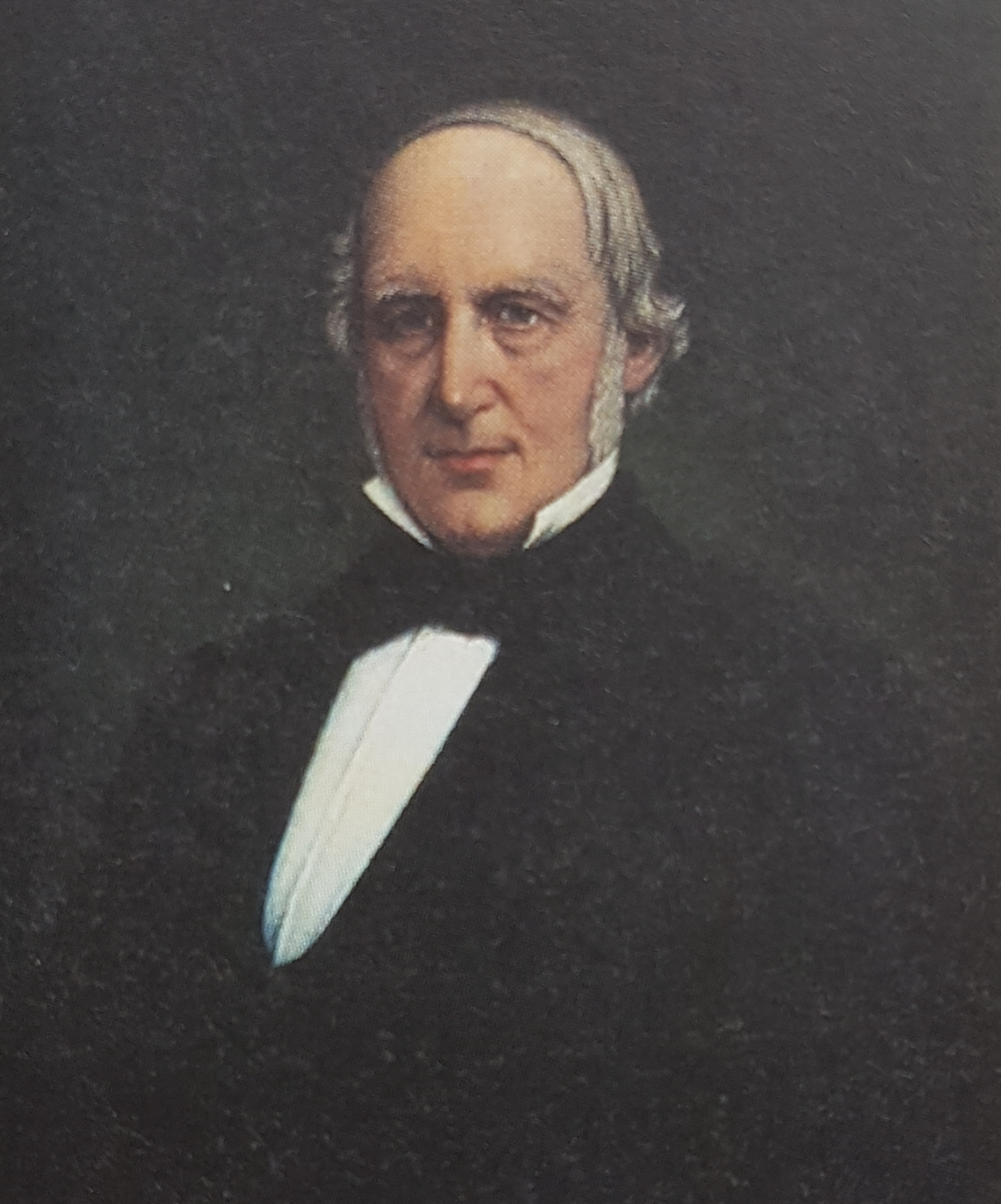
Johan Areschoug

Johan Erhard Areschoug (Johannes Erhard Areschoug, Philos. Doctor, Botanices et Oeconomiae) (16 September 1811 – 7 May 1887) was a Swedish botanist who was a native of Gothenburg. He was a member of the Arreskow family (in Swedish). His first name is sometimes recorded as "John".

He studied natural sciences at the University of Lund, where in 1838 he earned his doctorate in philosophy. In 1859 he succeeded Elias Magnus Fries (1794-1878) as professor of botany at the University of Uppsala, a position he maintained until 1876. In 1851, he was elected a member of the Royal Swedish Academy of Sciences.

Areschoug performed extensive field studies of Scandinavian cryptogams, being remembered for his work in the field of phycology. Since 1836 he edited exsiccatae devoted to Scandinavian algae, the largest series with the title Algae Scandinavicae exsiccatae quas adjectis Characeis distribuit John Ehrh. Areschoug. Serie novae (1861-1879).

The red algae genus Areschougia from the family Areschougiaceae is named in his honor.

== Selected publications ==
- Symbolae Algarum rar. Florae scandinavicae (1838).
- Iconographia phycologica (1847).
- Phyceae scanidnavicae marinae (1850).
- Observationes phycologicae (1883).
