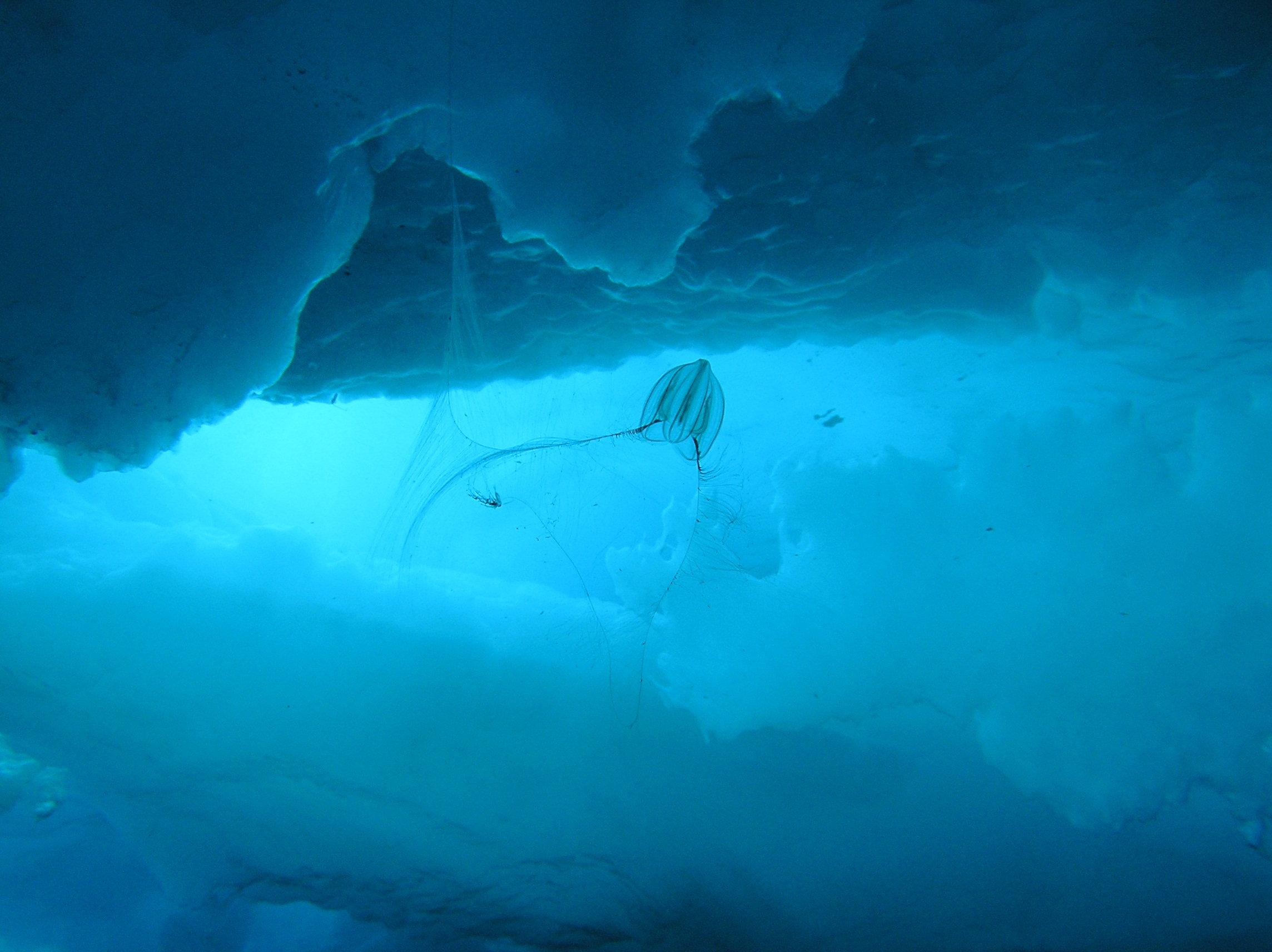
- Sea nut in an icy ocean
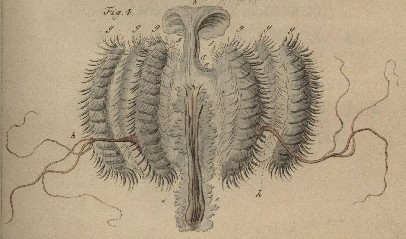
- Callianira hexagona

Scientific classification
- Kingdom: Animalia
- Phylum: Ctenophora
- Class: Tentaculata
- Order: Cydippida
- Family: Mertensiidae

= Mertensiidae =

Family of comb jellies

Mertensiidae is a family of ctenophores belonging to the order Cydippida.

Genera:

- Callianira Péron & Lesueur, 1808
- Charistephane Chun, 1879
- Gastrodes Korotneff, 1888
- Mertensia Lesson, 1830
