= Notonecta insulata =

Scientific classification
- Domain: Eukaryota
- Kingdom: Animalia
- Phylum: Arthropoda
- Class: Insecta
- Order: Hemiptera
- Suborder: Heteroptera
- Family: Notonectidae
- Genus: Notonecta
- Species: N. insulata

Binomial name
- Notonecta insulata Kirby, 1837

Species of true bug

Notonecta insulata is a species of backswimmer in the family Notonectidae. It is found in North America.
