= Notonecta borealis =

Scientific classification
- Domain: Eukaryota
- Kingdom: Animalia
- Phylum: Arthropoda
- Class: Insecta
- Order: Hemiptera
- Suborder: Heteroptera
- Family: Notonectidae
- Genus: Notonecta
- Species: N. borealis

Binomial name
- Notonecta borealis Hussey, 1919

Species of true bug

Notonecta borealis is a species of backswimmer in the family Notonectidae. It is found in North America.
