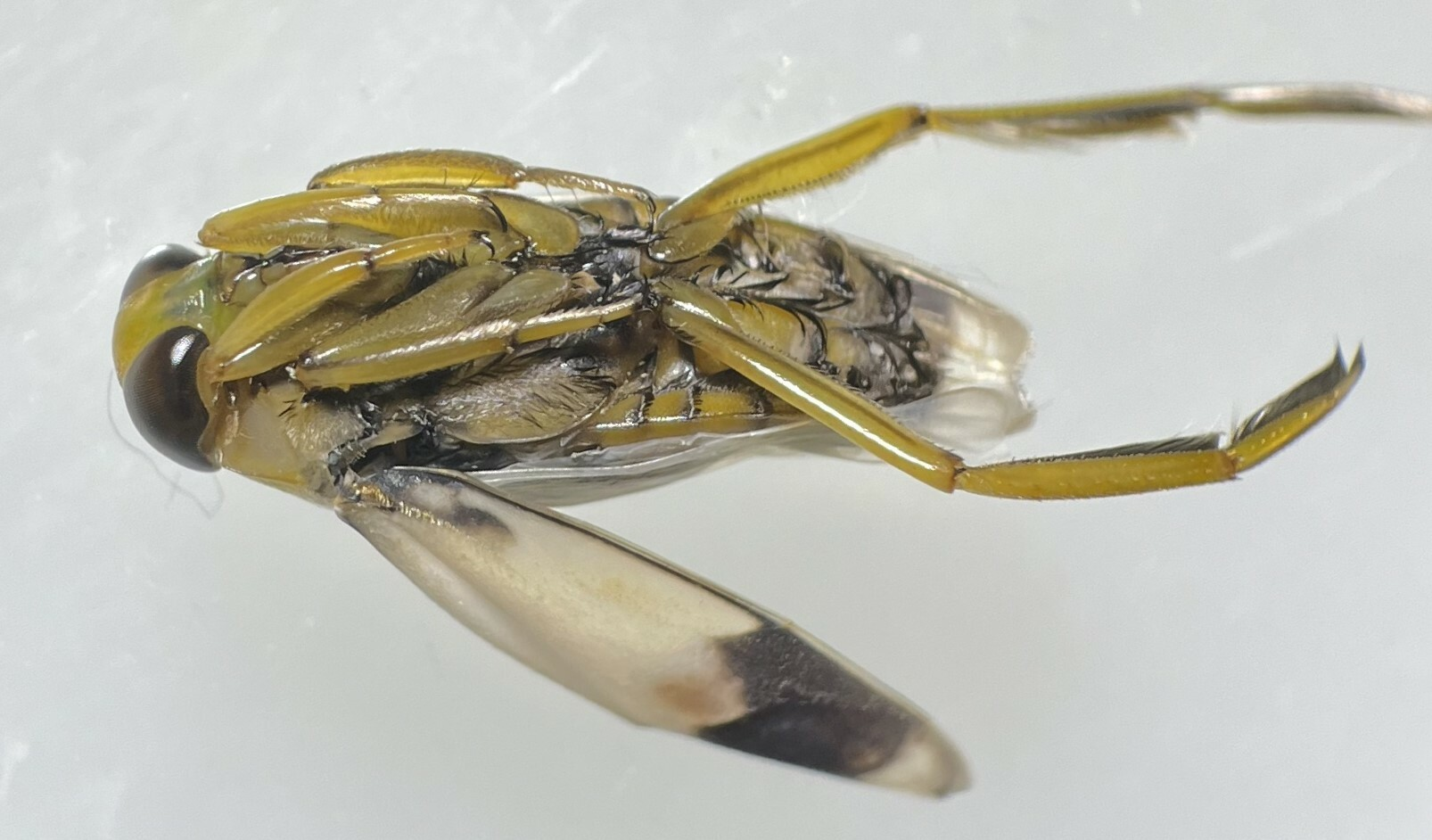

Scientific classification
- Kingdom: Animalia
- Phylum: Arthropoda
- Class: Insecta
- Order: Hemiptera
- Suborder: Heteroptera
- Family: Notonectidae
- Genus: Notonecta
- Species: N. indica

Binomial name
- Notonecta indica Linnaeus, 1771

= Notonecta indica =

Species of true bug

Notonecta indica is a species of backswimmer in the family Notonectidae. It is found in the Caribbean Sea, Central America, North America, Oceania, and South America.
