= Notonecta unifasciata =

Scientific classification
- Kingdom: Animalia
- Phylum: Arthropoda
- Clade: Pancrustacea
- Class: Insecta
- Order: Hemiptera
- Suborder: Heteroptera
- Family: Notonectidae
- Genus: Notonecta
- Species: N. unifasciata

Binomial name
- Notonecta unifasciata Guérin-Méneville, 1857

Synonyms
- Notonecta badia Pierce, 1948

Species of insect

Notonecta unifasciata is a species of backswimmer in the family Notonectidae. It is found in Central America, North America, and South America.

== Subspecies ==
These three subspecies belong to the species Notonecta unifasciata:

- Notonecta unifasciata andersoni Hungerford, 1934
- Notonecta unifasciata cochisiana Hungerford, 1934
- Notonecta unifasciata unifasciata Guérin-Méneville, 1857
