= Martarega mexicana =

Scientific classification
- Domain: Eukaryota
- Kingdom: Animalia
- Phylum: Arthropoda
- Class: Insecta
- Order: Hemiptera
- Suborder: Heteroptera
- Family: Notonectidae
- Genus: Martarega
- Species: M. mexicana

Binomial name
- Martarega mexicana Truxal, 1949

Species of true bug

Martarega mexicana is a species of backswimmer in the family Notonectidae. It is found in Central America and North America.
