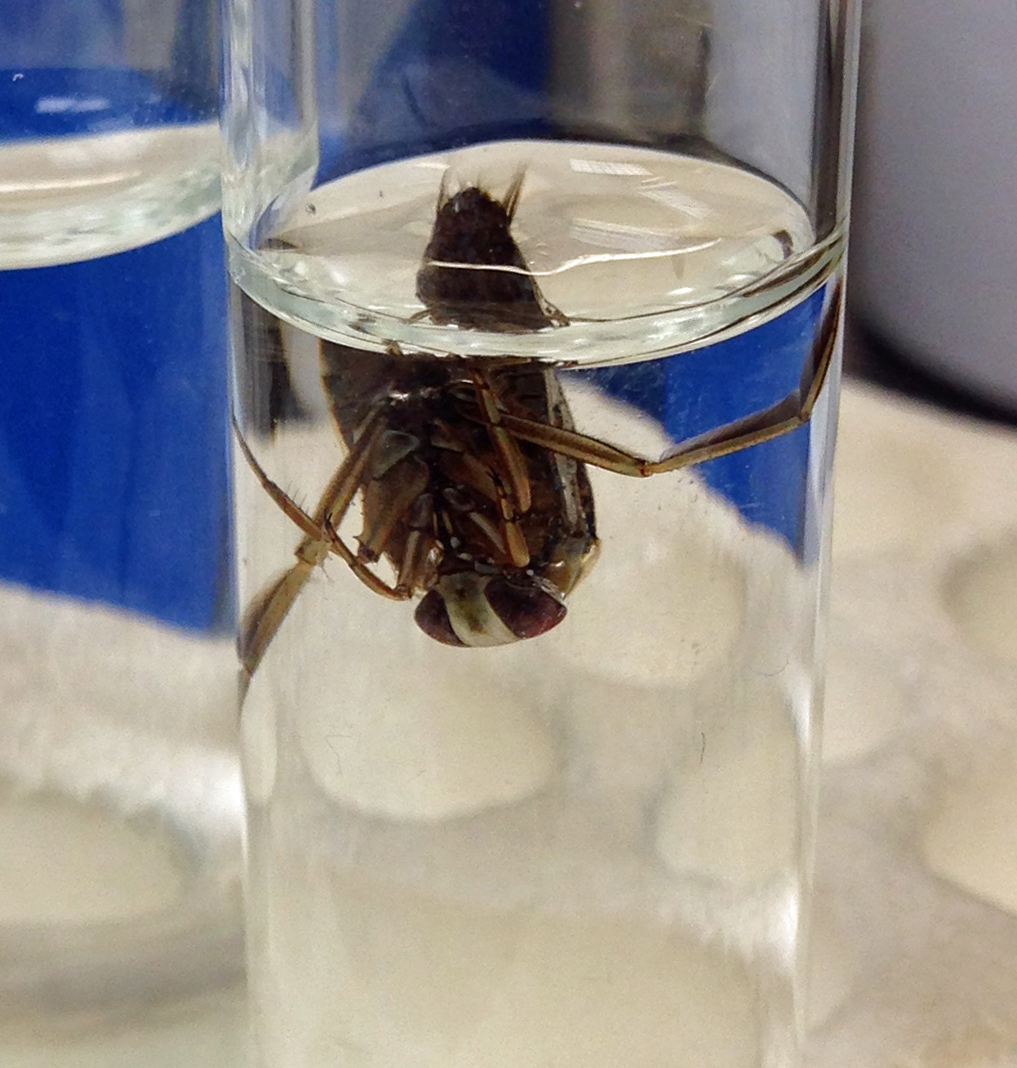

Scientific classification
- Kingdom: Animalia
- Phylum: Arthropoda
- Class: Insecta
- Order: Hemiptera
- Suborder: Heteroptera
- Family: Notonectidae
- Genus: Notonecta
- Species: N. irrorata

Binomial name
- Notonecta irrorata Uhler, 1879

= Notonecta irrorata =

Species of true bug

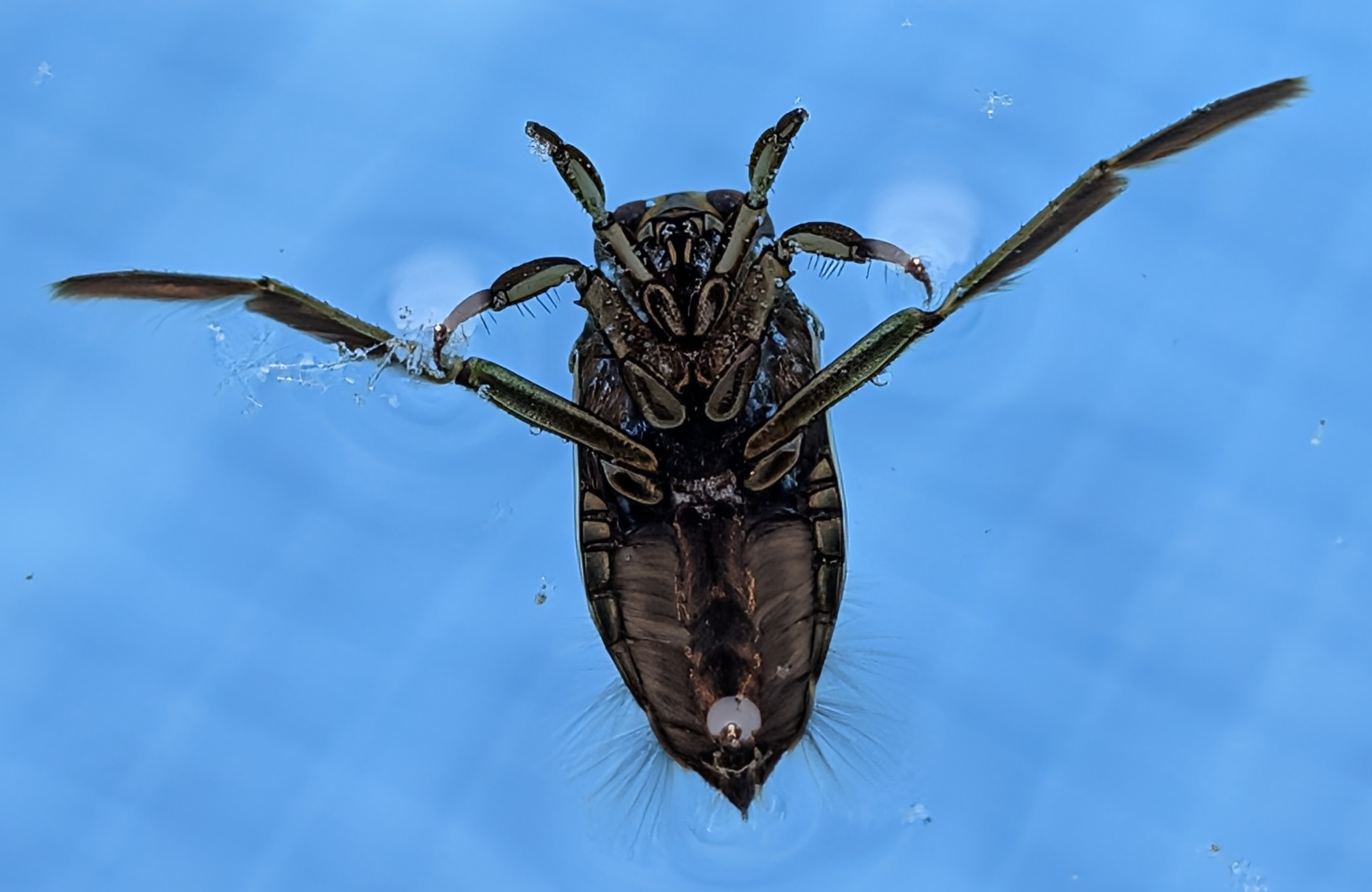
Adult individual of a N. irrorata

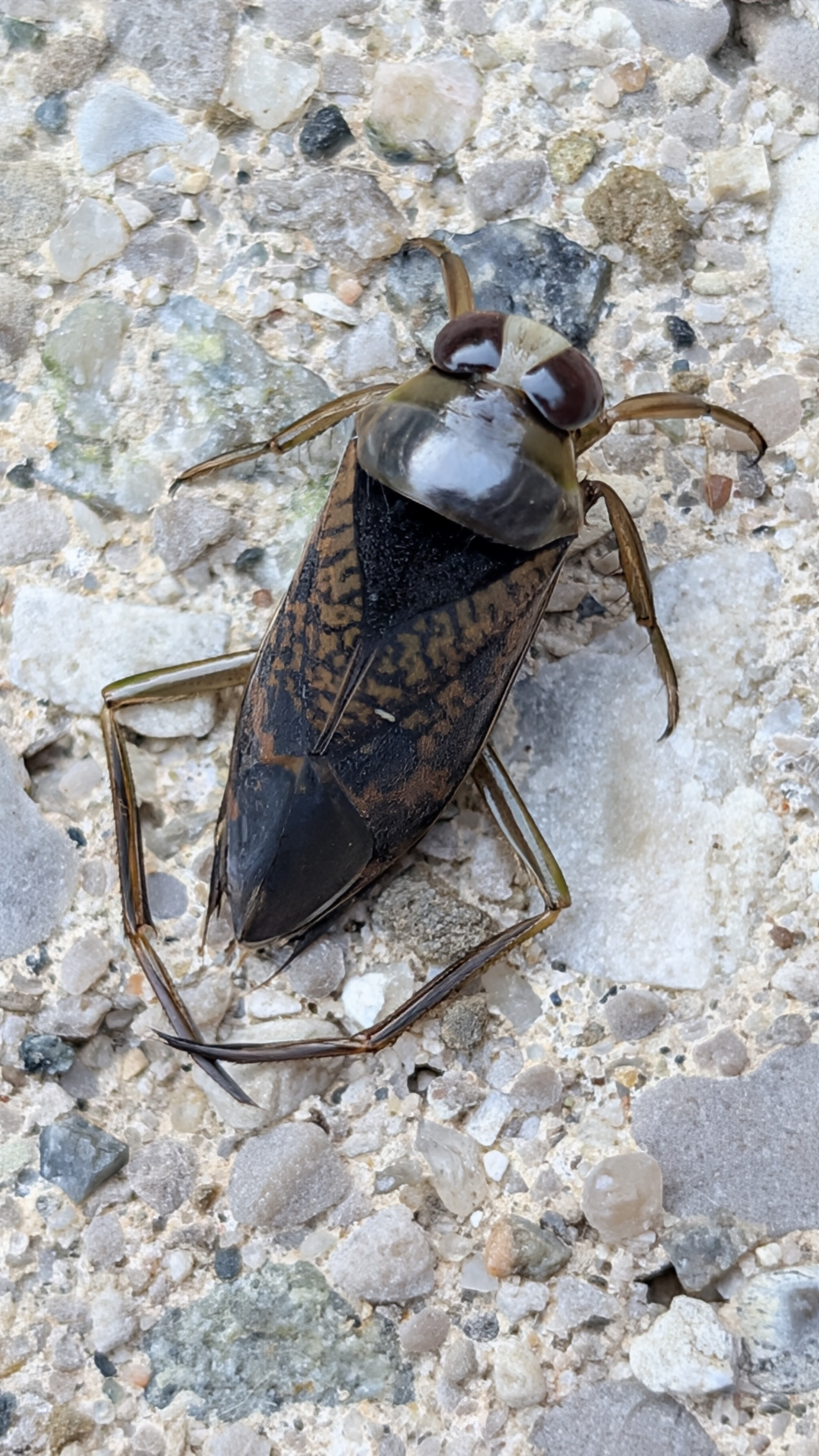
backswimmer bug N. irrorata

Notonecta irrorata is a species of backswimmer native to North America first described by Philip Reese Uhler in 1879. Presence of N. irrorata in ponds is known to repel the oviposition of Culex mosquitoes.
