= Notonecta undulata =

Scientific classification
- Kingdom: Animalia
- Phylum: Arthropoda
- Class: Insecta
- Order: Hemiptera
- Suborder: Heteroptera
- Family: Notonectidae
- Genus: Notonecta
- Species: N. undulata

Binomial name
- Notonecta undulata Say, 1832

Species of true bug

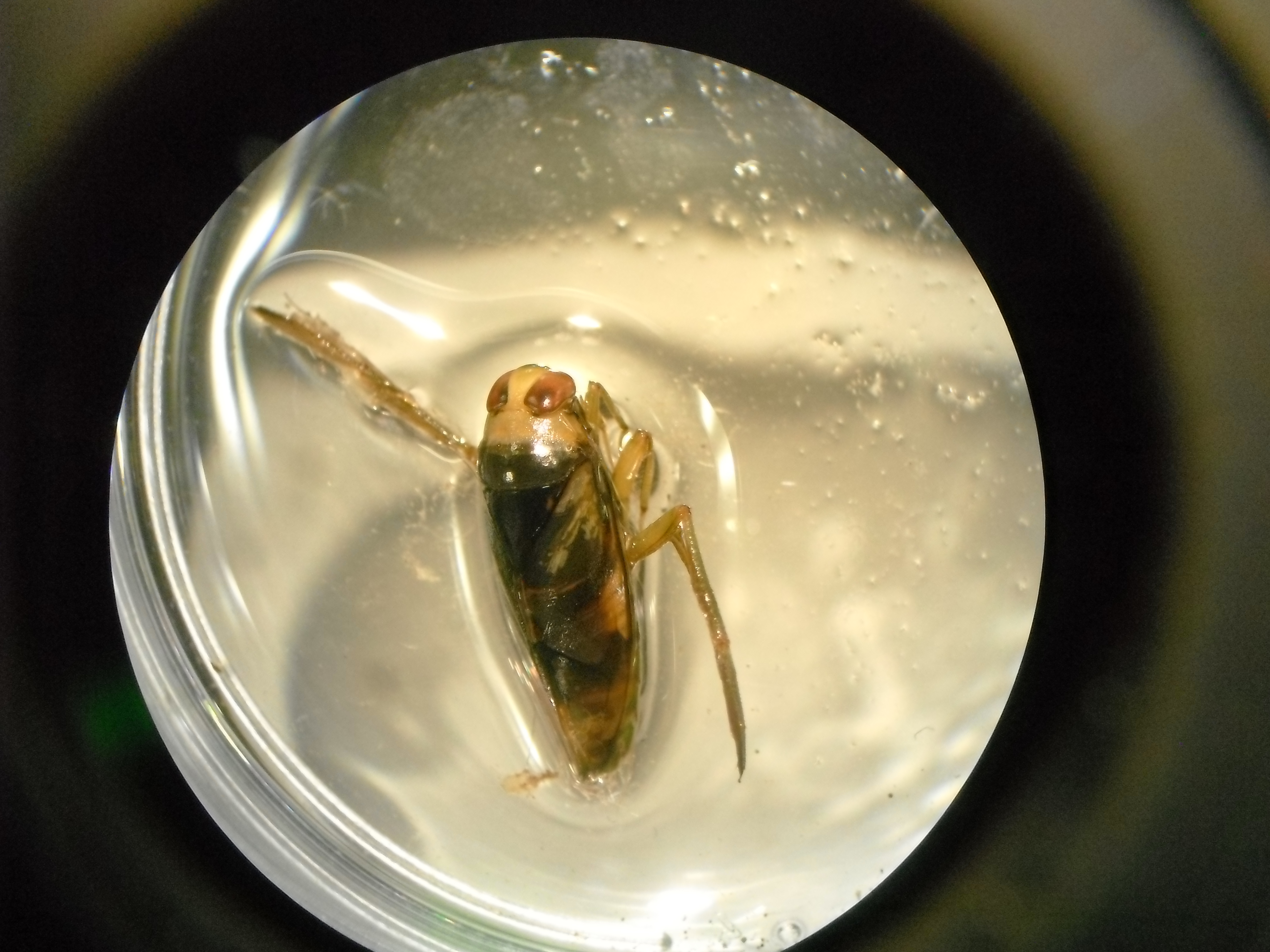
An image of a species of backswimmer under a microscope.

Notonecta undulata, also known by the common name grousewinged backswimmer, are from the family Notonectidae and the insect suborder Heteroptera. They are a type of hemipteran or true bug. These aquatic insects typically spend their time at the water's surface, using their abdomen and legs to cling to the underside of the surface tension. The Grousewinged backswimmer can be found in both lotic and lentic environments; however, they typically prefer small ponds and lakes where the water is slow-moving with less current. They swim upside down looking for prey. Once they stop swimming they float back up to the surface. These insects can be distinguished from water boatman or Corixidae by their segmented beak and front legs. Water boatman have highly modified front legs whereas backswimmers do not. Backswimmers are distributed across a broad range throughout North America. However, the species Notonecta undulata has only been documented and studied in southern Manitoba, Saskatchewan, Alberta and the western United States. N. undulata differs from other backswimmers by their antennae and size. They are approximately 10–12 mm long, and their antennae are 4 segmented.

== Taxonomy and morphology ==
Notonecta undulata is the Linnaean name for the grousewinged backswimmer. This species is classified as a true bug under the suborder Heteroptera. They are located under the family Notonectidae, which is divided into two subfamilies: Notonectinae and Anisopinae. Individuals that are in the subfamily Notonectinae are distinguishable from their Anisopinae relatives by their 4-segmented beak and antennae. Insects from the subfamily Notonectinae are also larger, approximately 10–16 mm in length. N. undulata measure 10–12 mm. Grousewinged backswimmers can range from a dull greenish yellow to black. The head of back is convex and the antennae are short and concealed beneath the eye. The scutellum is usually black with pale spots on the sides and at the apex. The hind tibiae and tarsus have dense bristle like hairs that make them appear oar-like. This allows them to be efficient swimmers; however, it has been documented that members of the genus Notonecta are not as good at swimming as Buenoa sp. The front and middle tarsi have apical claws; however, the hind tarsi are clawless. There are 5 points on the backswimmer that allow it to attach to the surface film of the water. These 5 points include the anterior legs and the abdomen of the insect. There are receptors associated with each of these points that help the insect in locomotion and capturing prey. Grousewinged backswimmers also lack ocelli. The need to detect light was mostly likely lost through natural selection due to a variety of environmental pressures. Their beak is stout and the ventral surface of the abdomen has a prominent hairy keel. The front and middle legs are approximately one half shorter than the hind legs and the femur is enlarged basally. The wing membrane also has a large black spot on the median line and the hemelytra are pale.

Prior to 1917, there had been no complete description of the Notonecta genus until H. B. Hungerford described the species N. undulata under the Kansas University Science Bulletin. Today, the species N. undulata is not well documented. Scientific literature and taxonomy referenced range between the 1920s and 1970s, with only a few articles published after the 1990s. Taxonomic classification of the species remains similar today as it did 40 years ago.

== Habitat and ecology ==
N. undulata typically inhabit ponds and lakes but have been known to occupy small streams or rivers when resources become limited or competition in lentic environments is too high. Backswimmers will maximize conditions by flying and seeking out areas to settle. It has also been tested that the Grousewinged backswimmer will have a higher dispersal rate when predation levels increase in the environment. Ponds have a greater surface area to volume ratio of vegetation than lakes which increases the amount of hiding places and food for the insect. This makes ponds one of the best locations for the backswimmer. These insects may prefer ponds because the distribution of N. undualata depends on food supply. It has been found that ponds and wetlands have a higher diversity of organisms which is often related to nutrient and food resources. Temperature can also affect the distribution of Grousewinged backswimmers. Scientific study has shown that N. undulata is capable of surviving over a wide range of temperatures and conditions. They have been known to withstand temperatures ranging from 4 to 32 °C and water hardness between 28 and 220 ppm. In nature, they will avoid temperatures higher than 32 °C by flying and searching out new locations; however, they can withstand them for short periods of time through the use of their cuticular lipid monolayer. This physiological adaptation allows them to uptake water and avoid dehydration when temperatures get too high. The pH level of water can also affect the backswimmer's choice of habitat or niche. N. undulata has been documented to prefer pH levels between 6.0 and 7.1, a relatively normal water acidity. Environmental factors such as pH, temperature and trophic interactions affect the ecology of the Grousewinged backswimmer.

Predator prey interactions are another factor affecting backswimmer ecology. Notonecta are generalist predators that attack and consume many types of aquatic invertebrates and terrestrial prey that fall on the surface of the water. They are known to prey on small crustaceans, nymphs and adults of corixids, dragonfly nymphs, caddisflies and fish eggs. Specifically, N. undulata prefers to eat mosquito larvae over any other type of invertebrate. Studies have been conducted between the Grousewinged backswimmer and Aedes aegypti, a type of mosquito that has been known to act as a vector for malaria and yellow fever. As a consequence, N. undulata has been suggested as a prudent biological control.

== Reproduction ==
The grousewinged backswimmer is bivoltine. Females of the first generation become adults and reproductively mature in July producing a second generation. The adults that become mature after July enter reproductive diapause which ends by late October. All N. undulata will overwinter in the adult stage and begin depositing eggs in the early spring. Eggs develop through 5 nymphal instars during the spring and summer. The preoviposition period lasts 16 days and eggs tend to be laid in ponds or calmer lakes rather than fast-flowing streams. The eggs are attached to plants or other suspended objects within the water column. They are elongate ovals, usually 1.7 mm x 0.6 mm. The incubation period lasts 5–14 days and oviposition is continuous in summer.

== Gallery ==
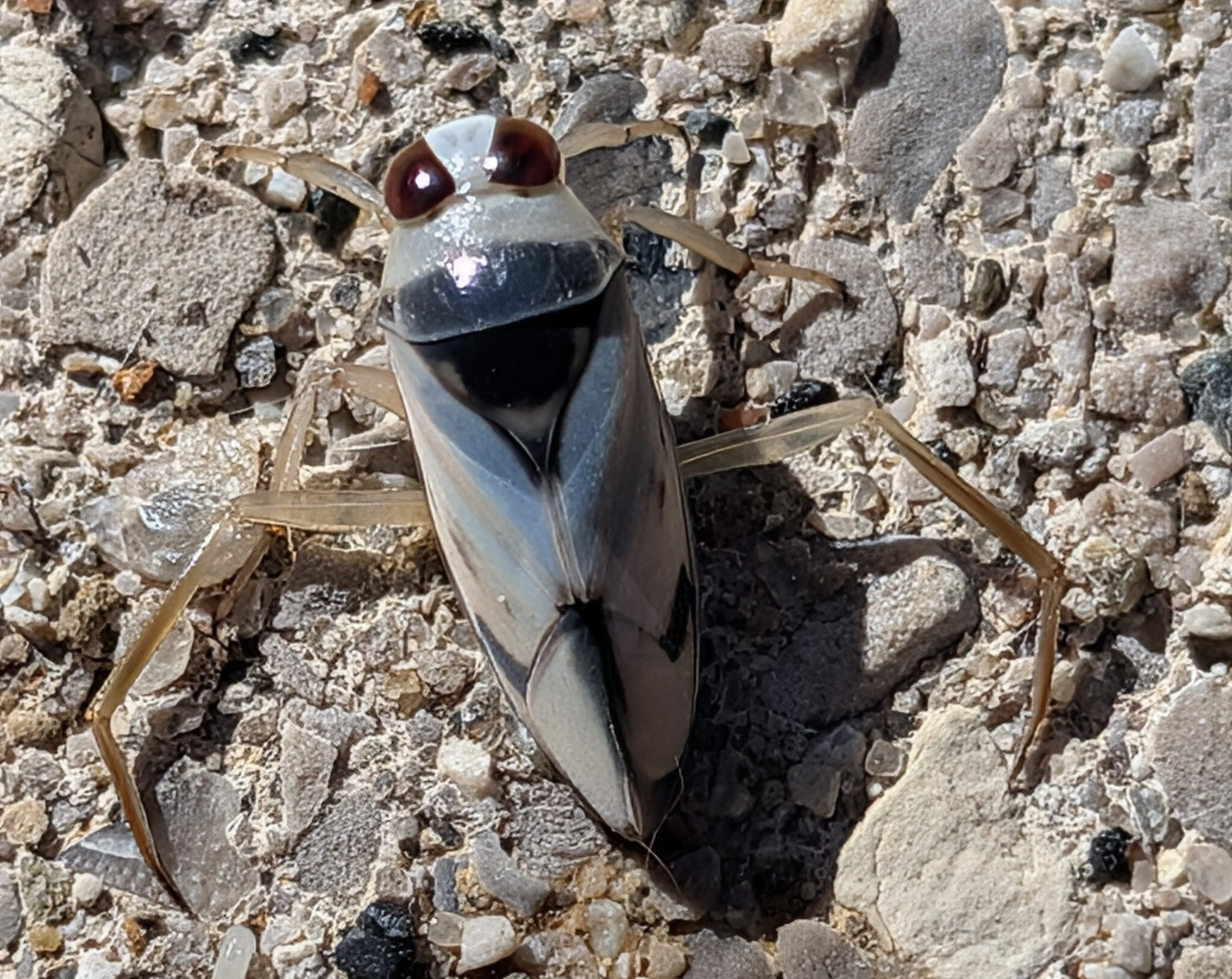
Notonecta undulata

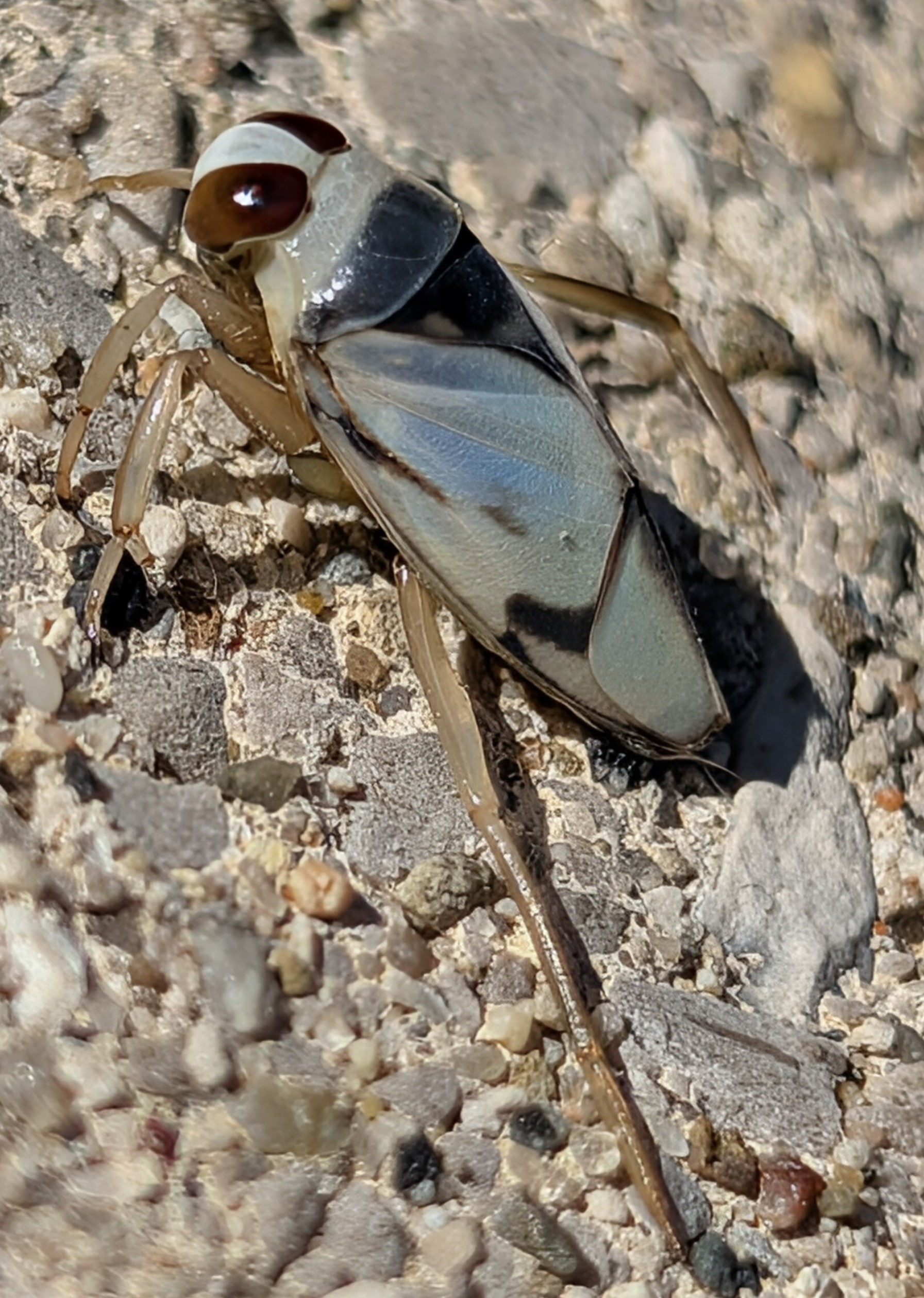
