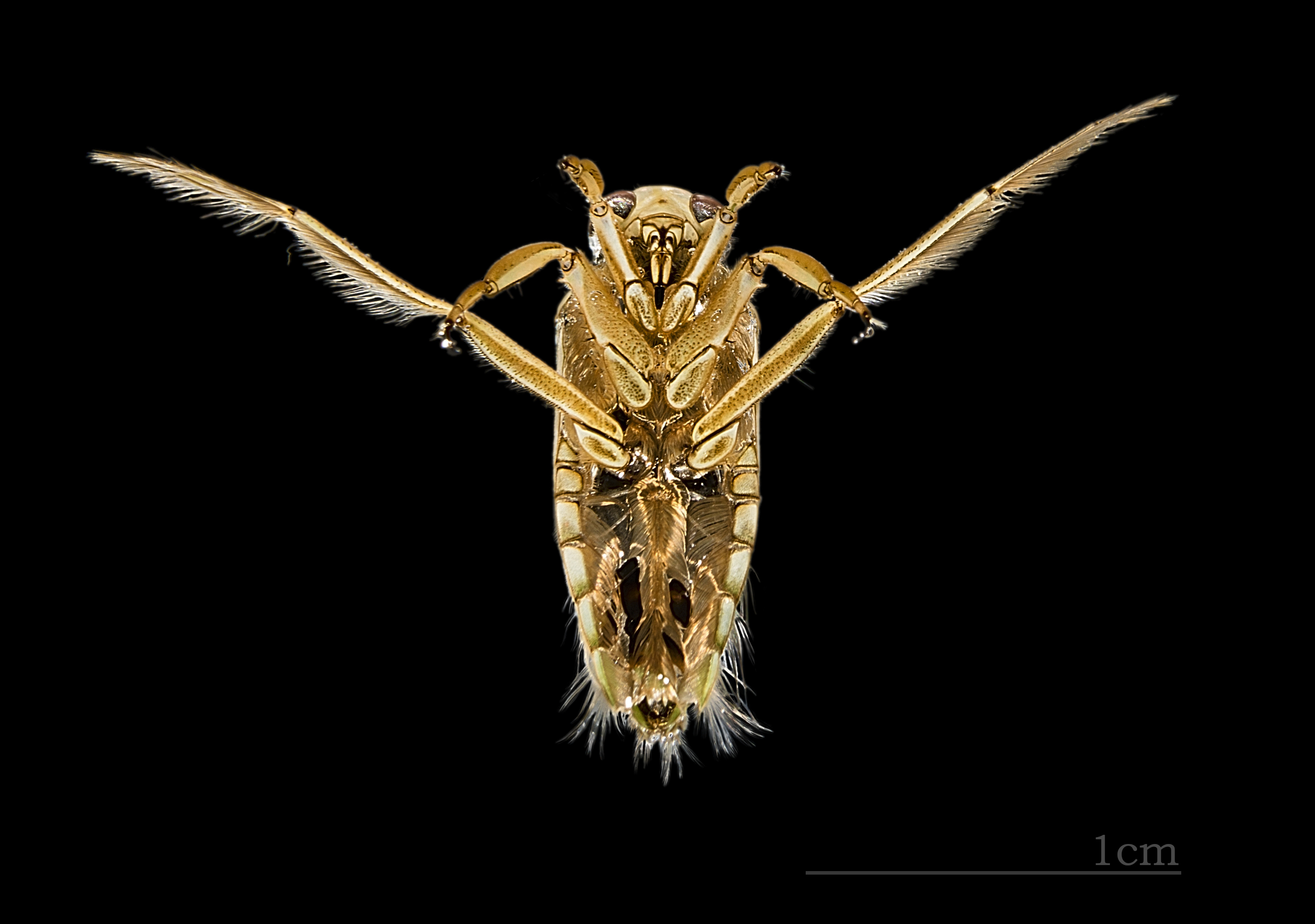
- Notonecta maculata

Scientific classification
- Kingdom: Animalia
- Phylum: Arthropoda
- Clade: Pancrustacea
- Class: Insecta
- Order: Hemiptera
- Suborder: Heteroptera
- Superfamily: Notonectoidea
- Family: Notonectidae
- Genus: Notonecta; Linnaeus, 1758

Subgenera
- Notonecta (Bichromonecta) Hungerford, 1933; Notonecta (Enitharonecta) Hungerford, 1928; Notonecta (Erythronecta) Hungerford, 1933; Notonecta (Notonecta) Linnaeus, 1758; Notonecta (Paranecta) Hutchinson, 1929

= Notonecta =

Notonecta Temporal range: Aptian–Present

Genus of true bugs

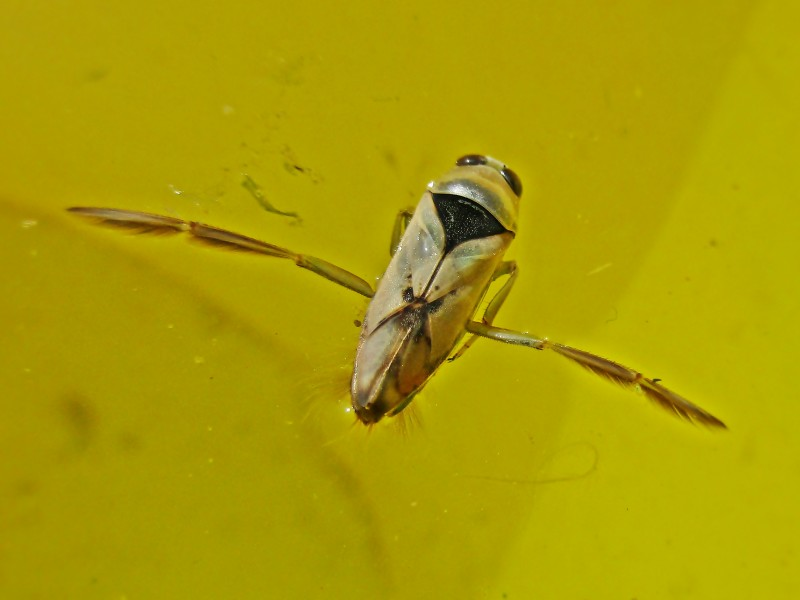
Notonecta viridis

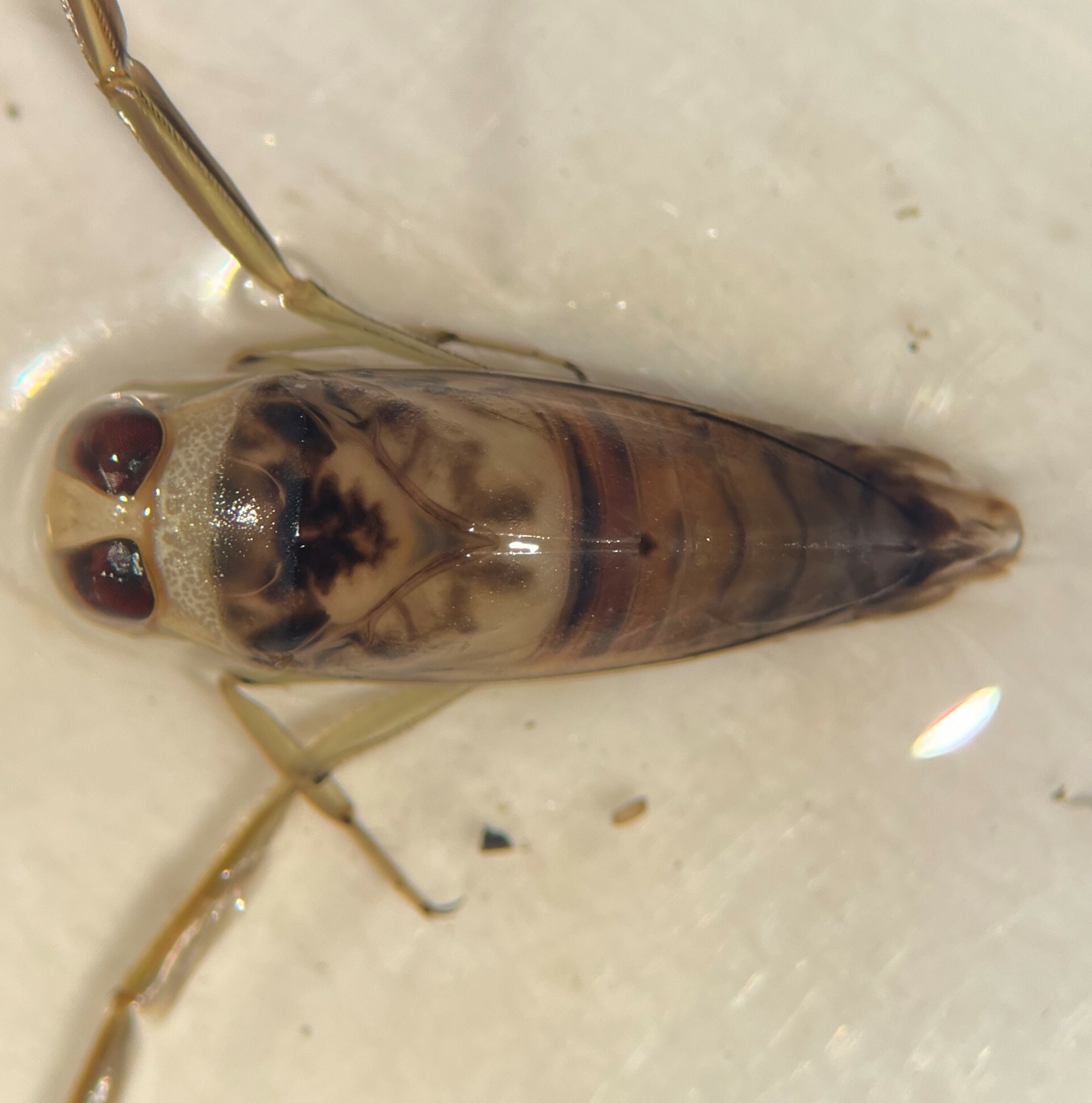
Notonecta indica, Texas

Notonecta (from Ancient Greek νῶτον (nôton), meaning "back", and νηκτός (nēktós), meaning "swimmer"), known as backswimmers or water-boatmen, is a genus of aquatic insects in the bug family Notonectidae.

== Species ==
These 70 species belong to the genus Notonecta:

- Notonecta amplifica Kiritshenko, 1931 (Europe, Asia)
- Notonecta arabiensis Hungerford, 1926 (Palearctic)
- Notonecta bicirca Hungerford, 1926 (South America)
- Notonecta bicircoidea Hungerford, 1928 (South America)
- Notonecta bifasciata Guérin-Méneville, 1844 (South America)
- Notonecta borealis Hussey, 1919 (North America)
- Notonecta canariensis Kirkaldy, 1897 (Africa)
- Notonecta ceres Kirkaldy, 1897 (Central America)
- Notonecta chinensis Fallou, 1887 (Southern Asia)
- Notonecta colombiana Hungerford, 1933 (South America)
- Notonecta compacta Hungerford, 1925 (Central America)
- Notonecta confusa Hungerford, 1930 (South America)
- Notonecta distinctoidea Hungerford, 1930 (Central America)
- Notonecta disturbata Hungerford, 1926 (South America)
- Notonecta fazi Hungerford, 1930 (South America)
- Notonecta glauca Linnaeus, 1758 (Africa, Palearctic)
- Notonecta handlirschi Kirkaldy, 1897 (Australia)
- Notonecta hintoni Hungerford, 1933 (Central America)
- Notonecta hoffmanni Hungerford, 1925 (Central and North America)
- Notonecta huincamoreni Bachmann, 1962 (South America)
- Notonecta hungerfordi J. Polhemus, 1993 (South America)
- Notonecta impressa Fieber, 1851 (Central America)
- Notonecta inca Mazzucconi, 2000 (South America)
- Notonecta indica Linnaeus, 1771 (the Americas, Oceania)
- Notonecta indicoidea Hungerford, 1927 (Central America)
- Notonecta insulata Kirby, 1837 (North America)
- Notonecta irrorata Uhler, 1879 (North America)
- Notonecta itatiaia Barbosa & Nessimian, 2013 (South America)
- Notonecta kiangsis Kirkaldy, 1902 (Europe, Asia)
- Notonecta kirbyi Hungerford, 1925 (North America)
- Notonecta kirkaldyi Martin, 1902 (Southern Asia)
- Notonecta lactitans Kirkaldy, 1897 (Africa)
- Notonecta lobata Hungerford, 1925 (Central and North America)
- Notonecta lunata Hungerford, 1926 (North America)
- Notonecta lutea Müller, 1776 (Palearctic)
- Notonecta maculata Fabricius, 1794 (Africa, Palearctic)
- Notonecta meinertzhageni Poisson, 1933 (Africa)
- Notonecta melaena Kirkaldy, 1897 (Central America)
- Notonecta meridionalis Poisson, 1926 (Africa, Palearctic)
- Notonecta mexicana Amyot & Serville, 1843 (the Americas)
- Notonecta montandoni Kirkaldy, 1897 (Southern Asia)
- Notonecta montezuma Kirkaldy, 1897 (Central and North America)
- Notonecta nigra Fieber, 1852 (South America)
- Notonecta obliqua Gallen, 1787 (Palearctic)
- Notonecta ochrothoe Kirkaldy, 1897 (South America)
- Notonecta pallidula Poisson, 1926 (Africa)
- Notonecta penecompacta Hungerford, 1938 (Central America)
- Notonecta penelobata Hungerford, 1938 (Central America)
- Notonecta peruviana Hungerford, 1933 (South America)
- Notonecta petrunkevitchi Hutchinson, 1945 (North America)
- Notonecta polystolisma Fieber, 1851 (South America)
- Notonecta pulchra Hungerford, 1926 (South America)
- Notonecta raleighi Torre-Bueno, 1907 (North America)
- Notonecta repanda Hungerford, 1933 (Central and North America)
- Notonecta reuteri Hungerford, 1928 (Europe and Asia)
- Notonecta robusta Hungerford, 1932 (Central America)
- Notonecta saramao Esaki, 1932 (Southern Asia)
- Notonecta sellata Fieber, 1851 (South America)
- Notonecta shooteri Uhler, 1894 (Central America and North America)
- Notonecta spinosa Hungerford, 1930 (North America)
- Notonecta thomasi Hungerford, 1937 (Central America)
- Notonecta triguttata Motschulsky, 1861 (Europe and Asia)
- Notonecta uhleri Kirkaldy, 1897 (North America)
- Notonecta undulata Say, 1832 (North America)
- Notonecta unifasciata Guérin-Méneville, 1857 (the Americas)
- Notonecta variabilis Fieber, 1852 (North America, South America)
- Notonecta vereertbruggheni Hungerford, 1928 (South America)
- Notonecta violacea Kirkaldy, 1897 (Southern Asia)
- Notonecta virescens Blanchard, 1852 (South America)
- Notonecta viridis Delcourt, 1909 (Africa, Europe, Asia)
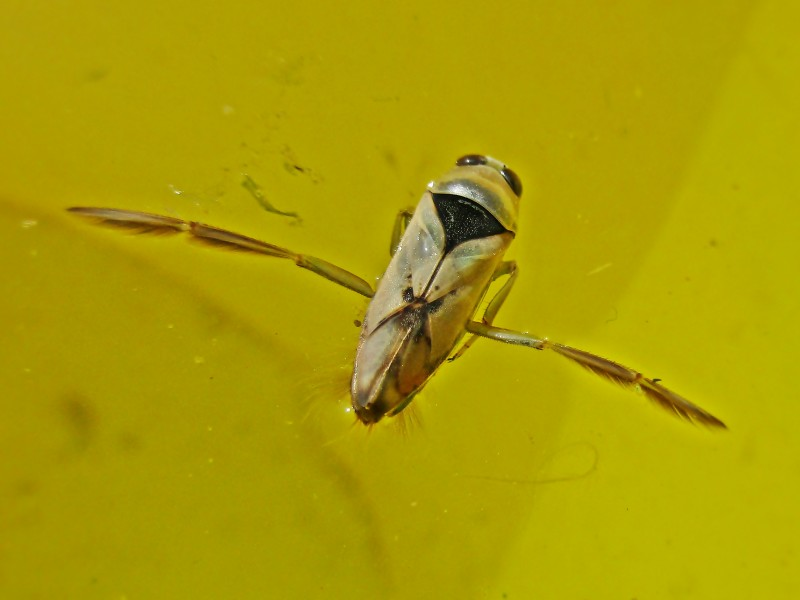
Notonecta viridis, Netherlands

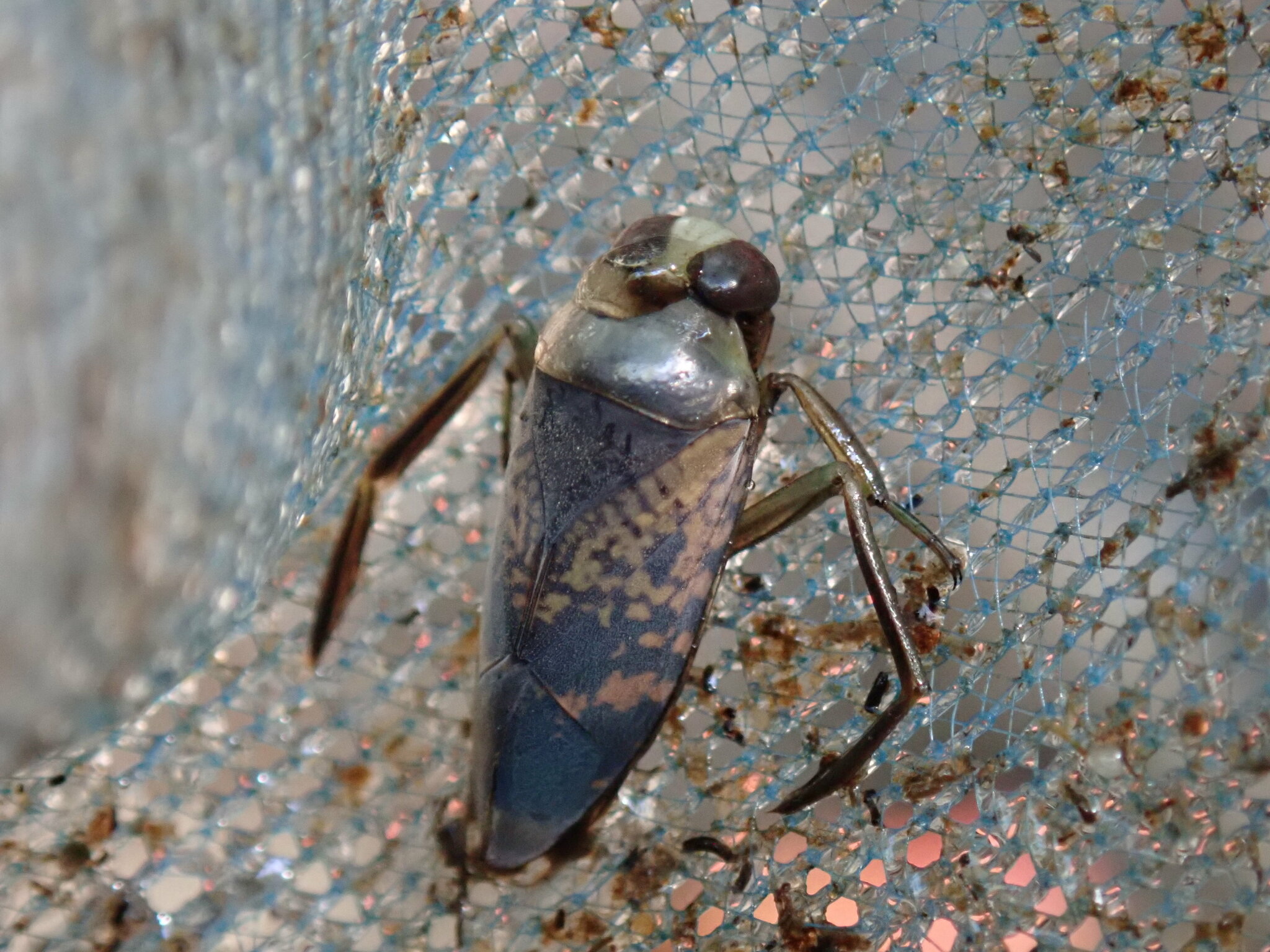
Notonecta irrorata, Texas

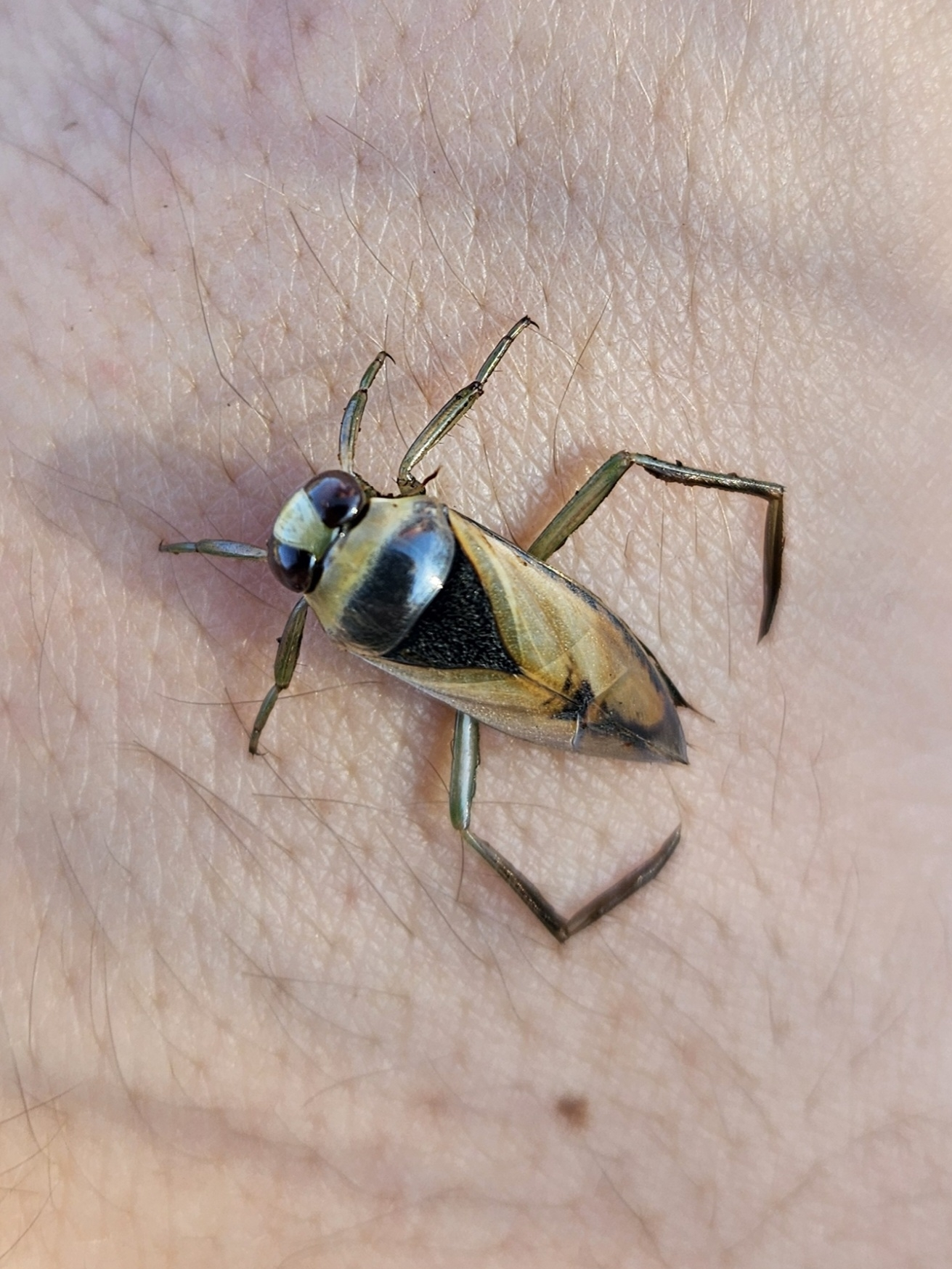
Notonecta glauca, Czechia

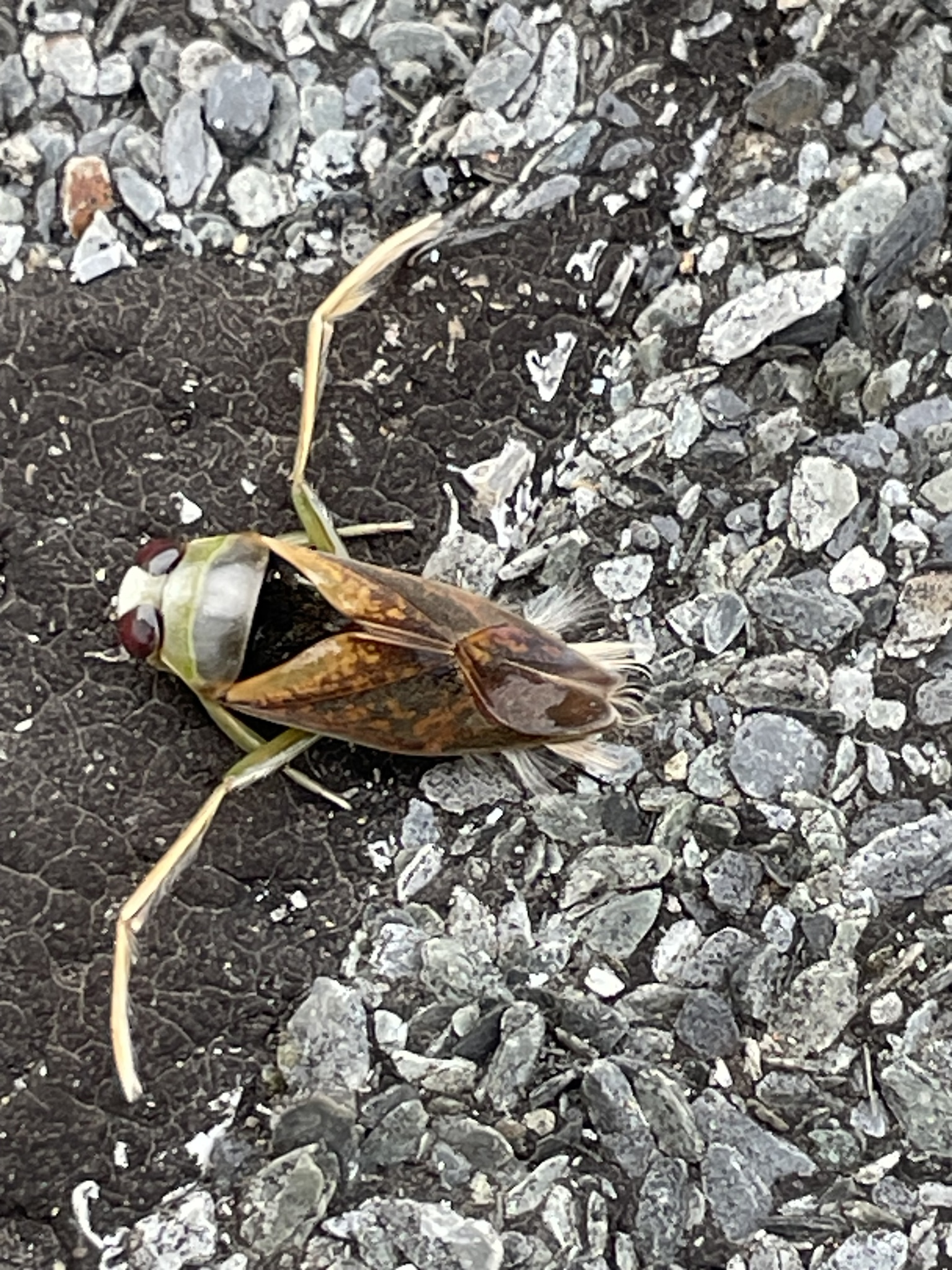
Notonecta maculata, Germany

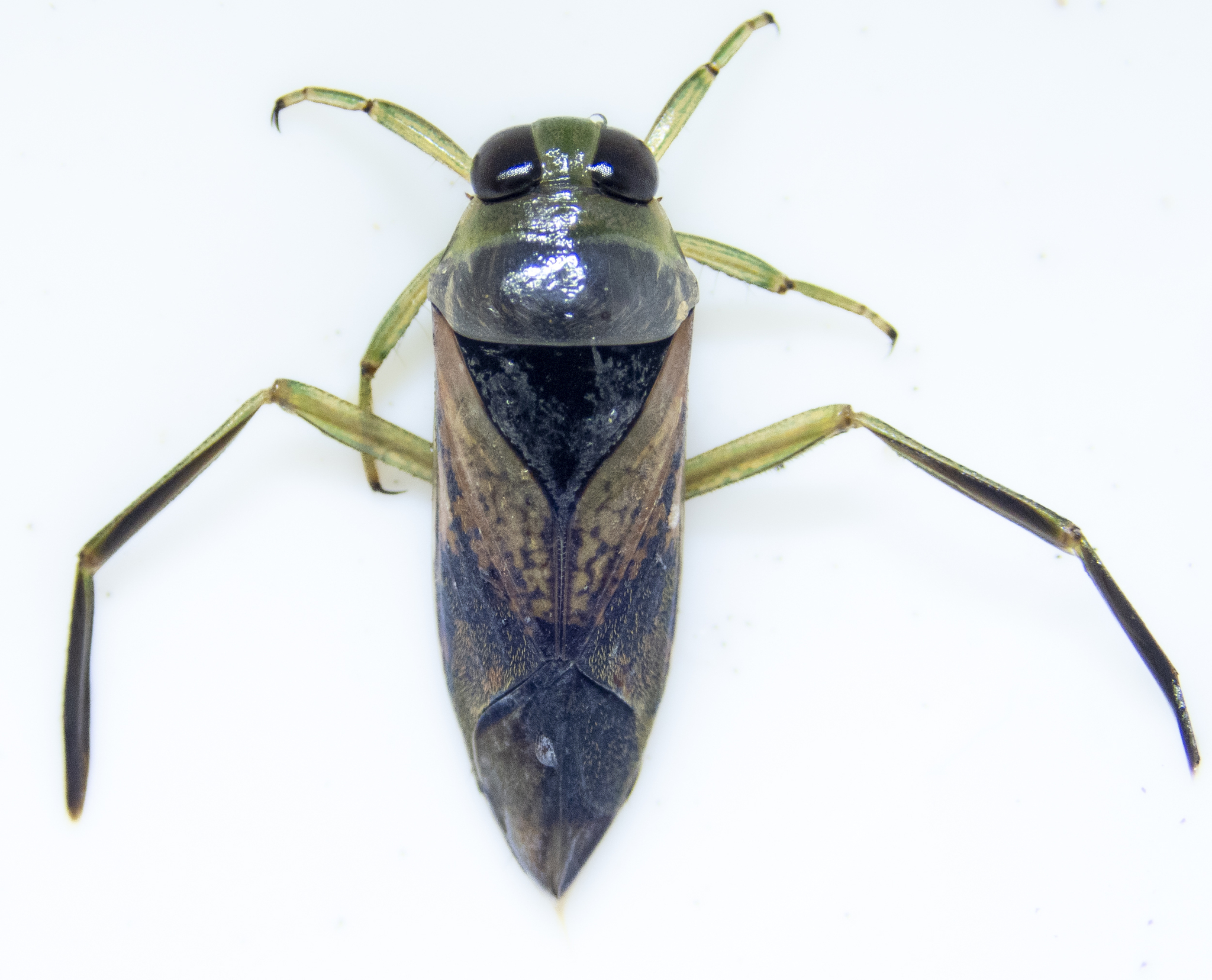
Notonecta kirbyi, California

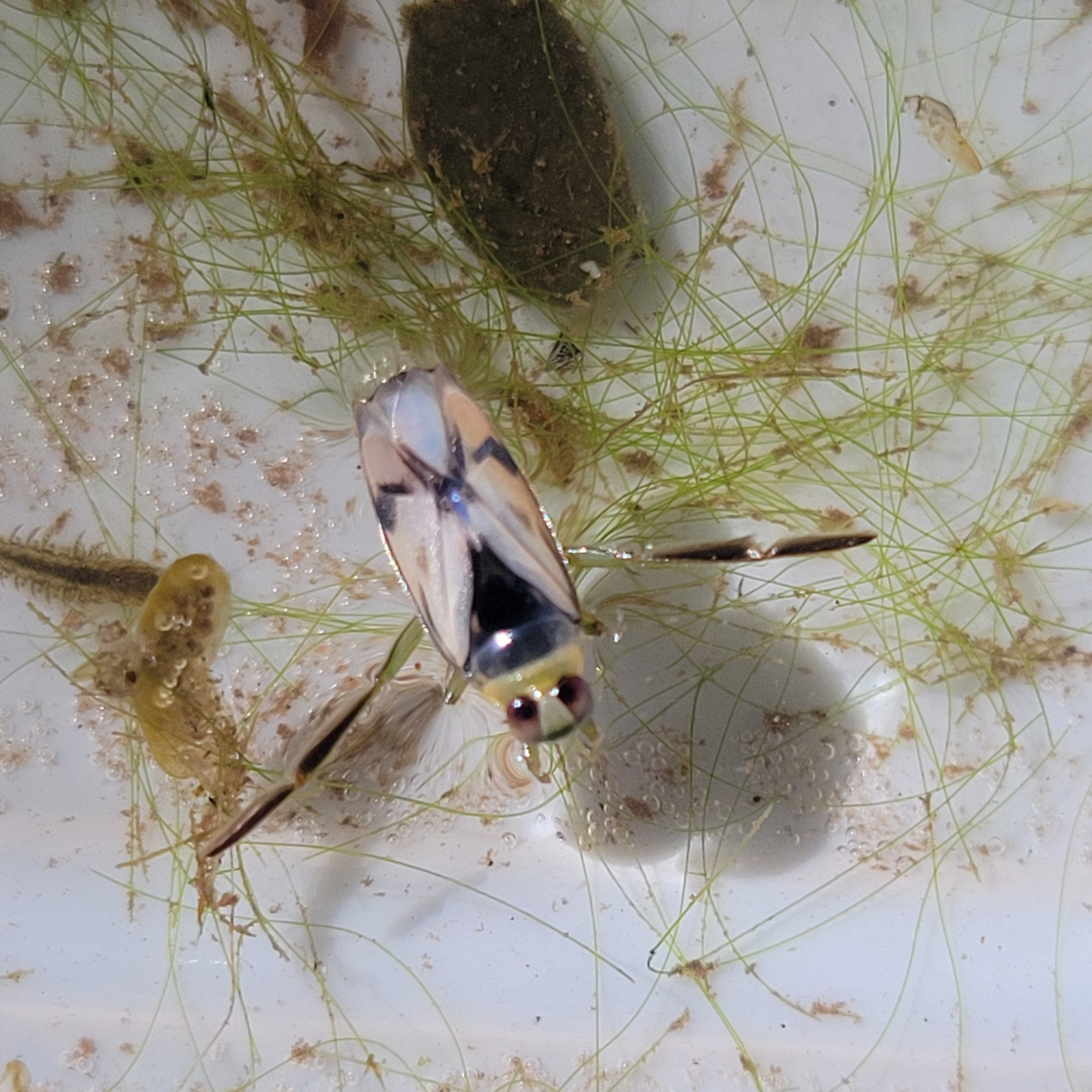
Notonecta undulata, Canada

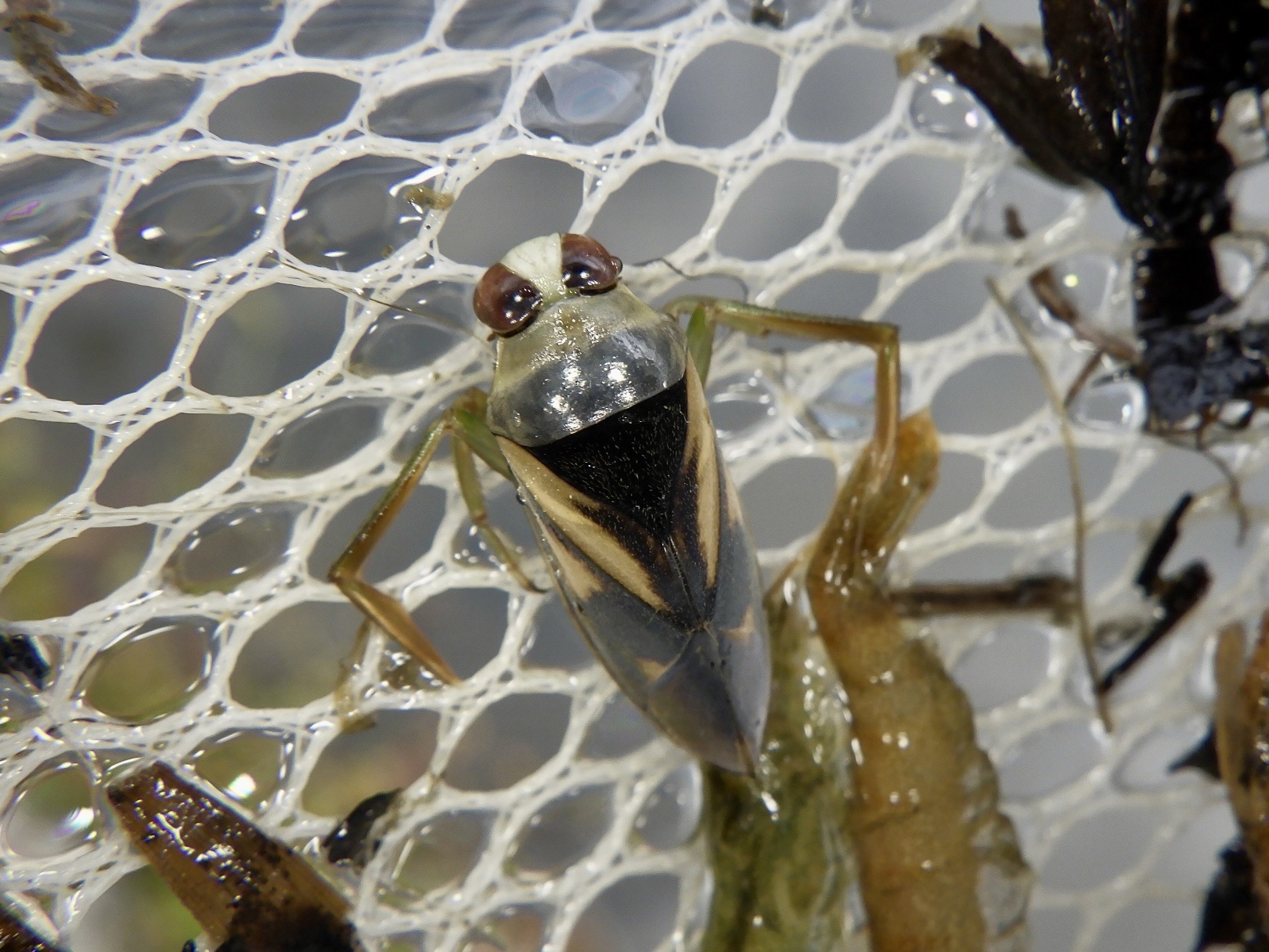
Notonecta triguttata, Japan

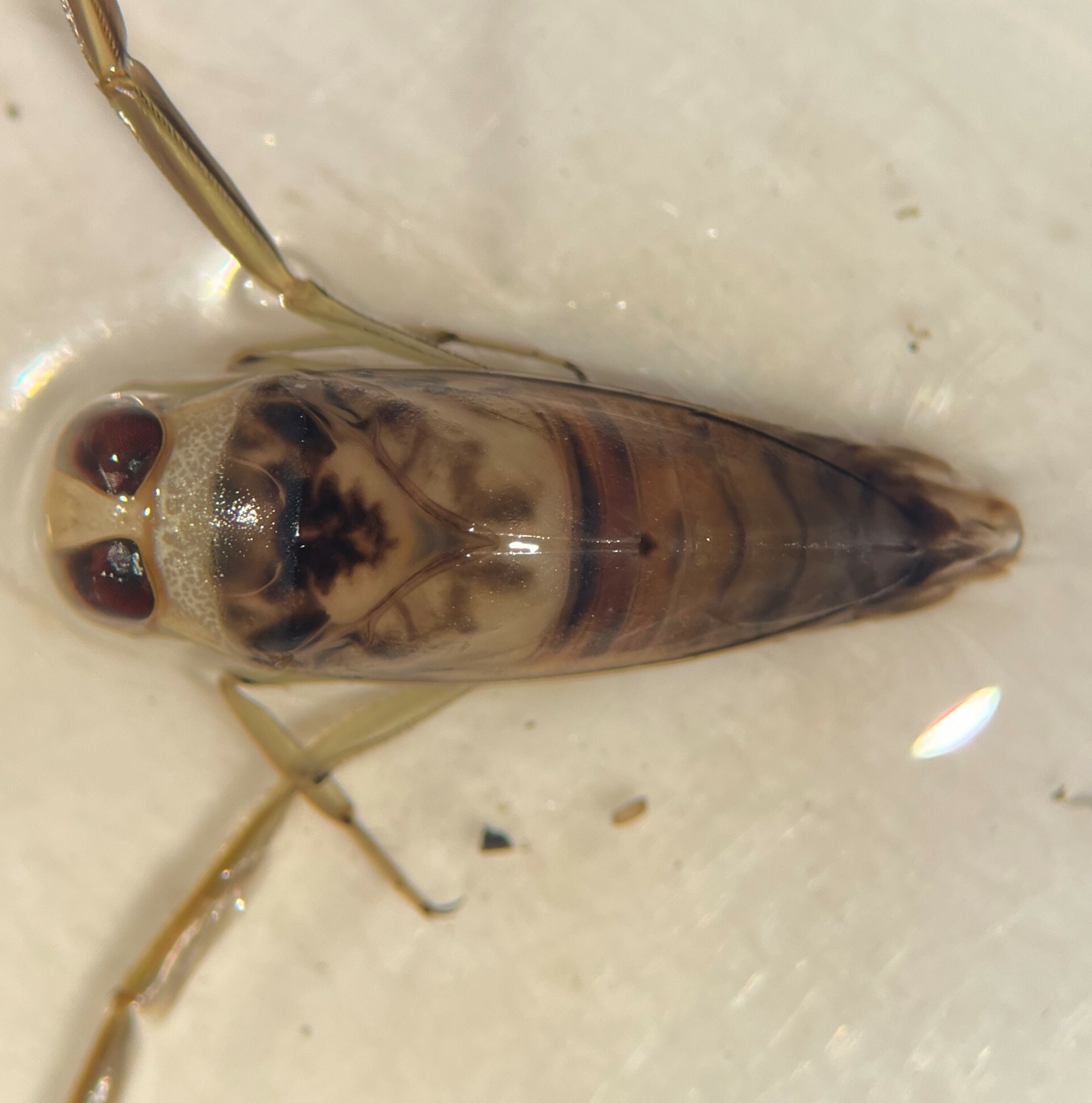
Notonecta indica, Texas

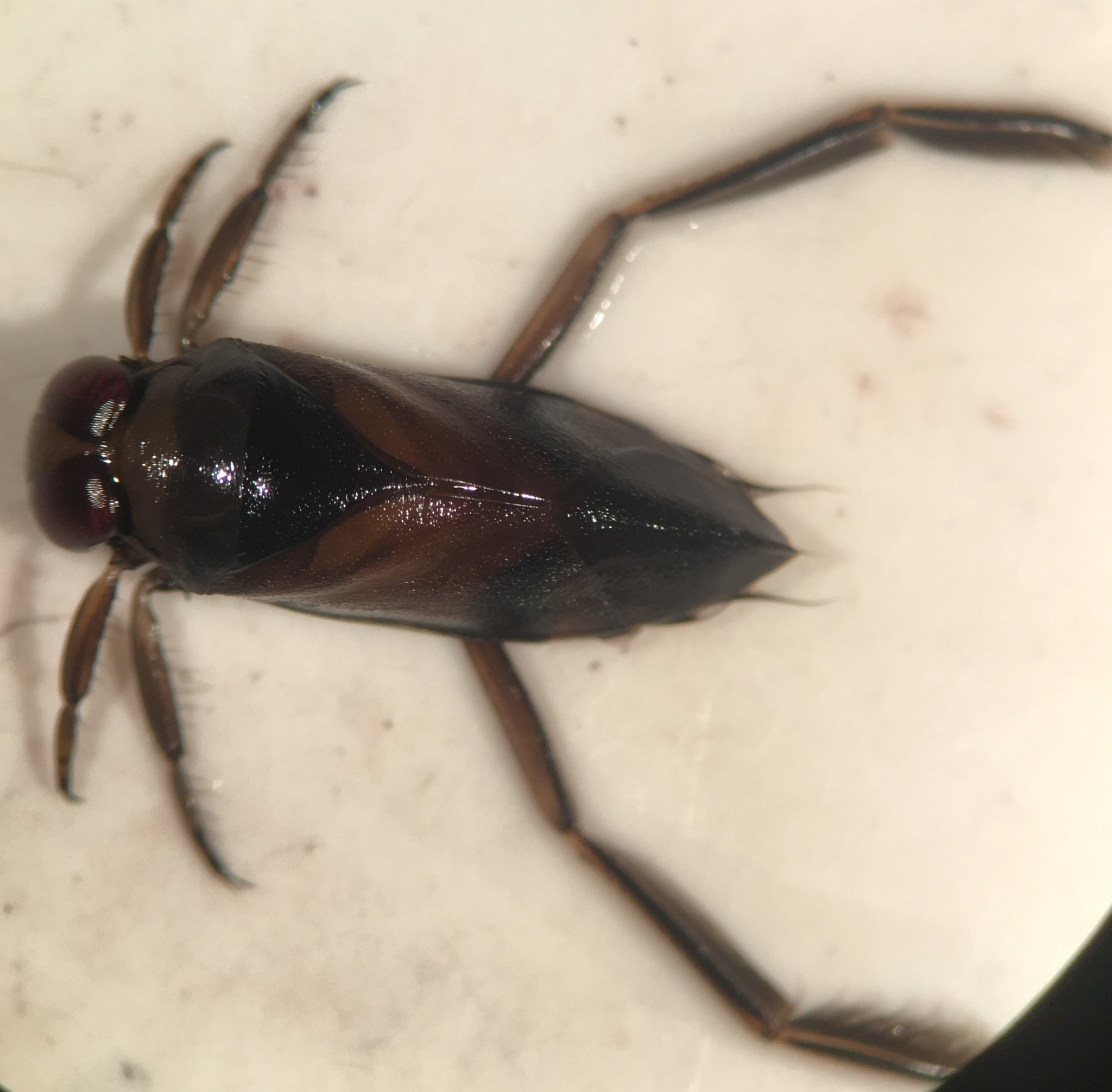
Notonecta uhleri, North Carolina

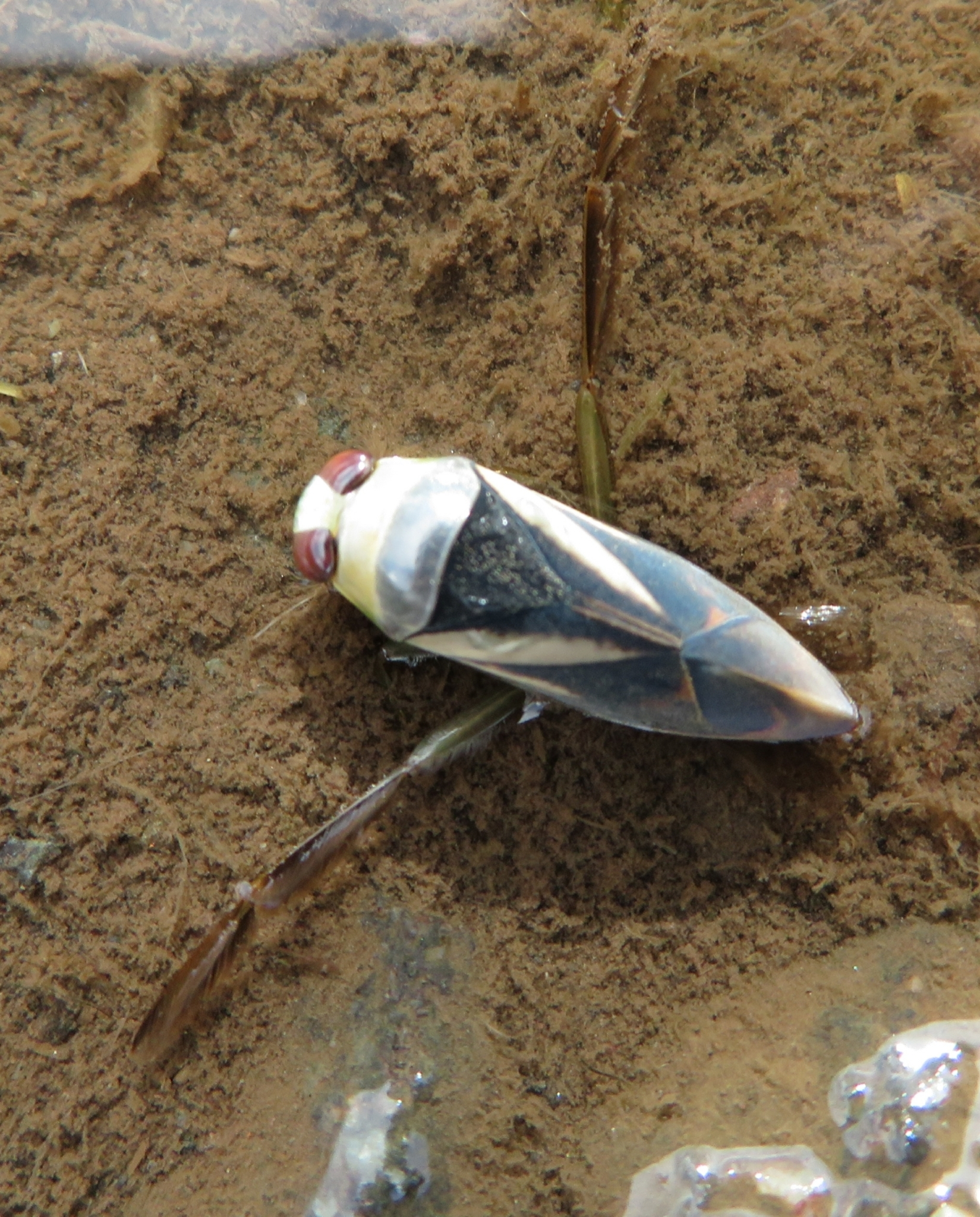
Notonecta obliqua, UK

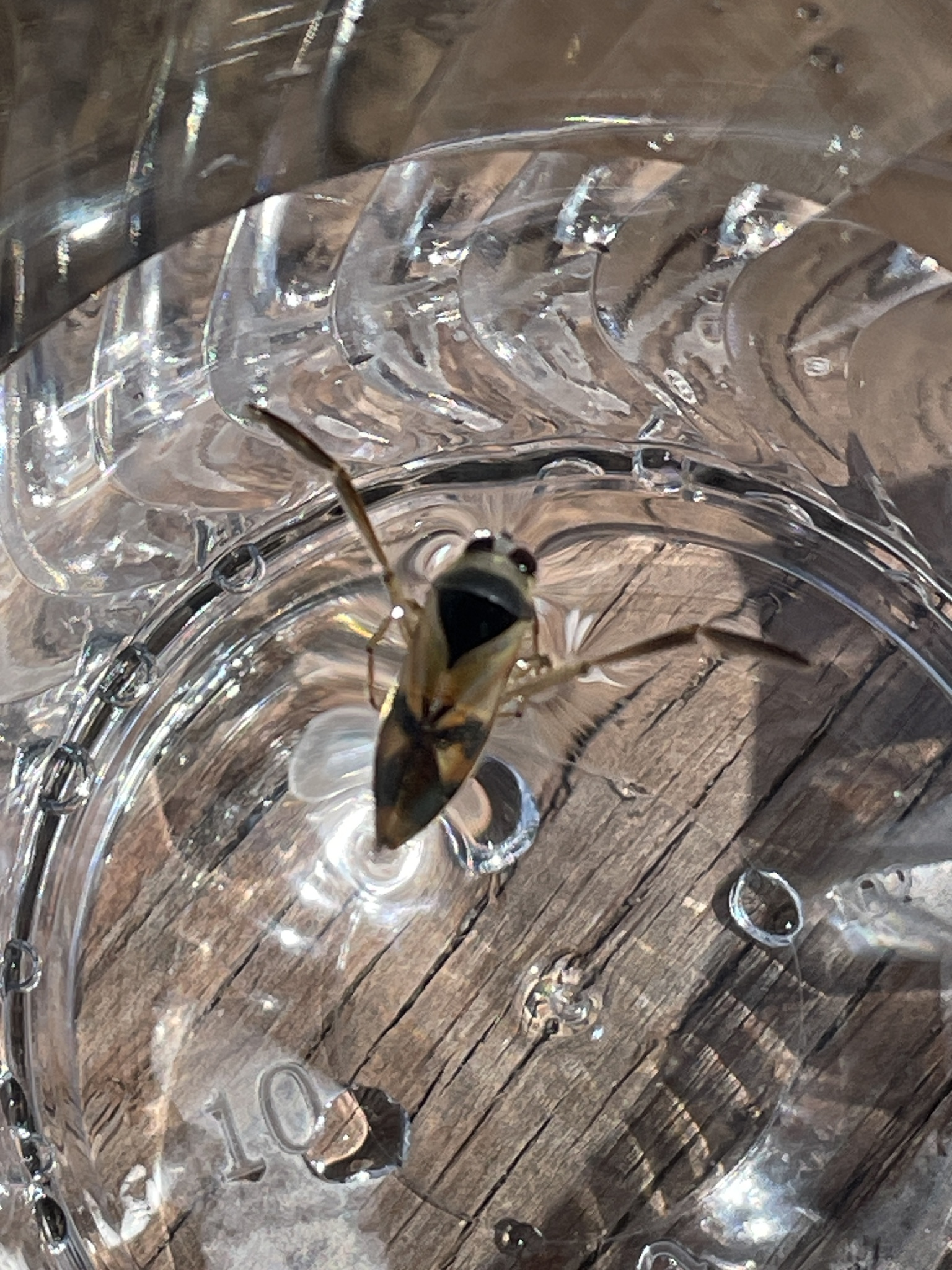
Notonecta insulata, Pennsylvania

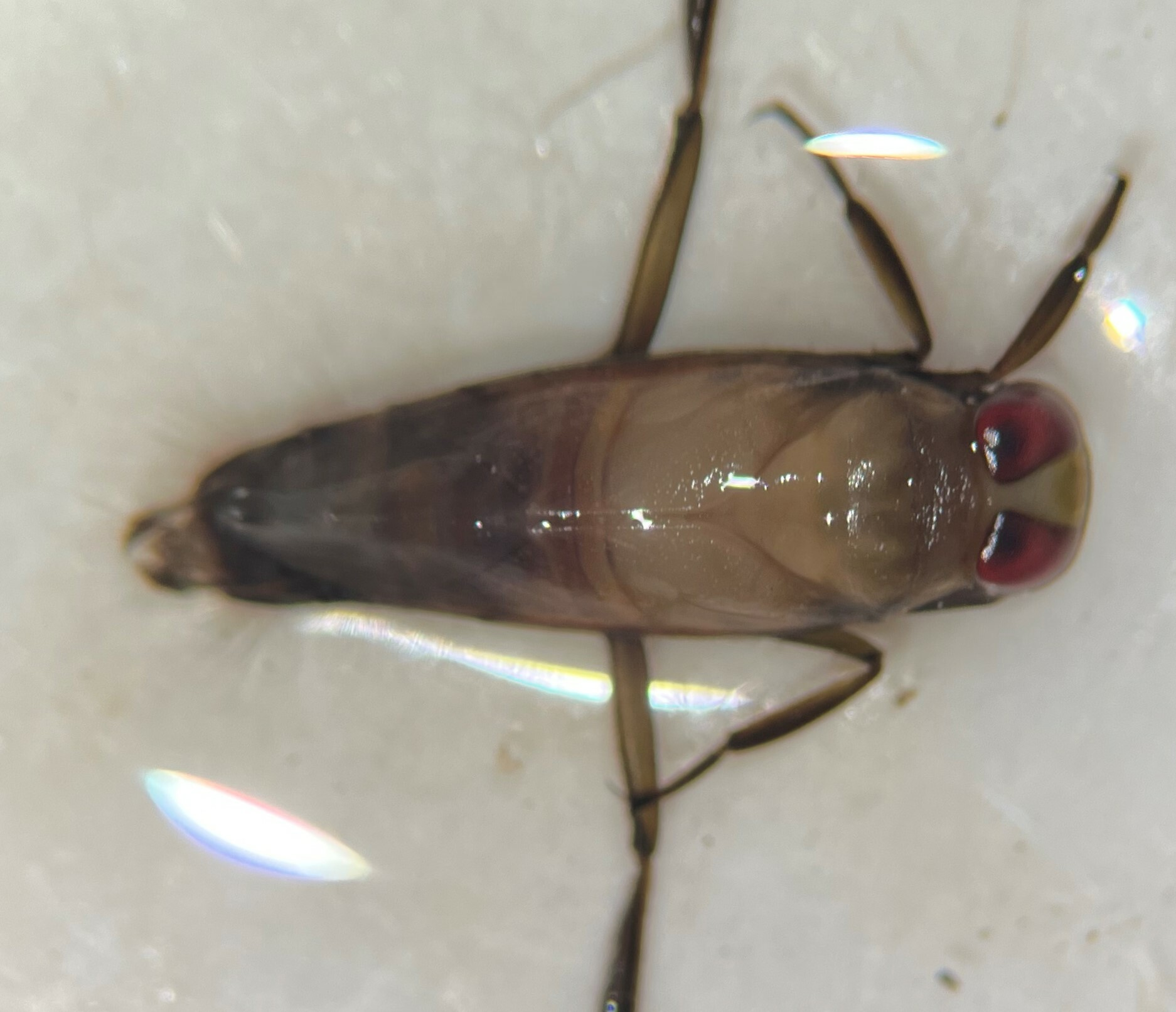
Notonecta petrunkevitchi, North Carolina

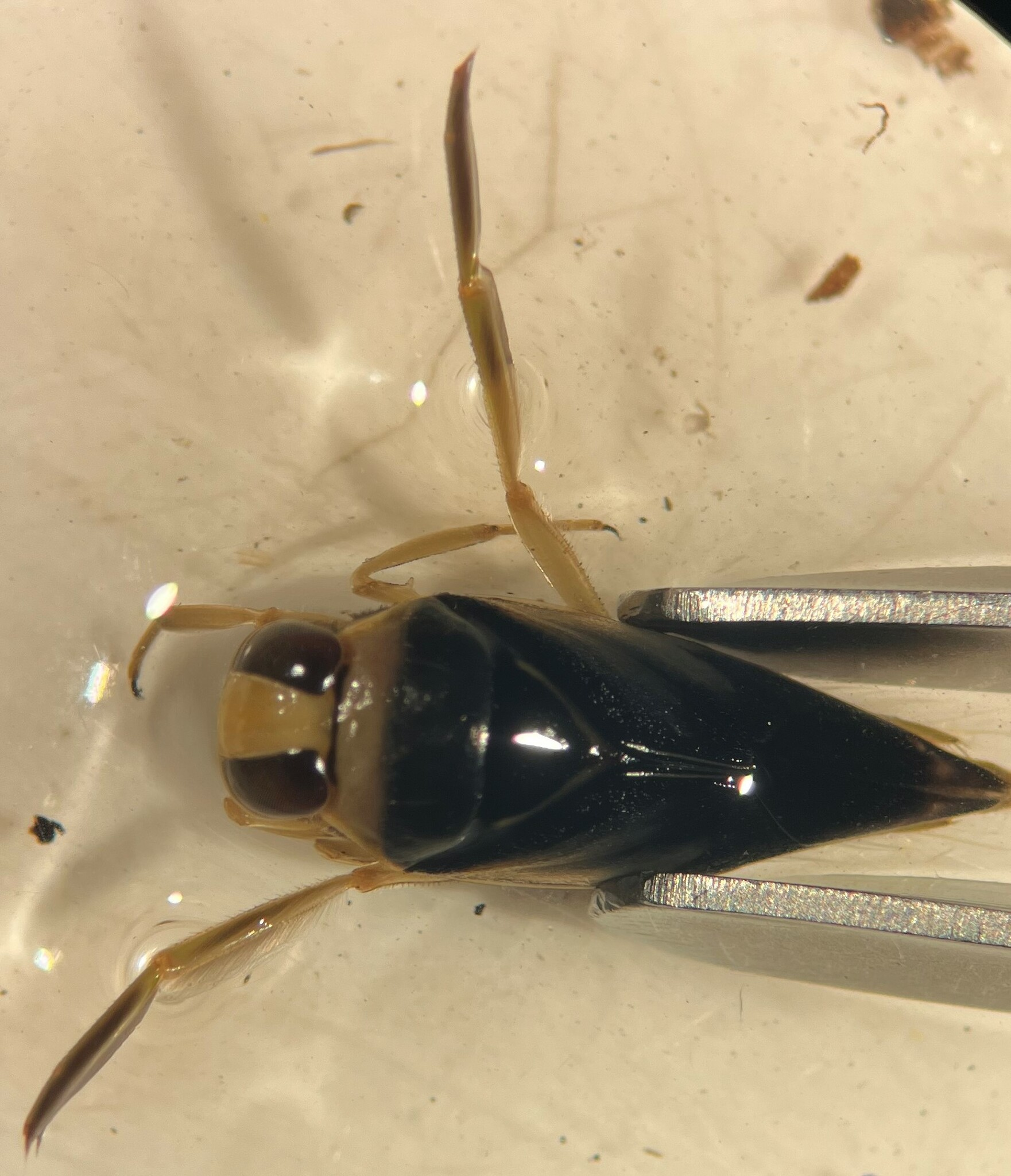
Notonecta unifasciata, Texas

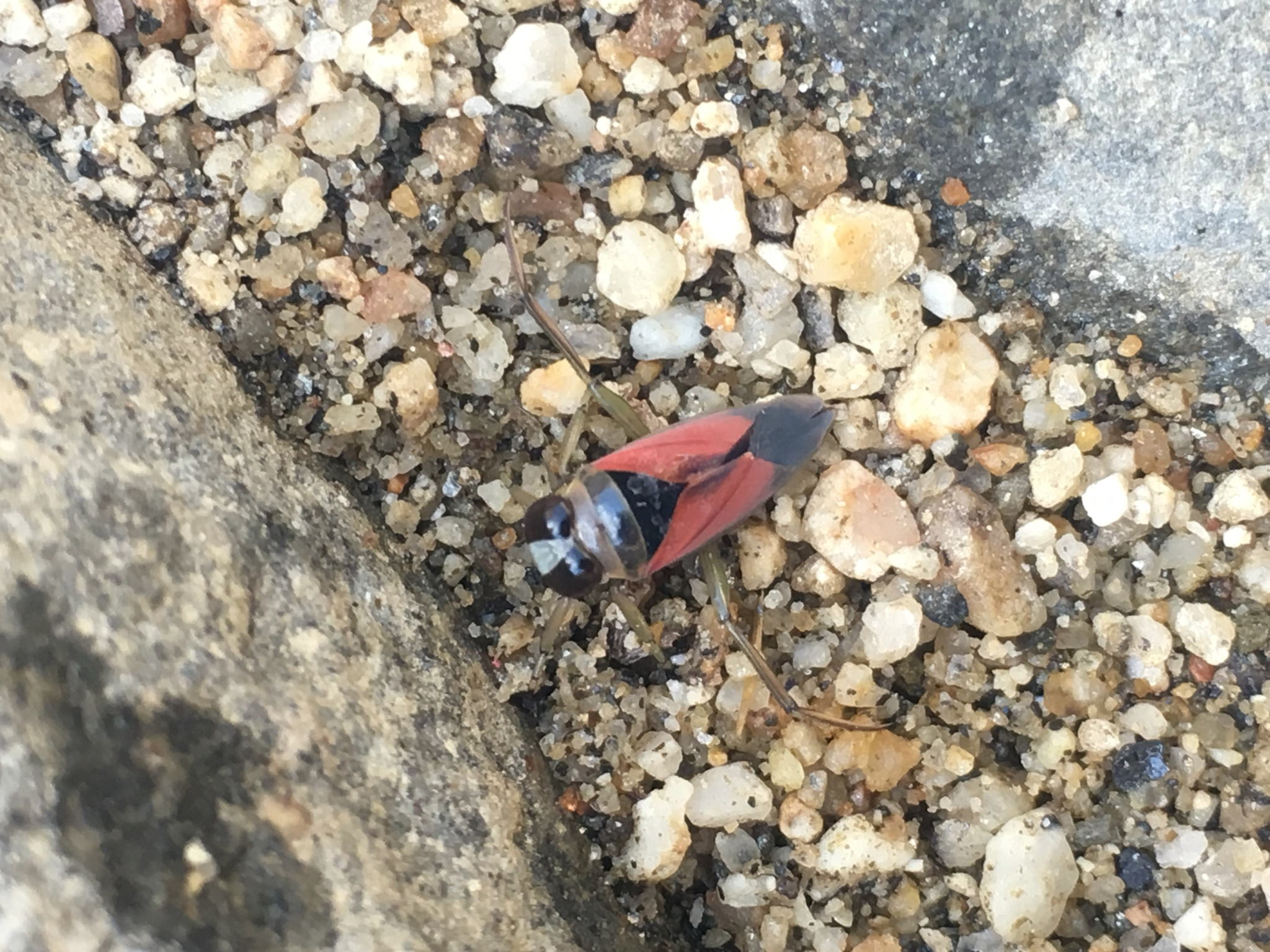
Notonecta lobata, México

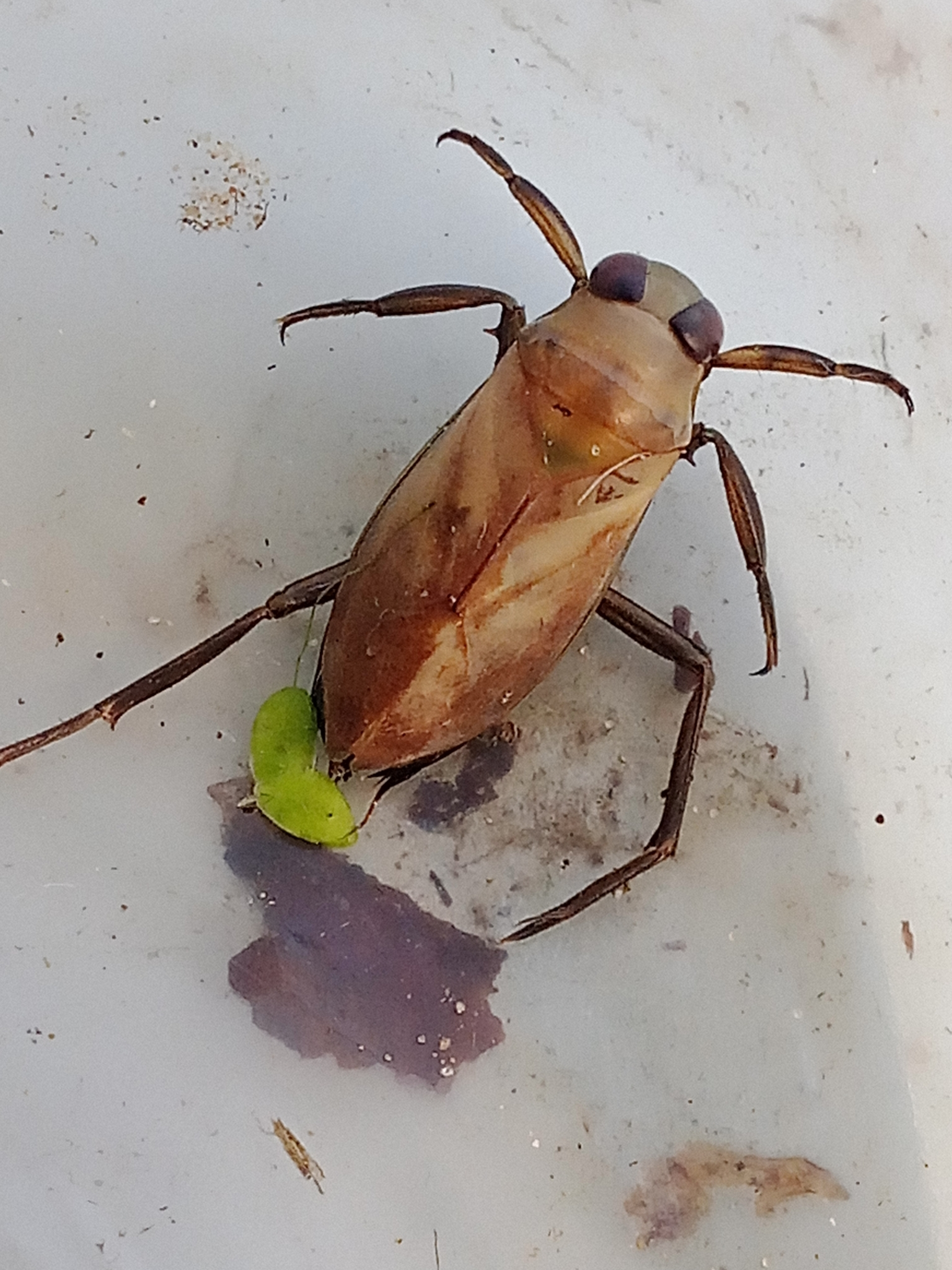
Notonecta reuteri, Russia

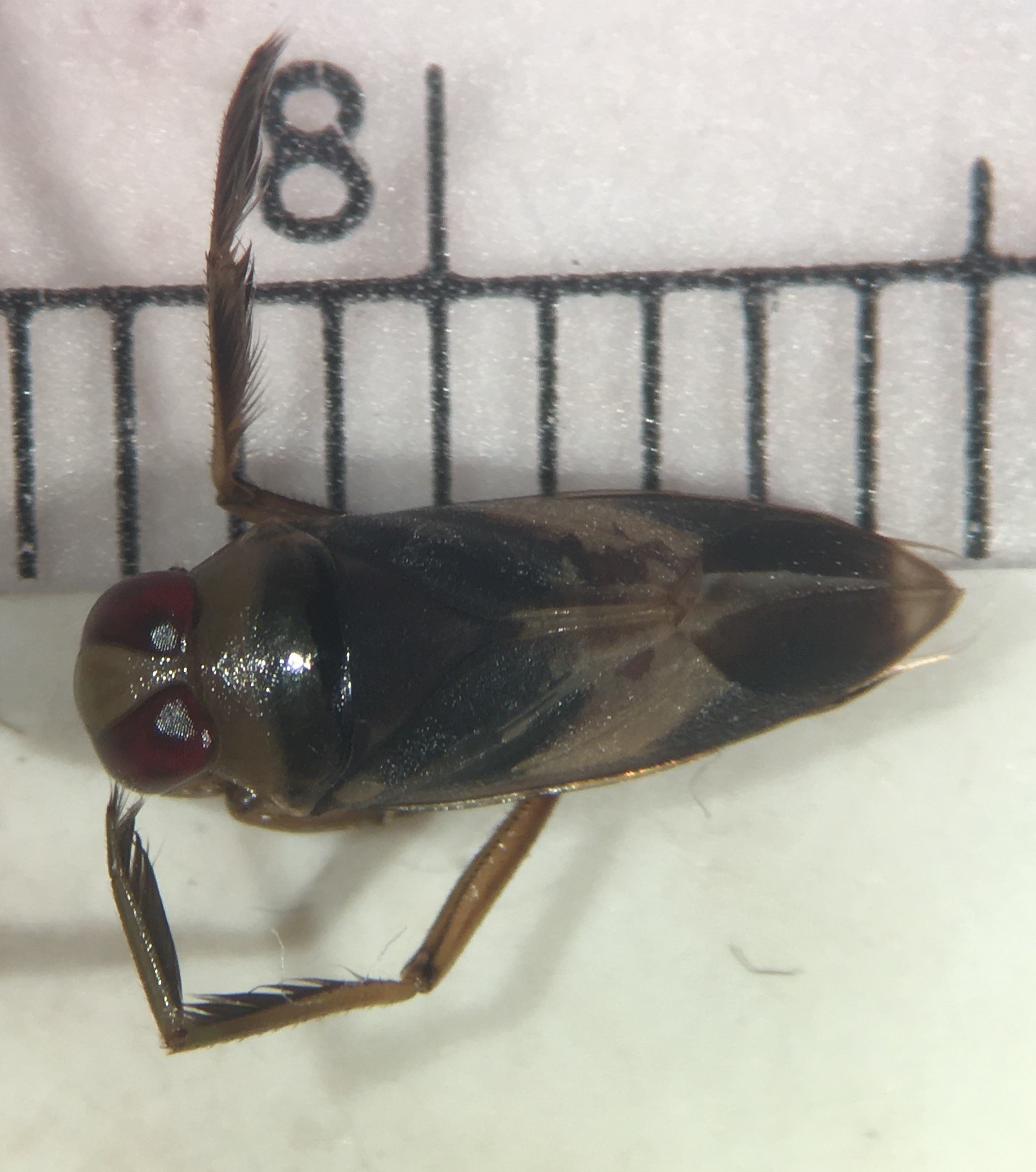
Notonecta raleighi, Mississippi

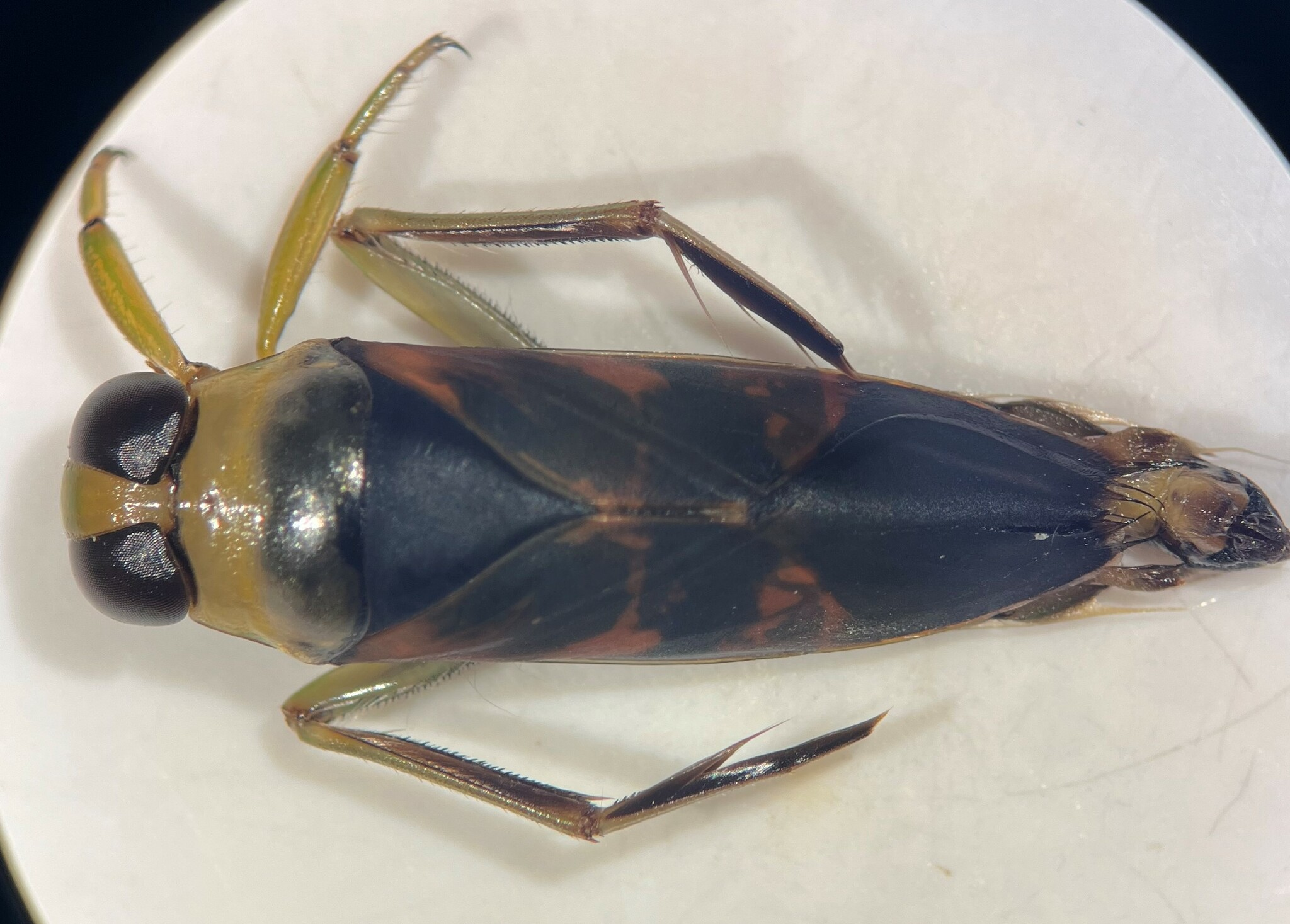
Notonecta montezuma, Texas

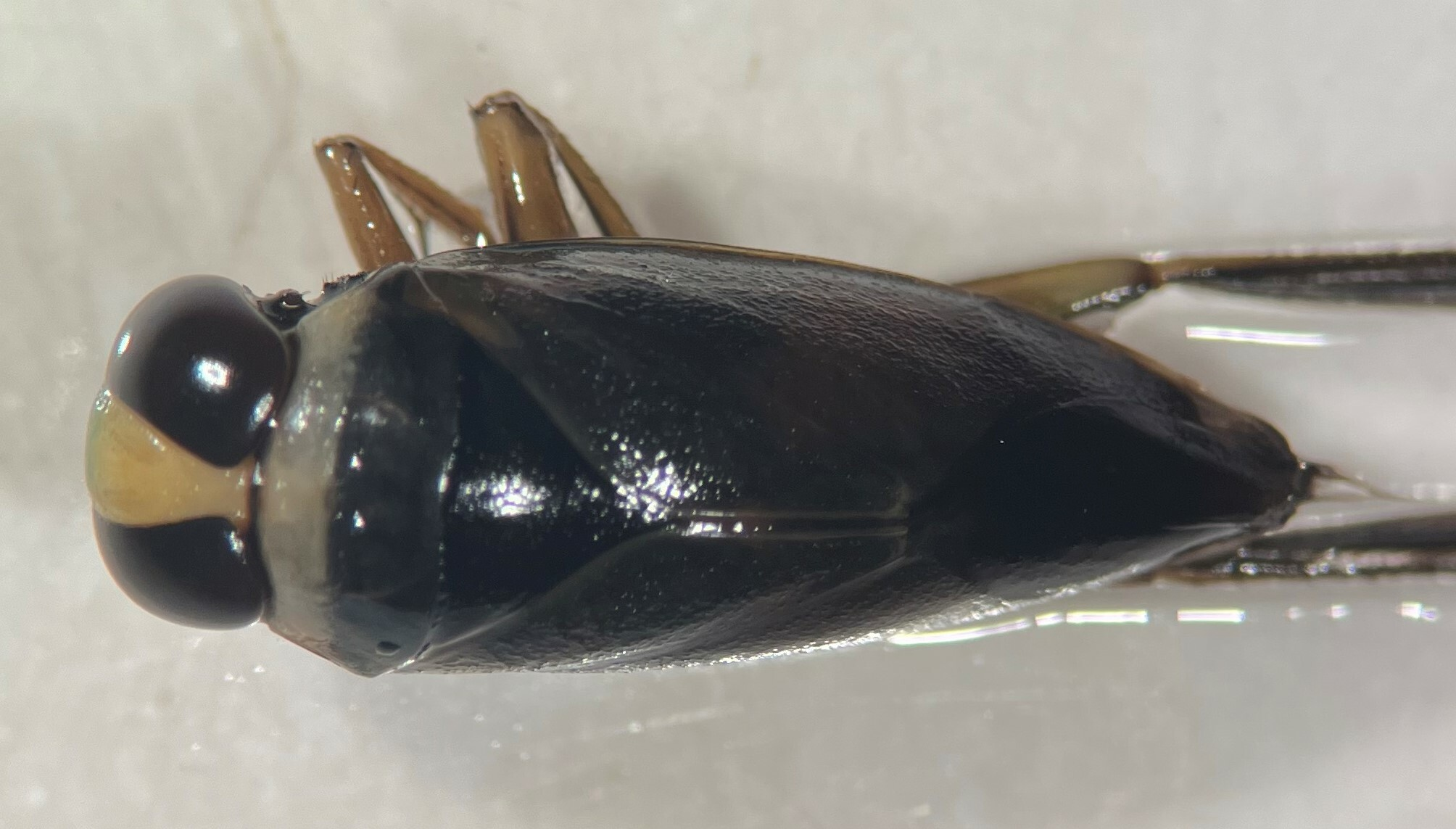
Notonecta hoffmani, California

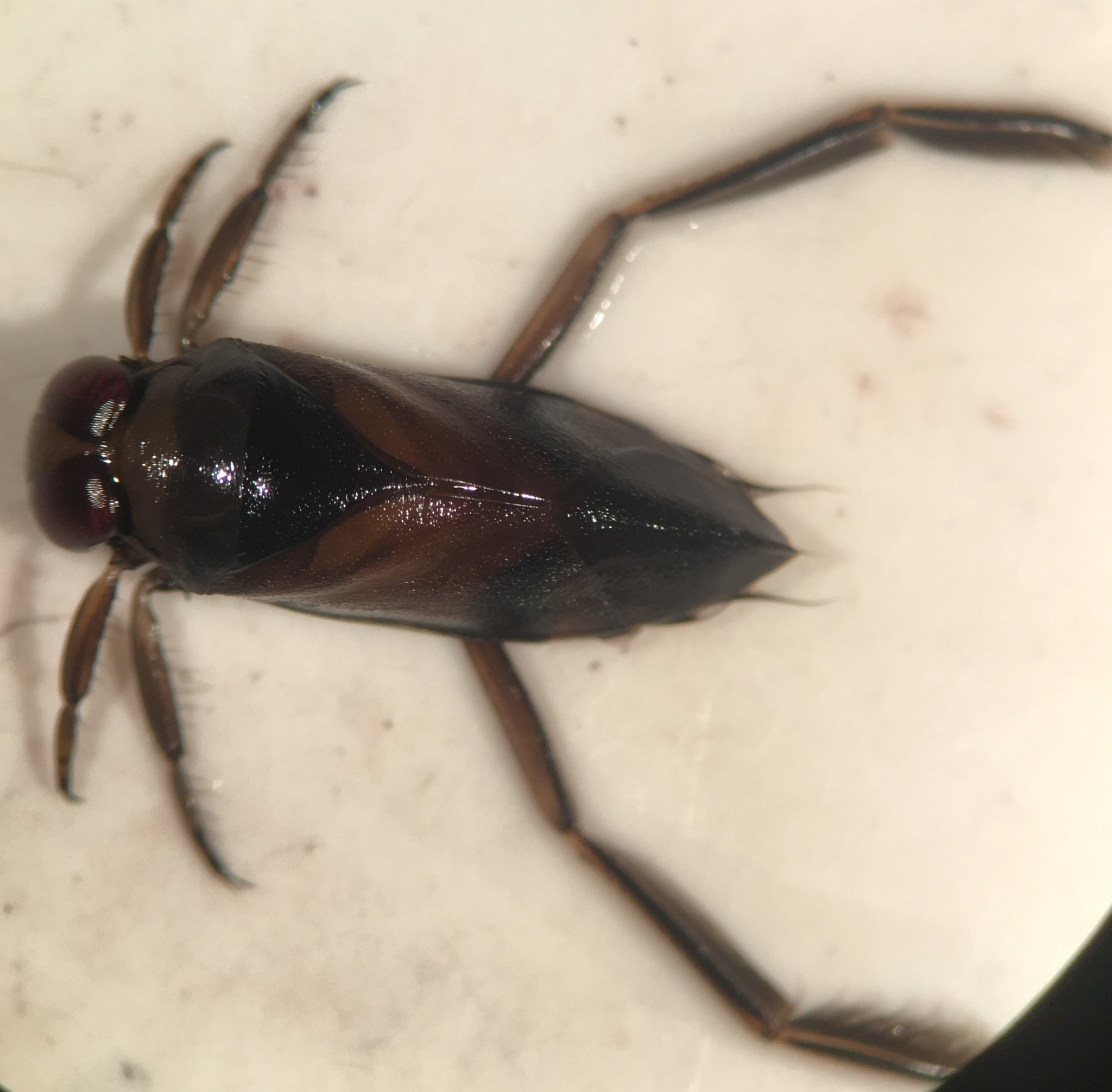
Notonecta uhleri, North Carolina
