= Martarega =

Scientific classification
- Domain: Eukaryota
- Kingdom: Animalia
- Phylum: Arthropoda
- Class: Insecta
- Order: Hemiptera
- Suborder: Heteroptera
- Family: Notonectidae
- Genus: Martarega; White, 1879

Genus of true bugs

Martarega is a genus of backswimmers in the family Notonectidae. There are about 13 described species in Martarega.

== Species ==
These 13 species belong to the genus Martarega:

- Martarega awa
- Martarega bentoi Truxal, 1949
- Martarega brasiliensis Truxal, 1949
- Martarega chinai Hynes, 1948
- Martarega gonostyla Truxal, 1949
- Martarega guajira
- Martarega lofoides
- Martarega membranacea White, 1879
- Martarega mexicana Truxal, 1949
- Martarega nessimiani Barbosa & Rodrigues
- Martarega nieseri Barbosa, Ribeiro & Nessimian, 2012
- Martarega oriximinaensis Barbosa, Ribeiro & Ferreira Keppler, 2010
- Martarega siolii Barbosa, Nessimian & Takiya
