= Nychia =

Scientific classification
- Kingdom: Animalia
- Phylum: Arthropoda
- Clade: Pancrustacea
- Class: Insecta
- Order: Hemiptera
- Suborder: Heteroptera
- Family: Notonectidae
- Genus: Nychia; Stål, 1858

Genus of insects

Nychia is a genus of true bugs belonging to the family Notonectidae.

The species of this genus are found in Southern Africa and Australia.

Species:

- Nychia infuscata Paiva, 1918
- Nychia limpida Stål, 1859
- Nychia malayana Lundblad, 1933
- Nychia marshalli (Scott, 1872)
- Nychia sappho Kirkaldy, 1901
