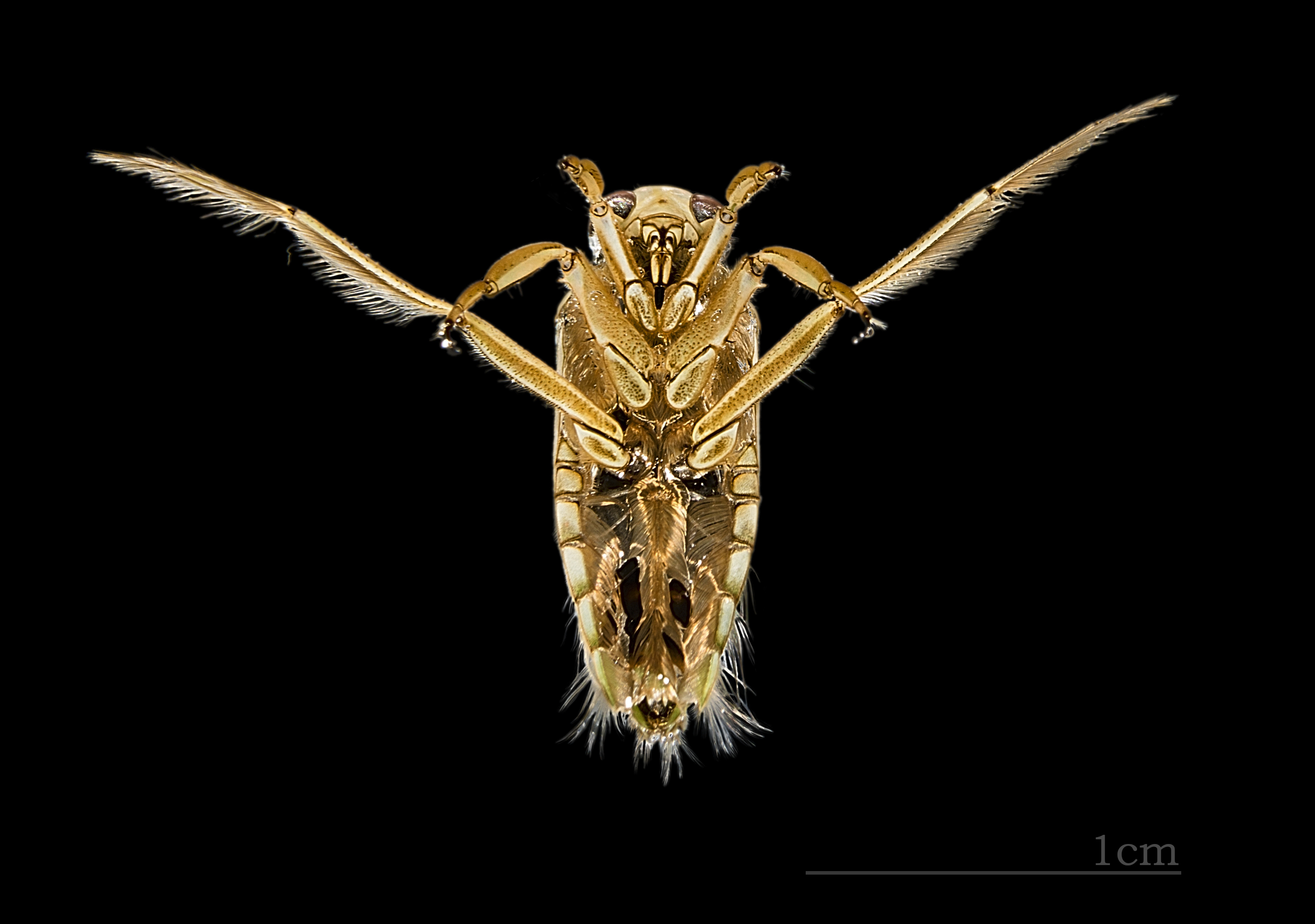
- Notonecta maculata Ventral side
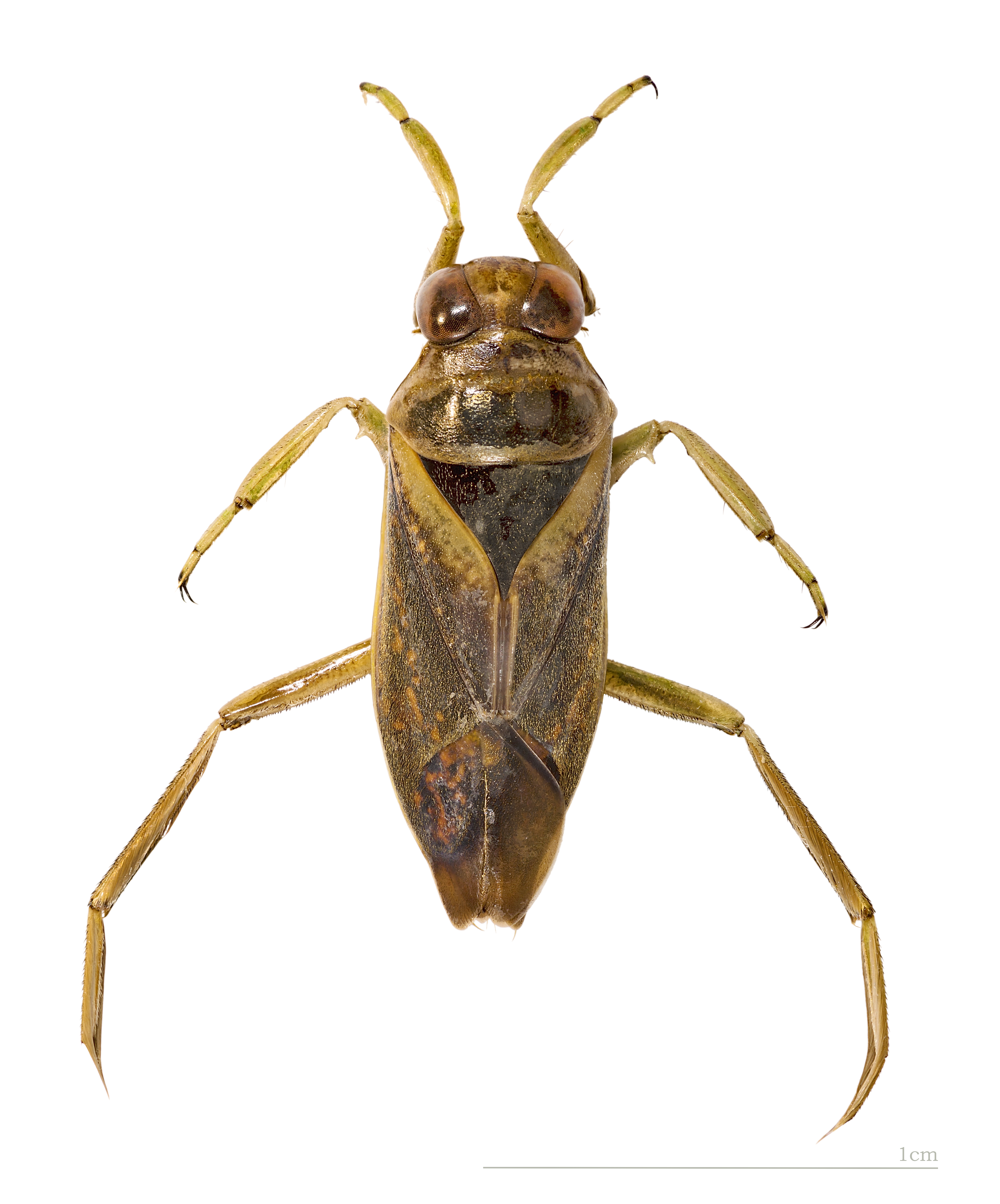
- Notonecta maculata Dorsal side

Scientific classification
- Domain: Eukaryota
- Kingdom: Animalia
- Phylum: Arthropoda
- Class: Insecta
- Order: Hemiptera
- Suborder: Heteroptera
- Family: Notonectidae
- Genus: Notonecta
- Species: N. maculata

Binomial name
- Notonecta maculata Fabricius, 1794

= Notonecta maculata =

Species of true bug

Notonecta maculata is a backswimmer of the family Notonectidae, found in Europe, including the United Kingdom.

== Morphology ==
Notonecta maculata are small, light brown insects of the order Hemiptera. These animals have a number of dark markings on their wings and body, and have large reddish eyes. Their hind legs are modified to be oar-shaped, to allow them to swim in water.

These animals can grow up to 2 centimeters in length in their adult stage.

This individual species can be distinguished from other Notonecta species by their mottled brick-coloured forewings.

== Diet ==
Notonecta maculata are voracious predators, eating many invertebrate species found in their habitats. In their juvenile stages, they primarily eat Daphnia magna and zooplankton, and in adult stages they will also include mosquito eggs to their diet, although they will also eat most things that they can find.

In their juvenile stages, they select prey based on size - when presented with multiple sizes of Daphnia, Notonecta maculata will go after larger Daphnia. The adult stages will also select for larger Daphnia and zooplankton.

The amount of light present affects the predation rate of juvenile Notonecta maculata, although this is not based on the time of day. In the dark, they will detect Daphnia at shorter distances, so they will go after the largest Daphnia in their shorter range.

== Habitat ==
Notonecta maculata generally live in small freshwater ponds within the United Kingdom, but can also be found in storm water retention ponds, lakes, swamps, and rivers, as long as the water they are in is freshwater. Although they can live in a single pond for all of their life, they will use their wings to fly away to a different pond in the presence of vertebrate predators.

The Notonecta genus select habitats which enable them to exploit specific foraging strategies. These habitats factor in the presence and density of vegetation, water opacity, nature of the substrate, and prey abundance and diversity. Notonecta maculata instars tend to survive better in an environment where these elements are in a relatively simple state, and will not survive as well when these factors in the environment are more complex, although their survival rate in a complex environment increases as it goes through instar stages.

N. irrorata release two kairomones, n-tricosane and n-heneicosane, that repel the oviposition of Culiseta longiareolata mosquitoes in ponds that N. irrorata inhabits.
