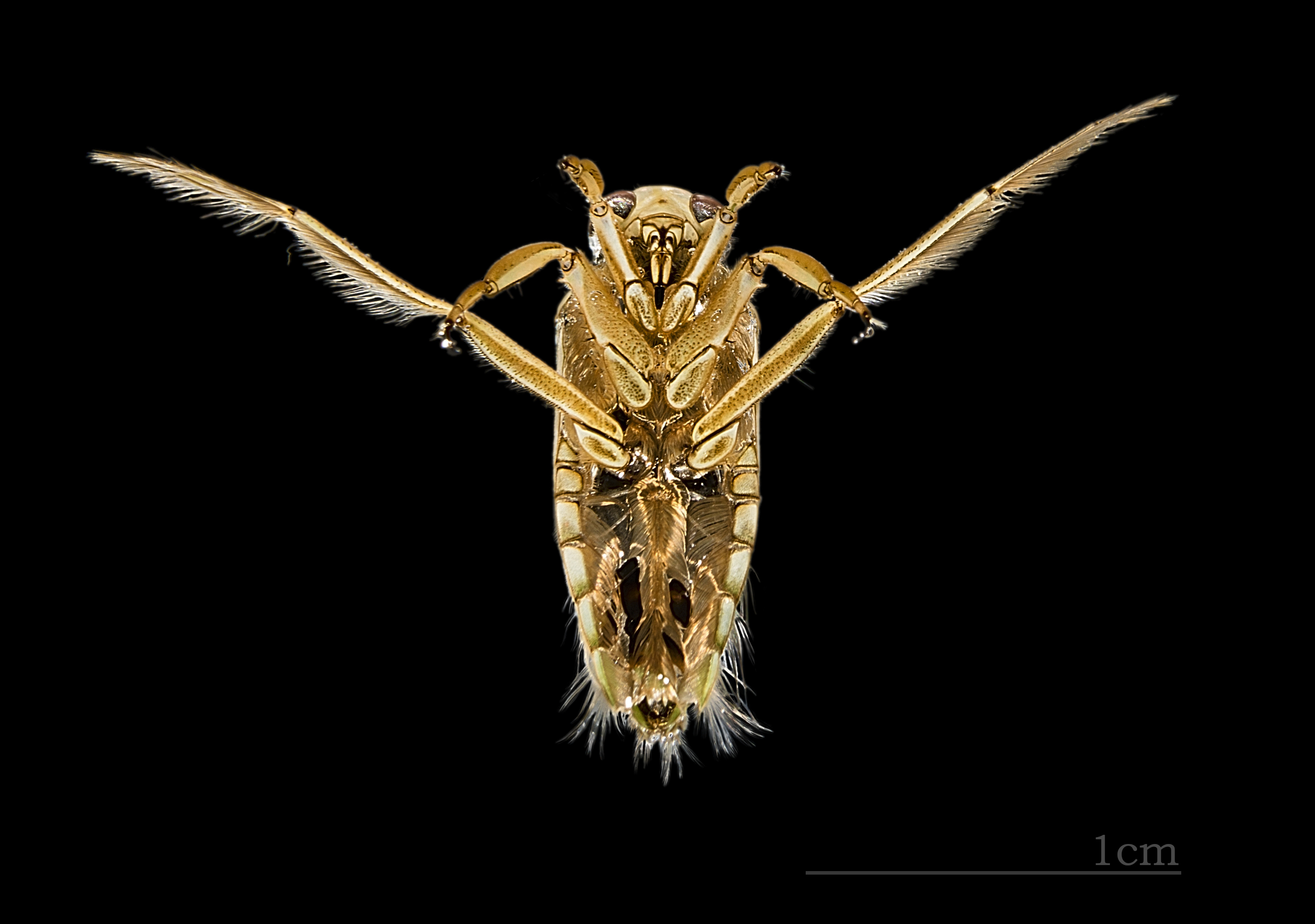
- Notonecta maculata

Scientific classification
- Kingdom: Animalia
- Phylum: Arthropoda
- Clade: Pancrustacea
- Class: Insecta
- Order: Hemiptera
- Suborder: Heteroptera
- Infraorder: Nepomorpha
- Clade: Tripartita
- Superfamily: Notonectoidea
- Family: Notonectidae; Leach, 1815

Subfamilies and genera
- 2 subfamilies: Anisopinae; Anisops; Buenoa; Paranisops; Walambianisops; Notonectinae; Enithares; Notonecta; Martarega; Nychia

= Notonectidae =

Notonectidae Temporal range: Toarcian–Present

Family of true bugs

Notonectidae is a cosmopolitan family of aquatic insects in the order Hemiptera, commonly called backswimmers because they swim supine (ventral side up) in a kind of "backstroke". They are all predators and typically range from 0.5 to 1.5 cm (0.2–0.6 in) in length. They are similar in appearance to Corixidae (water boatmen), but can be separated by differences in their dorsal-ventral coloration, front legs, and predatory behavior. Their dorsum is convex, lightly colored without cross striations. Their front tarsi are not scoop-shaped and their hind legs are fringed for swimming. There are about 350 species in two subfamilies: Notonectinae with seven genera, and Anisopinae with four genera. Members in the former subfamily are often larger than those in the latter.

Backswimmers swim on their backs, vigorously paddling with their long, hair-fringed hind legs and attack prey as large as tadpoles and small fish. They can inflict a painful "bite" on a human being, actually a stab with their sharp tubular mouthparts (proboscis). They inhabit still freshwater, e.g. lakes, ponds, marshes, and are sometimes found in garden ponds and even swimming pools. Although primarily aquatic, they can fly well and so can disperse easily to new habitats.

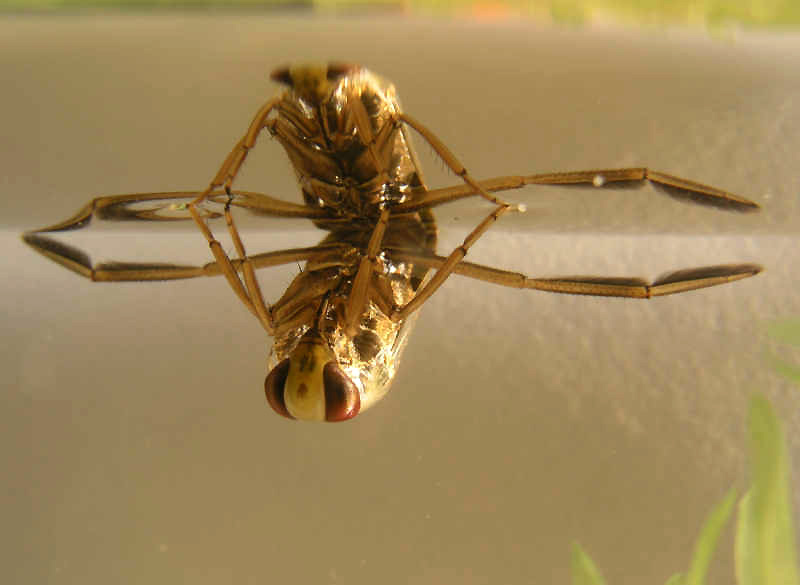
Common backswimmer (Notonecta glauca)

The best-known genus of backswimmers is Notonecta – streamlined, deep-bodied bugs up to 1.6 cm (0.6 in) long, green, brown, or yellowish in colour. The common backswimmer, N. glauca, is widespread in Europe, including the United Kingdom where it is known as the greater water boatman. Another of the same region, N. maculata, is distinguished by its mottled brick-coloured forewings.

In contrast to other aquatic insects that cling to submerged objects, the two genera Anisops and Buenoa use a unique system to stay submerged: using the extra oxygen supply from haemoglobin in their abdomen, instead of using oxygen dissolved in the water. The size of these air bubbles, which provide buoyancy, changes as the nitrogen dissolves into the blood and the oxygen is used in respiration. This allows for regulation of the size of the air bubbles and their concentration of oxygen.
