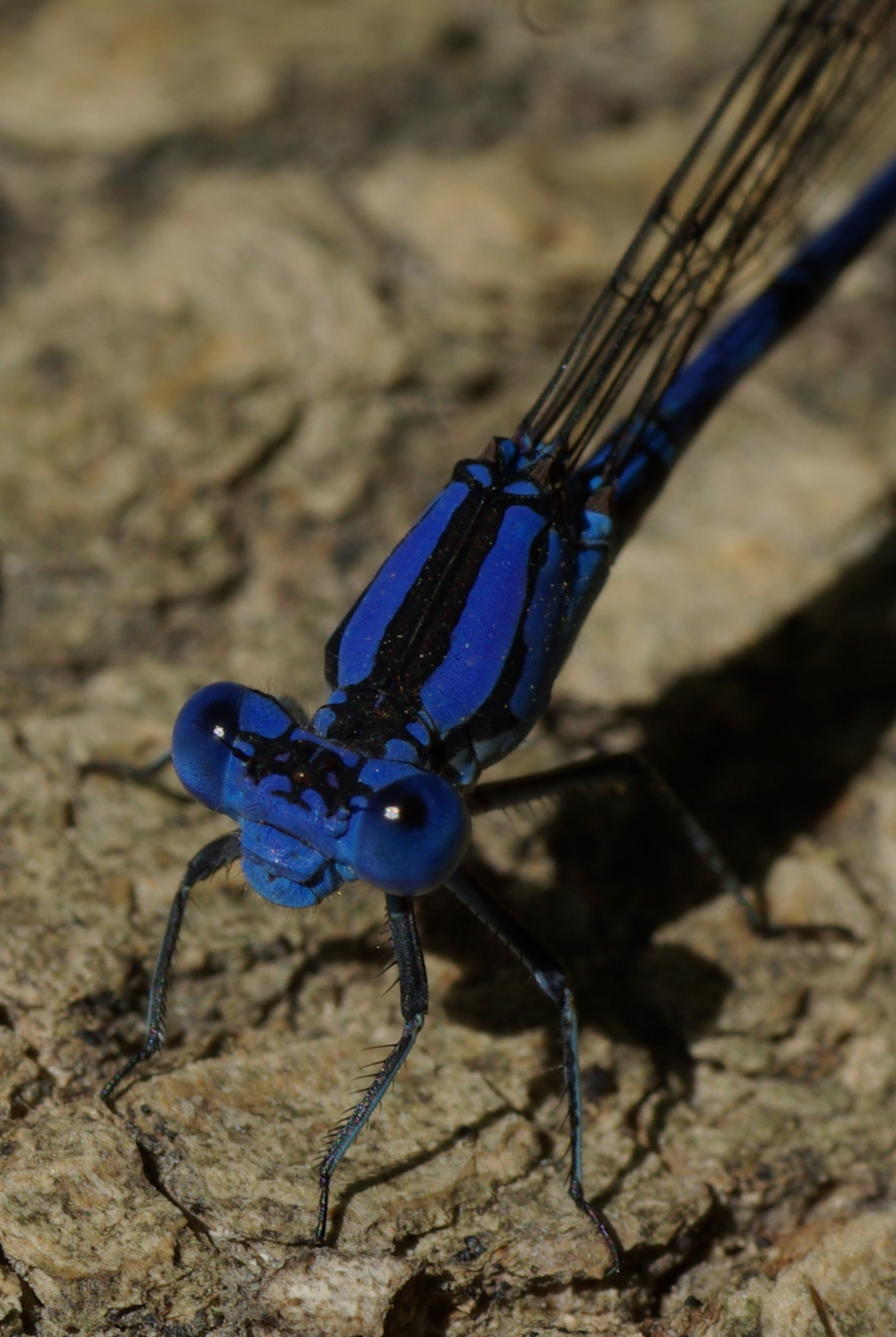

Conservation status
- Least Concern (IUCN 3.1)

Scientific classification
- Kingdom: Animalia
- Phylum: Arthropoda
- Class: Insecta
- Order: Odonata
- Suborder: Zygoptera
- Family: Coenagrionidae
- Genus: Argia
- Species: A. funebris

Binomial name
- Argia funebris (Hagen, 1861)
- Range of A. funebris

= Springwater dancer =

Species of damselfly

The springwater dancer (Argia funebris) is a damselfly of the family Coenagrionidae.

== Description ==
The springwater dancer has a black stripe along the side of its thorax. The male is typically blue, but some can be violet. The female is pale brown.

== Similar species ==
Its central range helps to distinguish it from the other blue damselflies with which it is easily confused, especially the similar looking vivid dancer. The Apache dancer is larger, but with an overall length of 34-40mm the springwater tends to be larger than the other similar blue dancers including the lavender dancer. The stripe on the side of the thorax is forked in the Aztec dancer and variable dancer.

== Etymology ==
The springwater dancer's preferred habitat of shallow springs is reflected in its common name. The previous scientific epithet, plana, means flat or wandering, but the significance is unknown. This epithet has changed to funebris in 2022 after new analyses. This new epithet is in reference of a funeral, however, its allusion is unknown
