= Assabet River =

River in the United States

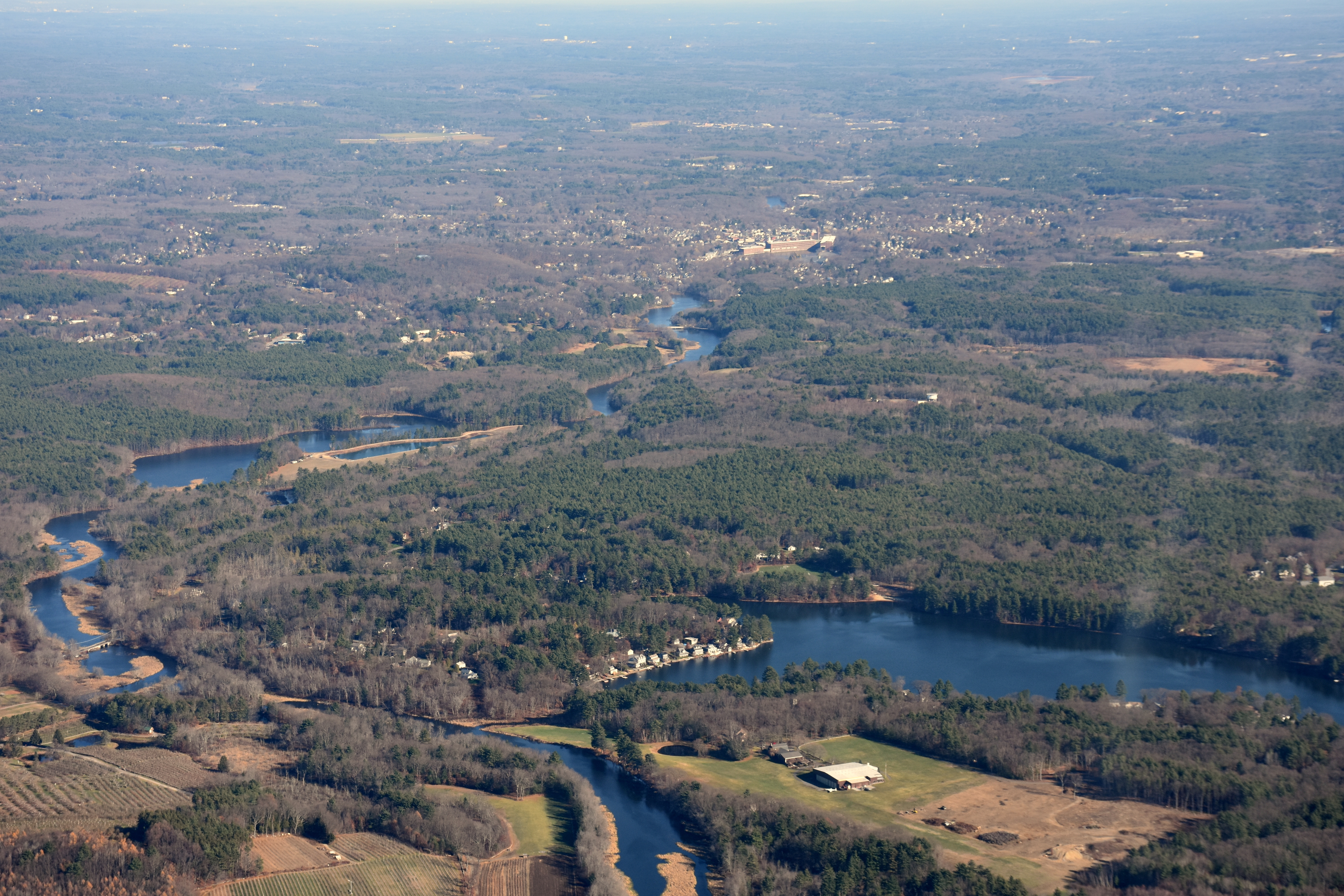
- Assabet River channel in Stow, Massachusetts
- Etymology: uncertain

Location
- Country: United States
- State: Massachusetts

Physical characteristics
- Length: 34.4 mi (55.4 km)

National Wild and Scenic River
- Type: Recreational
- Designated: April 9, 1999

The Assabet River is a small, 34.4-mile (55.4 km) long river located about 20 miles (30 km) west of Boston, Massachusetts, United States. The Assabet rises from a swampy area known as the Assabet Reservoir in Westborough, Massachusetts, and flows northeast before merging with the Sudbury River at Egg Rock in Concord, Massachusetts, to become the Concord River. The Organization for the Assabet, Sudbury and Concord Rivers (OARS), headquartered in West Concord, Massachusetts, is a non-profit organization dedicated to the preservation, protection, and enhancement of the natural and recreational features of these three rivers and their watershed. As the Concord River is a tributary of the Merrimack River, it and the Assabet and Sudbury rivers are part of the larger Merrimack River watershed.

== Etymology ==
The indigenous people of this region first named the Assabet River, though the original meaning of the word "Assabet" is uncertain. Assabet is said to come from the Algonquian word for "the place where materials for making fish nets comes from". Other cited Algonquian meanings include "at the miry place", "it is miry", or "the reedy place".

It is also possible to decode the name Assabet in the Eastern Algonquian Loup language spoken by the Nipmuc people who lived and fished on the river prior to European settlement. The word assa-pe-t segments into: assa, "turn back"; pe, a short form of nippe, "water", used in compounds; and a locative suffix, -t, a shorter form of -et after the vowel, so its name in Loup means "at the place where the river turns back". During floods the Assabet River reaches peak height sooner than the Sudbury River, so that at the junction of the two rivers the Sudbury's direction of flow can temporarily reverse.

A Eurocentric interpretation is that the river's name is a corrupted spelling of Elizabeth, or an attempted transliteration of the Nipmuc name. Various historic maps and documents denote the river's name as Asibath, Assabeth, Asabett, Assabet, Elizbeth, Elzibeth, Elizabet, Elizabeth, Elsabeth, Elsibeth, and Isabaeth. The uniform spelling "Assabet" was not adopted until at least 1850. Historic maps up until 1835 mostly label the river the Elizabeth or some variation thereof, but by 1856 maps consistently call it the Assabet. The name's history is further complicated by the fact that the tributary Elizabeth Brook in present-day Stow flows into the Assabet River.

== History ==
Indigenous people lived in what became central Massachusetts for thousands of years prior to European settlement. Indigenous oral histories, archaeological evidence, and European settler documents attest to historic settlements of the Nipmuc near and along the Assabet River. Nipmuc settlements on the Assabet intersected with the territories of three other related Algonquian-speaking peoples: the Massachusett, Pennacook, and Wampanoag.

== Geography ==
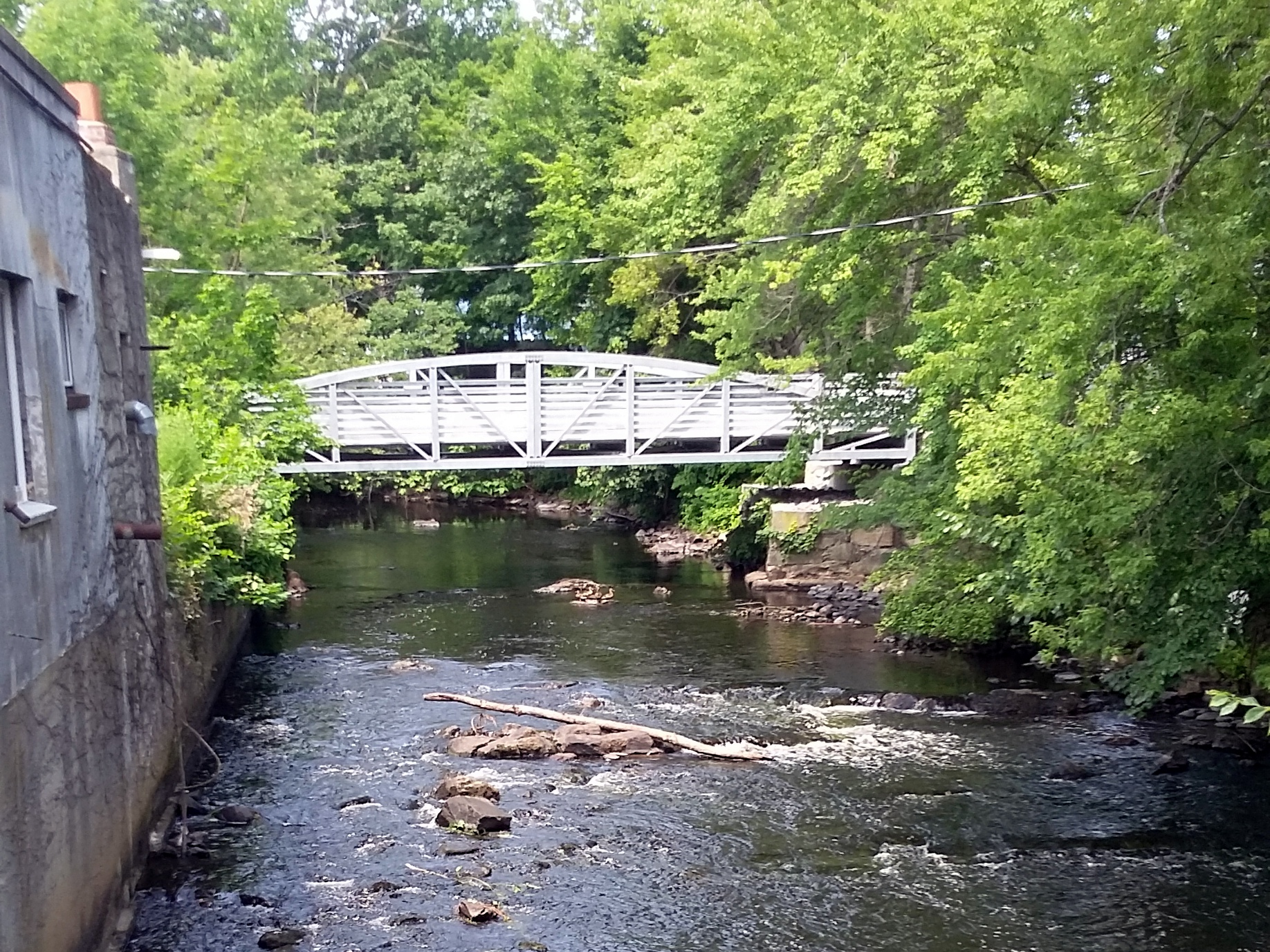
Bridge completed in 2017 for the Assabet River Rail Trail in downtown Maynard

The Assabet River rises from a 310-acre (130 ha) swampy area in Westborough known as the Assabet Reservoir. Streams located in the towns of Shrewsbury and Grafton feed the reservoir. From Westborough the river flows northeast 34.4 miles (55.4 km), starting at an elevation of 320 feet (98 m) and descending through the towns of Northborough, Marlborough, Berlin, Hudson, Stow, Maynard, Acton, and finally Concord, where it merges with the Sudbury River at Egg Rock (42.4653°N 71.3584°W) at an elevation of 100 feet (30 m) to form the Concord River.

The Assabet's watershed covers 177 square miles (460 km^{2}). The Assabet marshes in Stow measure about 900 acres (360 ha), and the Assabet River National Wildlife Refuge and environs in Stow, Maynard, Sudbury, and Marlborough encompass 2,600 acres (1,100 ha).

=== Average and low flow ===
According to U.S. Geological Survey records the average flow at the gauge in Maynard is 200 cubic feet (5.7 m^{3}) per second. February, March, and April flows average greater than 300 cubic feet (8.5 m^{3}) per second. July, August, and September flows average less than 100 cubic feet (2.8 m^{3}) per second, with some weekly flows averaging less than 40 cubic feet (1.1 m^{3}) per second. Five municipal wastewater treatment plants discharge cleaned water into the Assabet River (three upstream of the Maynard gauge). In summer months this cumulative contribution of more than 10,000,000 US gallons (38,000,000 L) per day (roughly 10 cubic feet (0.28 m^{3}) per second) can be more than half of the river's total volume.

=== Human geography ===
As of 2020 there are nine dams on the Assabet River. Seven dams powered mills: Aluminum City, Allen Street, Hudson, Gleasondale, Ben Smith, Powdermill, and Damonmill / Westvale. The Nichols and Tyler dams are modern dams built for flood control. Damonmill Dam is partially breached so it does not retain water, though it slows flow at flood times. A tenth mill dam—Paper Mill Dam in Maynard—was destroyed by the 1927 flood. As of 2020, 39 road bridges, two Assabet River Rail Trail pedestrian and cycle bridges, the Taylor Memorial Bridge (a pedestrian bridge) in Hudson, one abandoned railroad bridge in Hudson, and one active railroad bridge in Concord cross the river.

The Powdermill Dam was constructed to power the American Powder Mills, a complex of 40 buildings situated on 400 acres (160 ha) along both sides of the river through the towns of Acton, Concord, Maynard, and Sudbury. The complex manufactured gunpowder between 1835 and 1940. Evidence of 23 recorded explosions during that period remains at a few locations along the river. Acton Hydro Company, Inc., currently owns the dam and is renovating it to generate electricity again. None of the other historic mill dams presently provide hydropower.

== Biology ==
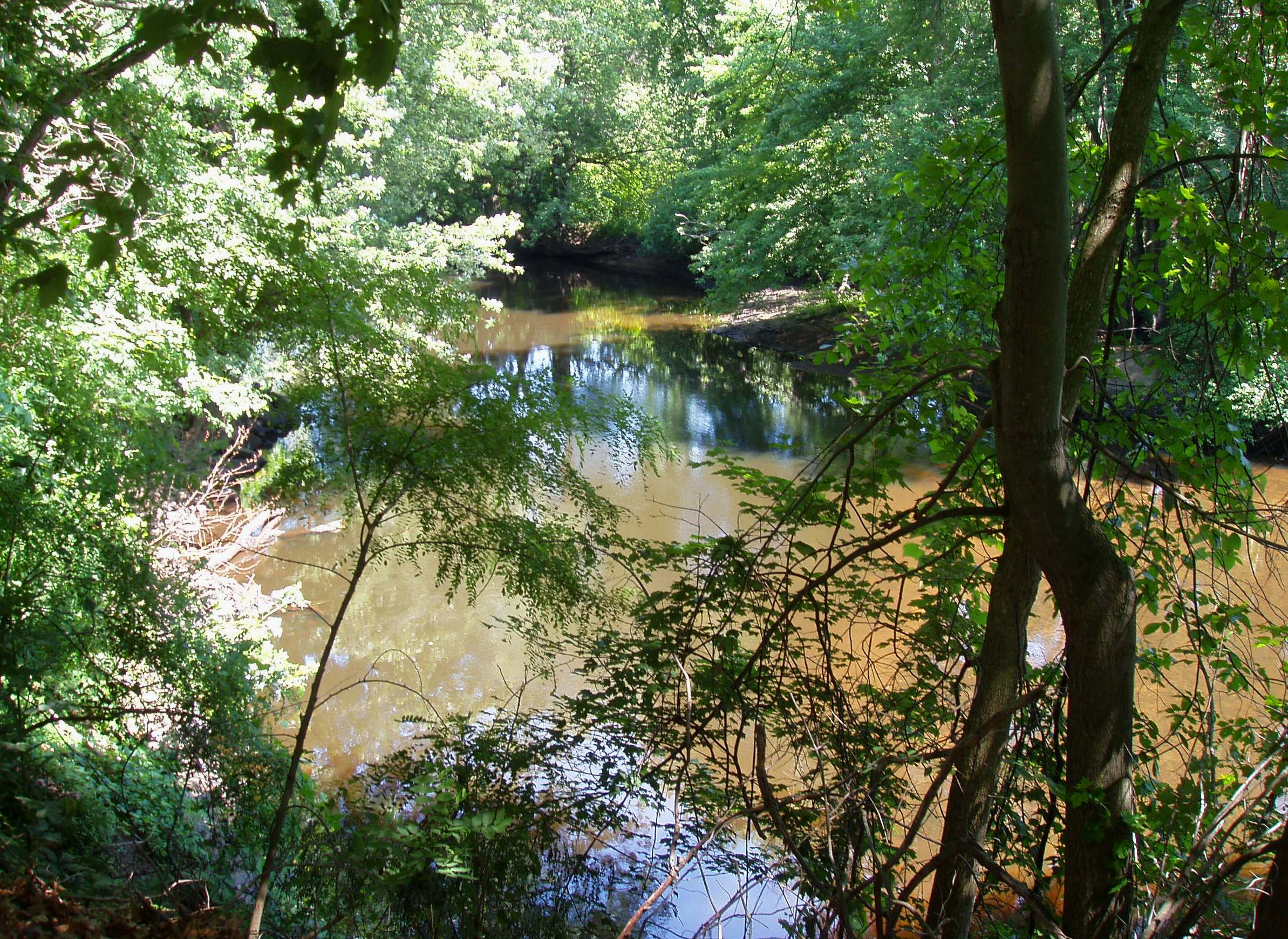
The Assabet River near Route 2, Concord, Massachusetts

Despite its small watershed area and habitat loss to suburbanization, the Assabet River and greater Concord River basin host many native and naturalized species of trees, wildflowers, aquatic plants, birds, fish, mammals, reptiles, amphibians, crustaceans, and insects. Introduced invasive plants threaten the continued health and presence of native plants along the river.

=== Native and naturalized species ===
Trees native to the Assabet River area include red maple, silver maple, black willow, river birch, hemlock, and swamp white oak. They are joined by the native shrubs buttonbush, common elderberry, highbush blueberry, multiflora rose, smooth arrowwood, and sweet pepperbush.

Wildflowers abound along the Assabet's banks. Blue flag and yellow flag—the latter particularly abundant between Hudson and Stow—grace the riverbanks with color. Other wildflowers present in the area include arrow arum, arrowweed, bittersweet nightshade, cardinal flower, jewelweed, joe-pye weed, pickerelweed, purple loosestrife, swamp loosestrife, swamp smartweed, sweetflag, true forget-me-not, and the poisonous water hemlock. Marsh plants habitating the area include various species of bur-reed (but predominantly Sparganium americanum), cinnamon fern, common cattail, great bulrush, marsh fern, marsh mermaid weed, reed canary grass, royal fern, soft rush, tussock sedge, and wild rice. Native aquatic plants present on or under the Assabet's waters include common elodea, coontail, duckweed, low watermilfoil, various species of pondweeds, water celery, watermeal, watershield, white water lily, and yellow pond lily.

Given the Assabet's proximity to differing habitats such as forests, pastures, fields, and marshes, a wide variety of birds live in or migrate to the area. The belted kingfisher—the only kingfisher of the northeastern United States—summers and sometimes winters on the lower Assabet. The migratory American yellow warbler, Baltimore oriole, common grackle, common yellowthroat, eastern kingbird, gray catbird, northern flicker, tree swallow, and wood thrush inhabit the area in the springs, summers, and sometimes falls. Other species—black-capped chickadee, cedar waxwing, downy woodpecker, tufted titmouse, and white-breasted nuthatch—live near the Assabet all year round. Some bird species visible from the river inhabit primarily fields, pastures, and old buildings, including American woodcock, barn swallow, bobolink, killdeer, and song sparrow. Bobolinks nest in the grass at Orchard Hill in Stow along the Assabet. The barn swallows feed over the water near Tyler Dam in Marlborough; some of them nest in the grass with the bobolinks while others live in a barn near Orchard Hill. A subset of birds living near or on the Assabet prefer marshy environments, including American bittern, black-crowned night heron, great blue heron, green heron, marsh wren, and red-winged blackbird.

A variety of migratory and nonmigratory ducks habitate the Assabet watershed, including American black duck, blue-winged teal, common merganser, mallard, pied-billed grebe, ring-necked duck, and wood duck. Depending on the time of year, one may see some birds of prey along the Assabet. The osprey is uncommon but may be encountered near the Assabet, especially in Stow and Hudson. The migratory broad-winged hawk is common in the fall, while the red-tailed hawk lives in the area year-round. American kestrels and northern harriers hunt in the area primarily during the fall.

Naturally, multiple fish species inhabit the river. Brook trout, chain pickerel, and largemouth bass are common. The Massachusetts Division of Fisheries and Wildlife stocks brook trout in the Assabet's tributaries, including the above-mentioned Elizabeth Brook, though there are existing natural populations. Chain pickerel live in weedy areas along the Assabet. Largemouth bass thrive in the Assabet Reservoir and in the calm waters before Hudson. Other native fish one may encounter on the Assabet include American eel, black crappie, brown bullhead, golden shiner, northern pike, pumpkinseed, white sucker, white perch, yellow perch, and a few other small species.

Common mammals living near the Assabet include minks, muskrats, raccoons, red foxes, and white-tailed deer. North American river otters are less common but may be encountered along the river. The little brown bat was once abundant in the area before decimation by the fungal disease white-nose syndrome; other bat species remain present in large numbers.

A few native reptile species inhabit the Assabet's waters. Some species—such as common snapping turtle, common watersnake, eastern garter snake, painted turtle, and ribbon snake—are relatively abundant. Other reptiles—Blanding's turtle and spotted turtle—are critically endangered, and though present along the Assabet are rarely seen by humans. Various native amphibians inhabit the Assabet River watershed. Common species include American bullfrog, green frog, leopard frogs, and pickerel frog, all of whose vocalizations may be heard during the spring and summer. Spring peeper, wood frog, and eastern newt also live in the area. At least one crustacean calls the Assabet home: freshwater crayfish of the genus Cambarus.

The Assabet's shaded banks provide prime mating grounds for damselfly and dragonfly species, as they mate near streams and wetlands and lay their eggs underwater. Damselfly species in the area include bluet, black-winged damselfly, eastern forktail (Massachusetts's most common damselfly), and violet dancer. Dragonfly species mating along the Assabet include cherry-faced meadowhawk and other species of the genus Sympetrum, common whitetail, the migratory green darner, and twelve-spotted skimmer. Aquatic insects plying the Assabet's waters include common water strider, giant water bugs of the genus Belostoma, grousewinged backswimmer and other species of backswimmers, various species of water boatmen, and whirligig beetles of genera Dineutus and Gyrinus.

=== Invasive species ===
Water caltrop, more commonly known as water chestnut, is an invasive aquatic plant native to western Asia. It was initially introduced in the United States in the 1870s in Cambridge, Massachusetts, followed by deliberate introduction into ponds near the Concord and Sudbury Rivers. It is now an invasive, habitat-destroying plant across many eastern states, including along the Assabet River. On the Assabet River, OARS organizes an annual plant pulling event in early July. Volunteers in canoes hand-pull the surface-floating rosettes of leaves and nuts before the nuts mature and fall to the river bottom.

Other invasive species in the Assabet basin include the aquatic plant European water clover and the fish carp.

=== Extirpated species ===
Alewife is an anadromous species of herring found in North America, meaning it mates and is born in freshwater but lives most of its life in saltwater. In pre-colonial and early colonial times, during their spring mating season alewife swam from the Atlantic Ocean upstream into the Merrimack River and then up the Concord, Assabet, and Sudbury rivers. The Industrial Age brought mill dams to these rivers. The dams denied alewife access to the upper reaches of the rivers, causing their local extinction.

Beaver was common in the Assabet watershed in pre-colonial times. Concord was in part founded as a beaver pelt trading site between Native Americans and English colonists. Around 1630 it was estimated more than 10,000 beaver pelts were being taken annually in land that now makes up Massachusetts and Connecticut. Due to aggressive hunting, European settlers extirpated beaver from Massachusetts by 1750. Reintroduction to the state started in the Berkshires around 1930, then spread east. Beavers once again populate the Assabet River watershed: they are numerous enough that stream culverts under roads need to be periodically cleared of in-progress beaver dams, and beavers down trees on land adjacent to the river for food, dam construction, and den building. Licensed trappers are hired to remove nuisance beaver families. Where not intruding on human space, beavers improve the local ecology. Beaver dams create wetlands which foster wildlife diversity, contribute water to underlying aquifers, and combat summer droughts.

== Historic floods and flood control ==
The official designation of major flooding on the Assabet River is a water depth of more than 7 feet (2.1 m) and a flow rate of 2,300 cubic feet (65 m^{3}) per second as measured at the gauge maintained by the U.S. Geological Survey on a site near the Waltham Street Bridge in Maynard. The gauge site is downstream of 114 square miles (300 km^{2}) of the 177 square miles (460 km^{2}) making up the Assabet River drainage. Major tributaries below the gauge which can contribute to downstream flooding are Fort Pond, Spencer, and Nashoba brooks.

=== 1927 ===
According to the National Weather Service, "The 1927 hurricane season brought a tropical storm that swept northward across western New England on Nov. 3-4, 1927. As its warm, humid air rose over the mountains and hills, torrential rains fell, causing severe flooding over extensive areas in virtually all of northern New England and the upper Hudson basin in New York. Much of New England had been soaked by rains throughout October. In all, 85 people were lost." Locally, the November 11, 1927, issue of The Maynard News reported damaged bridges, flooding at mill buildings closest to the river, and flooding further east at American Powder Mills. The Waltham Street Bridge was destroyed in the flood. The bridge dated to 1840, and was widened to accommodate an electric trolley track and sidewalk in 1900. The bridge was replaced in 1928 and again in 2013.

=== 1936 ===
The Great Flood of 1936 was described as the worst flood in New England since 1850. Damage in Massachusetts was estimated in excess of $200 million at the time. The severe winter of 1935-36 had deep snowfalls and long cold snaps that iced streams and rivers solid. Spring came early, with mild weather and heavy rain. By mid-March, rivers were rising across the state. Locally, the flood damaged bridges and washed out roads.

=== 1955 ===
The 1955 floods occurred when remnants of Hurricane Diane reached New England. The Assabet River crested at 8.94 feet (2.72 m), the highest water level measured since record keeping began in 1942. According to a Maynard resident, "In August of 1955 my parents brought me to see water flowing over the bridge. We stood on the south side, on Waltham Street."

=== 1968 and 1979 ===
The 1968 and 1979 floods were the first major floods after two flood control dams were built upstream. Both floods peaked at 8.1 feet (2.5 m) at the gauge. In Maynard the 1968 flood put water over the retaining wall next to the mill buildings, necessitating sandbagging and pumping to save factory equipment belonging to Digital Equipment Corporation, which owned the entire mill complex at the time. The equally high water of January 1979 did not reach the mill because Digital had heightened the retaining wall. Walnut Street flooded: AT&T had to sandbag its building on the Walnut Street side.

=== Flood control ===
Three major and eight minor flood control sites hold back high water in times of floods. The George H. Nichols Dam was built in Westborough in 1968 or 1969, the Tyler Dam in Marlborough in 1965, and the Delaney Complex (on the Elizabeth Brook tributary) in Stow in 1971. The minor sites are on other tributary brooks. Collectively, these have a flood hold-back capacity in excess of 3.5 trillion US gallons (1.3×10^{13} L). The Nichols Dam also serves as a water-providing reserve in times of low water, to help maintain some flow in the river. The two most recent major floods were in 1987 and 2010; for both, water level at the gauge peaked at 7.1 feet (2.2 m), and volume was 2,500 cubic feet (71 m^{3}) per second.

== In literature ==
Nathaniel Hawthorne wrote in praise of the river in his collection of short stories Mosses from an Old Manse:

Rowing our boat against the current, between wide meadows, we turn aside into the Assabeth. A more lovely stream than this, for a mile above its junction with the Concord, has never flowed on earth, — nowhere, indeed, except to lave the interior of a poet's imagination. It is sheltered from the breeze by woods and a hillside; so that elsewhere there might be a hurricane, and here scarcely a ripple across the shaded water.

Henry David Thoreau regularly visited and often took his students, including Louisa May Alcott, on educational boat trips up the Assabet River. Thoreau wrote a poem titled "The Assabet" to a love interest; its first stanza references rowing upon the river and reads:

Up this pleasant stream let's row
For the livelong summer's day,
Sprinkling foam where'er we go
In wreaths as white as driven snow—
Ply the oars, away! away!

Thoreau reflected on the Assabet's natural sensory pleasures in his journal, contrasting them favorably against the heights of human endeavor and creation:

July 10, 1852 Assabet River
I wonder if any Roman emperor ever indulged in such luxury as this—of walking up and down a river in torrid weather with only a hat to shade the head. What were the baths of Caracalla to this? Now we traverse a long water plan some two feet deep; now we descend into a darker river valley, where the bottom is lost sight of and the water rises to our armpits; now we go over a hard iron pan; now we stoop and go under a low bough of the Salix nigra; now we slump into soft mud amid the pads of the Nymphaea odorata, at this hour shut.

== See also ==
- Assabet River Rail Trail
- Assabet River National Wildlife Refuge
- List of rivers of Massachusetts
