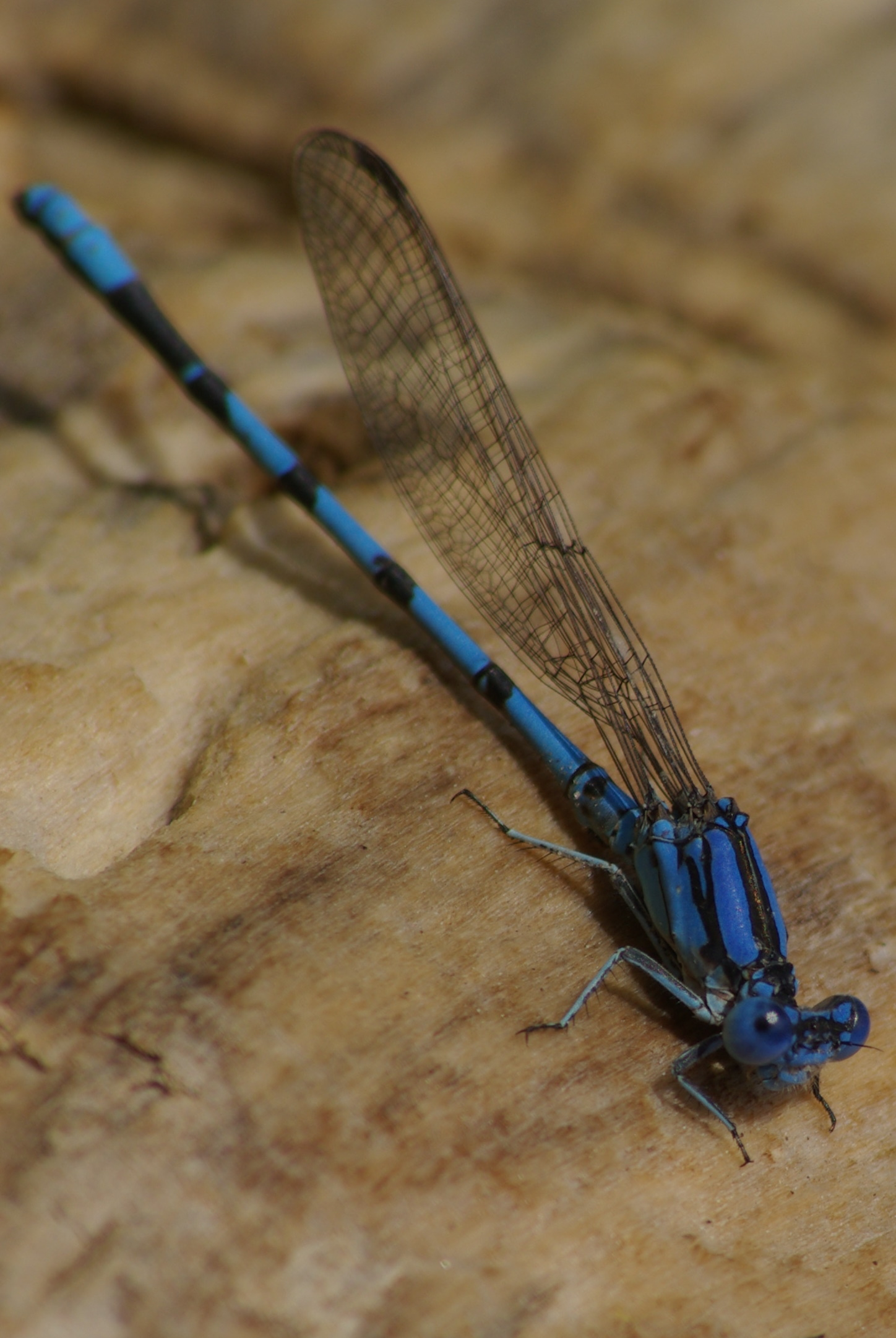

Scientific classification
- Kingdom: Animalia
- Phylum: Arthropoda
- Clade: Pancrustacea
- Class: Insecta
- Order: Odonata
- Suborder: Zygoptera
- Family: Coenagrionidae
- Genus: Argia
- Species: A. nahuana

Binomial name
- Argia nahuana (Calvert, 1902)
- Range of A. nahuana

= Aztec dancer =

Species of damselfly

The Aztec dancer (Argia nahuana) damselfly is one of the pond damsels. Common name originates from the Aztecs, and scientific names comes from the Nahuas.

== Physical Description ==
The dark black stripe on the side of the thorax is forked from front to back. Other field marks include blue postocular spots, pale blue legs with a black stripe, and a blue ring on the seventh segment of the abdomen. Can be differentiated from similar subspecies by the larger width of the stripe down its mid dorsal thorax, and medial orientation of the cercus lobe. Additionally, the forewing contains four quadrangular cells and the hindwing has three. Females look similar to males with the exception of their mainly light brown coloring as opposed to the males' bright blue.

=== Similar species ===
Other dancers share many physical traits with the Aztec dancer, and often occupy similar regions. Most commonly confused with Argia nahuana are Argia agrioides, Argia leonorae, Argia fumipennis, and Argia hinei. Aztec dancers were originally considered a variation of California dancers (Argia agrioides), until declared its own species in 1958.

== Habitat ==
Aztec dancers are most common in the Southwest, including many parts of Mexico and states like California, Arizona, Texas, and Kansas. They reside in clear water streams with shallow water, high sun exposure, and minimal vegetation lining the water.

== Sightings ==
First recorded sighting was in 1894. Between then and 1975, 115 sightings were reported, as compared to the post-1980 count of 35 sightings.
