= Egg Rock =

Outcrop in Concord, Massachusetts

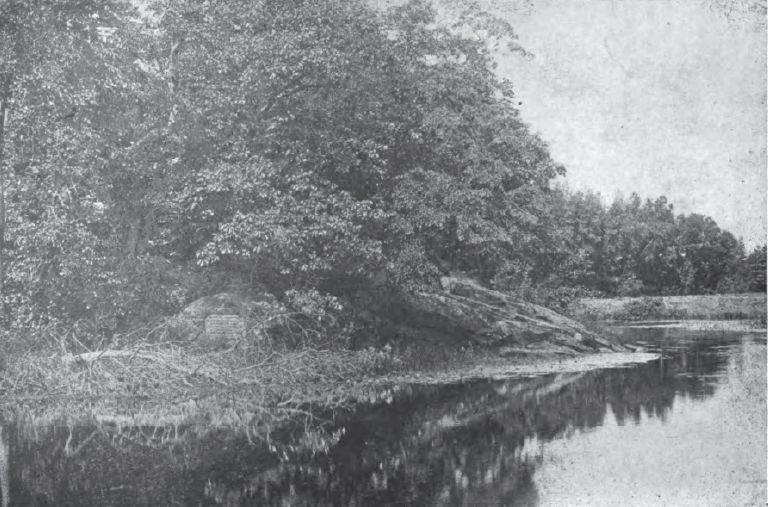
- View of Egg Rock around 1900, from "The History of Concord, Massachusetts", 1904

- Location within Massachusetts
- Location: Middlesex, Massachusetts, United States
- Coordinates: 42°27′54.36″N 71°21′30.6″W
- Length: .1 km (0.062 mi)
- Width: .05 km (0.031 mi)
- Elevation: 39 m (128 ft)
- Named for: Located on egg-shaped intermittent island; rock outcropping may appear egg-shaped from some perspectives

Egg Rock is an outcrop of Silurian Straw Hollow Diorite at the confluence of the Assabet and Sudbury rivers, where they form the Concord River in Concord, Massachusetts. The outcrop is located on a roughly oval intermittent island of about 100 by 50 meters. Egg Rock is usually accessible using foot trails over land, but during high river levels the island is separated from the mainland by a narrow channel. The highest point of Egg Rock is about 39 meters above mean sea level and about 6 meters above normal river level.

The United States Geological Survey (USGS) Geographic Names Information System (GNIS) includes Egg Rock as GNIS feature 617309, classified as an island. In the GNIS database as of February 2010, the listed position (latitude 42.4645383, longitude -71.3592266) is misplaced by about 125 meters to the southwest, and is not actually located on the intermittent island. A more correct position is latitude 42.4651, longitude -71.3585.

== The inscription on Egg Rock ==
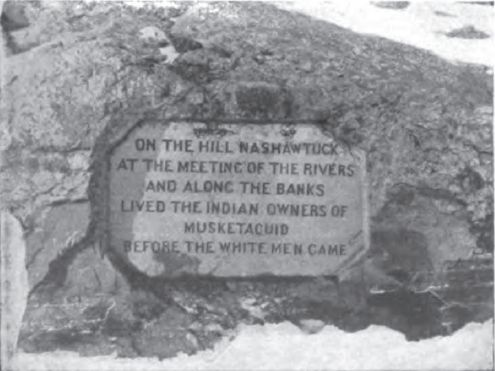
Photo of Egg Rock inscription, about 1900

An inscription was carved into the rock in 1885 to commemorate the 250th anniversary of the 1635 founding of Concord:

On the hill Nashawtuck
at the meeting of the rivers
and along the banks
lived the Indian owners of
Musketaquid
before the white men came

The significance of the inscription would have been clear to most people familiar with local lore at the time it was carved, although it may seem cryptic now to many people who are unfamiliar with Concord's history and geography. The native Massachusett tribe used the Algonquian name Musketaquid for the surrounding area and its riverside meadows; the Algonquian words for "grass" and "ground" are muskeht and ahkeit. The Concord River and even the town of Concord were often called Musketaquid by writers in the nineteenth century, as may be noted in Henry David Thoreau's comment quoted below. The principal local settlement of the Massachusett tribe which remained in 1635 (after various European diseases devastated the original population in the preceding two decades) was nearby on the gentle slopes of Nashawtuc Hill, whose crest is about 500 meters southwest of Egg Rock. Negotiations initiated by Simon Willard with leaders of the tribe gave English settlers the right to live in the area, which came to be called "Concord" in appreciation of the peaceful acquisition.

The importance of Egg Rock to Concord's historical self-image may be seen in the fact that at the time of its execution in 1885, the Egg Rock inscription was one of just seven town-wide "lasting memorials of stone and bronze" which were designed and commissioned by the "Tablet sub-committee" of the Concord Celebration Committee. As Charles Hosmer Walcott, chairman of the Tablet sub-committee, declaimed in a speech he delivered during the Sept. 12, 1885 celebration, the seven memorials "form an epitome of the town's history for a century and a half—from the beginning of the plantation to the war of the revolution." Concerning the inscription on Egg Rock itself, he continued:

The simple words inscribed on the rugged face of the rock, where the rivers meet, will serve to remind us and succeeding generations of a people who have vanished from the face of the earth, leaving scarcely a trace of themselves, except a few arrow-heads and stone pestles, and, here and there, a mound or a heap of clam shells.

The inscription is carved into the eastern face of Egg Rock, and can be seen from a boat in the Sudbury River.

== Egg Rock and the three rivers in Concord's history and culture ==
Egg Rock's location has attracted people since before historic times. Stone relics of Native Americans have been found around Egg Rock.

Henry David Thoreau beautifully described the gentle character of the three rivers (the Sudbury, Assabet, and Concord rivers) near Concord, Massachusetts in his 1849 book, A Week on the Concord and Merrimack Rivers:

The Musketaquid, or Grass-ground River, though probably as old as the Nile or Euphrates, did not begin to have a place in civilized history, until the fame of its grassy meadows and its fish attracted settlers out of England in 1635, when it received the other but kindred name of CONCORD from the first plantation on its banks, which appears to have been commenced in a spirit of peace and harmony. It will be Grass-ground River as long as grass grows and water runs here; it will be Concord River only while men lead peaceable lives on its banks. [...] One branch of it [...] called Sudbury River, enters Concord at the south part of the town, and after receiving [at Egg Rock] the North or Assabeth River, which has its source a little farther to the north and west, goes out at the northeast angle [....] Concord River is remarkable for the gentleness of its current, which is scarcely perceptible, and some have referred to its influence the proverbial moderation of the inhabitants of Concord, [...] it appears to have been properly named Musketaquid, or Meadow River, by the Indians. For the most part, it creeps through broad meadows [....]

The typically tranquil quality of the rivers has helped make boating on the Concord, Sudbury, and Assabet rivers a favorite pastime and social activity for many Concord area residents since well before Thoreau's time. Egg Rock's location at the confluence of these rivers, and nearly in the center of Concord's land area, has resulted in its status as a notable landmark for many years.

Thoreau surveyed Nashawtuc Hill in December 1856 and January 1857, producing a map which included Egg Rock. During this time, in a January 16, 1857 entry in his journal, he wrote:

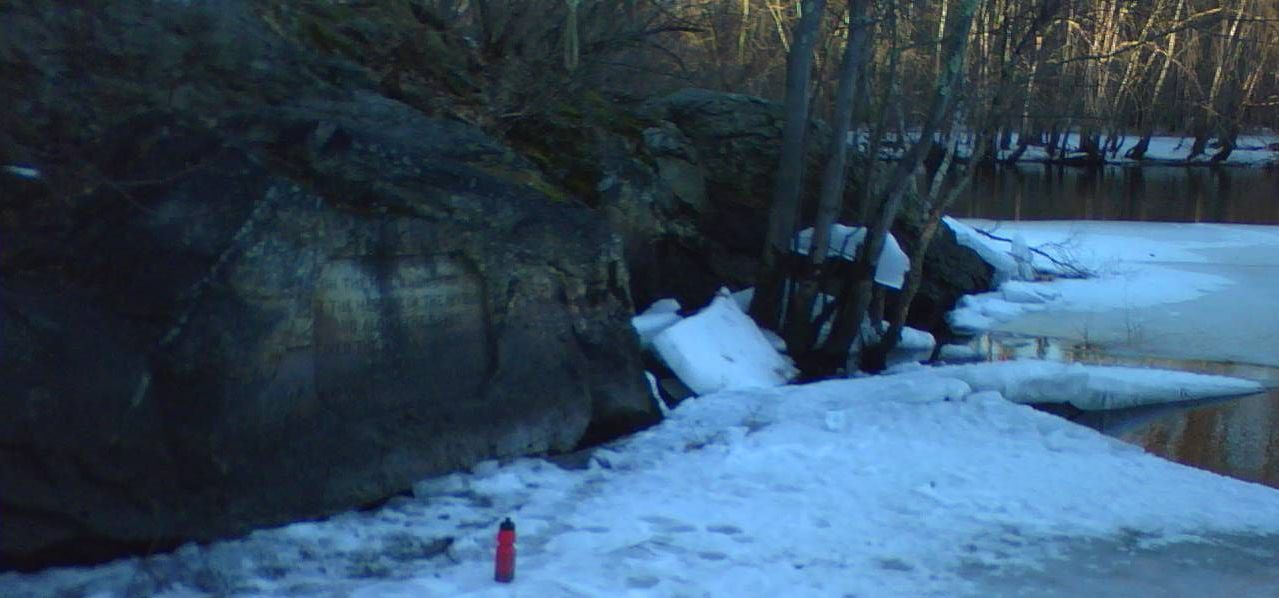
As in Thoreau's time, ice still "slants up" to Egg Rock in the winter of 2009–2010. High-water marks darken the lower half of the inscription.

Jan 16
PM up Assabet
This morning was one of the coldest. It improves the walking on the river--freezing the overflow beneath the snow. As I pass the Island (Egg Rock) I notice the ice foot adhering to the rock about 2 feet above the surface of the ice generally—the ice there for a few feet in width slants up to it & owing to this the snow is blown off it. This edging of ice revealed is peculiarly green by contrast with the snow methinks. So, too, where the ice settling has rested on a rock which has burst it & now hold it high above the surrounding level--

Thoreau and Ralph Waldo Emerson are reported to have sometimes enjoyed sitting on Egg Rock, watching the water flow by. Daniel Chester French, who sculpted the sitting figure of Lincoln in the Lincoln Memorial as well as the Minute Man statue just downstream from Egg Rock at the Old North Bridge and the statue of Emerson in the Concord Free Public Library, breakfasted there occasionally.

In recognition of its significance in Thoreau's life around Concord, the Thoreau Society, in its annual gatherings, has included a trip to Egg Rock among its several days of annual activities.

In the first stanza of his romantic 1875 poem “Floating Hearts,” George Bradford Bartlett considered Egg Rock among the major riverside vistas of Concord, alongside the Minute Man statue at the Old North Bridge and The Old Manse:

OpenStreetMap.org map of Egg Rock area, with foot trails

One of Indian summer's most perfect days
Is dreamily dying in golden haze,
Fair Assabet blushes in rosy bliss,
Reflecting the sun's warm good night kiss.
Through a fleet of leaf barques gold and brown,
From the radiant maples shaken down,
By the ancient hemlocks grim and gray
Our boat drifts slowly on its way;
Down past Egg Rock and the meadows wide,
Neath the old red bridge we slowly glide,
Till we see the Minute man strong and grand,
And the moss grown Manse in the orchard land.[...]

A carved monument to George Bradford Bartlett, similar to the Egg Rock inscription, was installed in 1986 on the right bank of the Assabet River about 200 meters upstream of Egg Rock.

The natural beauty of the rivers around Egg Rock has been extolled by several of America's most well-known authors. Of the stretch of the Assabet River immediately upstream of Egg Rock, Nathaniel Hawthorne wrote:

A more lovely stream than the Assabet for a mile above its junction with the Concord has never flowed on earth—nowhere, indeed, except to lave the interior regions of a poet's imagination.... It comes flowing softly through the midmost privacy and deepest heart of a wood which whispers it to be quiet; while the stream whispers back again from its sedgy borders, as if river and wood were hushing one another to sleep. Yes, the river sleeps along its course and dreams of the sky and the clustering foliage.

Hawthorne also mentioned Egg Rock in his short story, "The Village Uncle".

Beginning in the 1870s, many Concord area residents participated in social events on the rivers around Egg Rock. Egg Rock itself was a much-enjoyed location for holiday picnics and breakfasts in the summer. During that period, a “Carnival of Boats” was organized, with as many as 8000 participants and spectators, by one account. The boats gathered around Egg Rock and floated down the Concord River, many bearing Chinese-style lanterns and elaborate decorations similar to parade floats.

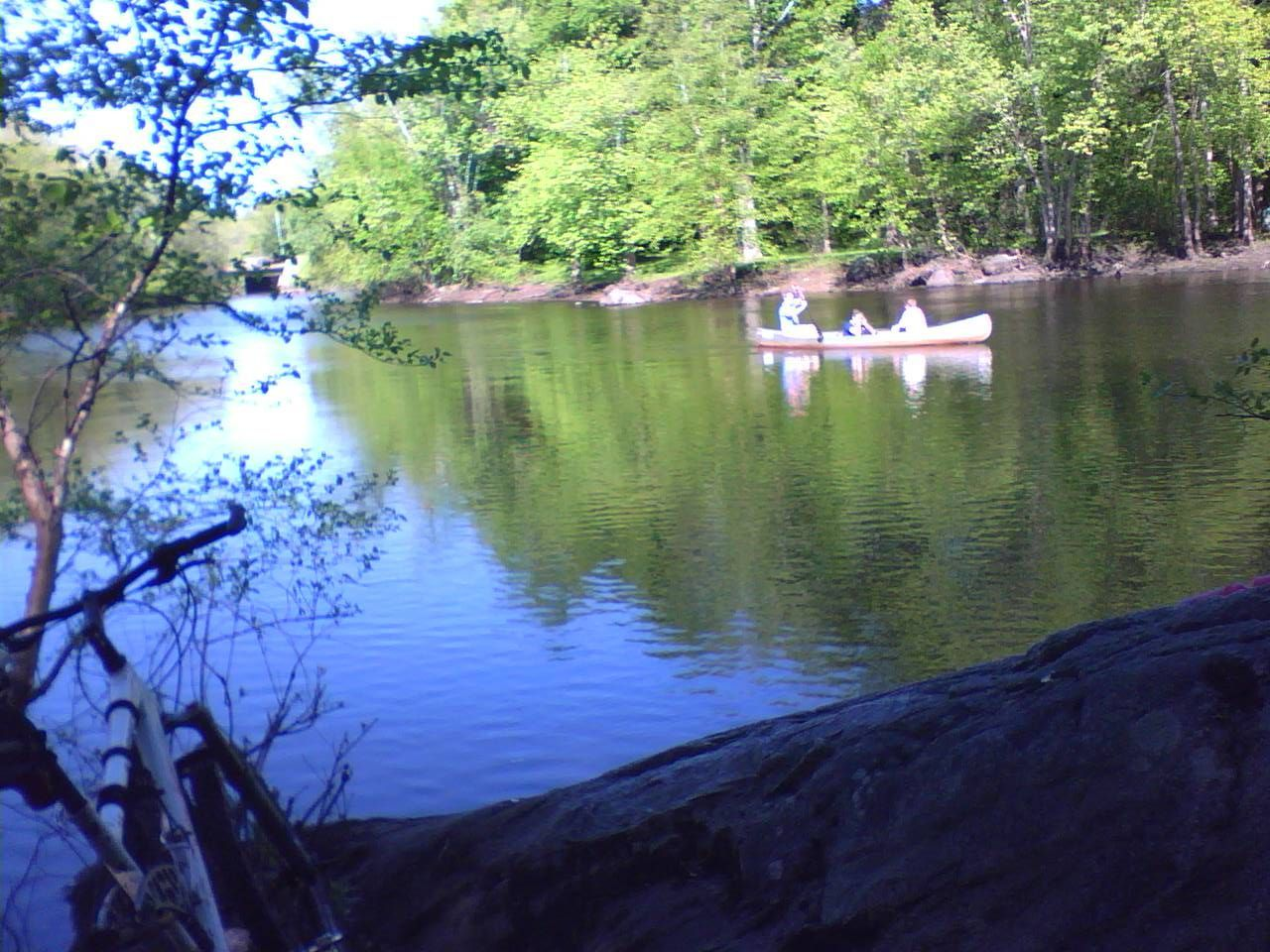
Canoeists paddling up the Sudbury River, seen from atop Egg Rock. The Concord River and Lowell Road bridge are in the background.

Although the clearing of surrounding woodlands and the building of the Reformatory Branch railroad disrupted the pristine atmosphere of Egg Rock's surroundings in the later 1800s, by the beginning of the 21st century, the area had largely returned to a more natural state. The designation of the Sudbury, Assabet, and Concord rivers as a part of the National Wild and Scenic Rivers System in 1999, and the permanent protection of many tracts of land bordering the rivers, appear to ensure long-term preservation of many of the natural values of this beautiful area.

Egg Rock continues to play a significant part in more modern celebrations of the waters surrounding Concord. The annual River Fest celebrated along the Sudbury, Assabet, and Concord rivers often includes an event at Egg Rock to perform “a blessing to honor the spirit of the river and the river of life." Egg Rock has been the site of a winter solstice ceremony sponsored by the Emerson Umbrella Center for the Arts, which included a bonfire. It has served as the starting point for an annual fund raising event produced by the local Milldam Nursery School, in which nearly 2000 yellow rubber ducks float down the Concord River from Egg Rock to the Lowell Road boat launch ramp, about 300 meters downstream.

Beyond events on the rivers themselves, Egg Rock appears regularly in a variety of forms in the local cultural scene. It has been the subject of several artistic works, including a painting by Lexington artist Michael Cunliffe Thompson entitled “Egg Rock,” which uses the Egg Rock inscription text to form its top and bottom borders, a large and striking painting by Concord artist Ilana Manolson in 2009, also entitled “Egg Rock,” and a similarly titled en plein air oil painting by Gregory Dysart of Natick. Egg Rock is also the inspiration for the name of a Concord area classical music quartet, the Egg Rock Quartet, which in 2009 performed “a lively evening of chamber music“ for the Concord Art Association.

== Access to Egg Rock ==
Many visitors pass by Egg Rock on boats as they travel between a popular boat rental establishment along the Sudbury River at Concord's South Bridge and the historic Old North Bridge. There is also a boat launch ramp at the Lowell Road bridge over the Concord River, about 300 meters downstream of Egg Rock. Depending on water levels, there are accessible landing spots nearby Egg Rock along the Sudbury River. Egg Rock is a popular picnic spot, with a few benches located on the higher ground.

Except during times of high river levels, Egg Rock is easily accessible by foot or off-road bicycle as well as from the water. Egg Rock itself is located within Concord's Egg Rock conservation land, an eight-acre (three-hectare) parcel donated to the town in 1942 through a bequest from Fannie Eleanor Wheeler. It is an easy (1 km) walk from Concord center or the Concord railway station on the Fitchburg Line from Boston. The Town of Concord suggests that visitors who travel by automobile to visit Egg Rock should park on Nashawtuc Road after crossing the Sudbury River, then walk about 200 meters along the driveway marked "Squaw Sachem Trail" (past all of the houses - as of 2014) to a path on the right, which leads to Egg Rock. The round trip walk averages about 30 minutes.

The trail to Egg Rock crosses a short segment of the Reformatory Branch Rail Trail. This segment runs through woodland about 1.5 kilometers to the northwest and about 200 meters to the east from the intersection; in both directions that trail ends at riverbanks where railroad bridges formerly stood. The rail trail to the northwest connects to other trails in the Simon Willard Woods and Korbet conservation lands, and provides good access to the scenic Assabet River bank. Beyond the former railroad bridge over the Sudbury River to the east, the Reformatory Branch Rail Trail continues for 7 kilometers as a dirt track to connect to the Minuteman Bikeway, a paved bikeway providing access from the Boston area.

A map for this location, available from OpenStreetMap (via the "Coordinates" link in the sidebar), provides detailed GPS-based tracks for the footpaths.

No legal restrictions prevent locals or tourists from visiting this historic site.
