= Fairhaven Bay =

Bay in Massachusetts, United States of America

Coordinates: 42.4255°N 71.3535°W

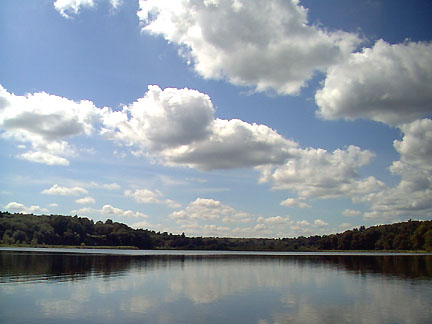
Fairhaven Bay

Fairhaven Bay is a lake located within the Sudbury river in Concord, Massachusetts, United States (US). It was frequented by Henry David Thoreau who, together with Edward Hoar, accidentally set fire to the woods near the bay in April 1844, as later described in Thoreau's journal.

In 1895, George Bradford Bartlett, ”well-known in connection with the Manse boathouse”, wrote of the cliffs near Fairhaven Bay on the Sudbury River: "For more than a hundred years these cliffs have been a favorite resort for the nature lover, and the climax of many a Sunday walk or autumnal holiday trip, as no better view can be had of the waving tree-tops and gentle river".

To the north, the bay is bordered by Wright Woods, owned by the Concord Land Conservation Trust. The woods, where Thoreau often walked, link the Fairhaven Bay trails and the Lincoln Conservation land with the Walden Pond State Reservation.
