= Cock-A-Doodle-Doo! =

1853 short story by Herman Melville

"Cock-A-Doodle-Doo! or, The Crowing of the Noble Cock Beneventano"
- Author: Herman Melville
- Language: English
- Genre: Short story
- Publisher: Harper's Magazine
- Publication date: December 1853
- Publication place: United States
- Media type: Print
- Pages: 46

Cock-A-Doodle-Doo! Or, The Crowing of the Noble Cock Beneventano is an 1853 short story by the American writer Herman Melville. It was first published in the December 1853 issue of Harper's Magazine, the same month the second installment of "Bartleby, the Scrivener" appeared in Putnam's. The story remained uncollected until 1922, when Princeton University Press included it in The Apple-Tree Table and Other Sketches.

== Plot ==
The narrator hears a powerful and invigorating rooster and thinks it is a bird imported by some rich farmer. The sound encourages him to confront his creditor. Roaming his part of the country, he discovers that the rooster is the property of a poor worker who will not sell it since its crowing is the only sustenance of his ill wife and children. Finally all in the poor family die.

== Analysis ==
Most scholars agree that this story satirizes Transcendentalist philosophy, in particular Henry David Thoreau's A Week on the Concord and Merrimack Rivers.
