= Concord River =

River in Massachusetts, United States

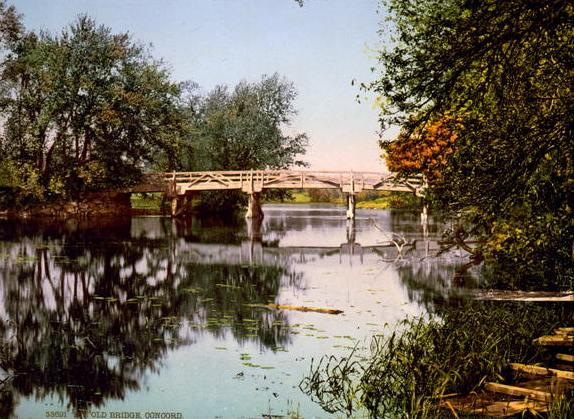
- The Concord River at the Old North Bridge, Concord, Massachusetts, circa 1900

Location
- Country: United States

Physical characteristics
- Source
  - location: Sudbury and Assabet Rivers, Concord, Massachusetts
  - coordinates: 42.4654°N 71.3580°W
  - elevation: 50 ft (15 m)
- Mouth
  - location: Merrimack River, Lowell, Massachusetts
  - coordinates: 42.6465°N 71.3025°W
- Length: 16.3 mi (26.2 km)
- Basin size: 377 sq mi (980 km^{2})

National Wild and Scenic River
- Type: Recreational
- Designated: April 9, 1999

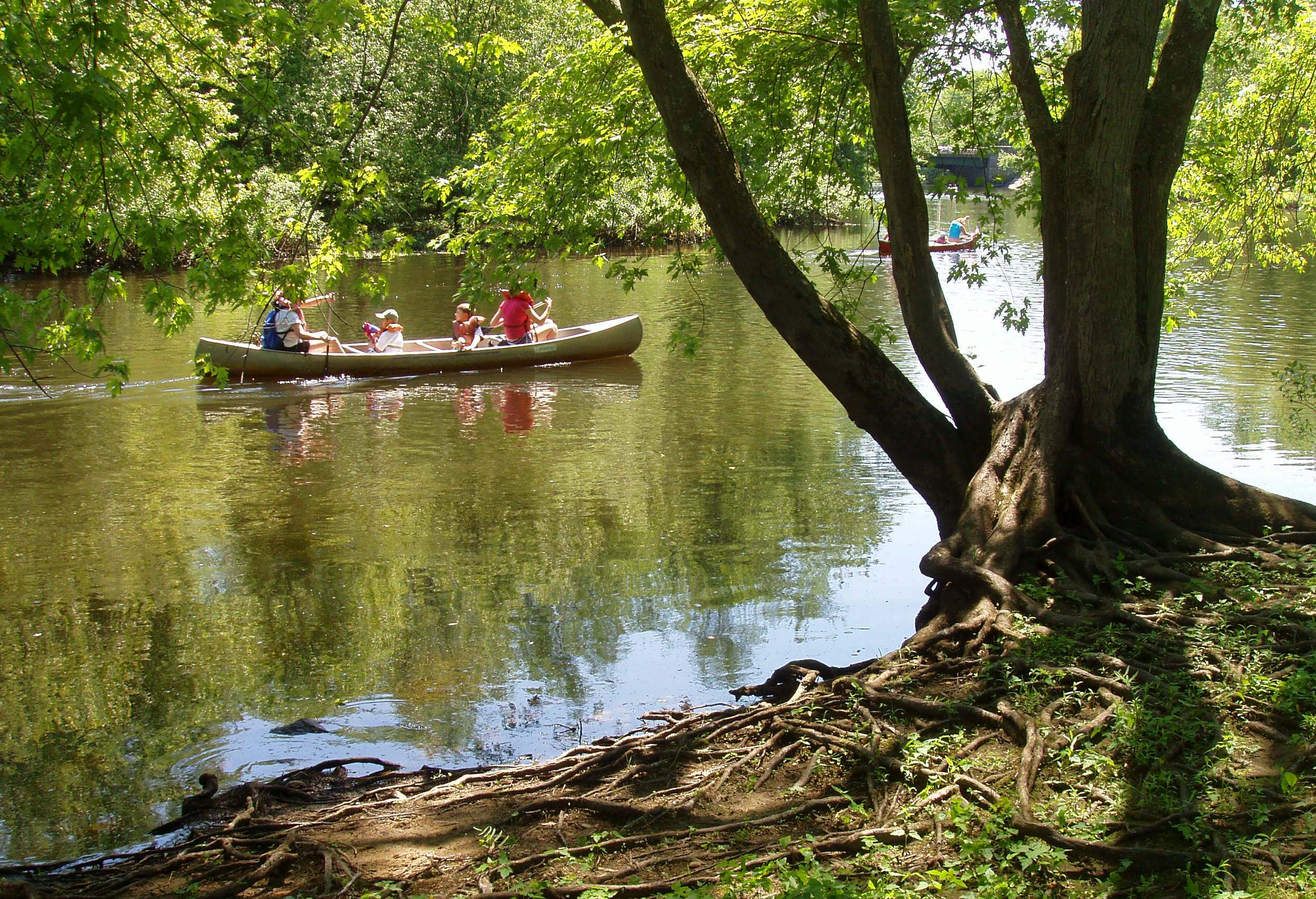
Canoes on the Concord River

The Concord River is a 16.3-mile-long (26.2 km) tributary of the Merrimack River in eastern Massachusetts, United States. The river drains a small rural, suburban region northwest of Boston. As one of the most notable small rivers in U.S. history, it was the scene of an important early battle of the American Revolutionary War and was the subject of a 19th-century book by Henry David Thoreau.

== Description and early history ==
The river begins in Middlesex County, formed by the confluence of the Sudbury and Assabet Rivers at Egg Rock, near the Concord town center. It flows generally north, from eastern Concord (along the northwestern edge of the Boston metropolitan area), joining the Merrimack River from the south on the eastern side of Lowell. It is a gently flowing stream with little variation in topography along most of its route. Its drainage basin stretches into Worcester County and includes 36 towns within Massachusetts.

Native Americans called it the Musketaquid or "grass-grown" river because its sluggish waters abound in aquatic or semi-aquatic vegetation and its banks are fringed with wild grasses and sedges which stretch for miles along both sides of this placid stream. This creates an ideal environment for a variety of fish, including bass, shad, alewife (river herring), pickerel, carp and American eel. Native Americans wove sticks in intricate designs to trap alewives and other migrating fish at the mouths of rivers throughout this region. 'Musketoquid' was listed as a 'noted habitation' of native people in New England in 1634.

By 1635, settlers from England began to arrive, giving the river its current name. On April 19, 1775, the Old North Bridge over the river in the town of Concord was the scene of the famous Battle of Concord (occurring on the same day when the first shots of the Revolutionary War were fired at nearby Lexington). The current version of the bridge (a reproduction) is preserved by the National Park Service.

Henry David Thoreau wrote his first book, A Week on the Concord and Merrimack Rivers, in 1849 while living at nearby Walden Pond. His book recounted a seven-day boat trip on the rivers with his brother John, who had since died. Thoreau recounted his exploration of the natural beauty of the river, and his accompanying thoughts on such eternal themes as truth, poetry, travel and friendship. Despite the development of suburbs near the river, it remains a popular canoeing destination today. The last mile of the river in Lowell is serious class 3+/4 whitewater.

== Dams cause fish population to decrease ==
Dams were built along the Concord River to increase crop production and also to provide a source of power for operating mills. As a result, by the 19th century, the native fish populations of shad and alewife became extinct because the dams prevented the mature fish from returning upstream to spawn. Alewife and other anadromous fish are migratory. They hatch in freshwater, make their way to the sea to mature, then return as adults to freshwater to spawn, usually near where they had hatched. This instinct is imprinted within the fish when it is born. When the route upstream became blocked, this cycle was broken and the fish were unable to survive without it. The Faulkner Dam in North Billerica is just one of many blockages that caused the alewife population to collapse on the Concord River. Water was later diverted north to Lowell and south to Charlestown to run the Middlesex Canal.

== Effects of pollution ==
During the 19th century, the Concord River was a hub of industrial activity during the US Industrial Revolution. This led to environmental challenges as industrial wastes, untreated sewage, and other organic waste were dumped into the river. Industrial development peaked in the 1920s, contributing to the pollution of the river. By the 1960s, the Merrimack River into which the Concord River empties, was considered one of the top 10 most polluted waterways in America.

Following the passage of the Clean Water Act in 1972, the United States initiated efforts to enhance the quality of America's water bodies. This legislation imposed more stringent regulations on point source discharges into rivers and other navigable waters. As a result, three wastewater treatment plants were constructed along the banks of the Concord River: one in Concord and two in Billerica. These facilities played a crucial role in preventing further degradation of the river ecosystem by operating within federally mandated limits.

Pollutants such as heavy metals and PCBs continue to be trapped in the sediment of the Sudbury River and downstream into the Concord River. As a result, fish consumption is prohibited in such areas, due to the presence of mercury-laden sediment originating from the Nyanza Superfund site and other sources.

In August 2004, perchlorate was detected in the Concord River. Initially, it was believed that explosives used in nearby road and building construction may have caused this contamination. However, an investigation by the town of Billerica eventually determined that the source was a local company that produced surgical and medical materials. The company had been using 220 gallons of perchloric acid per month in a bleaching process, with the rinse water being discharged into the sewage system. Following this investigation, the company voluntarily ceased operations until it could install ion exchange equipment to comply with environmental regulations.

In May 2007, Billerica faced legal action and was fined $250,000 for releasing pollutants into the Concord River. This action was taken by the U.S. Environmental Protection Agency (EPA) and the Massachusetts Department of Environmental Protection (MassDEP) due to the town exceeding allowable effluent limits for phosphorus, fecal coliform bacteria, pH, and ammonia nitrogen. Additionally, the town was charged with failing to submit discharge monitoring reports, complying with monitoring requirements, and failing to submit infiltration and inflow reporting. The EPA stated that Billerica's phosphorus discharges resulted in an excess of nutrients released in the river, leading to harmful excessive growth of aquatic plants.

== Diadromous fish recovery effort ==
In May 2000, the U.S. Fish and Wildlife Service, the Massachusetts Riverways Program, and volunteers from the Sudbury Valley Trustees (SVT) released 7,000 adult alewives into the Concord River. They were transferred from the Nemasket River so that they could lay their eggs and spawn upstream. This imprinted the young alewives with the Concord as their new home river. The experiment did not succeed, as too few fish returned to the base of the first dam on the Concord River. A feasibility study published in 2016 is again exploring steps necessary for returning diadromous fish to the Concord River, and farther upstream, to the Sudbury and Assabet Rivers.
