= Sudbury River =

River in Massachusetts, United States

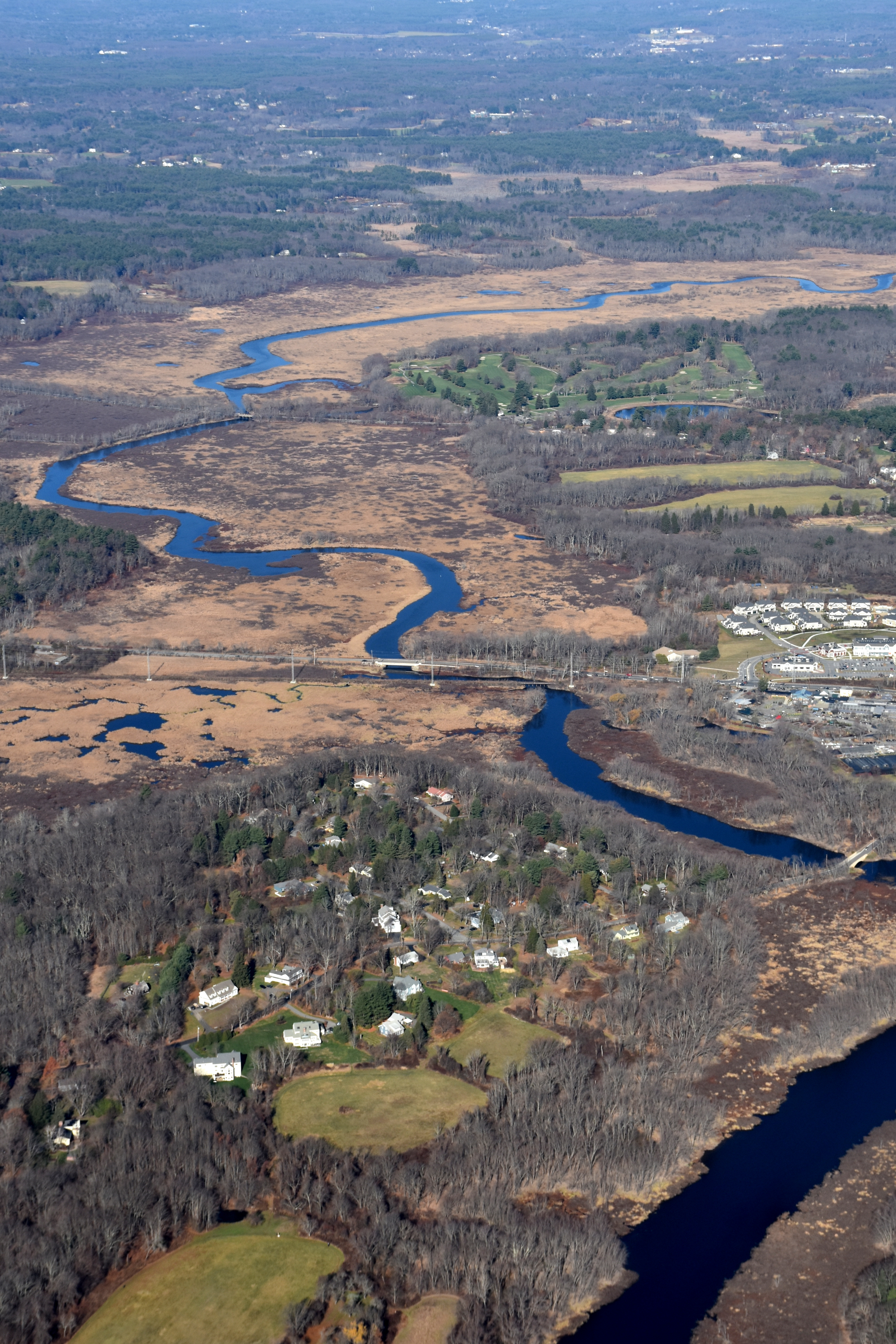
- Section of the river in Wayland, Massachusetts

Location
- Country: United States
- State: Massachusetts

National Wild and Scenic River
- Type: Scenic, Recreational
- Designated: April 9, 1999

The Sudbury River is a 32.7-mile-long (52.6 km) tributary of the Concord River in Middlesex County, Massachusetts, in the United States.

Originating in the Cedar Swamp in Westborough, Massachusetts, near the boundary with Hopkinton, the Sudbury River meanders generally northeast, through Fairhaven Bay, and to its confluence with the Assabet River at Egg Rock in Concord, Massachusetts, to form the Concord River. It has a 162-square-mile (420 km^{2}) drainage area. A 1775 map identifies the river by this name as passing through the town of Sudbury, itself established 1639.

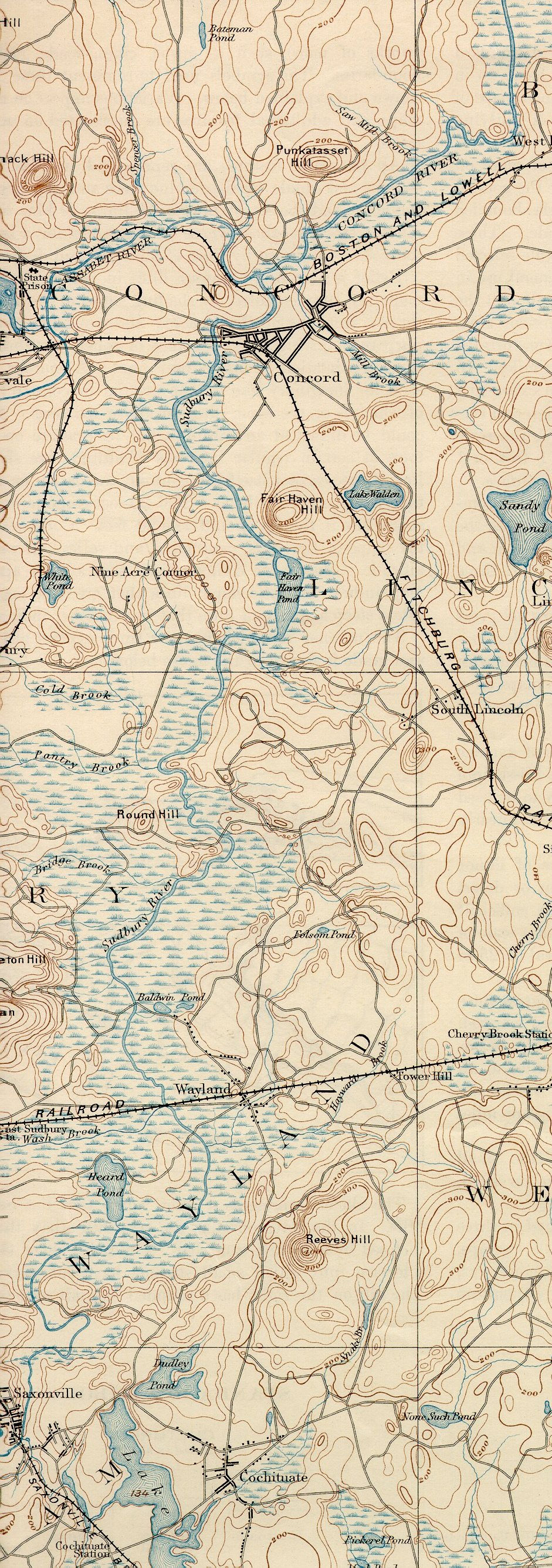
Sudbury River, lower section, from the 1894 USGS Framingham, Mass. quadrangle)

On April 9, 1999, nearly 17 miles (27 km) of the river were "recognized for their outstanding ecology, history, scenery, recreation values, and place in American literature," by being designated as a part of the National Wild and Scenic Rivers System. The 14.9-mile (24.0 km) segment of the Sudbury River beginning at the Danforth Street Bridge in the city of Framingham, downstream to the Route 2 bridge in Concord, is designated as a Scenic River, and the 1.7-mile (2.7 km) segment from the Route 2 bridge downstream to its confluence with the Assabet River at Egg Rock is designated as a Recreational River, along with adjoining stretches of the Assabet and Concord rivers.

Mercury contamination was discovered in the 1970s from the Nyanza plant in Ashland. The EPA subsequently listed the Nyanza waste dump a toxic site and led a cleanup effort to repair the damage. It is still recommended that fish caught downriver not be eaten.

== Name ==
An 1834 book on the history of Concord, Lemuel Shattuck, stated that in Concord the river upstream of the Assabet River was considered a continuation of the Concord River, but also some instances the south branch of the Concord and the Assabet the north branch. In Sudbury town records the river was referred to as the Great River early on, later the Sudbury River. West of Framingham the Sudbury was called the Hopkinton River (it borders Hopkinton, west of Ashland). Not until 1856 maps was it the Sudbury River from Westborough to Concord.

== Geography ==
The Sudbury River starts at Cedar Swamp Pond in a swampy area in Westborough and flows northeast 32.7 miles (52.6 km), starting at an elevation of 327 feet (100 m) and descending through the towns of Westborough, Hopkinton, Southborough, Ashland, Framingham, Wayland, Sudbury, Lincoln and finally Concord, where it merges (42.4653°N 71.3584°W) with the Assabet River at Egg Rock to form the beginning of the Concord River, at an elevation of 100 ft (30 m). As of 2017 there are five historic dams on the Sudbury River: two Framingham Reservoir dams, Fenwick Street Dam and Saxonville Dam in Framingham, and Myrtle Street Dam, in Ashland. The river is crossed by 34 road bridges, five railroad bridges and two footbridges. Its watershed covers 162 square miles (420 km^{2}).

Starting in November 1979 the U.S. Geological Survey installed and maintains a gauge for river depth and flow rate on the Sudbury River, downstream of the Danforth Street Bridge, Saxonville, Framingham. The upstream watershed is 106 square miles (270 km^{2}), 65% of the total Sudbury River watershed. The average flow rate for 37 years of complete data (1981–2016) is 201 cubic feet per second (cfs). Flow rate changes with seasons – summer months average 80 cfs while spring months average 375cfs. Highest recorded flow was 2,570 cfs on March 31, 2010. Water depth at the gauge on that date was 13.95 feet. Any time depth exceeds 13.0 feet the river is considered to be in major flood status. Last major flood before 2010 was April 8, 1987, 13.47 feet.

== Invasive Species ==
Water caltrop, more commonly known as water chestnut, species Trapas natans, is an invasive waterplant from western Asia. The initial introductions in the U.S. were in the 1870s in Cambridge, MA, followed by deliberate introduction into ponds near the Concord and Sudbury Rivers. This is now an invasive, habitat-destroying plant across many of the eastern states. On the Sudbury River, OARS (Organization for the Assabet, Sudbury and Concord Rivers) organizes annual plant pulling events. Volunteers in canoes hand-pull the surface-floating rosettes of leaves and nuts before the nuts mature and fall to the bottom. The infestation on the Sudbury River is particularly bad between the Fenwick Street and Saxonville dams, where the water surface can be more than 80% covered.

== Recreational Boating ==
OARS - the Organization for the Assabet, Sudbury and Concord Rivers has detailed on-line and downloadable maps for six sections of the Sudbury River, including locations and descriptions of put-ins for canoes or kayaks. For those interested in renting, the South Bridge Boat House, on Route 62 west of the center of Concord offers "Rent a canoe or kayak and explore miles of peaceful waterways on the Assabet, Sudbury and Concord Rivers."

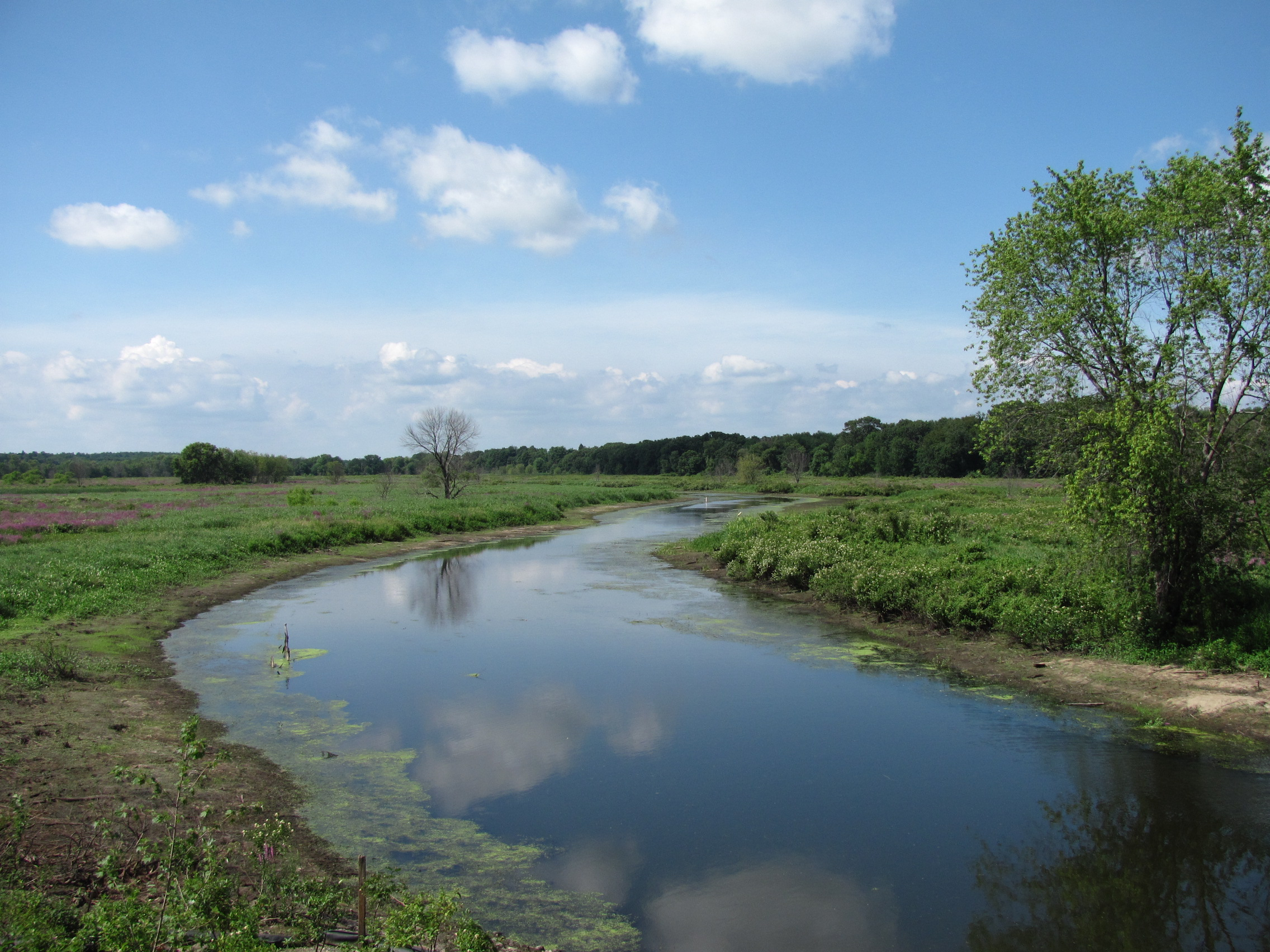
Sudbury River in Wayland

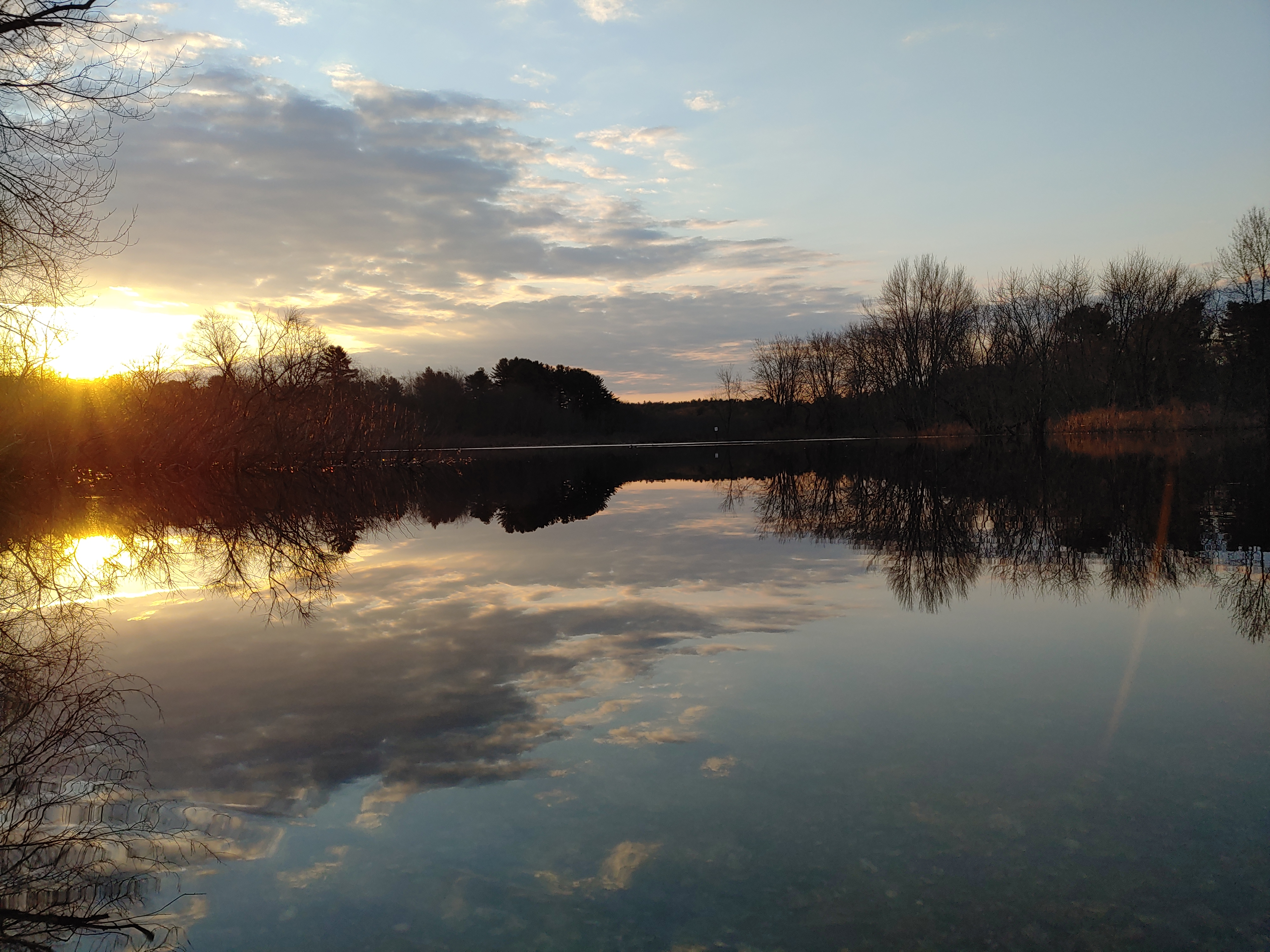
Sherman's Bridge Landing, Wayland

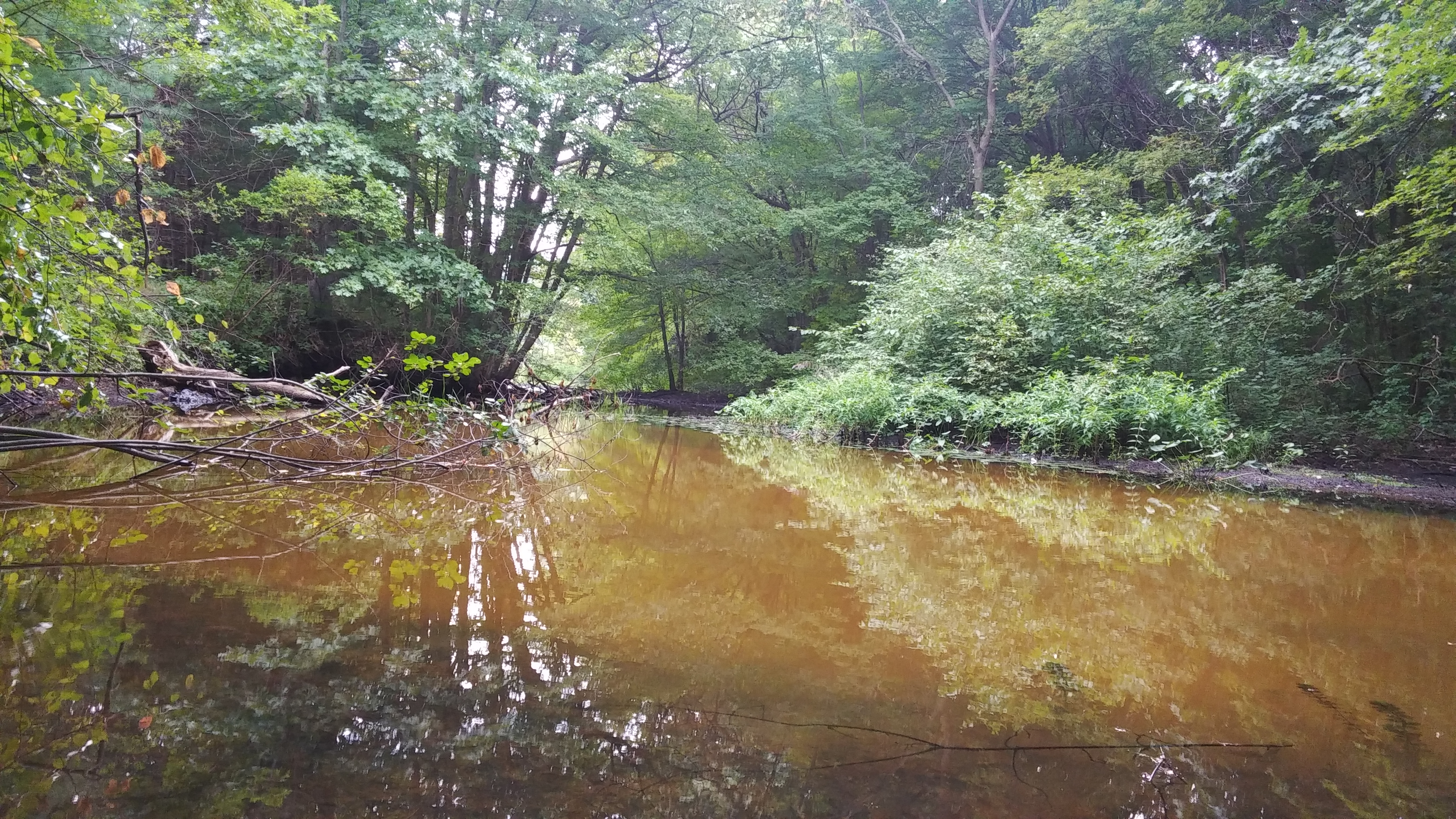
Downstream from the little falls, Simpson Park, Framingham
