= A Week on the Concord and Merrimack Rivers =

1849 book by Henry David Thoreau

- Author: Henry David Thoreau
- Language: English
- Publication date: 1849

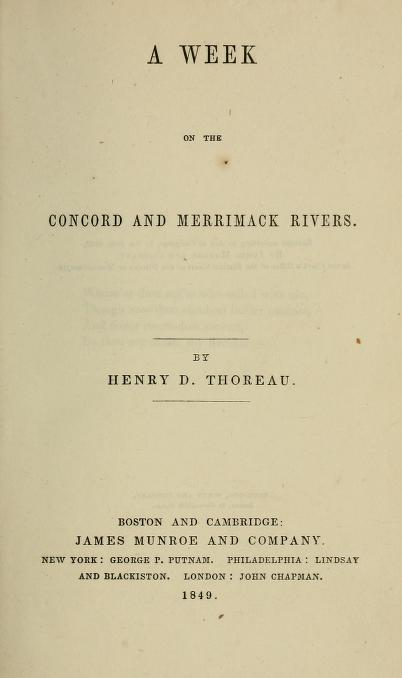
A Week on the Concord and Merrimack Rivers title page, 1849

A Week on the Concord and Merrimack Rivers (1849) is a book by American writer Henry David Thoreau (1817–1862). It recounts his experience on a boat trip with his brother on the Concord River and Merrimack River.

== Overview ==
A Week on the Concord and Merrimack Rivers is ostensibly the narrative of a boat trip from Concord, Massachusetts to Concord, New Hampshire, and back, that Thoreau took with his brother John in 1839. John died of tetanus in 1842 and Thoreau wrote the book, in part, as a tribute to his memory. While the book may appear to be a travel journal, broken up into chapters for each day, this is deceptive. The actual trip took two weeks and while given passages are a literal description of the journey — down the Concord River to the Middlesex Canal, to the Merrimack River, and back — much of the text is in the form of digressions by the Harvard-educated author on diverse topics such as religion, poetry, and history. Thoreau relates these topics to his own life experiences, often in the context of the rapid changes taking place in his native New England during the Industrial Revolution, changes that Thoreau often laments.

== Composition and publication history ==
On July 4, 1845, Henry David Thoreau moved to a small home he assembled at Walden Pond and lived there for two years, two months, and two days. During his time there, he completed the first draft of A Week on the Concord and Merrimack Rivers. He was unable to find a publisher, however, and therefore had it printed at his own expense. Published in 1849, it was Thoreau's first book and it cost him several hundred dollars, though only 219 copies sold. By 1853, the printer refused to store the unsold copies and returned 706 of them to Thoreau, who noted at the time, "I have now a library of nearly nine hundred volumes, over seven hundred of which I wrote myself".

In 1842, Thoreau sold the Musketaquid, the boat he used for his journey, to Nathaniel Hawthorne for $7 and a rowing lesson. Hawthorne, then living at The Old Manse, renamed the boat Pond Lily but was disappointed he was not able to operate the boat as easily as Thoreau, for whom it seemed "as docile as a trained steed".

A Week on the Concord and Merrimack Rivers was one of several nonfiction works inspired by nature and travel written by New England transcendalists, including Ralph Waldo Emerson's Nature (1836) and Margaret Fuller's Summer on the Lakes (1844).

A slightly revised version of A Week on the Concord and Merrimack Rivers, based on corrections Thoreau had made himself, was published in 1868, six years after his death.

== Reception and influence ==
It received only two contemporary reviews. The Athenæum described it as one of the "worst offshoots of Carlyle and Emerson." The Westminster Review also took issue with its style, though in all felt that "the book is an agreeable book." Thoreau had sent a copy to James Anthony Froude, who wrote back, "In your book . . . I see hope for the coming world."

An 1853 short story by Herman Melville, "Cock-A-Doodle-Doo!", is interpreted as a satire of Thoreau's book.

The French composer Robert Piéchaud (born 1969) wrote The River (2016), a wind quintet which freely follows Thoreau's work. An additional voice part is found in the last movement, setting All Things Are Current Found, the last poem of the book.

John McPhee recreated Thoreau's journey in a canoe starting August 31, 2003, and wrote about it in "Paddling After Henry David Thoreau".
