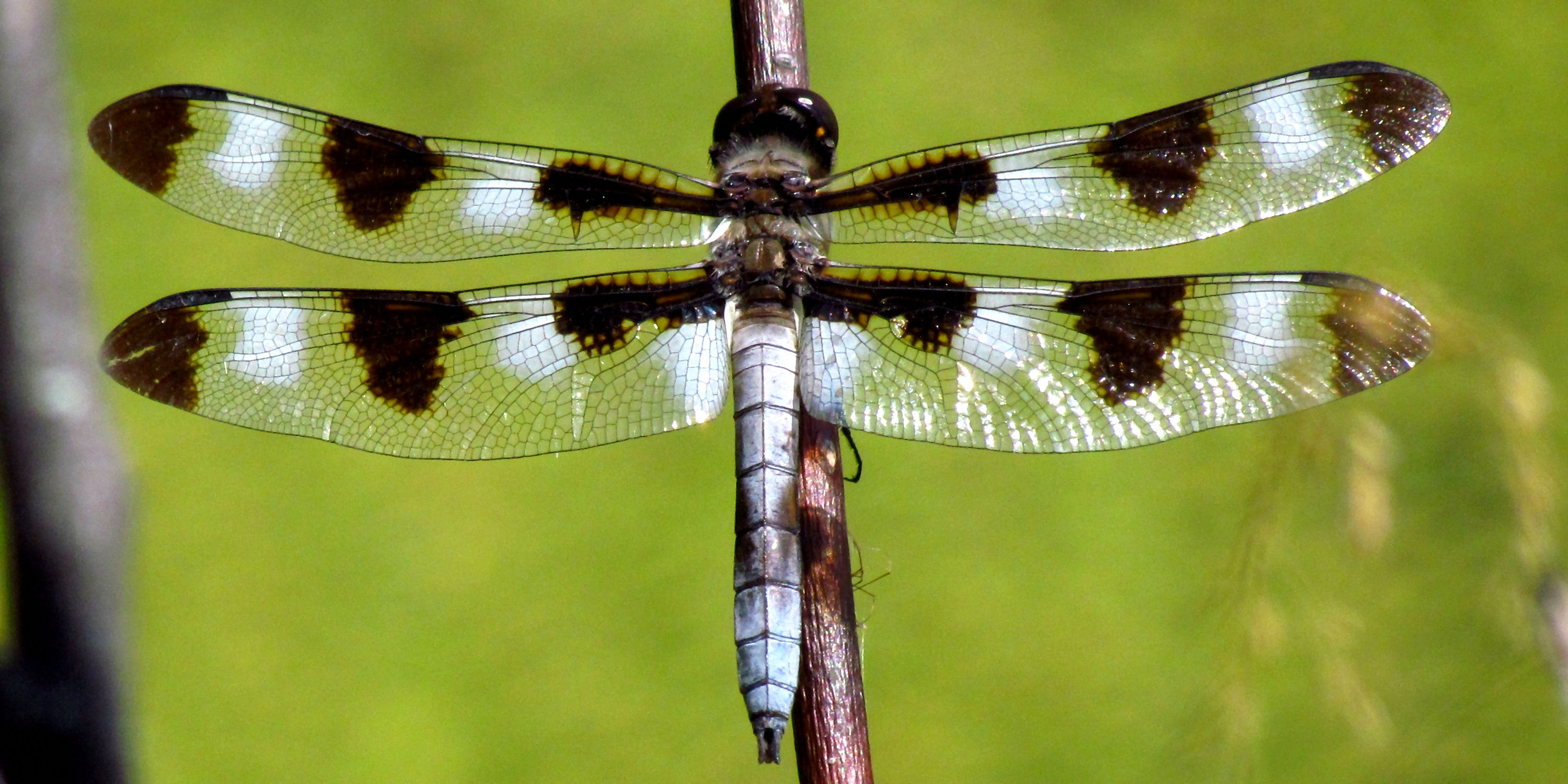
- Male
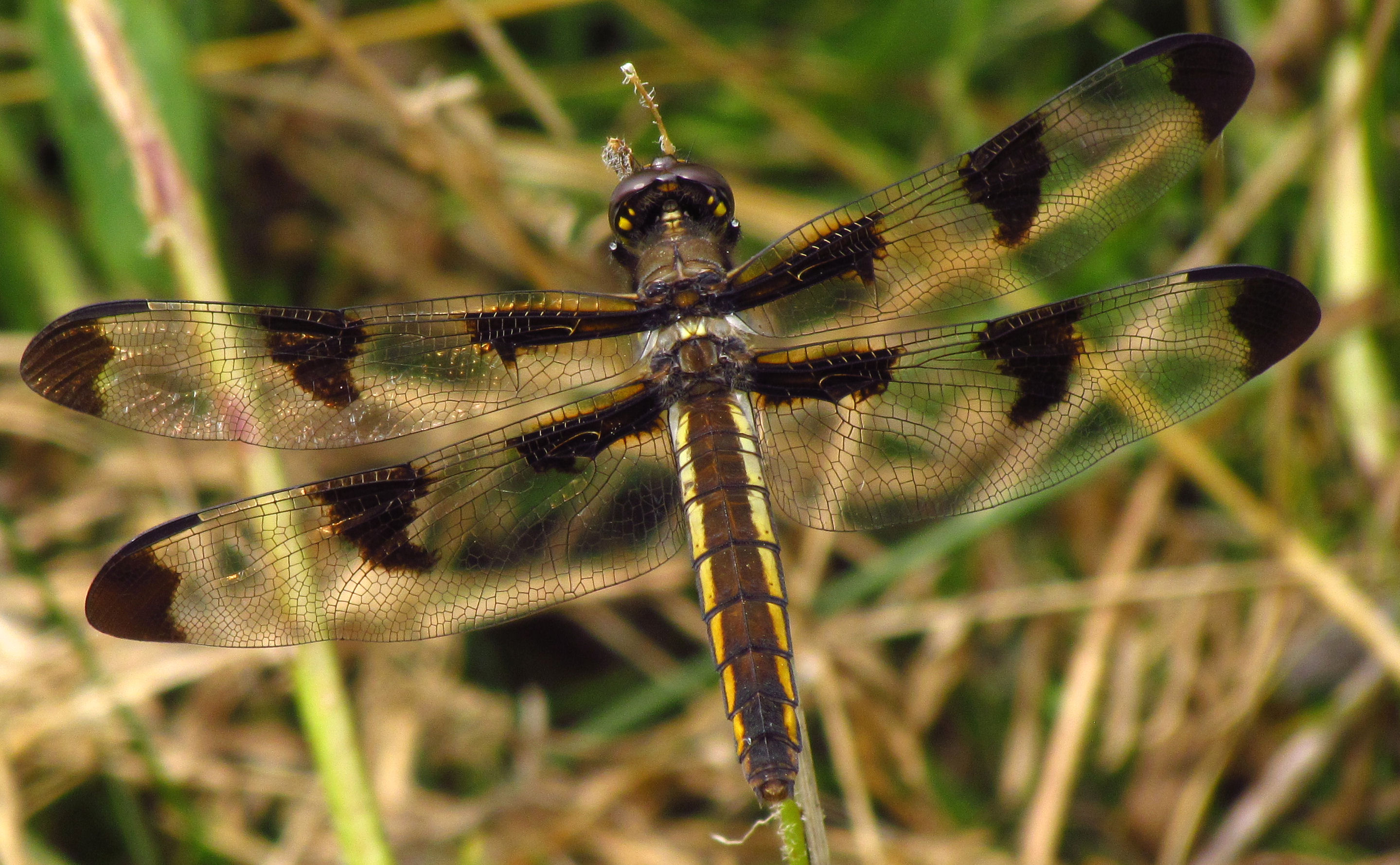
- Female

Scientific classification
- Kingdom: Animalia
- Phylum: Arthropoda
- Clade: Pancrustacea
- Class: Insecta
- Order: Odonata
- Infraorder: Anisoptera
- Family: Libellulidae
- Genus: Libellula
- Species: L. pulchella

Binomial name
- Libellula pulchella (Drury, 1773)

= Twelve-spotted skimmer =

Species of dragonfly

The twelve-spotted skimmer (Libellula pulchella) is a common North American skimmer dragonfly, found in southern Canada and in all 48 of the contiguous U.S. states.

It is a large species, at 50 mm (2.0 in) long. Each wing has three brown spots. In adult males, additional white spots form between the brown ones and at the bases of the hindwings; it is sometimes called the ten-spot skimmer for the number of these white spots.
