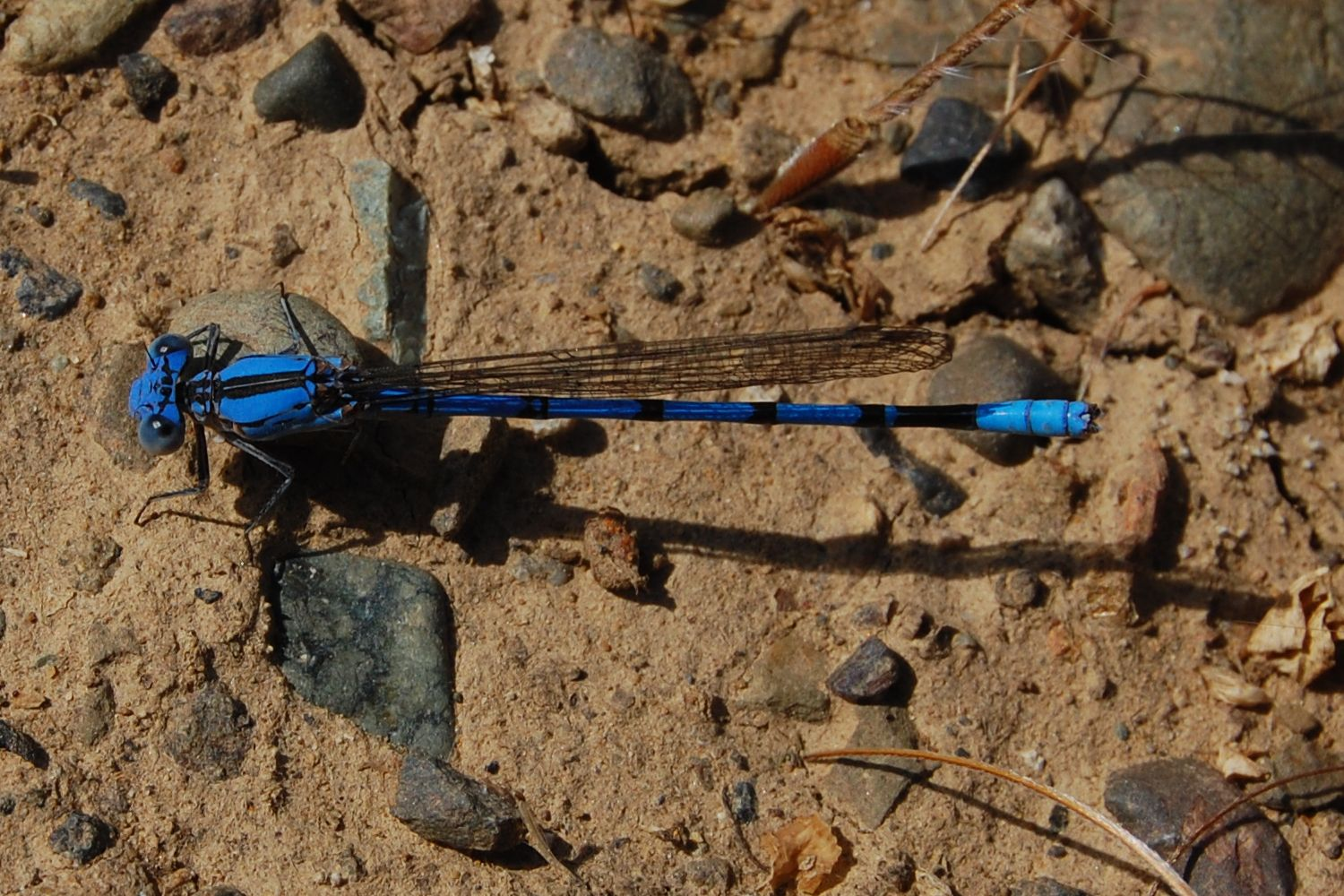

Scientific classification
- Domain: Eukaryota
- Kingdom: Animalia
- Phylum: Arthropoda
- Class: Insecta
- Order: Odonata
- Suborder: Zygoptera
- Family: Coenagrionidae
- Genus: Argia
- Species: A. agrioides

Binomial name
- Argia agrioides Calvert, 1895

= California dancer =

Species of damselfly

The California dancer (Argia agrioides) is a damselfly of the family Coenagrionidae, native from Oregon south through California to Arizona, as well as adjacent parts of Mexico.
