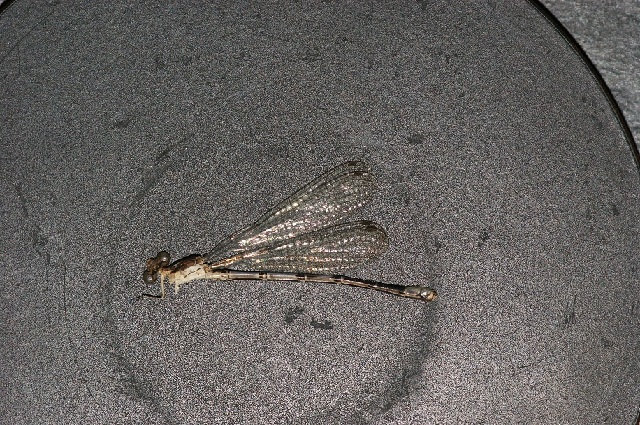

Scientific classification
- Domain: Eukaryota
- Kingdom: Animalia
- Phylum: Arthropoda
- Class: Insecta
- Order: Odonata
- Suborder: Zygoptera
- Family: Coenagrionidae
- Genus: Argia
- Species: A. hinei

Binomial name
- Argia hinei Kennedy, 1918

= Lavender dancer =

Species of damselfly

The lavender dancer (Argia hinei) is a damselfly of the family Coenagrionidae, native to the western United States from west Texas to southern California, as well as adjacent regions of northern Mexico.
