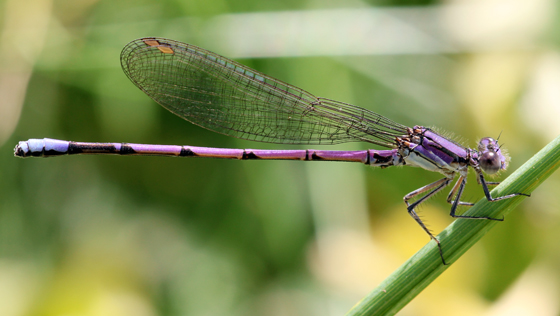
- Violet dancer A. f. violacea, Male

Conservation status
- Secure (NatureServe)

Scientific classification
- Kingdom: Animalia
- Phylum: Arthropoda
- Class: Insecta
- Order: Odonata
- Suborder: Zygoptera
- Family: Coenagrionidae
- Genus: Argia
- Species: A. fumipennis

Binomial name
- Argia fumipennis (Burmeister, 1839)

Subspecies
- A. f. atra; A. f. fumipennis; A. f. violacea

= Variable dancer =

Species of insect

The variable dancer (Argia fumipennis) is a damselfly of the family Coenagrionidae. It is native to North America, where it is widespread throughout the east and present in the interior western United States.

The male of the subspecies A. f. violacea (the violet dancer) is purple with a blue tip.

== Subspecies ==
Argia fumipennis has three subspecies:

- Black dancer A. f. atra
- Smoky-winged dancer A. f. fumipennis
- Violet dancer A. f. violacea
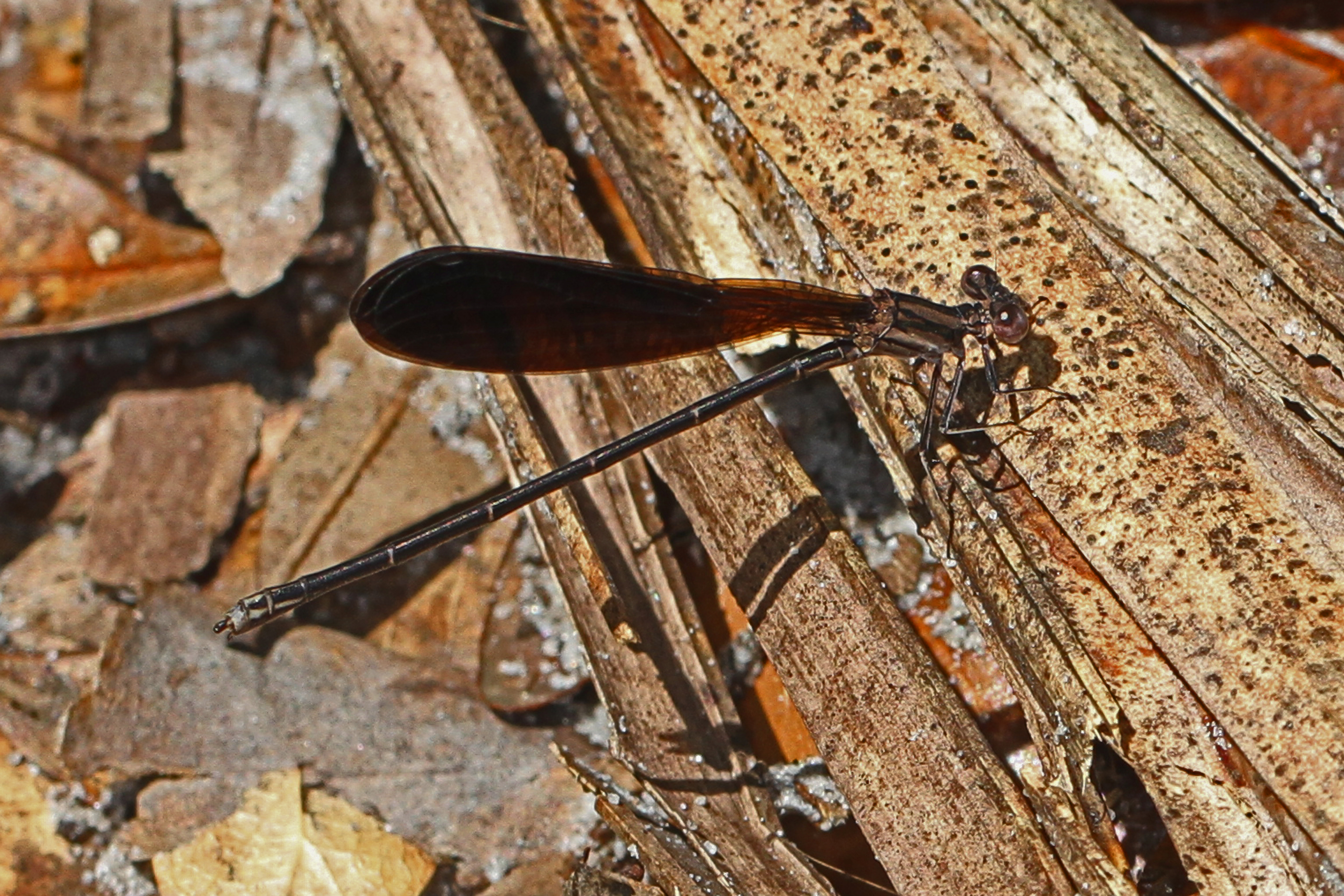
Black dancer A. f. atra

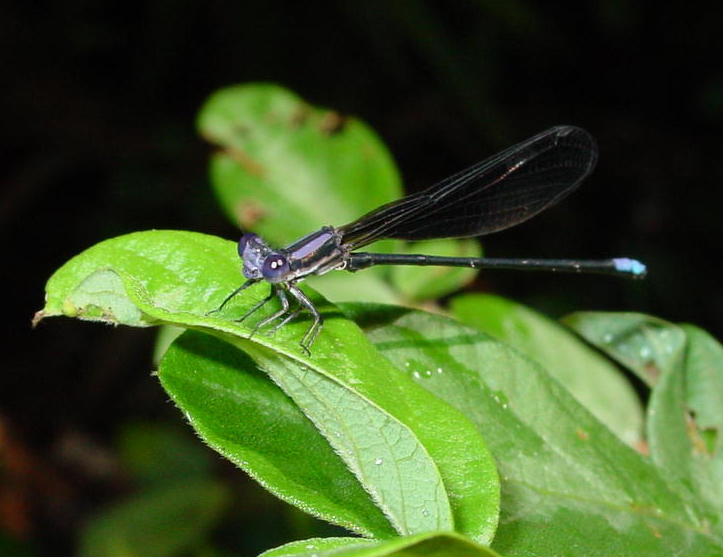
Smoky-winged dancer A. f. fumipennis, Male

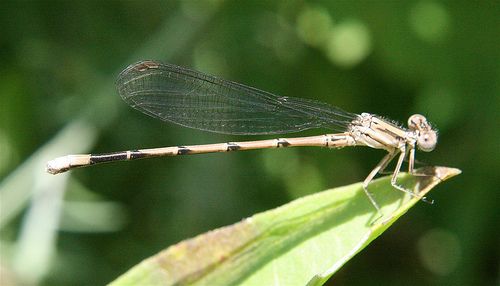
Violet dancer A. f. violacea, Female

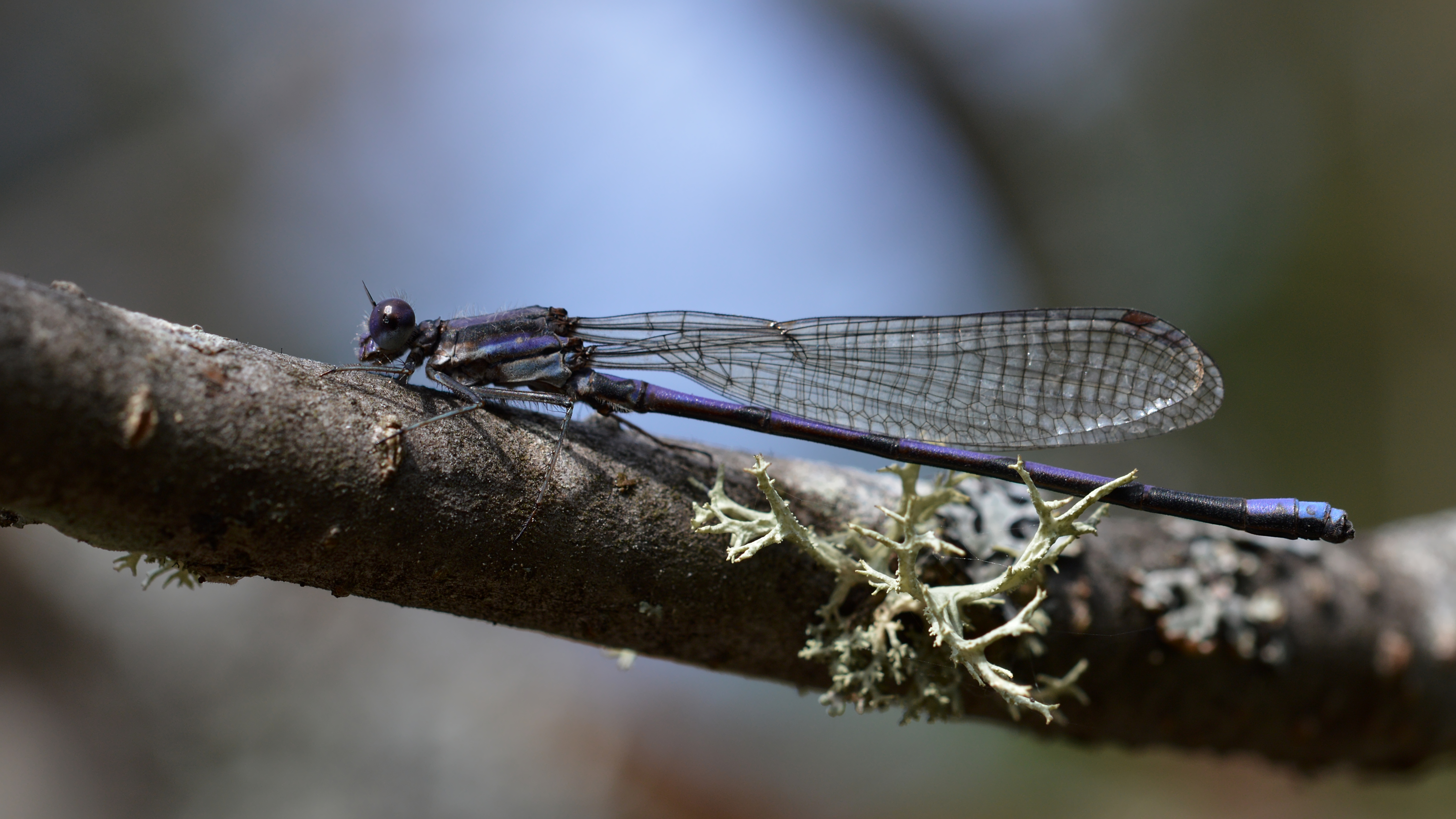
Violet dancer A. f. violacea, Male
